= List of tallest buildings in St. Louis =

Skyline of St. Louis
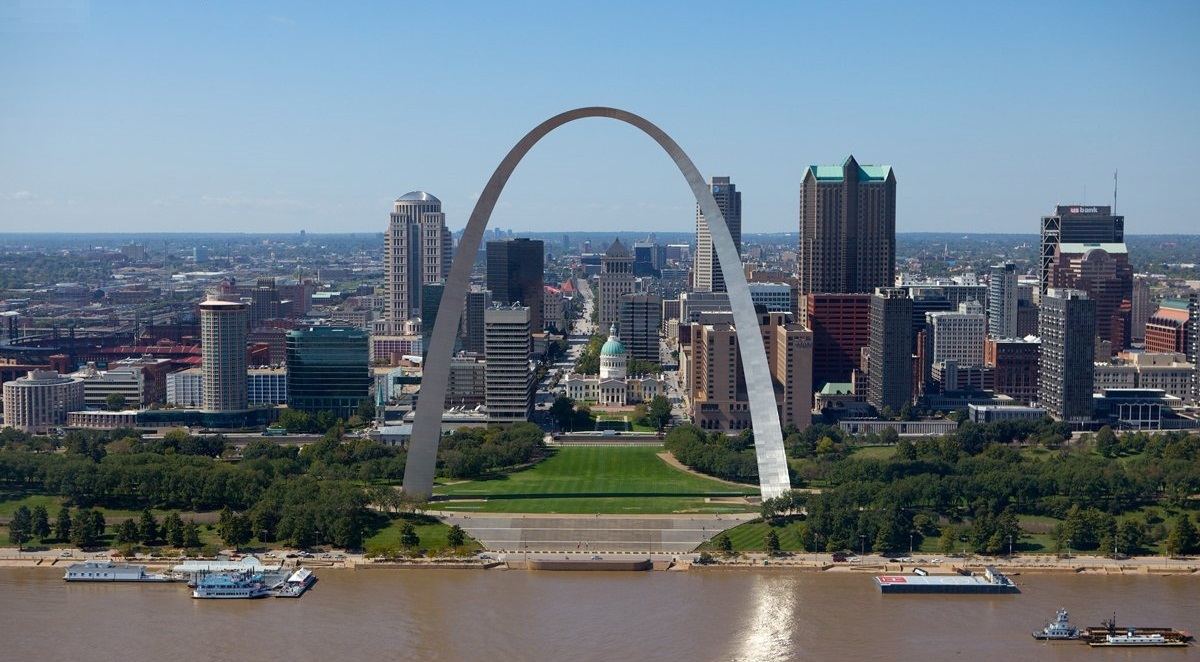
- Downtown St. Louis and the Gateway Arch in 2013
- Tallest building: One Metropolitan Square (1988)
- Tallest building height: 593 ft (180.8 m)
- Tallest structure: Gateway Arch (1965)
- Tallest structure height: 630 ft (192 m)
- Major clusters: Downtown St. Louis; Central West End
- First 150 m+ building: 909 Chestnut Street (1986)

Number of tall buildings (2026)
- Taller than 100 m (328 ft): 12
- Taller than 150 m (492 ft): 3

Number of tall buildings — feet
- Taller than 200 ft (61.0 m): 60
- Taller than 300 ft (91.4 m): 14

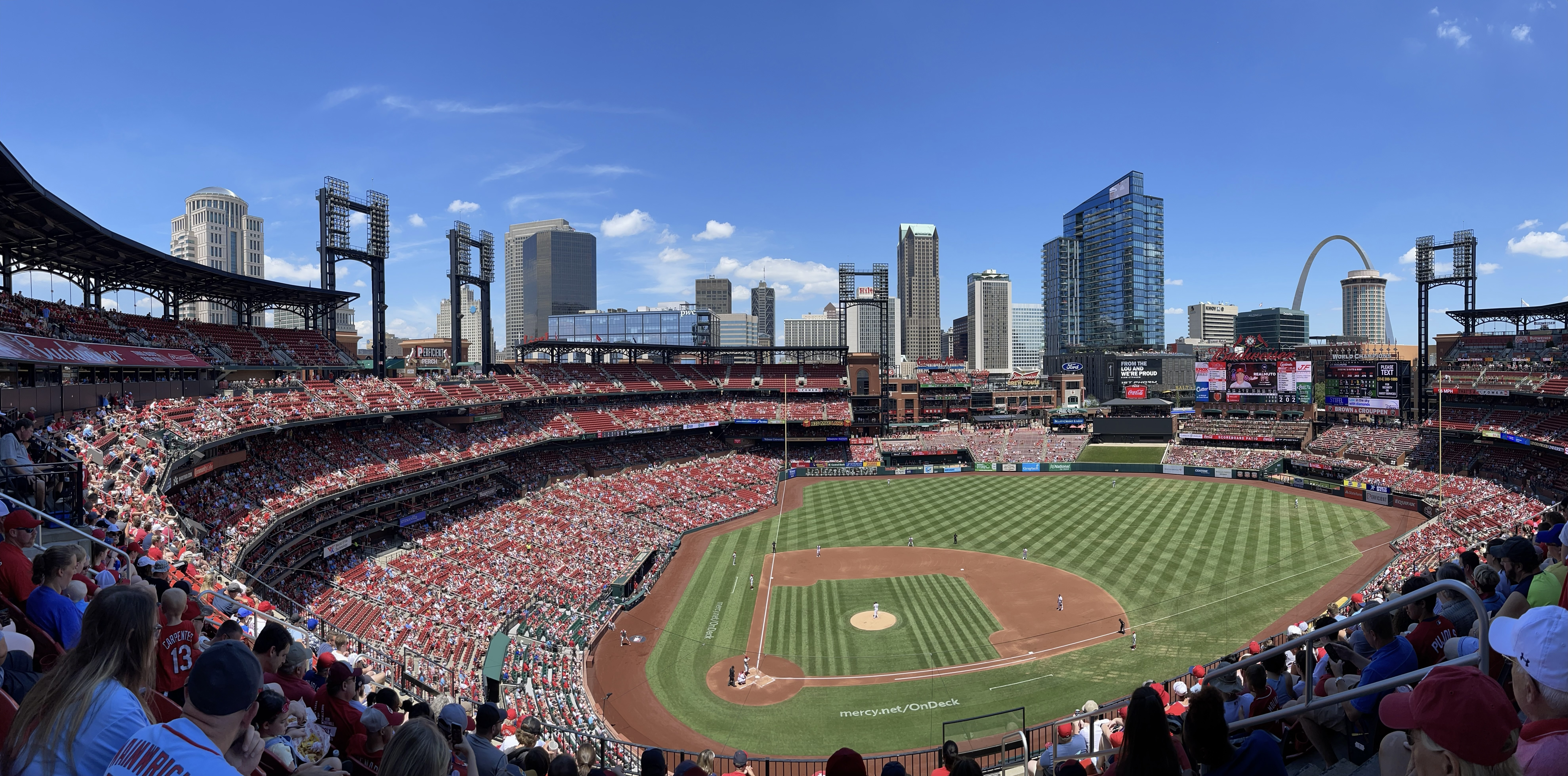
Panorama of St. Louis' skyline from Busch Stadium in 2022

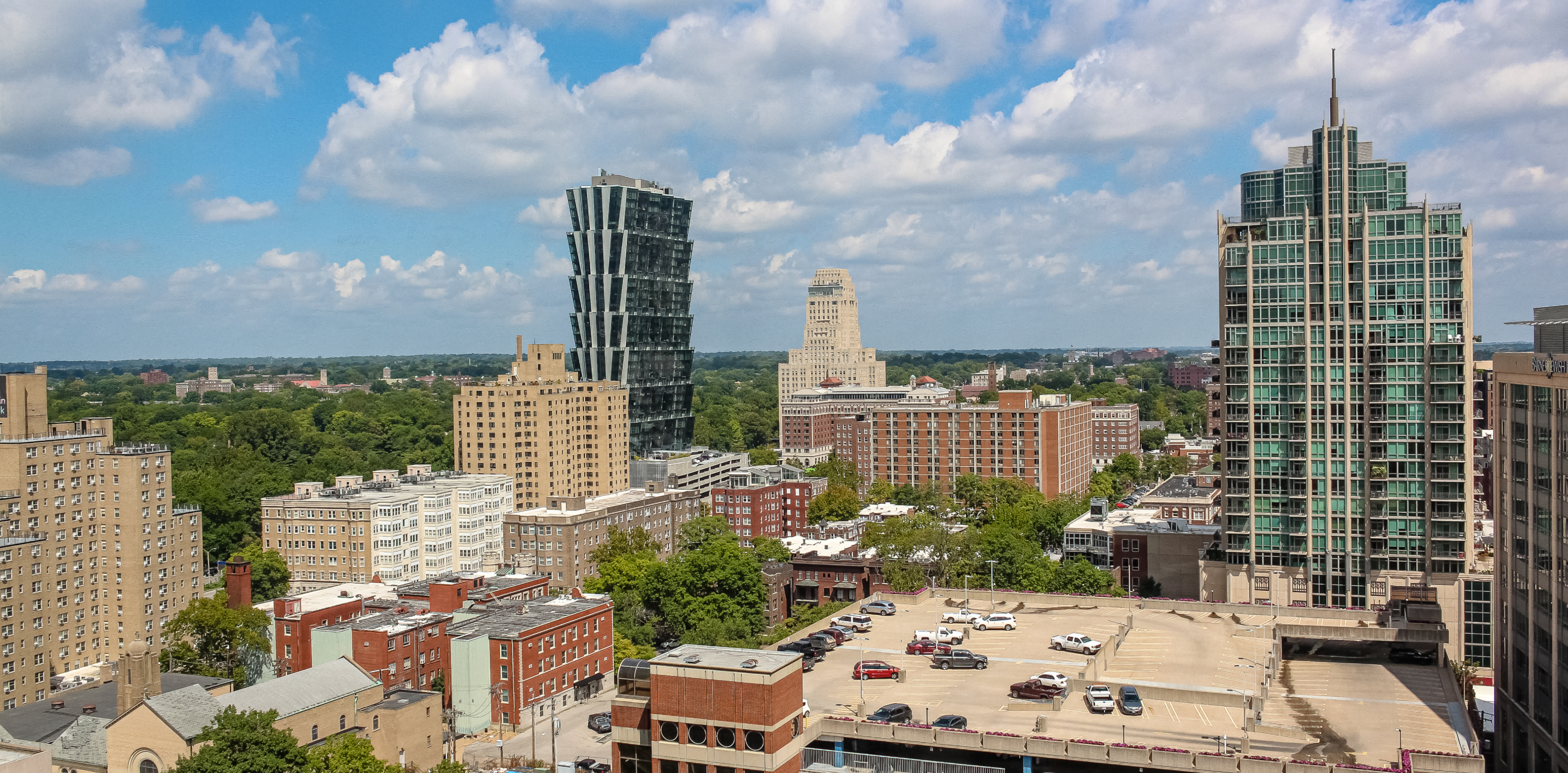
Skyline of the Central West End

St. Louis, an independent city in the U.S. state of Missouri, anchors the largest metropolitan area in the state, with 2.8 million residents. The city is home to 60 buildings with a height greater than 200 feet (61 m) as of 2026. 14 of these buildings are taller than 300 ft (91 m), the second most in Missouri after Kansas City, which has 18. St. Louis' skyline is famous for the Gateway Arch, a 630 ft (192 m) tall monument commemorating the westward expansion of the United States. The world's tallest arch, it was completed in 1965 and opened in 1967. The tallest habitable building in St. Louis is One Metropolitan Square, an office skyscraper rising to a height of 593 ft (181 m) and built in 1988. Close behind is 909 Chestnut Street, which is only 5 feet shorter at 588 ft (179 m) and was completed in 1986.

One of the largest cities in the United States at the turn of the 20th century, St. Louis has an early history of high-rise development. The ten-story Wainwright Building, designed by architect Louis Sullivan and built in 1891, is considered to be one of the earliest examples of an aesthetically fully expressed skyscraper. The Greek Revival-style Old Courthouse, site of the Dred Scott case, remained the tallest building in St. Louis until the early 20th century. Historic buildings realized in the 1910s and 1920s include the Railway Exchange Building, Marriott St. Louis Grand Hotel, and the Southwestern Bell Building, which at 399 ft (122 m) was the tallest building in St. Louis from 1926 to 1969 as the Great Depression brought about a freeze in skyscraper construction in the 1930s.

Despite undergoing population decline, St. Louis entered another major period of development from the 1960s to 1980s. In addition to the addition of St. Louis' two tallest buildings, the 1980s also saw the construction of One City Center, then the largest urban shopping mall in the United States. While skyscraper development slowed down in the 1990s, an even taller court building, the Thomas F. Eagleton United States Courthouse, was built in 2000. It is the second tallest judicial building in the world, and the largest in the country. The downtown skyline has changed relatively little in the 21st century, with the tallest addition being One Cardinal Way, a 334 ft (102 m) tower completed in 2020 as part of the expansion of Ballpark Village. The residential towers of Park East Tower and One Hundred Above the Park have redefined the skyline of Central West End.

St. Louis' tallest buildings are located in Downtown St. Louis, which is immediately west of the Mississippi River. Central West End, west of downtown, has the next largest collection of high-rises in the city. Besides its residential towers, the Washington University Medical Campus has several multi-story buildings for hospitals and related healthcare facilities. The campus has expanded significantly in the 21st century. Midtown St. Louis has a smaller number of high-rises, the tallest being the 286 ft (87 m) Continental Life Building. The city of Clayton, directly west of St. Louis, boasts the second largest skyline in Greater St. Louis as a major business district.

== History ==
Number of high-rise buildings by height in St. Louis by the end of each year, based on the list below. This takes into account four demolished buildings that were once taller than 200 ft (61 m). Click on the legend to toggle a specific height on or off. View chart definition.

In the 1850s, the city’s tallest building was the six-story Barnum's City Hotel, designed by architect George I. Barnett. From 1864 until 1894, it was the Old Courthouse, which stands 192 feet (59 m) tall.

The city gained one of the world’s first modern skyscrapers with the 1890-91 construction of the 10-story Wainwright Building. Designed by Louis Sullivan and Dankmar Adler using the principle of "form follows function", the office building had a steel frame and elevators, two innovations that helped produce the skyscraper era.

Into the 1900s, St. Louis saw construction move westward, especially that of office buildings. In 1914, the Railway Exchange Building was completed, which was the city's tallest building for many years. The city underwent a moderate building boom in the 1920s, which led to the planning of the Jefferson National Expansion Memorial in 1935.

Seven of the top 30 tallest skyscrapers have been built in the 21st century; the most recent is One Cardinal Way, a 29-story, 334-foot (102 m) tower completed in 2020 as part of the expansion of Ballpark Village.

== Map of tallest buildings ==
=== Downtown St. Louis ===
Downtown St. Louis has most of the city's tall buildings, which are separated from the Mississippi River by the Gateway Arch and the surrounding Gateway Arch National Park. The maps below show buildings taller than 200 ft (61 m) in downtown, numbered by their rank among the city’s tall buildings and colored by the decade of its completion.

Buildings taller than 200 ft (61 m) in Downtown St. Louis.
- 1950s and before
- 1960s
- 1970s
- 1980s
- 1990s
- 2000s
- 2010s
- 2020s
1 One Metropolitan Square
2 909 Chestnut Street
3 Thomas F. Eagleton United States Courthouse
4 One US Bank Plaza
5 Laclede Gas Building
6 Southwestern Bell Building
7 Civil Courts Building
8 Bank of America Plaza
10 600 Washington
11 One Cardinal Way
14 Tower at OPOP
15 1010 Market Street
16 Millennium Hotel St. Louis
17 Four Seasons Hotel St. Louis
18 City Place St. Louis
19 Mansion House Apartments
20 Gentry's Landing
22 500 Broadway Building
23 Hilton at the Ballpark East Tower
26 Railway Exchange Building
27 Broadway Tower
28 Equitable Building
29 Marriott St. Louis Grand Hotel
30 Robert A. Young Federal Building
31 Courtyard St. Louis Downtown/Convention Center
32 Park Pacific
33 KMOV Gateway Tower
35 Saint Louis Place
39 Millennium Center
47 Wright Building
48 Marquette Building
50 210.com Building
51 Paul Brown Building
52 Pointe 400
54 Arcade Building
55 Southwestern Bell Data Center
56 The Syndicate
57 Ralston Purina Headquarters
58 Chemical Building
59 Hyatt Regency St. Louis Riverfront

=== Central West End ===
For 80 years, the tallest building in the Central West End neighborhood directly east of Forest Park was the 1931 Park Plaza hotel. It was dethroned in 2020 by One Hundred Above the Park, a residential high-rise designed by Studio Gang. Central West End is also home to the Washington University Medical Campus, which has several medical and educational buildings that stand taller than 200 ft (61 m).

Buildings taller than 200 ft (61 m) in Central West End.
- 1950s and before
- 1960s
- 1970s
- 1980s
- 1990s
- 2000s
- 2010s
- 2020s
9 One Hundred Above the Park
12 Park East Tower
13 Park Plaza
25 Barnes-Jewish Hospital Plaza West Tower
34 Barnes-Jewish Hospital Plaza Tower
36 Executive House Apartments
40 St. Louis Children Hospital Expansion
41 Center for Advanced Medicine
42 The View at Forest Park Apartments
44 St. Louis Children's Hospital
45 Doctor's Office Building
46 Barnes-Jewish Hospital Parkview Tower
49 BJC Institute of Health at Washington University
53 Barnes-Jewish Center for Outpatient Health

== Cityscape ==
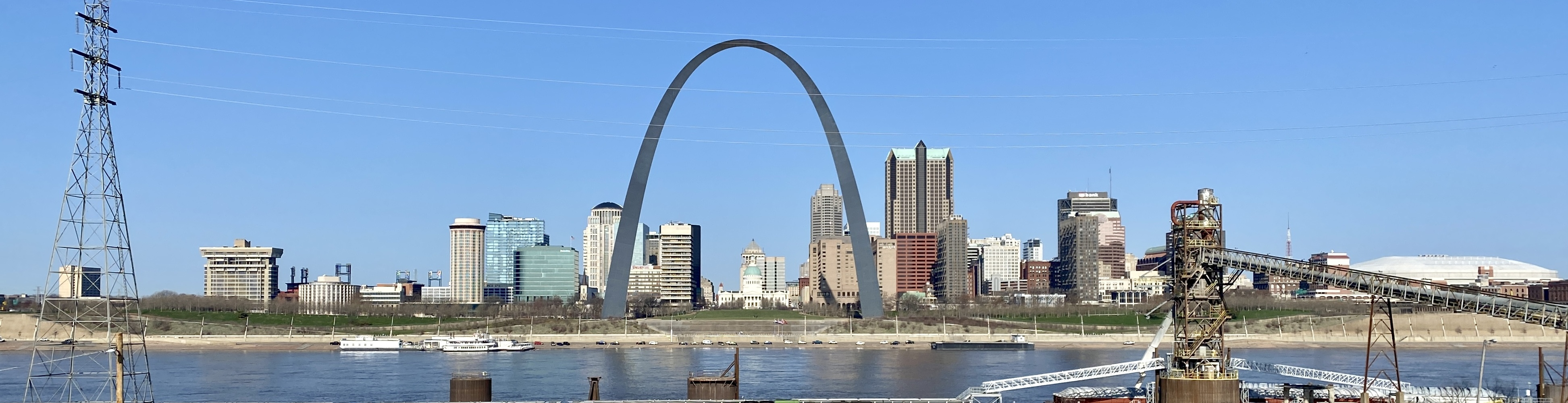
St. Louis skyline on the Mississippi River in 2023.

== Tallest buildings ==
This list ranks completed buildings in St. Louis that stand at least 200 ft (61 m) tall as of 2026, based on standard height measurement. This includes spires and architectural details but does not include antenna masts. The “Year” column indicates the year of completion. Buildings tied in height are sorted by year of completion with earlier buildings ranked first, and then alphabetically. Free-standing structures taller than 200 ft (61 m) are also included for comparison purposes.

Was the tallest building in St. Louis upon completion

Rank	Name	Image	Location	Height ft (m)	Floors	Year	Purpose	Notes
N/A	Gateway Arch		100 Washington Avenue 38°37′29″N 90°11′06″W	630 (192)	–	1965	Monument	Inaugurated in 1967, Gateway Arch is one of St. Louis' most iconic landmarks, commemorating the westward expansion of the United States. Tallest arch in the world. Tallest monument and memorial in the United States. Not an inhabitable building; included for comparison purposes.
1	One Metropolitan Square		211 North Broadway 38°37′39″N 90°11′23″W	593 (180.8)	42	1988	Office	Tallest building in St. Louis and second tallest in Missouri. Tallest building in St. Louis completed in the 1980s. Designed by Hellmuth, Obata & Kassabaum.
2	909 Chestnut Street		909 Chestnut Street 38°37′40″N 90°11′40″W	588 (179.2)	44	1986	Office	Tallest building in St. Louis from 1986 to 1988, until the completion of One Metropolitan Square. Largest office building in Missouri. Formerly One SBC and AT&T Center. Designed by Hellmuth, Obata & Kassabaum.
3	Thomas F. Eagleton United States Courthouse		111 South 10th Street 38°37′32″N 90°11′49″W	567 (172.8)	29	2000	Government	Second tallest judicial building in the world. Tallest building completed in St. Louis in the 2000s. Designed by Hellmuth, Obata & Kassabaum.
4	One US Bank Plaza		505 North 7th Street 38°37′48″N 90°11′27″W	484 (147.6)	35	1976	Office	Tallest building in St. Louis from 1976 to 1986, until the completion of 909 Chestnut Street. Pinnacle height of 592 ft (180 m). Designed by Tvsdesign
5	Laclede Gas Building		720 Olive Street 38°37′42″N 90°11′32″W	401 (122.2)	31	1969	Office	Tallest building in St. Louis from 1969 to 1976, until the completion of One US Bank Plaza. Designed by Emery Roth & Sons.
N/A	Stan Musial Veterans Memorial Bridge		Mississippi River 38°38′45″N 90°10′42″W	400 (122)	–	2014	Transport	Height of the bridge's pylons. Not an inhabitable building; included for comparison purposes.
6	Southwestern Bell Building		1010 Pine Street 38°37′41″N 90°11′44″W	399 (121.7)	26	1926	Office	Tallest building in St. Louis for over 30 years from 1926 to 1969, until the completion of the Laclede Gas Building. First building in St. Louis to use setbacks, has 17 individual roofs. Tallest building in St. Louis until the construction of the Laclede Gas Building. Pinnacle height of 460 ft (140 m). Designed by Mauran, Russell, & Crowell.
7	Civil Courts Building		10 North Tucker Boulevard 38°37′39″N 90°11′50″W	384 (117.1)	13	1981	Government	Landmark court building used by the 22nd Judicial Circuit Court of Missouri in St. Louis.
8	Bank of America Plaza		800 Market Street 38°37′33″N 90°11′38″W	384 (117.1)	31	1981	Office	Designed by Hellmuth, Obata & Kassabaum.
9	One Hundred Above the Park		100 North Kingshighway 38°38′34″N 90°15′53″W	381 (116.1)	36	2020	Residential	Tallest building in Central West End and in St. Louis outside of downtown. Designed by Studio Gang.
10	600 Washington		600 Washington Avenue 38°37′45″N 90°11′23″W	375 (114.3)	25	1986	Office	Also known as One City Centre. Was part of the largest urban shopping mall complex in the U.S. when it opened. Designed by Hellmuth, Obata & Kassabaum. (Note: The mall itself has closed, although the building is still used for office space.)
N/A	Ameren UE Tower		1901 Chouteau Avenue 38°37′24″N 90°12′39″W	349 (106.5)	–	2009	Communication	Not an inhabitable building; included for comparison purposes.
11	One Cardinal Way		1 Cardinal Way 38°37′26″N 90°11′28″W	334 (101.8)	29	2020	Residential	First residential tower built within the Ballpark Village development.
12	Park East Tower		2555 Grand Avenue 38°38′26″N 90°15′46″W	330 (100.7)	26	2007	Residential	Designed by Zimmer Gunsul Frasca Partnership.
13	Park Plaza		212 North Kingshighway 38°38′41″N 90°15′51″W	313 (95.5)	27	1931	Mixed-use	Tallest building completed in St. Louis during the 1930s. Mixed-use residential and hotel building. Designed by Preston J. Bradshaw.
14	Tower at OPOP		411 North 8th Street 38°37′47″N 90°11′32″W	312 (95.1)	25	2010	Residential	Formerly the Roberts Tower.
N/A	St. Francis de Sales Oratory		2563 Ohio Avenue 38°36′15″N 90°13′35″W	301 (91.7)	3	1895	Religious	Tallest church in St. Louis.
15	1010 Market Street		1010 Market Street 38°37′35″N 90°11′49″W	296 (90.3)	20	1982	Office	
16	Millennium Hotel St. Louis		200 South 4th Street 38°37′23″N 90°11′20″W	289 (88.1)	28	1968	Hotel	Formerly Stouffer's Riverfront Towers and the Regal Riverfront Hotel. Closed since 2014. Demolition of the hotel began in 2025.
17	Four Seasons Hotel St. Louis		999 North 2nd Street 38°38′02″N 90°11′05″W	289 (88)	20	2007	Hotel	Tallest primarily hotel building in St. Louis. Designed by Hellmuth, Obata & Kassabaum.
18	City Place St. Louis		200 North 4th Street 38°37′37″N 90°11′15″W	287 (87.5)	28	1965	Hotel	Formerly the Radisson Hotel & Suites St. Louis and Holiday Inn Downtown Riverfront.
19	Mansion House Apartments		300 North 4th Street 38°37′40″N 90°11′13″W	287 (87.5)	28	1965	Residential	
20	Gentry's Landing		400 North 4th Street 38°37′44″N 90°11′12″W	287 (87.5)	28	1965	Residential	
21	Continental Life Building		3615 Olive Street 38°38′19″N 90°13′58″W	286 (87.1)	22	1930	Residential	Tallest building in Midtown St. Louis. Designed by William B. Ittner. Converted from office to residential use in 2001.
22	500 Broadway Building	–	500 North Broadway 38°37′47″N 90°11′16″W	281 (85.8)	22	1970	Office	
23	Hilton at the Ballpark East Tower		1 South Broadway 38°37′30″N 90°11′27″W	280 (85.4)	27	1976	Hotel	
24	Council House East		310 South Grand Boulevard 38°37′55″N 90°13′53″W	280 (85.3)	26	1969	Residential	
25	Barnes-Jewish Hospital Plaza West Tower	–	1 Barnes-Jewish Hospital Plaza 38°38′08″N 90°15′57″W	279 (85.1)	16	2025	Health	Designed by CannonDesign. Replaced the demolished Queeny Tower.
26	Railway Exchange Building		615 Olive Street 38°37′43″N 90°11′26″W	277 (84.4)	21	1914	Office	Tallest building in St. Louis from 1914 to 1926. Tallest building in St. Louis completed during the 1910s. Largest office building in the world upon opening. Designed by Mauran, Russell, & Crowell.
27	Broadway Tower	–	100 North Broadway 38°37′36″N 90°11′20″W	275 (83.8)	22	1976	Office	Formerly known as Bank of America Tower. Designed by Hellmuth, Obata & Kassabaum.
28	Equitable Building		10 South Broadway 38°37′29″N 90°11′23″W	272 (82.9)	22	1971	Office	Designed by Hellmuth, Obata & Kassabaum.
29	Marriott St. Louis Grand Hotel		800 Washington Avenue 38°37′50″N 90°11′32″W	270 (82.3)	18	1917	Hotel	Built as the Hotel Statler.
30	Robert A. Young Federal Building		1222 Spruce Street 38°37′27″N 90°12′02″W	269 (81.9)	20	1933	Office	
31	Courtyard St. Louis Downtown/Convention Center		823 Washington Avenue 38°37′52″N 90°11′33″W	268 (81.6)	25	1925	Hotel	Designed by Preston J. Bradshaw. Built as the Lennox Hotel. Formerly the Renaissance St. Louis Suites Hotel.
32	Park Pacific		1226 Olive Street 38°37′46″N 90°11′56″W	265 (80.7)	23	1928	Residential	Formerly office space for the Missouri Pacific and then Union Pacific railroads, hence also known as the Missouri Pacific Building. Was to be 35 stories but ended at 23 due to the Great Depression. Designed by Mauran, Russell, & Crowell.
33	KMOV Gateway Tower		1 Memorial Drive 38°37′29″N 90°11′17″W	261 (79.6)	21	1967	Office	Designed by Hellmuth, Obata & Kassabaum.
34	Barnes-Jewish Hospital Plaza Tower		1 Barnes-Jewish Hospital Plaza 38°38′07″N 90°15′53″W	255 (77.7)	18	1971	Health	Largest hospital in Missouri. Originally 12 stories and 177 feet (54 m) tall, later additions brought it to its current height.
35	Saint Louis Place	–	200 North Broadway 38°37′38″N 90°11′20″W	253 (77.1)	20	1983	Office	
36	Executive House Apartments	–	4466 West Pine Boulevard 38°38′26″N 90°15′26″W	252 (77) (Note: Sources do not state the exact height of this building. This figure was determined using Google Earth by subtracting the altitude of the building's lowest main pedestrian open-air entrance from its highest architectural point.)	24	1965	Residential	
37	Desloge Towers		1465 South Grand Boulevard 38°37′22″N 90°14′18″W	250 (76.2)	15	1933	Health	
38	A.G. Edwards Headquarters	–	1 North Jefferson Avenue 38°37′57″N 90°12′59″W	250 (76)	18	1988	Office	Former headquarters of A.G. Edwards before its acquisition by Wells Fargo in 2007.
39	Millennium Center	–	515 Olive Street 38°37′41″N 90°11′23″W	249 (76)	20	1963	Office	
40	St. Louis Children Hospital Expansion	–	One Children's Place 38°38′17″N 90°15′56″W	242 (74)	12	2018	Health	
41	Center for Advanced Medicine	–	4921 Parkview Place 38°38′18″N 90°15′47″W	239 (73)	15	2001	Health	
42	The View at Forest Park Apartments	–	4400 Lindell Boulevard 38°38′29″N 90°15′18″W	238 (73)	23	1960	Residential	Also known as The Towne House.
43	Dorchester Apartments	–	665 South Skinker Boulevard 38°38′16″N 90°18′14″W	236 (72)	25	1962	Residential	Tallest building in Wydown/Skinker.
44	St. Louis Children's Hospital		One Children's Place 38°38′17″N 90°15′53″W	234 (71)	12	1982	Health	
45	Doctor's Office Building	–	4990 Children's Place 38°38′13″N 90°15′55″W	231 (70)	15	2006	Office	
46	Barnes-Jewish Hospital Parkview Tower	–	216 South Kingshighway Boulevard 38°38′21″N 90°15′54″W	231 (70)	12	2018	Health	
N/A	St. Louis Union Station		1820 Market Street 38°37′45″N 90°12′25″W	231 (70)	–	1894	Transport	Height of the clock tower Tallest structure in St. Louis from 1894 to 1914.
47	Wright Building		801-815 Pine Street 38°37′41″N 90°11′34″W	230 (70.1)	18	1907	Office	
48	Marquette Building		300 North Broadway 38°37′41″N 90°11′19″W	228 (69.5)	19	1914	Office	
49	BJC Institute of Health at Washington University		425 S Euclid Avenue 38°38′12″N 90°15′49″W	225 (69)	11	2009	Education	A $150 million six-floor expansion was announced in 2021 and was completed in 2024, bringing the building to its current height. It was already taller than 200 ft (61 m) when it was completed in 2009.
50	210.com Building	–	210 North Tucker Boulevard 38°37′45″N 90°11′50″W	223 (68)	18	1969	Office	
51	Paul Brown Building		206 North 9th Street 38°37′42″N 90°11′37″W	217 (66)	16	1928	Residential	
52	Pointe 400		400 South 4th Street 38°37′17″N 90°11′23″W	216 (65.8)	15	1969	Office	Also known as PET Plaza or Pet Milk Building.
53	Barnes-Jewish Center for Outpatient Health		4901 Forest Park Avenue 38°38′23″N 90°15′45″W	215 (66)	12	2011	Health	
54	Arcade Building		812 Olive Street 38°37′43″N 90°11′34″W	214 (65.2)	16	1918	Office	
55	Southwestern Bell Data Center	–	801 Chestnut Street 38°37′39″N 90°11′36″W	213 (65)	12	1990	Data center	
56	The Syndicate		915 Olive Street 38°37′46″N 90°11′39″W	211 (64.3)	17	1907	Office	
57	Ralston Purina Headquarters	–	1 Checkerboard Square 38°37′08″N 90°11′55″W	210 (64)	15	1969	Office	Headquarters of Ralston Purina.
N/A	St. Louis Lambert International Airport Control Tower		10701 Lambert International Boulevard 38°44′36″N 90°21′58″W	210 (64)	18	1991	Transport	
58	Chemical Building		777 Olive Street 38°37′43″N 90°11′32″W	209 (63.7)	17	1903	Mixed-use	Mixed-use residential and hotel building.
59	Hyatt Regency St. Louis Riverfront		315 Chestnut Street 38°37′34″N 90°11′17″W	204 (62.2)	17	1907	Hotel	Once an Adam's Mark hotel.
60	801 South Skinker	–	801 South Skinker Boulevard 38°38′10″N 90°18′15″W	200 (61)	17	1961	Residential	
N/A	St. Louis Wheel		201 South 18th Street 38°37′40″N 90°12′34″W	200 (61)	–	2019	Ride	

== Tallest buildings in Greater St. Louis ==
Outside of the city of St. Louis, the largest concentration of high-rises in the St. Louis metropolitan area is found in Clayton, which is immediately west of St. Louis. Clayton has over ten buildings taller than 200 ft (61 m), and has seen more high-rise construction in the 21st century relative to St. Louis.

== Tallest under construction or proposed ==
=== Under construction ===
The following table includes buildings under construction in St. Louis that are planned to be at least 200 ft (61 m) tall as of 2026, based on standard height measurement. The “Year” column indicates the expected year of completion. Buildings that are on hold are not included.

Name	Neighborhood	Height ft (m)	Floors	Year	Purpose	Notes
Albion West End	Central West End	325 (99)	30	2027	Residential	305 unit apartment building at 4974 Lindell Blvd. Site work began in July 2025.
Cardinal Glennon Children's Hospital	The Tiffany	280 (85)	14	2027	Health	14-story, 505,092 square foot hospital tower with 200 inpatient beds. 280' to helipad, 314' to mechanical roof.

=== Proposed ===
The following table includes approved and proposed buildings in St. Louis that are expected to be at least 200 ft (61 m) tall as of 2026, based on standard height measurement. The “Year” column indicates the expected year of completion. A dash “–“ indicates information about the building’s height, floor count, or year of completion is unknown or has not been released.

Name	Neighborhood	Height ft (m)	Floors	Year	Purpose	Status	Notes
The 314	Downtown West	317 (97)	29	–	Residential	Approved	287 unit mass timber apartment building at 21st and Locust Streets.
The Riverline	Downtown	–	41	–	Residential	Proposed	Part of Cordish Companies $670 million plan to redevelop the Millennium Hotel property.

== Tallest demolished ==
This table lists buildings that once stood taller than 200 ft (61 m) in St. Louis that have been demolished.

Name	Image	Height ft (m)	Floors	Year completed	Year demolished	Purpose	Notes
Queeny Tower		258 (78.6)	19	1965	2021	Health	Part of Barnes-Jewish Hospital.
Third National Bank Building		228 (69.5)	20	1907	1977	Office	Also known as the Mississippi Valley Building. Now the site of One Metropolitan Square.
Ambassador Building	–	223 (68)	17	1928	1996	Office	
International Building	–	215 (65.5)	19	1907	1984	Office	

== Timeline of tallest buildings ==
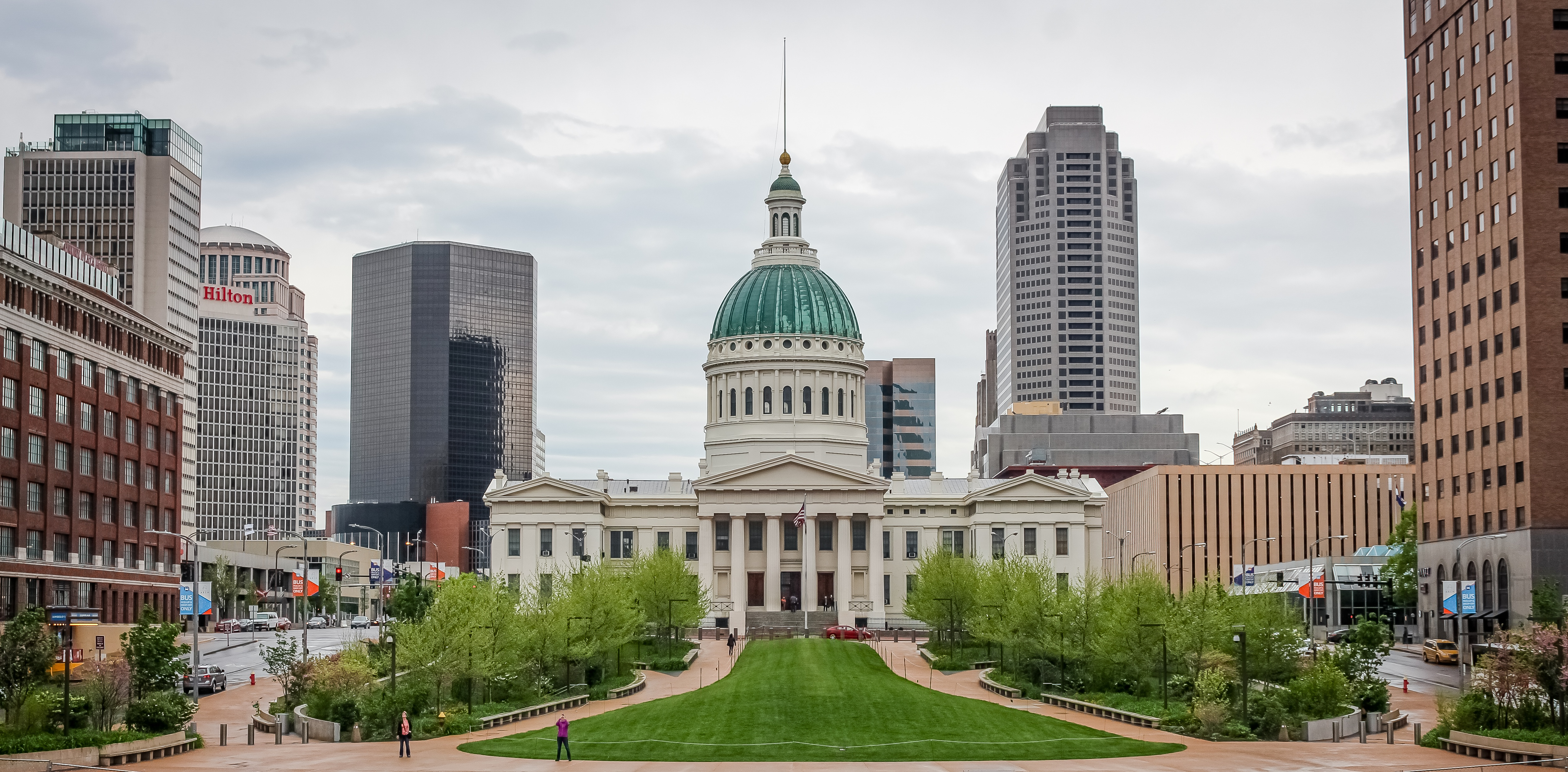
The Old Courthouse was the tallest building in St. Louis from 1864 until the early 20th century.

This table lists buildings that once held the title of tallest building in St. Louis.

Name	Image	Street address	Years as tallest	Height ft (m)	Floors	References
Railway Exchange Building		615 Olive Street	1914–1926	277 (84)	21	
Southwestern Bell Building		1010 Pine Street	1926–1969	399 (122)	28	
Laclede Gas Building		720 Olive Street	1969–1976	401 (122)	31	
One US Bank Plaza		505 North 7th Street	1976–1986	484 (148)	35	
One AT&T Center		909 Chestnut Street	1986–1989	588 (179)	44	
One Metropolitan Square		211 North Broadway	1989–present	593 (181)	42	

== See also ==
- List of tallest buildings in Missouri
- List of tallest buildings in the United States
