= One Cardinal Way =

Residential skyscraper in St. Louis

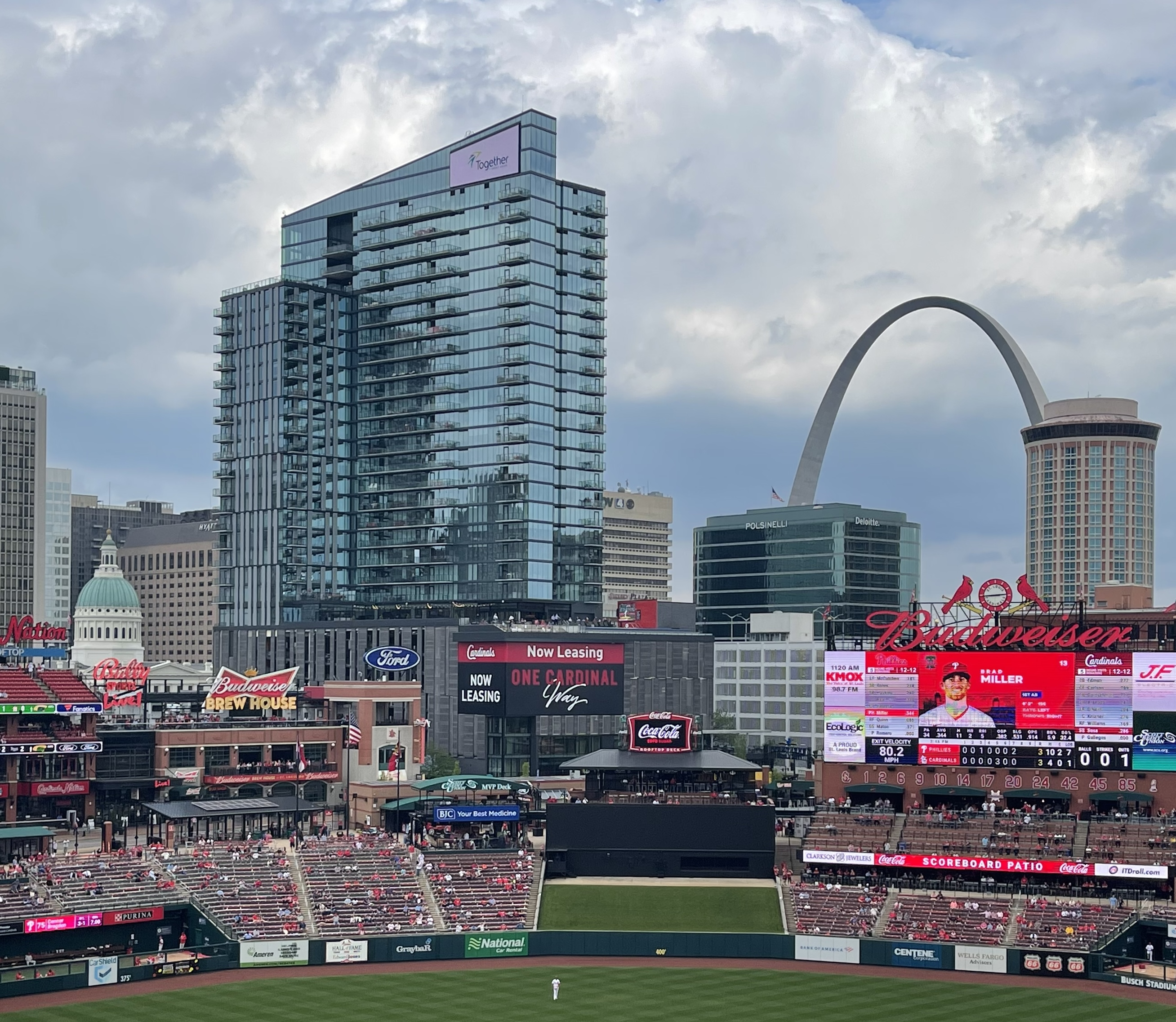
- One Cardinal Way seen from Busch Stadium with the Gateway Arch and the demolished Millennium Hotel St. Louis in the background in 2023

- Location within Missouri Location within the United States

General information
- Status: Completed
- Type: Residential
- Architectural style: Modern
- Location: 1 Cardinal Way, St. Louis, Missouri, United States
- Coordinates: 38°37′25″N 90°11′28″W
- Construction started: 2017
- Completed: 2020

Height
- Roof: 334 ft (102 m)

Technical details
- Floor count: 29

Design and construction
- Architect: Hord Coplan Macht

Website
- onecardinalway.com

One Cardinal Way is a 334 ft (102 m) tall modern residential skyscraper located on 1 Cardinal Way in Downtown St. Louis. The building has 29 floors and was built from 2017 to 2020. The building is currently the 11th-tallest building in St Louis and the 2nd-tallest building in St. Louis built in the 2020s with the tallest building built in the 2020s being One Hundred Above the Park. The building was designed by Hord Coplan Macht.

== History ==
The building is part of phase two of the Ballpark Village development. The building is the first residential tower that was built in the Ballpark Village development.

== Awards ==
In 2020 and 2021, the tower won two awards from the National Association of Home Builders. The first award was the Best in Region award for the Central United States; the second award was the Platinum award for Multi-Family Development 8 Stories & Over, For Rent.

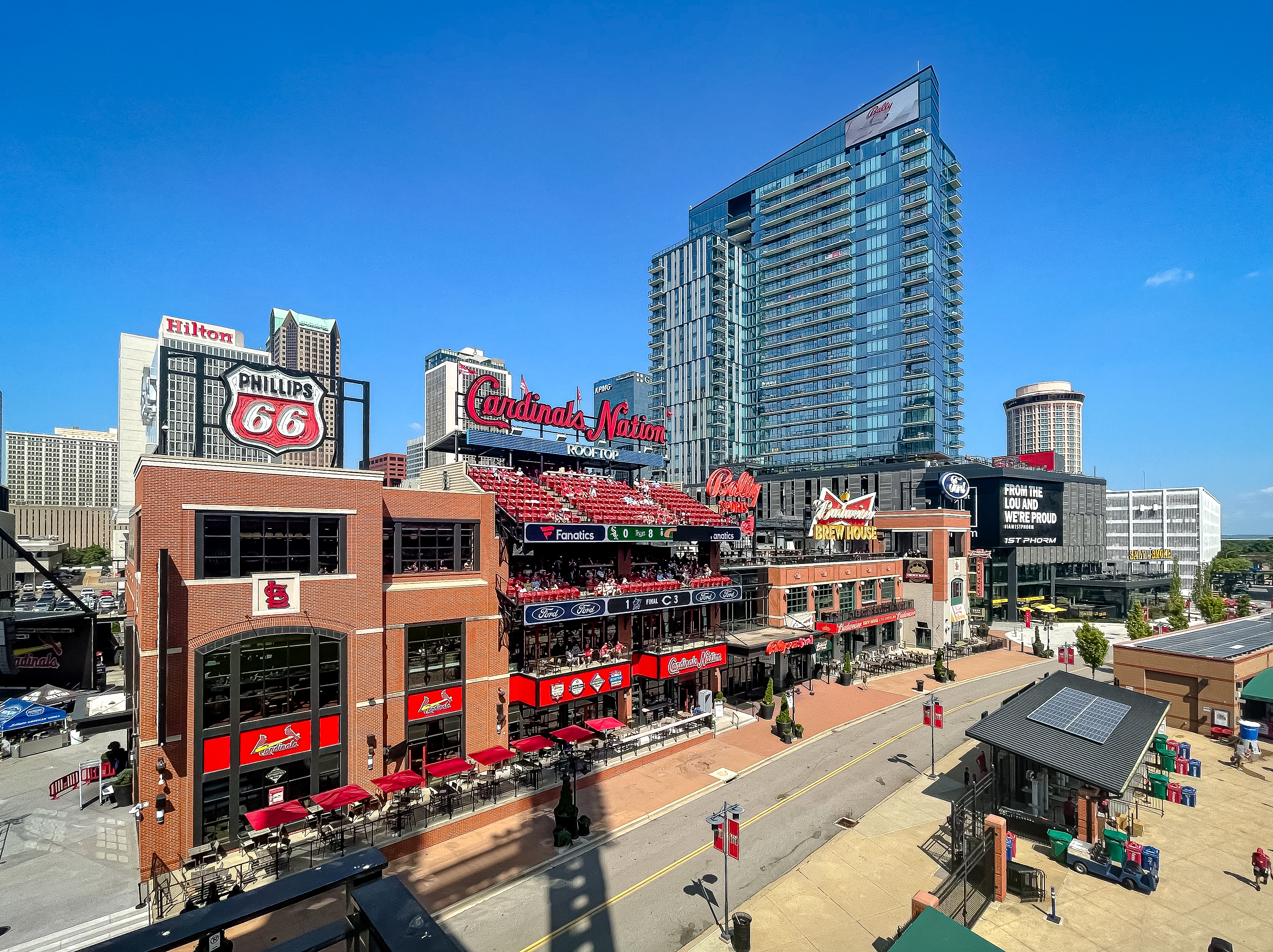
Ballpark Village Phase 1 and 2.

== See also ==
- List of tallest buildings in St. Louis
- List of tallest buildings in Missouri
- Ballpark Village (St. Louis)
