= 909 Chestnut Street =

Skyscraper in St. Louis, Missouri

909 Chestnut
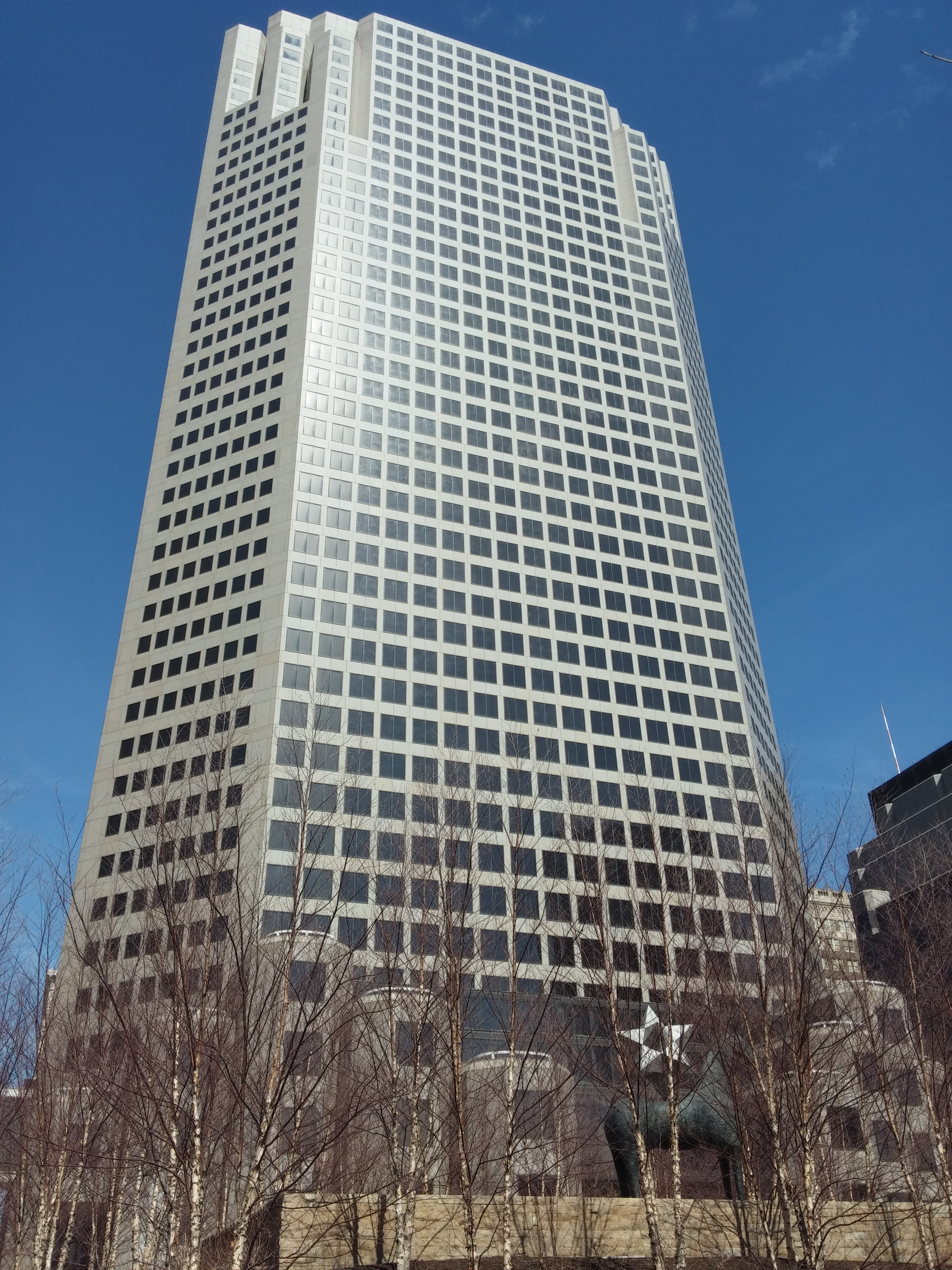
- Former names: One AT&T Center; One Bell Center; SBC Building; Southwestern Bell Telephone Building

General information
- Status: Completed
- Type: Commercial offices
- Location: 909 Chestnut Street; St. Louis, Missouri
- Coordinates: 38.6277°N 90.1946°W
- Completed: 1986; 40 years ago
- Cost: US$150 million
- Owner: The Goldman Group

Height
- Roof: 179 m (587 ft)

Technical details
- Floor count: 44
- Floor area: 1,400,000 sq ft (130,000 m^{2})
- Lifts/elevators: 24

Design and construction
- Architect: Hellmuth, Obata & Kassabaum
- Main contractor: McCarthy Construction, St. Louis, MO

Other information
- Public transit: MCT; MetroBus; Red Blue; At 8th & Pine station
- One Bell Center
- U.S. National Register of Historic Places
- NRHP reference No.: 100008205
- Added to NRHP: September 26, 2022

909 Chestnut (formerly One SBC Center, One Bell Center, One AT&T Center, and 909 Chestnut) is a 44-story building in downtown St. Louis, Missouri at 909 Chestnut Street on the Gateway Mall. It is Missouri's largest building by area with 1,400,000 square feet (130,000 m^{2}). The building is currently vacant.

The building was built to replace the Southwestern Bell Building as the Southwestern Bell world headquarters. However, in a series of mergers, the headquarters moved to San Antonio, Texas and was later renamed AT&T.

In 2006 Inland American Real Estate Trust bought the building for $205 million. AT&T then signed a 10-year lease to be the sole tenant.

When AT&T announced, in 2013, that they would be vacating the building in 12 months and that they would be not be renewing the lease when it expired in 2017, the number of employees in that building had fallen from a high of 4,800 to 2,000 through layoffs, outsourcing and remote work. The building was nominated for inclusion on the National Register of Historic Places in 2022, being listed that September.

The building was ultimately foreclosed by US Bank after AT&T's departure and, on April 25, 2022, the building was sold for $4.05 million to SomeraRoad, a New York–based developer. SomeraRoad later held an auction for the building in December 2023. It was sold to an entity tied to the Boston-based Goldman Group for $3.6 million in early April 2024 with the intent to convert it into apartments. In May 2025, Goldman Group announced that the renovation would be placed on hold due to the tabling of a state tax credit bill.

== See also ==
- List of tallest buildings in Missouri
- List of tallest buildings in St. Louis
- National Register of Historic Places listings in Downtown and Downtown West St. Louis
