= List of tallest buildings in Missouri =

The tallest structures in the U.S. state of Missouri include a 2,000-foot (610 m) broadcasting tower, an 800-foot (240 m) chimney, a 630-foot (190 m) monument, and a 624-foot (190 m) office building.

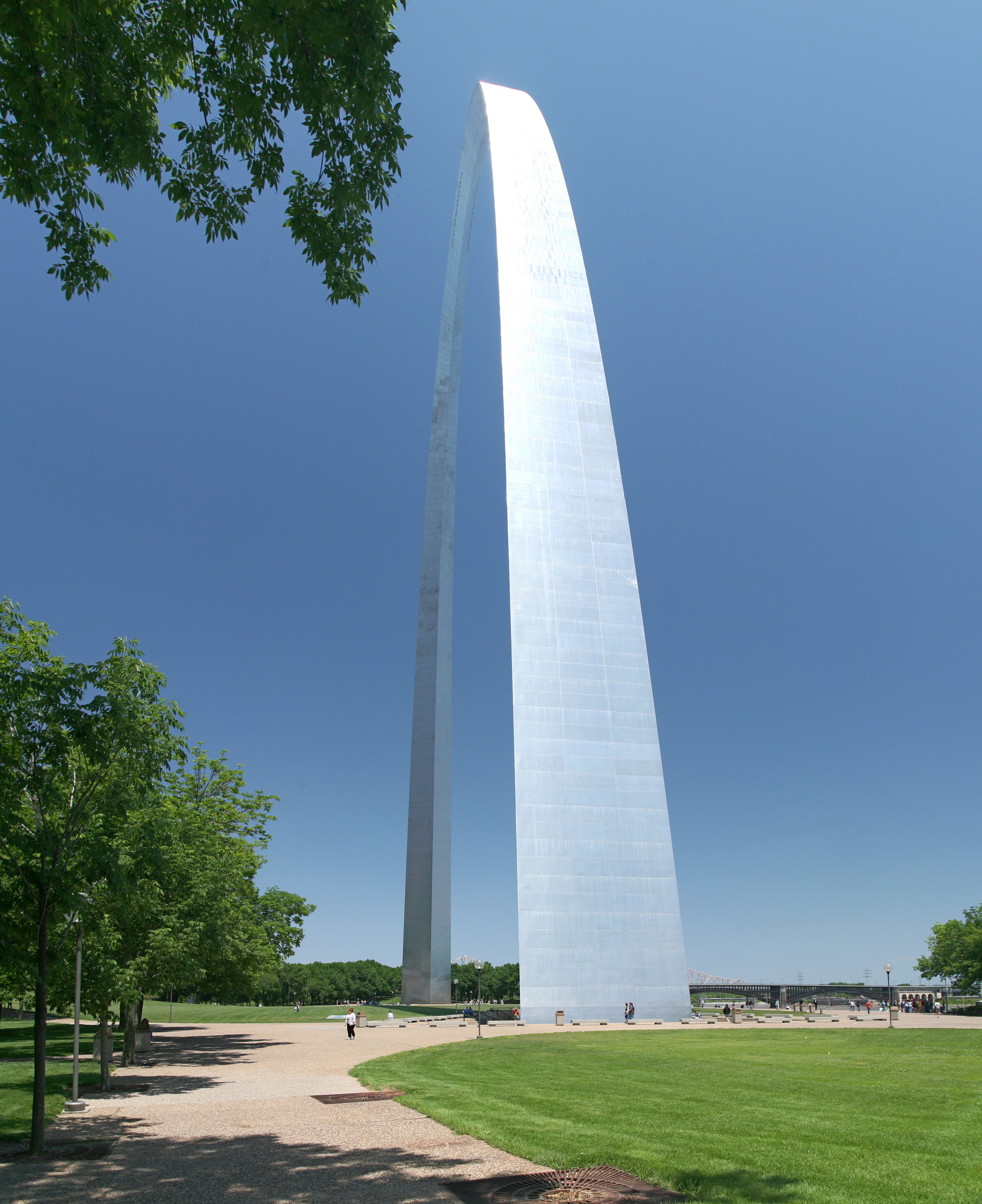
The tallest accessible structure in Missouri, the Gateway Arch in St. Louis

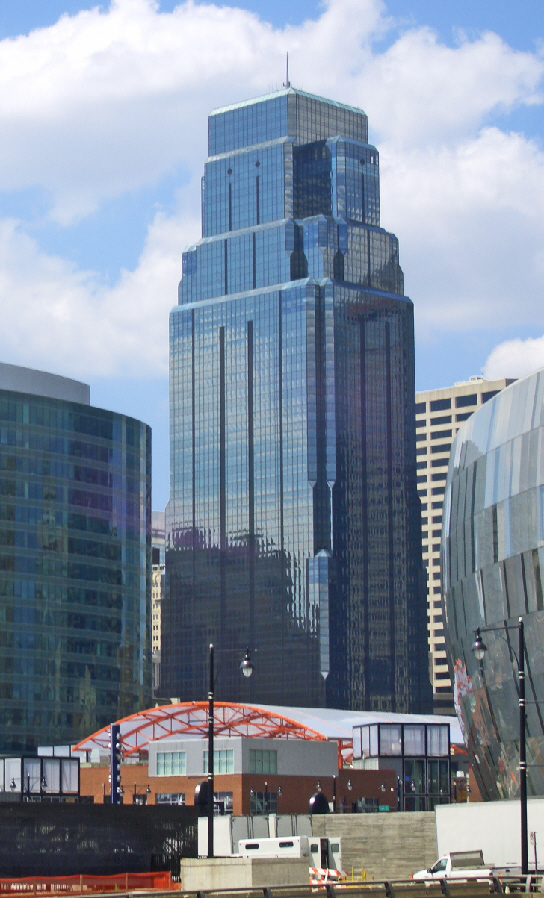
One Kansas City Place, 624 ft / 190.1m, tallest building in Missouri

== Missouri's tallest accessible buildings ==
Rank	Name	Image	Height feet / m	Floors	Year	Location	Links
-	Gateway Arch		630 ft (192 m)	N/A	1965	St. Louis	Tallest monument and memorial in the United States
1	One Kansas City Place		624 ft (190 m)	42	1988	Kansas City	Tallest office building in Missouri; including spire, 199.3 m (654 ft).
2	One Metropolitan Square		593 ft (181 m)	42	1989	St. Louis	
3	Town Pavilion		591 ft (180 m)	38	1986	Kansas City	
4	909 Chestnut Street		588 ft (179 m)	46	1986	St. Louis	
5	Thomas F. Eagleton United States Courthouse		557 ft (170 m)	29	2000	St. Louis	
6	Sheraton Kansas City Hotel at Crown Center		504 ft (154 m)	45	1980	Kansas City	Tallest hotel in Missouri
7	One US Bank Plaza		484 ft (148 m)	36	1976	St. Louis	
8	Kansas City Power and Light Building		481 ft (147 m)	34	1931	Kansas City	Converting to residential
9	909 Walnut		471 ft (144 m)	35	1931	Kansas City	Tallest residential in Missouri and Midwest outside Chicago
10	Kansas City City Hall		445 ft (136 m)	30	1937	Kansas City	4th-tallest City Hall in the world
11	Centene Centre		430 ft (130 m)	27	2019	Clayton	
12	1201 Walnut		427 ft (130 m)	30	1991	Kansas City	
13	Commerce Tower		421 ft (128 m)	32	1965	Kansas City	Upper 20 floors converting to residential
14	The Plaza in Clayton		409 ft (125 m)	31	2002	Clayton	
15	City Center Square		404 ft (123 m)	30	1978	Kansas City	
16	Laclede Gas Building		401 ft (122 m)	31	1969	St. Louis	

== Missouri's tallest structures ==
Name	Height feet / m	Location	Image	Links	Year
KMOS Tower/Rohn Tower	2,000 ft (610 m)	Syracuse			
KYTV Tower	1,999 ft (609 m)	Fordland			
KYTV Tower 2	1,996 ft (608 m)	Marshfield			
KOLR/KOZK Tower	1,960 ft (600 m)	Fordland			
Raycom America Tower	1,677 ft (511 m)	Cape Girardeau			
KBSI Tower	1,567 ft (478 m)	Cape Girardeau			

== Missouri's tallest chimneys ==
Name	Height feet / m	Location	Links	Year
Associated Electric Stack #1	800 ft (240 m)	New Madrid		
Iatan Power Plant Stack	700 ft (210 m)	Iatan		
Rush Island Power Station	700 ft (210 m)	Rush Island		
Labadie Power Station Units 3 & 4	700 ft (210 m)	Labadie		
Labadie Power Station Unit 2	700 ft (210 m)	Labadie		
Labadie Power Station Unit 1	700 ft (210 m)	Labadie		
Sibley Generator Station Stack	700 ft (210 m)	Sibley		
Associated Electric Stack #2	630 ft (190 m)	New Madrid		
Thomas Hill Chimney	620 ft (190 m)	Clifton Hill		
Sioux Power Plant Stack #1	603 ft (184 m)	Portage Des Sioux		
Sioux Power Plant Stack #2	603 ft (184 m)	Portage Des Sioux		
Hawthorne Power Plant	600 ft (180 m)	Kansas City		
Callaway Cooling Tower	553 ft (169 m)	Fulton		
Herculaneum Smelter Stack	550 ft (170 m)	Herculaneum		

== History of Missouri's tallest habitable buildings ==
Name	Height feet / m	Location	Year	Links
Old Courthouse	194 ft (59 m)	St. Louis	1864	
Union Station	230 ft (70 m)	St. Louis	1894	
Commerce Trust Building	258 ft (79 m)	Kansas City	1907	
Railway Exchange Building	277 ft (84 m)	St. Louis	1914	
Federal Reserve Bank Building	298 ft (91 m)	Kansas City	1921	
Southwestern Bell Building	397 ft (121 m)	St. Louis	1926	
Kansas City Power and Light Building	476 ft (145 m)	Kansas City	1931	
One US Bank Plaza	484 ft (148 m)	St. Louis	1976	
Town Pavilion	591 ft (180 m)	Kansas City	1986	
One Kansas City Place	624 ft (190 m)	Kansas City	1988	

== See also ==
- List of tallest buildings in Kansas City, Missouri
- List of tallest buildings in St. Louis
- List of tallest buildings by U.S. state and territory
- List of tallest buildings in the United States
