= One City Center (St. Louis) =

Office tower complex in Missouri

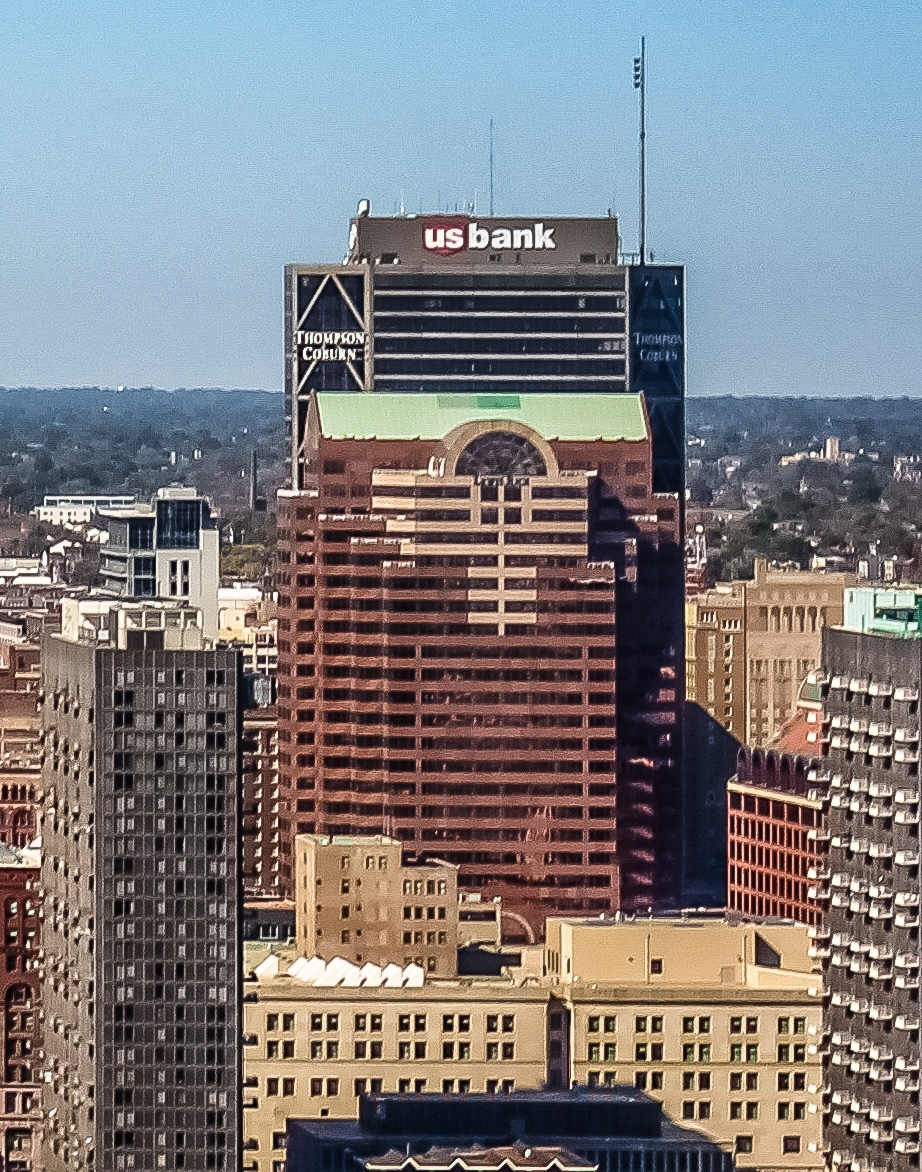
- One City Center in 2016
- Interactive map of the One City Center area

General information
- Status: Completed
- Type: Office
- Location: 515 North 6th Street, St. Louis, Missouri, United States
- Coordinates: 38.6303°N 90.1899°W

Height
- Roof: 375 feet (114 m)

Technical details
- Floor count: 25

Other information
- Public transit: MCT; MetroBus; Red Blue; At Convention Center

One City Center (also called 600 Washington, St. Louis Centre, and sometimes spelled One City Centre) is an office tower complex and former shopping mall in St. Louis, Missouri.

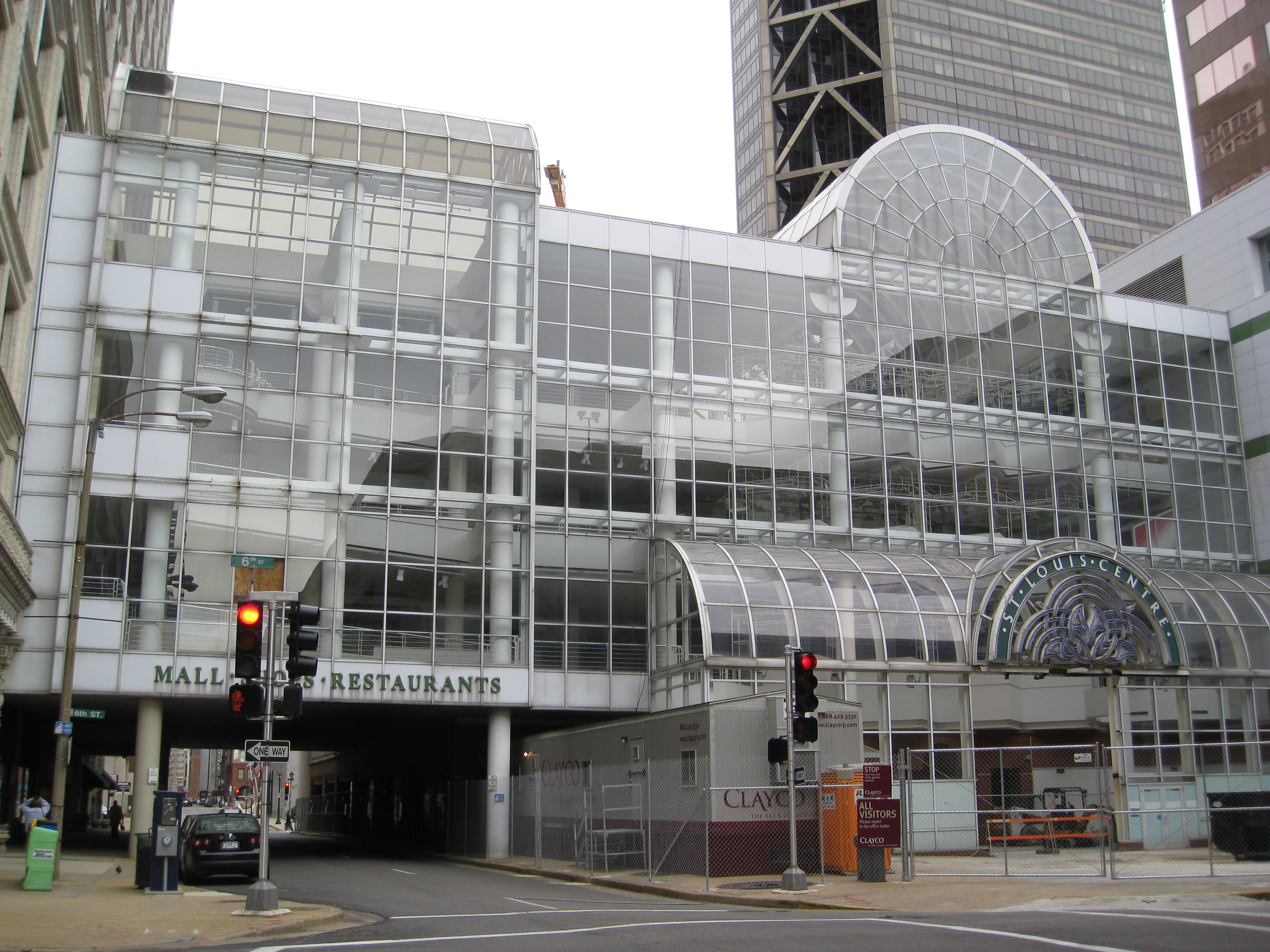
Mall entrance in 2010 before redevelopment

The 25-story office tower is the ninth-tallest habitable building in St. Louis at a height of 375 feet (114 m). The mall was four stories with a green, white, and glass façade. When the mall opened in 1985, St. Louis Centre was the largest urban shopping mall in the United States, with over 150 stores with 20 restaurants in 1,500,000 square feet (140,000 m^{2}).

== History ==
The $95 million complex was originally to be developed by the May Company and called May Mall, but development for the mall was given to the Simon Property Group.

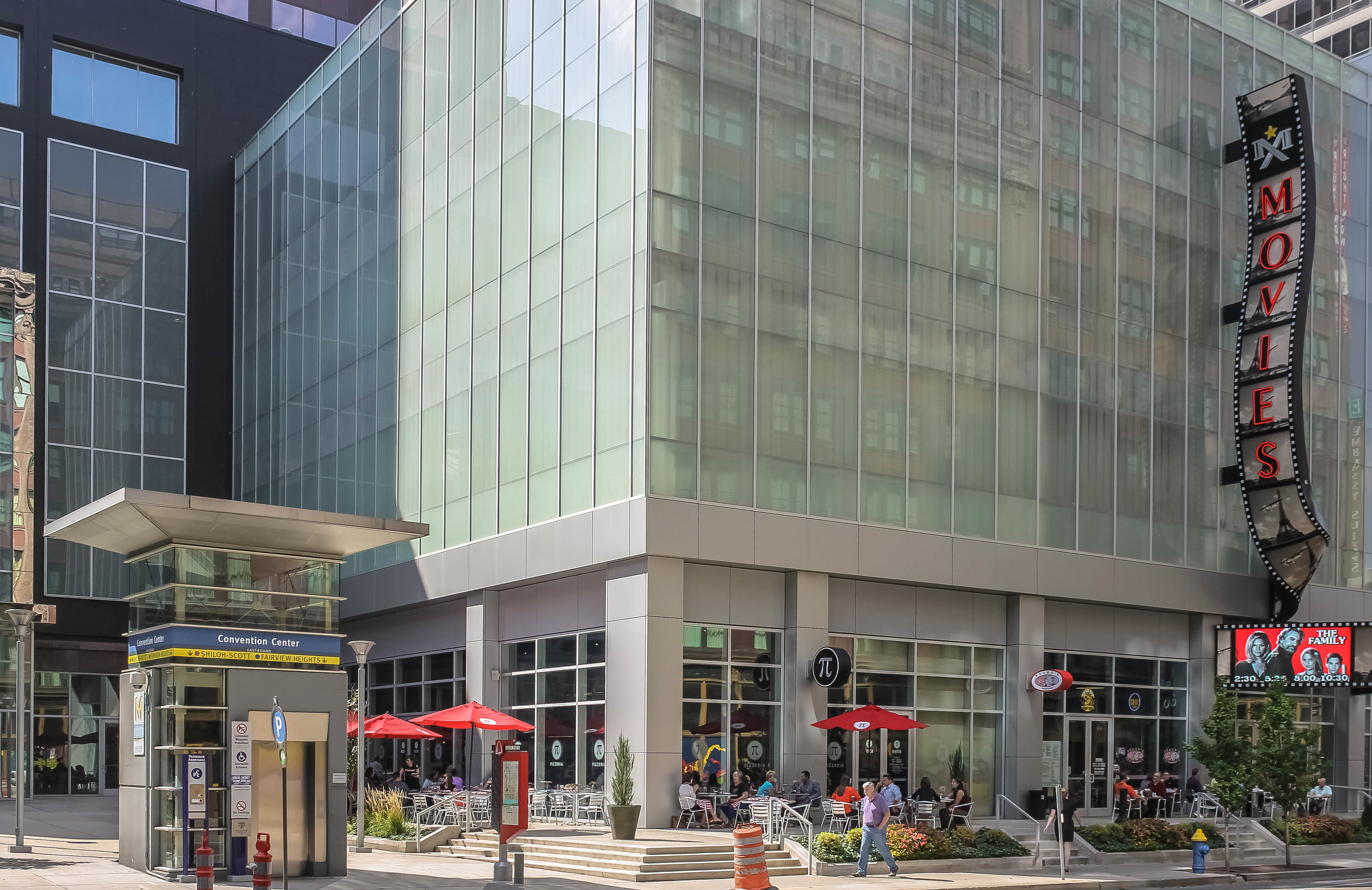
The former mall in 2016 after redevelopment

St. Louis Centre opened in 1985, with anchor stores Famous-Barr at one end and Dillard's at the other. The mall was initially popular and featured national chain stores.

The Famous-Barr store was the company's flagship outlet; the building also contained that company's corporate offices and the corporate headquarters of the May Company. The Dillard's location was once the flagship of its chain, as well as the headquarters of Stix, Baer and Fuller, a local chain that Dillard's acquired just as construction on the mall began.

The mall faced new competition after the 1991 redevelopment of the former Westroads Shopping Center into the St. Louis Galleria. By the mid-1990s, Dillard's converted its location into one of its clearance stores, and no longer carried regular day-to-day merchandise, this location closed for good in 2001.

In 2006, the almost-vacant "dead mall" closed, and was bought by The Pyramid Companies and was planned to be turned into condominiums and retail space, though the plan was never realized, as Pyramid closed in 2008 due to financial troubles. The mall was foreclosed in 2009 by lender Bank of America and later bought for $12.7 million by Environmental Operations. In 2009, the building was about 85% vacant, and other developers were trying to raise funding for a renovation of the mall. Plans included a $35 million renovation, turning much of the complex into parking space, as well as a $29 million project to attract tenants to the center's office tower. The project, led by investor Stacy Hastie, includes plans for local law firm Lewis, Rice & Fingersh and accounting firm LarsonAllen LLP to move into the building. Earlier, the Missouri Development Finance Board had approved a $5 million loan for the project. In May 2010, work began to convert part of the building into a 750-car parking garage and retail/entertainment complex called Mercantile Exchange. The skybridges to the Famous-Barr Railway Exchange Building (St. Louis) and the former Stix, Baer and Fuller / Dillard's store (now referred to as The Laurel Building) have now been demolished to open up Washington and Locust streets.
