= Laclede Gas Building =

Skyscraper in St. Louis, Missouri

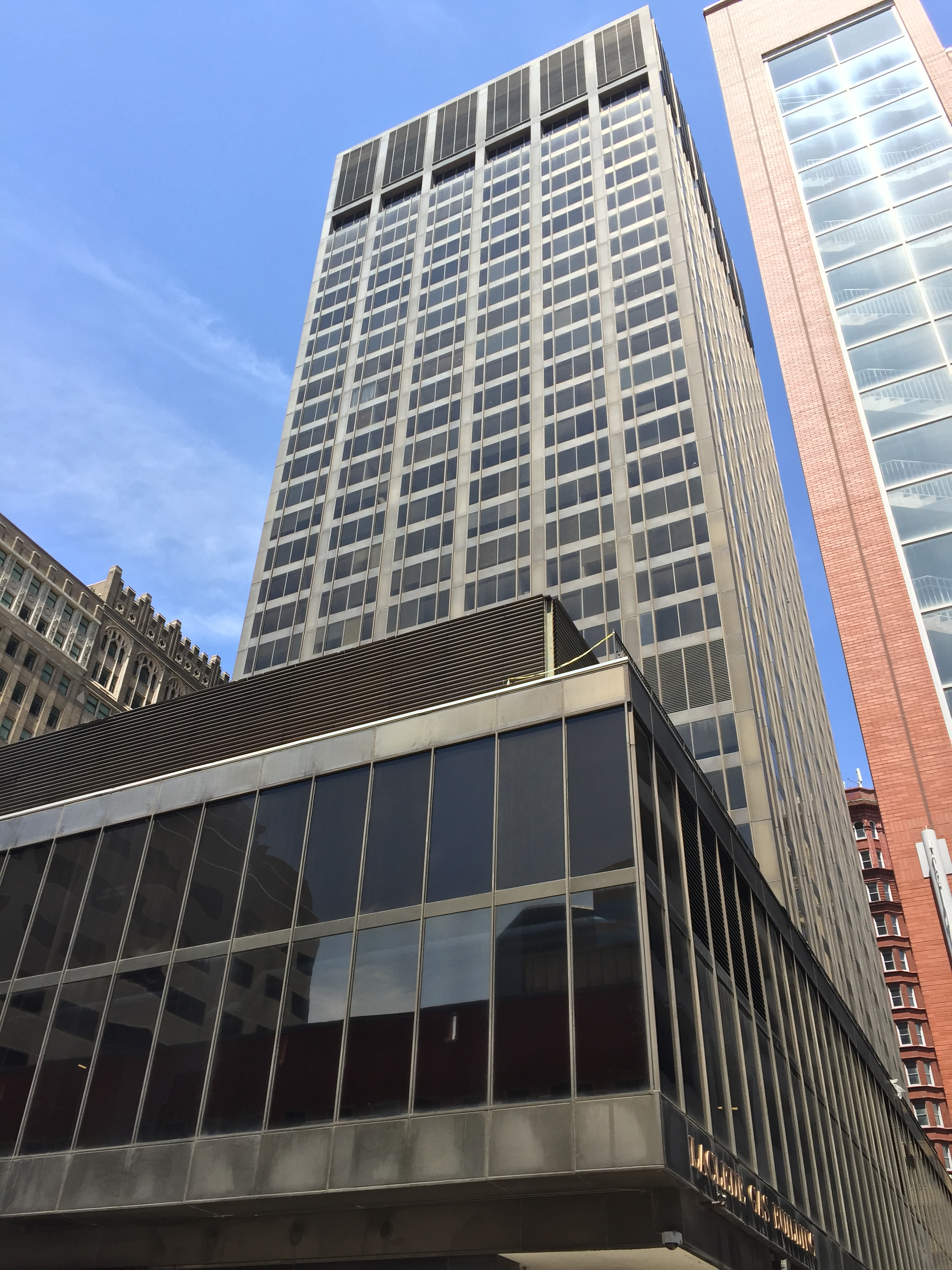
- Laclede Gas Building, May 2018
- Interactive map of the Laclede Gas Building area

General information
- Status: Completed
- Type: Commercial offices
- Architectural style: International style
- Location: 720 Olive; St. Louis, Missouri
- Coordinates: 38.6282°N 90.1922°W
- Completed: 1967 - 1969
- Owner: Brandonview LLC

Height
- Roof: 122 m (400 ft)

Technical details
- Floor count: 31
- Floor area: 434,912 sq ft (40,404.6 m^{2})

Design and construction
- Architect: Emery Roth & Sons

Other information
- Public transit access: MCT; MetroBus; Red Blue; At 8th & Pine station

The Laclede Gas Building is a 31-story, 122 m (400 ft) skyscraper located at 720 Olive Street in Downtown St. Louis, Missouri. It was designed by the Emery Roth & Sons architecture firm, and was built between 1967 and 1969 for the Laclede Gas Company, which had outgrown its 10-story building at 1017 Olive Street. The Laclede Gas Company vacated the building in March 2015, after 45 years in the space. The building has since been converted to mixed-use, and presently consists of both office and residential spaces.

Uniquely, all power for the building is generated in-house using natural gas burning generators, and therefore is not interconnected to the Ameren power grid.

The building also houses one of the eastbound entrances to MetroLink's 8th & Pine subway station.

As of January 2025, the building is for sale.

== See also ==
- List of tallest buildings in Missouri
- List of tallest buildings in St. Louis
