= One US Bank Plaza =

Skyscraper building in Downtown St. Louis

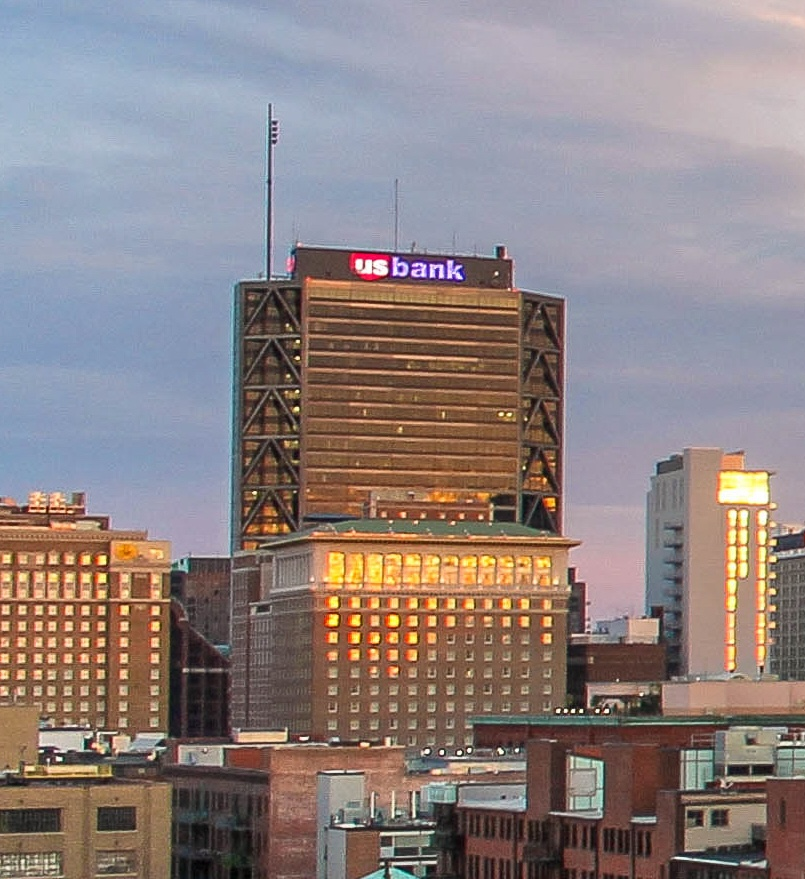
- One US Bank Plaza in 2012
- Interactive map of the One US Bank Plaza area

General information
- Status: Completed
- Type: Commercial offices
- Location: 505 North 7th Street; St. Louis, Missouri
- Coordinates: 38.6300°N 90.1909°W
- Completed: 1976; 50 years ago

Height
- Antenna spire: 592 ft (180 m)
- Roof: 484 ft (148 m)

Technical details
- Floor count: 35

Design and construction
- Architect: Thompson, Ventulett, Stainback & Associates

Other information
- Public transit access: MCT; MetroBus

One US Bank Plaza (formerly One Mercantile Center) is a 36-story building in Downtown St. Louis, Missouri. The 147.5 m (484 ft) building is topped by an antenna that raises the total building to 589 feet (180 m). In the 1990s the Ambassador Building next to it was razed and became part of the building's plaza.

The building has a Structural Expressionism style. It was originally built for Mercantile Bancorporation which was bought out by Firstar in 1999 and then became U.S. Bancorp in 2001.

== Major occupants ==
- Thompson Coburn, LLP
- US Bank

== See also ==
- List of tallest buildings in Missouri
- List of tallest buildings in St. Louis
