= Bank of America Plaza (St. Louis) =

Skyscraper located in Downtown St. Louis, Missouri

Coordinates: 38.6259°N 90.1940°W

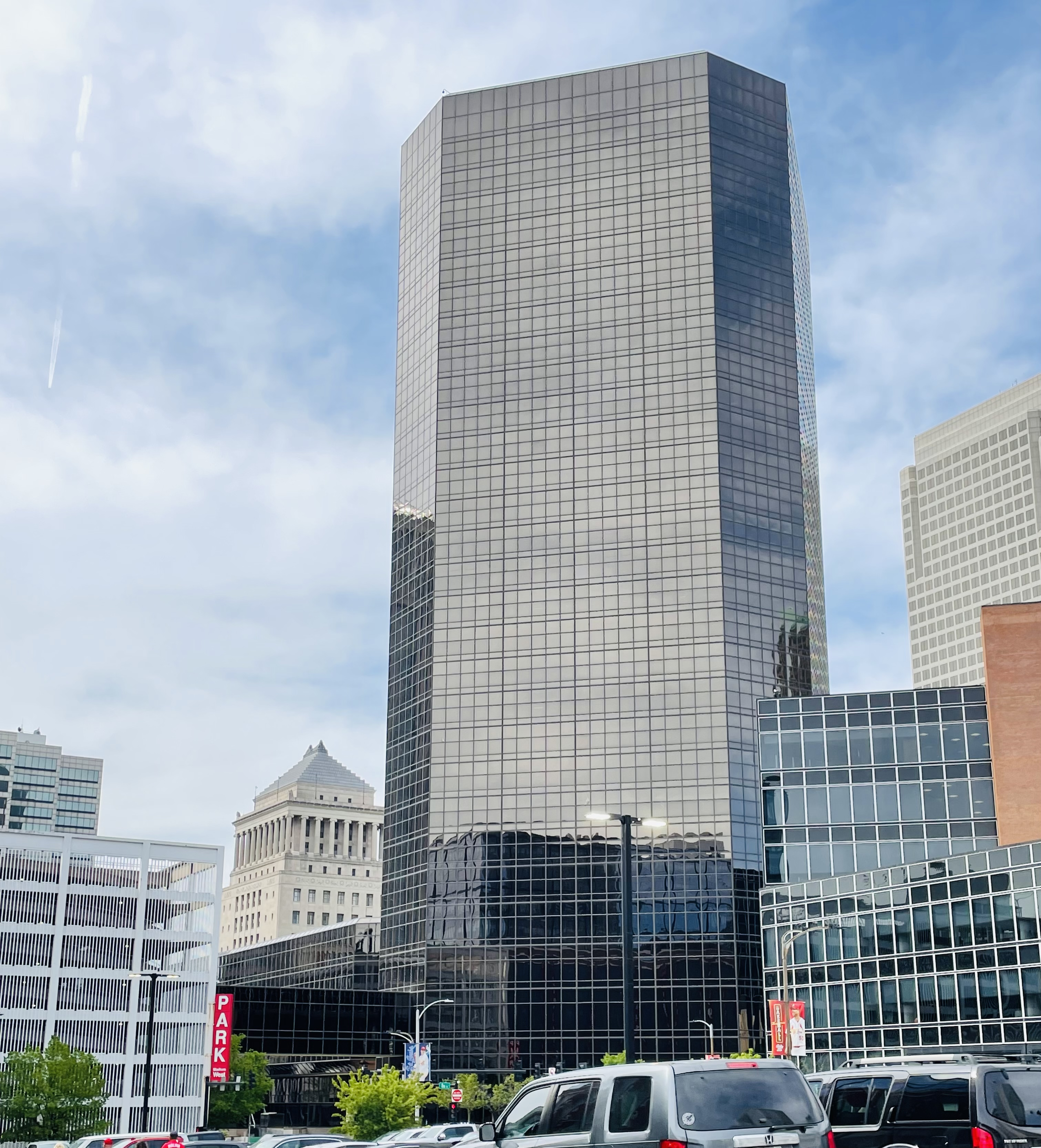
Bank of America Plaza, seen from 7th street.

The Bank of America Plaza is a skyscraper located in Downtown St. Louis, Missouri. Formerly Boatmen's Bancshares of St. Louis and First National Bank, the tower is 384 ft (117m) tall and has 31 floors. Built in 1982 by Fruin-Colnon Construction, it comprises 750,000 square feet (70,000 m^{2}), and has a view of the downtown skyline. It is the fourth largest office building in Downtown St. Louis.

The building won the Building Owners and Managers Association (BOMA) “Building of the Year” awards for the years 1996 through 1999.

Ralcorp and subsidiary Post Foods have their headquarters in the building. In 2003, Bank of America was the largest tenant in the building and had nearly 500,000 square feet (46,000 m^{2}) of space. During that year PricewaterhouseCoopers leased space in the Bank of America Plaza, which was 96% occupied.

== History ==
In 2003, the General Electric Pension Trust, the owner of the Bank of America Plaza, offered to sell the building. In August 2014, part of the staff of Laclede Group was moved to the building.

== See also ==
- List of tallest buildings in St. Louis
