= Lennox Hotel =

- U.S. National Register of Historic Places
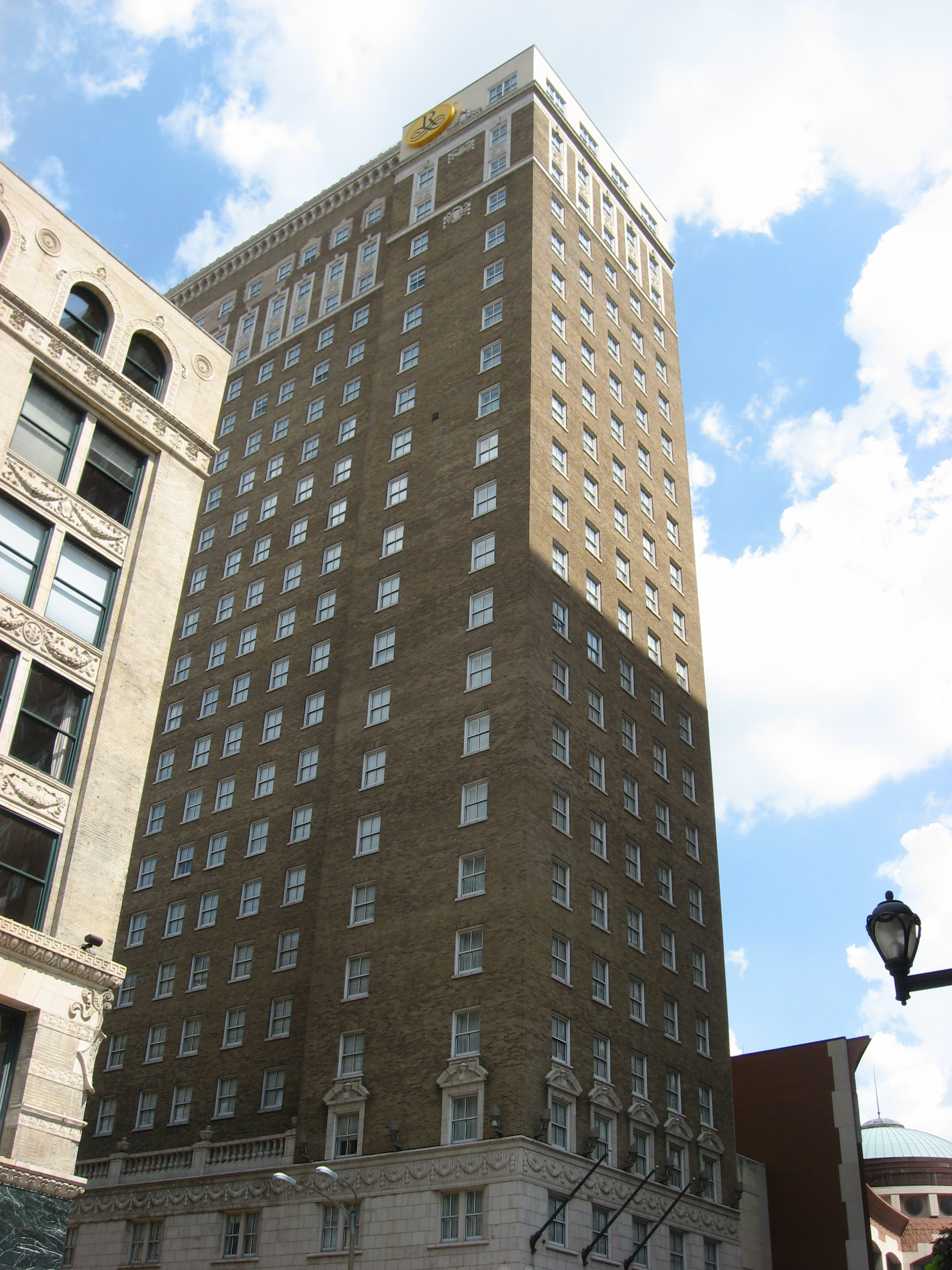
- Renaissance St. Louis Suites Hotel, 2013

- Location within St. Louis Location within Missouri Location within the United States
- Location: 823-827 Washington Ave., St. Louis, Missouri
- Coordinates: 38°37′51″N 90°11′33″W
- Area: less than one acre
- Built: 1929
- Architect: Preston J. Bradshaw
- Architectural style: Renaissance
- NRHP reference No.: 84002647
- Added to NRHP: September 6, 1984

The Courtyard by Marriott St. Louis Downtown/Convention Center is a historic hotel in downtown St. Louis, Missouri.

== History ==
The 25-story hotel opened on September 2, 1929, as the Lennox Hotel, the tallest hotel in the city at the time. Designed by Preston J. Bradshaw in the Renaissance Revival style, the building features terra cotta facades and cornices. The hotel, along with the Hotel Statler and the Mayfair Hotel, was built as part of a commercial boom in downtown St. Louis in the 1920s. It was the last hotel built in the area before the Great Depression; another hotel did not open in downtown St. Louis until 1963. The Lennox Hotel closed after newer hotels were built in the 1970s. The hotel was added to the National Register of Historic Places on September 6, 1984.

It was renovated in 2002 and reopened as the Renaissance St. Louis Suites Hotel. The hotel was foreclosed on in 2009 by its bondholders after it failed to generate enough revenue to cover interest payments. It closed in November 2011. It was sold in December 2013 to Maritz, Wolff & Co., which spent $15 million on a complete renovation. It reopened on September 2, 2015, as the Courtyard by Marriott St. Louis Downtown/Convention Center.
