= Thomas F. Eagleton United States Courthouse =

United States Federal Court House

Coordinates: 38.6254°N 90.1970°W

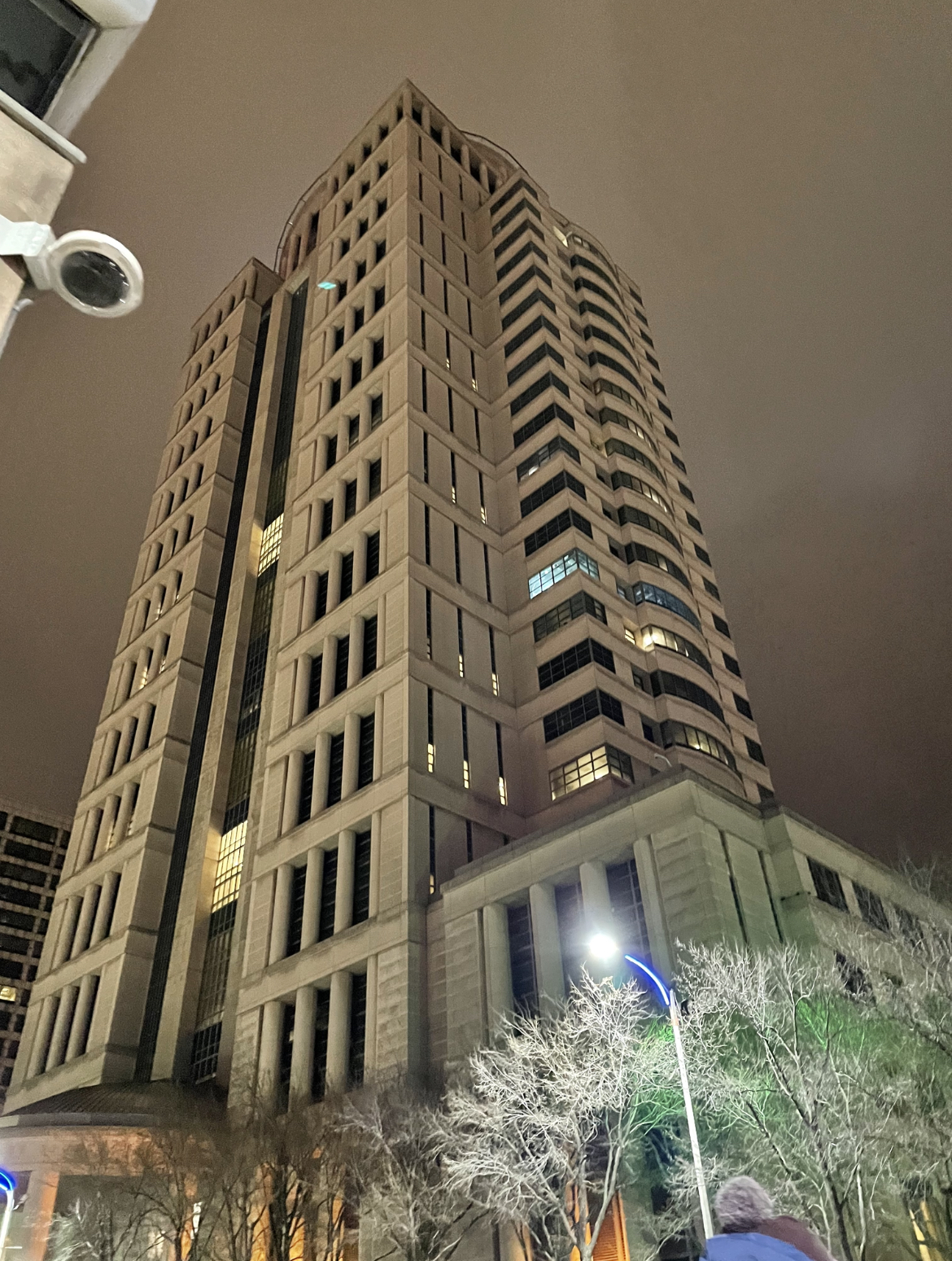
Thomas F. Eagleton United States Courthouse, pictured at night, on Clark avenue.

The Thomas F. Eagleton United States Courthouse is the largest single courthouse in the United States. It is the main office of the United States District Court for the Eastern District of Missouri and the United States Court of Appeals for the Eighth Circuit. It was named after U.S. senator Thomas F. Eagleton.

The courthouse is 29 stories tall and covers 987,775 square feet (91,767.3 m^{2}). It is the fifth tallest habitable building in Missouri. It is located in downtown St. Louis at 111 South 10th Street. The exterior of the courthouse follows a classical tripartite scheme that uses the split-level stacking concept. Its height is 557 feet (170 m). The construction of the building was completed in 2000. The architects involved with the building were Hellmuth, Obata & Kassabaum and EDM Incorporated. The building cost $186 million to build.

== See also ==
- List of tallest buildings in Missouri
- List of tallest buildings in St. Louis
