= Queeny Tower =

Coordinates: 38.6357°N 90.2661°W

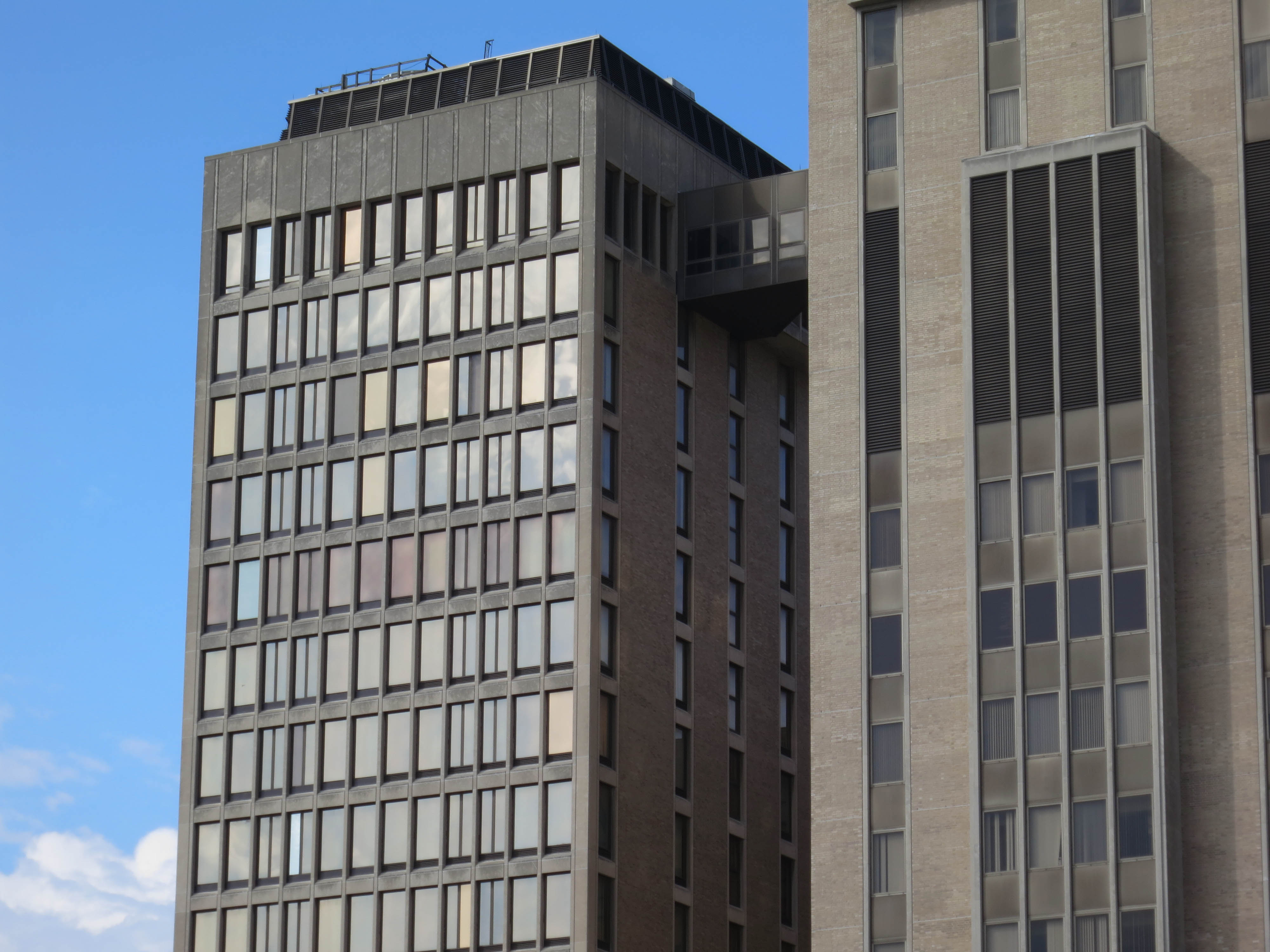
Queeny Tower

Queeny Tower, built in 1965 and named for Monsanto Company founder John Francis Queeny, was a former medical facility on the campus of Washington University School of Medicine. At 321 feet (98 m), it was the third tallest medical-related building in the Western Hemisphere, as well as the second tallest building (after the Park East Tower) in St. Louis outside the downtown area. The building closed in November 2019 and demolition of the building began in March 2021 to make way for a new 16-story inpatient tower.
