= Marquette Building (St. Louis) =

- Boatmen's Bank Building
- U.S. National Register of Historic Places
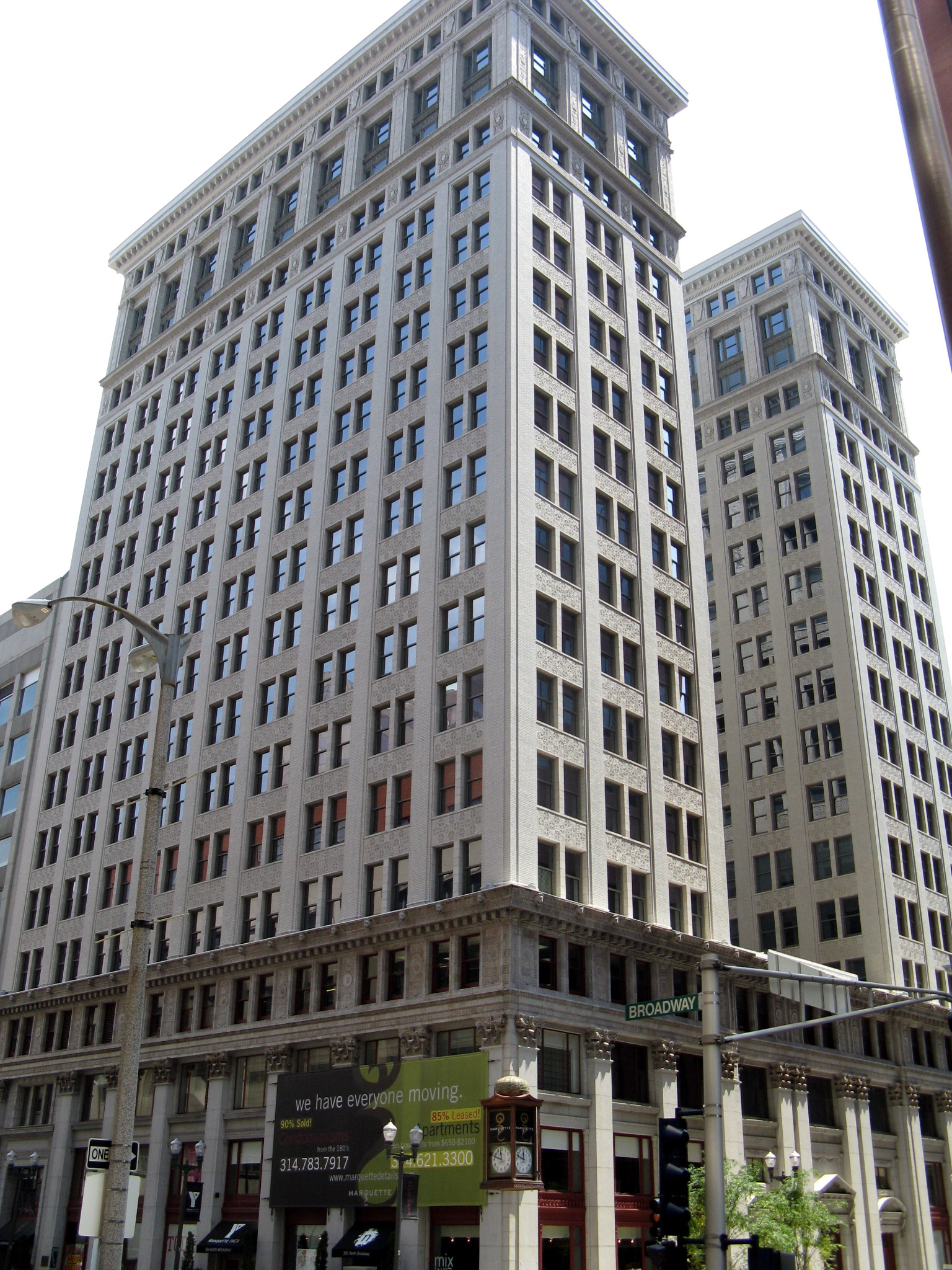

- Location within St. Louis Location within Missouri Location within the United States
- Location: 300 North Broadway, St. Louis, Missouri
- Coordinates: 38°37′41″N 90°11′19″W
- Built: 1913
- Architect: Eames & Young
- Architectural style: Classical Revival
- NRHP reference No.: 98001265
- Added to NRHP: October 22, 1998

The Marquette Building, also known as the Boatmen's Bank Building, is a historical building in downtown St. Louis.

It was completed in 1914 at Broadway and Olive Streets, at 19 stories, designed by the St. Louis architecture partnership of Eames & Young. The building stands at 20 stories with a 2-story penthouse atop the 20th floor. A 1915 Annex, also designed by Eames & Young, was razed in 1998. The Marquette Building was added to the National Register of Historic Places the same year, and was redeveloped for condos in 2007. The building roof sports a small pool atop the eastern wing and a dog park/ relief area on the western wing, that are available to building residents.
