= John Mauran =

American architect (1866–1933)

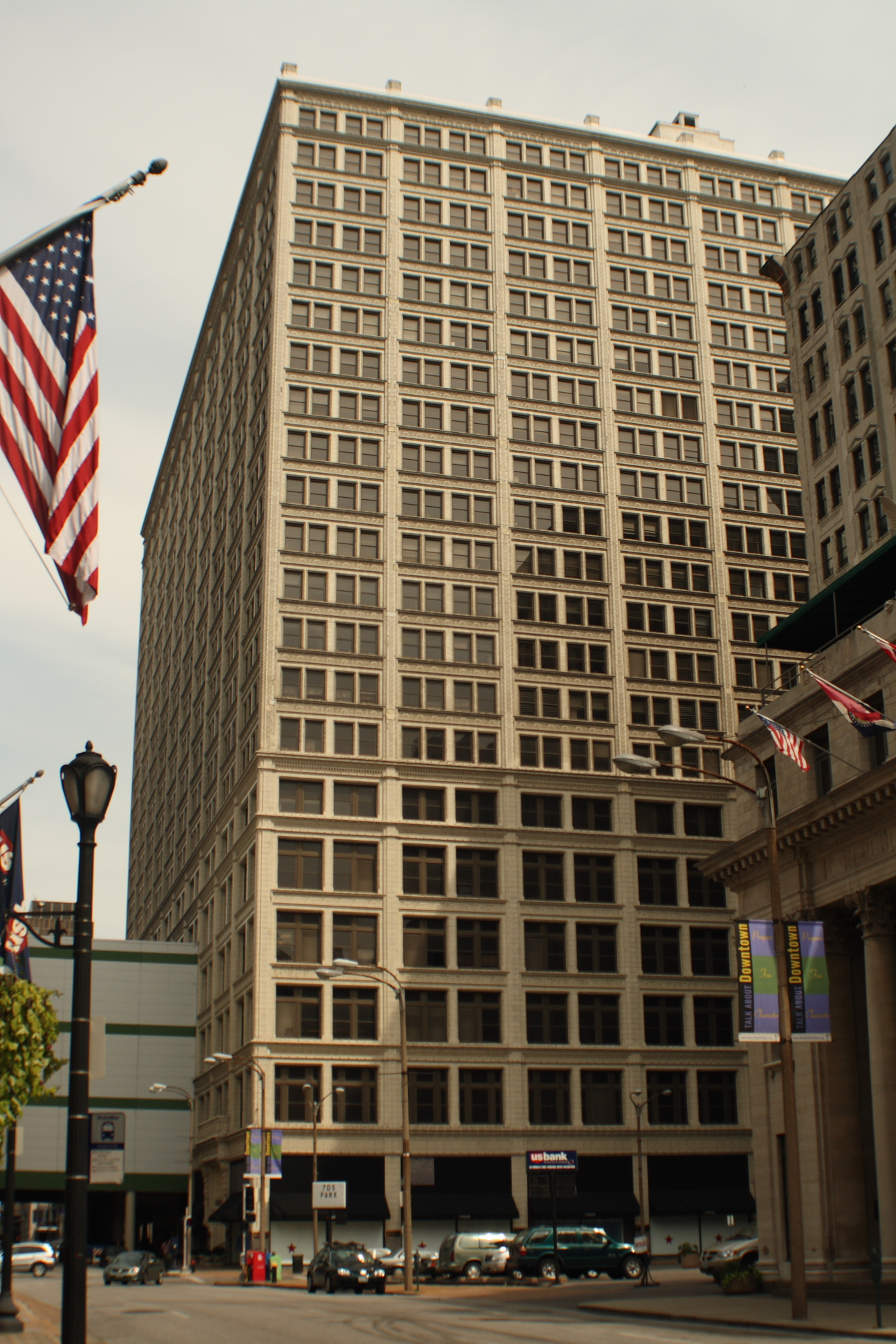
Railway Exchange Building (St. Louis), 1913

John Lawrence Mauran, FAIA (1866–1933) was an American architect responsible for many downtown landmarks in St. Louis, Missouri. He was also active in Wisconsin and Texas.

== Life ==
Mauran was born in Providence, Rhode Island and studied at the Massachusetts Institute of Technology from 1885 through 1889, under the French-American educator Eugene Letang. While there, he was a member of the fraternity of Delta Psi St. Anthony Hall).

== Career ==
He entered the Boston office of Shepley, Rutan and Coolidge as a young draftsman. There he helped design the 1893 Chicago Public Library (now the Chicago Cultural Center) and the 1894 Art Institute of Chicago.

Sent by the firm to establish a branch office in St. Louis, his employers closed shop there in 1900 and Mauran formed his own partnership, Mauran, Russell & Garden, with Ernest John Russell and Edward Garden. After the departure of Garden in 1909 it was briefly known as Mauran & Russell, but with the addition of William DeForest Crowell it became Mauran, Russell & Crowell in 1911. The firm carved out a niche designing Carnegie libraries in towns in Missouri, Wisconsin, and Kansas. Mauran had also married a local socialite, Isabel Chapman, in 1899, which aided his social connections, bringing commissions for local churches, office buildings, and a number of sizable mansions in St. Louis's new private places. He himself lived at #40 Vandeventer Place, on the most prestigious street in the city.

In 1902, Mauran became a Fellow of the American Institute of Architects, and was appointed by Theodore Roosevelt to the first United States Commission of Fine Arts in 1910. In 1915, he was elected President of the AIA; in 1925, he served as head of the St. Louis Memorial Plaza Commission. Mauran died unexpectedly after an appendicitis attack in 1933, at the family's summer home in New Hampshire.

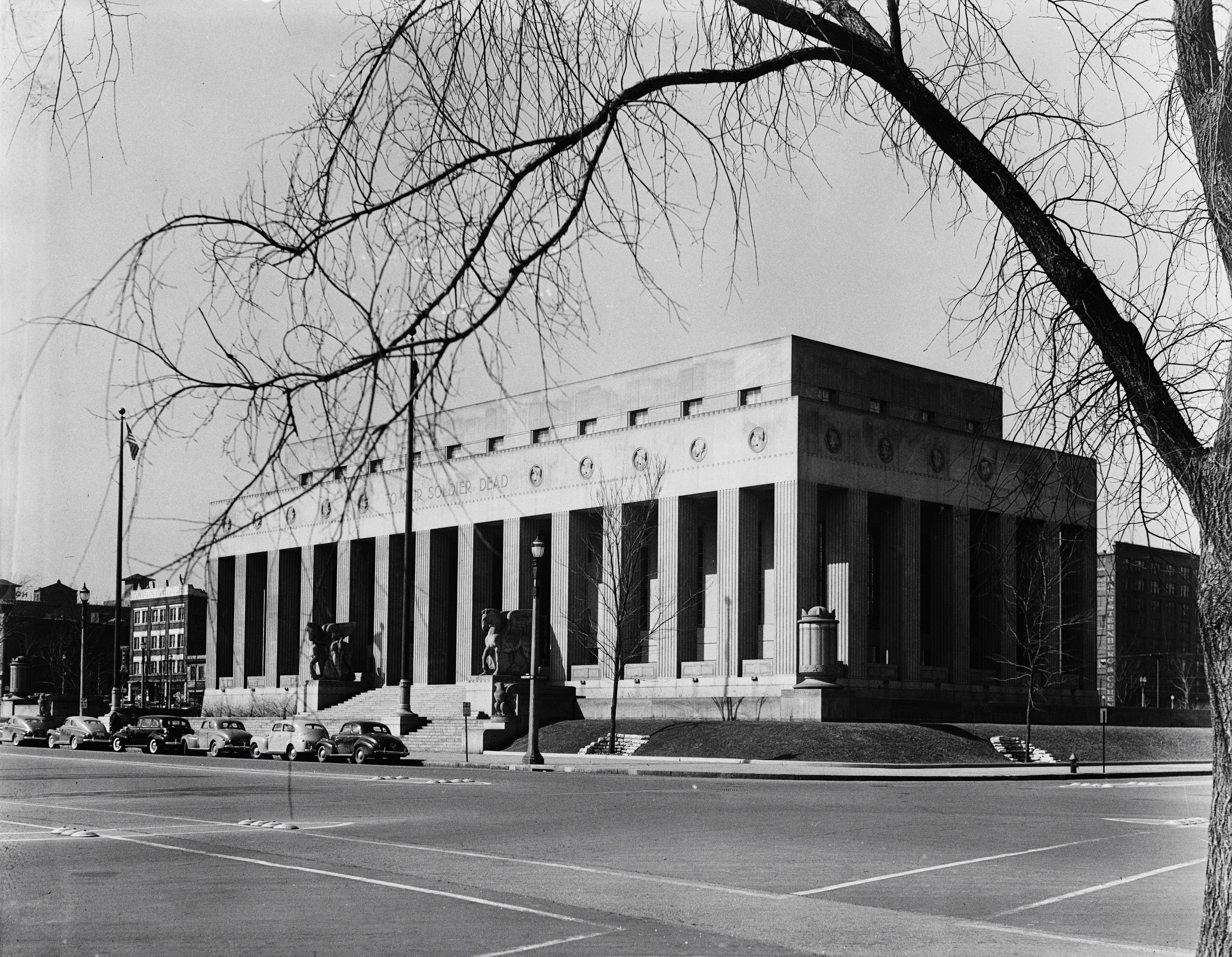
Soldiers' Memorial, St. Louis

== Work ==
Stylistically versatile through its decades of activity, Mauran's office was more commercially than artistically oriented, with work concentrated in the St. Louis area and a large number of hotel commissions in Texas. The St. Louis high-rises of the 1900s and 1910s show a clear influence from the Sullivan skyscrapers they stand next to, like the Wainwright Building, without Sullivan's distinctive ornament.

The stripped-classical style of the St. Louis Soldiers' Memorial, in 1939 a late example of its kind, is appropriate for its civic presence. Like other public buildings in the downtown Civic Plaza, the initial plans were far more elaborate, before delay and budget pressures left the actual results simplified and scaled down.

W.O. Mullgardt joined the firm in 1930. When Mauran died in 1933, this left William Crowell as its principal designer. The modernist 1941 Post-Dispatch Printing Plant, with its long ribbons of windows, preceded other International Style buildings in St. Louis by about nine years. This was the firm's final major work.

== Select projects ==
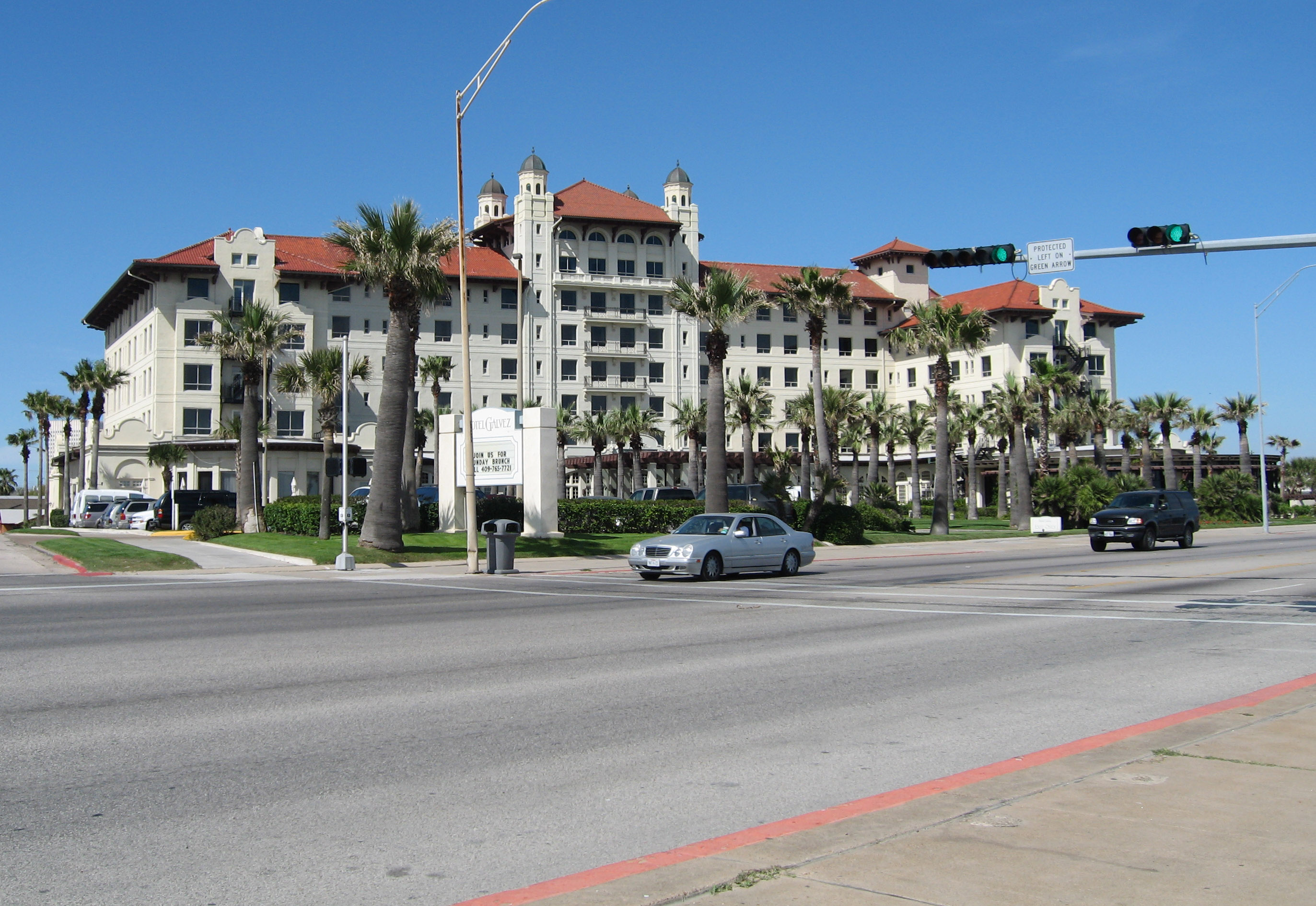
Hotel Galvez, Galveston, Texas, 1911

- Laclede Power Company plant, St. Louis, Missouri,1901
- First Church of Christ Scientist, St. Louis, Missouri, 1903 (Holy Corners Historic District)
- Racine Public Library, Racine, Wisconsin, 1904
- residences in private places Portland Place and Washington Terrace, St. Louis, Missouri, 1905-1909
- Racquet Club, St. Louis, Missouri, 1906 (Holy Corners Historic District)
- Second Baptist Church, St. Louis, Missouri, 1907 (Holy Corners Historic District)
- Grand Leader Department Store, later Stix Baer & Fuller, Washington and 6th Avenue, St. Louis, Missouri, 1906
- Gunter Hotel, San Antonio, Texas, 1909
- Grand Leader Department Store Model Annex, Washington and 6th Avenue, St. Louis, Missouri, 1911
- Laclede Gas Light Company Building, St. Louis, Missouri, 1911
- Dallas Municipal Building (as associate architects), Dallas, Texas, 1912
- Galvez Hotel, Galveston, Texas, 1912
- Railway Exchange Building, St. Louis, Missouri, 1913
- Empire Theater and Brady Building, San Antonio, 1913
- Rice Hotel, Houston, Texas, 1913.
- St. Louis and San Francisco Railroad Building, Joplin, Missouri, 1913
- Federal Reserve Bank of St Louis, St. Louis, Missouri, 1923
- Union Market, St. Louis, Missouri, 1924
- Southwestern Bell Building, St. Louis, Missouri, 1926
- Police Headquarters and Police Academy, St. Louis, Missouri, 1927-1928
- Missouri Pacific Building, St. Louis, Missouri, 1928
- Blackstone Hotel, Fort Worth, Texas, 1929
- St. Louis Globe-Democrat Building, St. Louis, Missouri, 1931
- Federal Courts Building, St. Louis, Missiouri, 1932-1934
- Soldiers' Memorial, with architectural sculpture by Walker Hancock, St. Louis, Missouri, 1936
- St. Louis Post-Dispatch Printing Plant, St. Louis, Missouri, 1941
