= Southwestern Bell Building =

Skyscraper in downtown St. Louis, Missouri

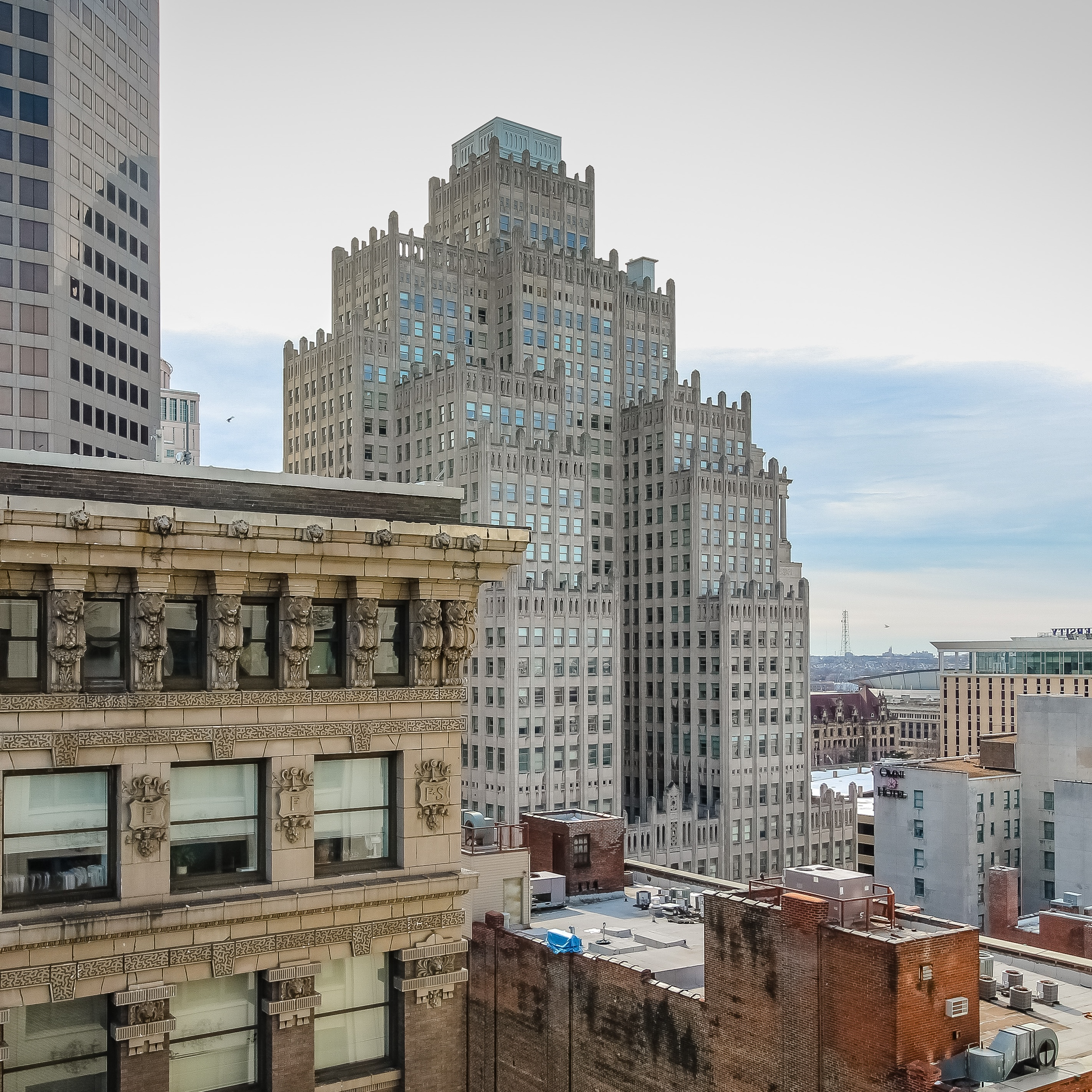
- Southwestern Bell Building in 2016
- Interactive map of the Southwestern Bell Building area

General information
- Status: Completed
- Type: Commercial offices
- Architectural style: Neo-Gothic
- Location: 1010 Pine Street; St. Louis, Missouri
- Coordinates: 38.6281°N 90.1955°W
- Completed: 1926; 100 years ago

Height
- Roof: 399 ft (122 m)

Technical details
- Floor count: 28

Design and construction
- Architects: Mauran, Russell, & Crowell

The Southwestern Bell Building is a 28-story, 121.0 m (397.0 ft) skyscraper constructed to be the headquarters of Southwestern Bell Telephone in downtown St. Louis, Missouri. At the time of its construction it was Missouri's tallest building.

The building, which was one of the first in St. Louis to use setbacks, has 17 individual roofs.

Its architect was Mauran, Russell & Crowell, who also designed the Federal Reserve Bank of St Louis and the Railway Exchange Building (St. Louis). I.R. Timlin, Southwestern Bell's company architect, was associate architect on the project.
