= Millennium Hotel St. Louis =

Hotel complex in St. Louis, Missouri

Millennium Hotel Tower I
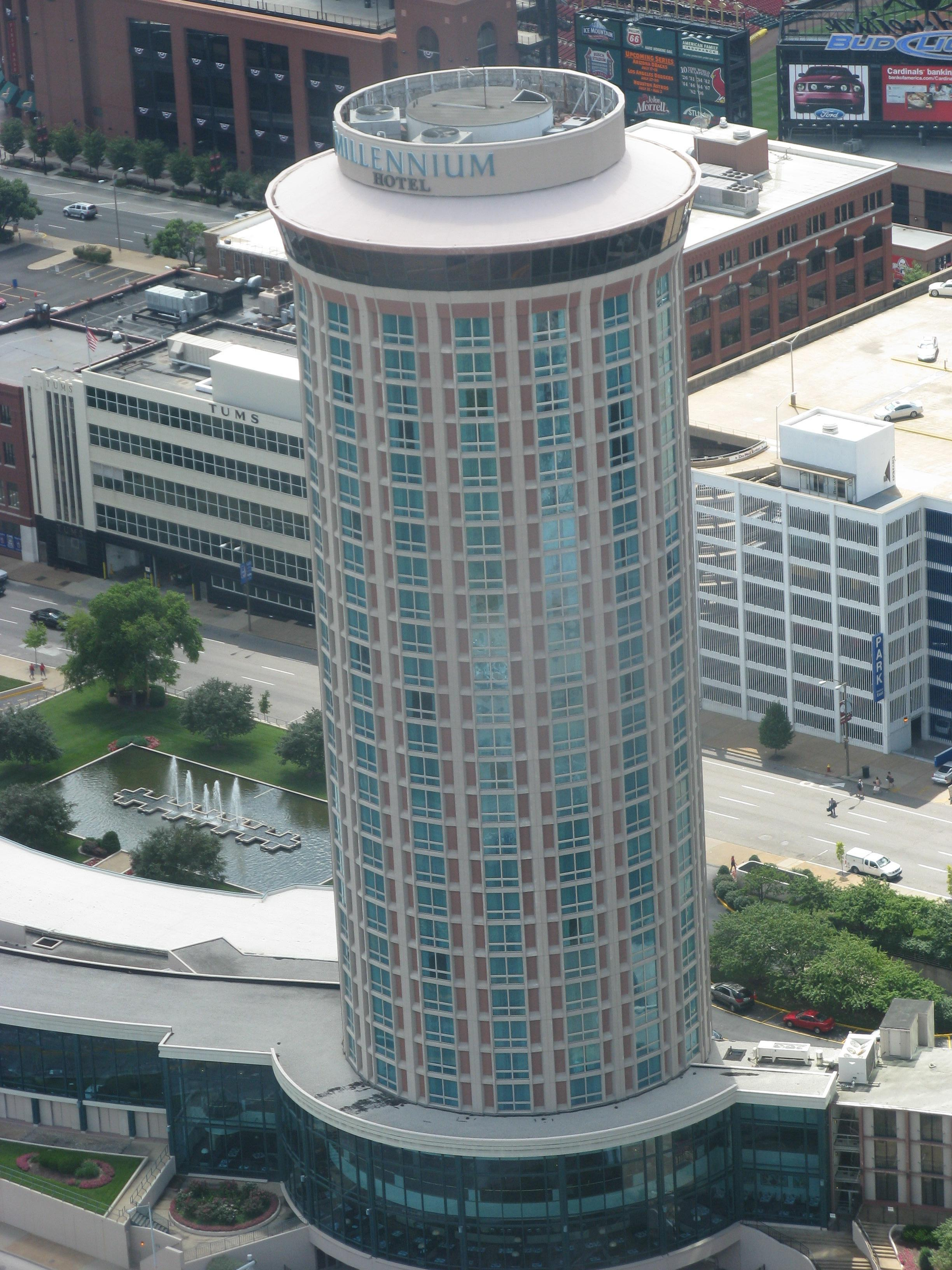
- Tower I of the Millennium Hotel complex as seen from the observation deck of the Gateway Arch.

General information
- Status: Under demolition
- Type: Hotel
- Location: 200 South 4th St., St. Louis, Missouri
- Coordinates: 38.6232°N 90.1889°W
- Completed: 1968; 58 years ago
- Closed: 2014; 12 years ago

Height
- Roof: 290 feet (88 m)

Technical details
- Floor count: 28

Millennium Hotel Tower II

General information
- Status: Demolished
- Type: Hotel
- Location: 310 South 4th St., St. Louis, Missouri
- Coordinates: 38.6221°N 90.1895°W
- Completed: 1974; 52 years ago
- Demolished: 2026

Technical details
- Floor count: 11

The Millennium Hotel St. Louis, more commonly known simply as the Millennium Hotel, was a hotel complex in downtown St. Louis, Missouri, United States, that closed in 2014. The lower complex consisted of a plaza and several recreational facilities. Two towers, Millennium Hotel Tower I and Millennium Hotel Tower II, made up the hotel space. The 28-story Tower I was constructed in 1968, and the 11-story Tower II was constructed in 1974. The complex was adjacent to the Gateway Arch and had 780 rooms and 19 suites. It also featured a revolving restaurant called "Top of the Riverfront" on the 28th floor of Tower I.

== History ==
The Millennium Hotel was originally known as Stouffer's Riverfront Inn and later as the Regal Riverfront Hotel until it was acquired by Millennium Hotels and Resorts in 1999. For many years it was also known as the Clarion. It was designed by Tiernan Design and built by William B. Tabler Architects. Prior to closing the hotel's general manager was Robert Rivers. It closed in January 2014. After its closure, the hotel fell in a state of disrepair for a decade.

=== Redevelopment ===
In September 2024, the Gateway Arch Park Foundation announced that it was under contract to buy the property. The foundation planned to work with the City of St. Louis, the St. Louis Development Corporation, and Greater St. Louis Inc. to redevelop the property. The next month, the city’s planning commission voted unanimously to approve the redevelopment.

On February 25, 2025, the City's Land Clearance for Redevelopment Authority announced that Baltimore-based Cordish Companies, who developed the PricewaterhouseCoopers Pennant Building in nearby Ballpark Village, had been selected for a $670 million redevelopment project of the former hotel site. The two towers will be torn down and replaced by a 1.3-million-square-foot (120,000 m^{2}) mixed-use development with 585 apartments and commercial space. There would also be an amphitheater, food hall, and improved streetscape. In July 2025, the Gateway Arch Park Foundation finalized its purchase of the hotel.

Demolition of the hotel complex began on November 13, 2025. Demolition of the south tower had been completed by April 2026, at which point the north tower's demolition was expected to begin the next month. By May 2026, the north tower was being razed as well.
