= Marriott St. Louis Grand Hotel =

- Hotel Statler
- U.S. National Register of Historic Places
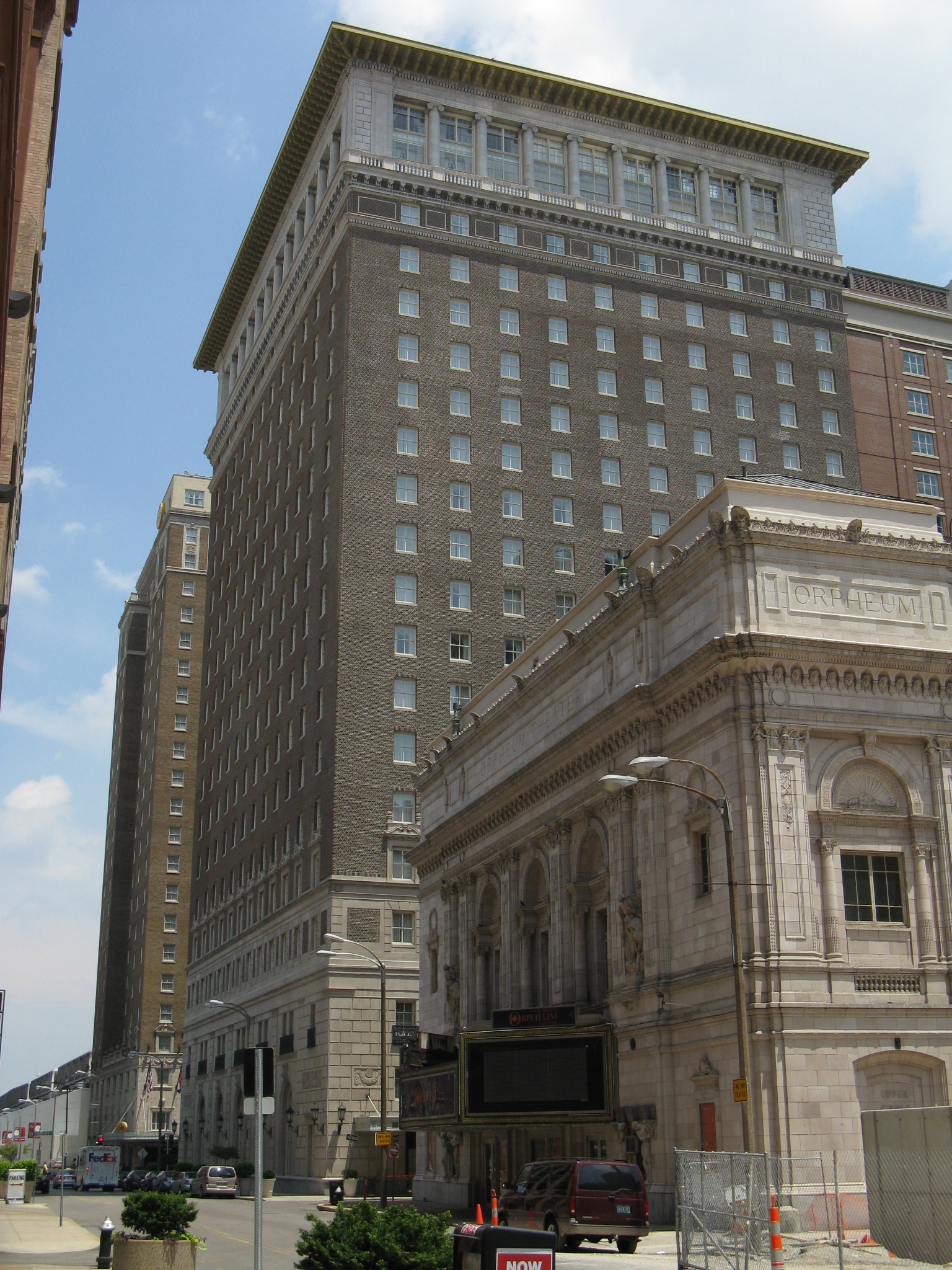
- 1917 tower of the hotel

- Location within St. Louis Location within Missouri Location within the United States
- Location: 800 Washington Ave., St. Louis, Missouri
- Coordinates: 38°37′49″N 90°11′34″W
- Built: 1917
- Architect: Post, George W.,& Sons
- NRHP reference No.: 82004729
- Added to NRHP: March 19, 1982

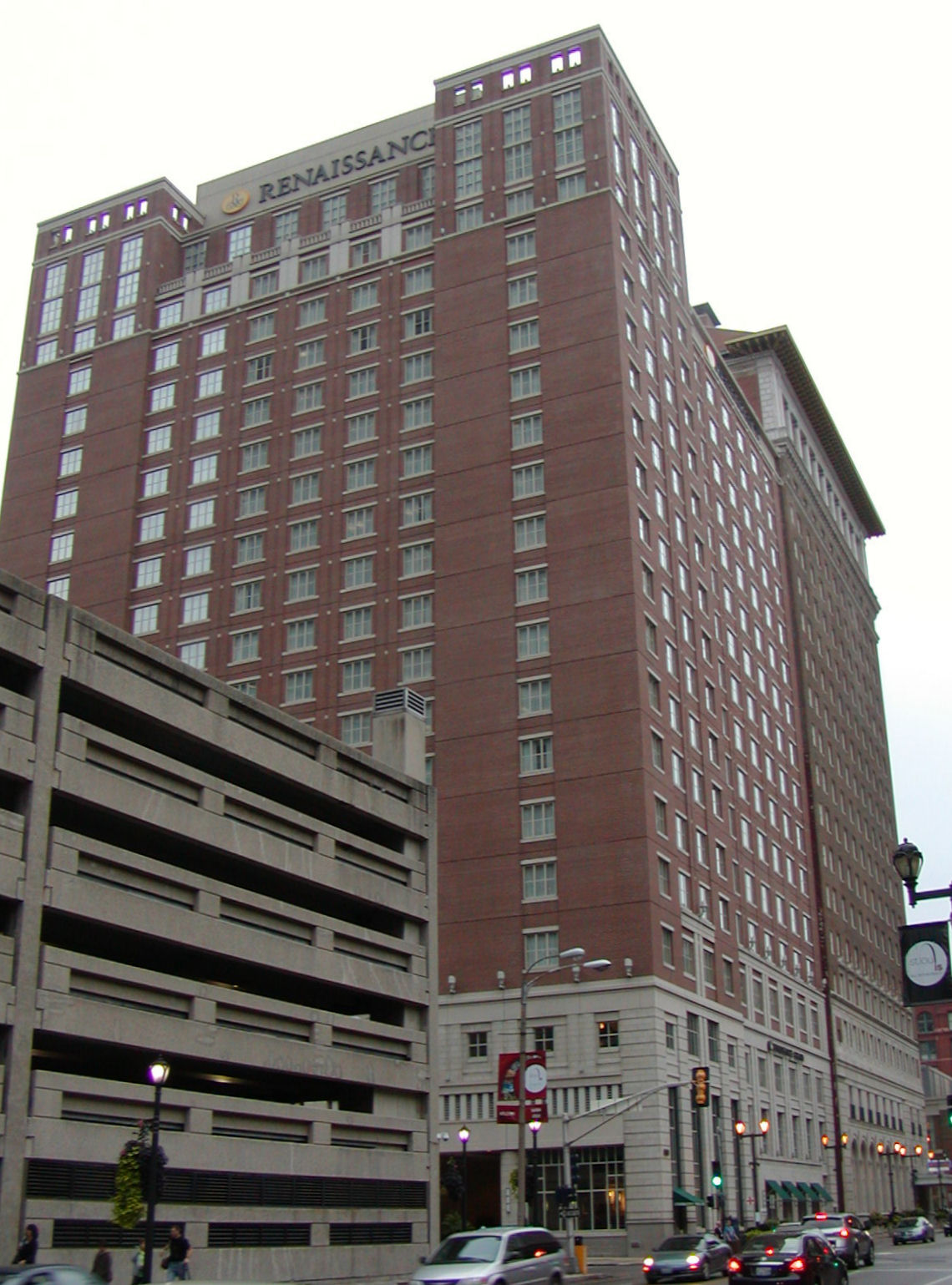
The new addition, with the original building behind it

The Marriott St. Louis Grand Hotel is a hotel located in the Washington Avenue Historic District in Downtown St. Louis, Missouri. The hotel was renovated in 2015.

== History ==
The Hotel Statler St. Louis was designed by George B. Post & Sons and was built in 1917 as part of the Statler Hotels chain. It was the first air-conditioned hotel in the United States. Statler Hotels was bought by Hilton in 1954, and the hotel became The Statler Hilton in 1958. It was sold to Towne Realty Company of Milwaukee in 1966 and renamed The St. Louis Gateway Hotel. The hotel was sold to Denver businessman Victor Sayyah and St. Louis politician Peter J. Webbe in 1981 for $3.2 million. It was added to the National Register of Historic Places in 1982. The hotel closed for a renovation in 1986, but caught fire on February 12, 1987 and never reopened. The fire was determined to have been deliberately set.

The hotel sat empty for over a decade, until the city government pushed for its renovation as part of a 1000-room hotel to serve the adjacent America's Center. Cleanup work began on the hotel in November 1999 at a cost of $5 million. The hotel was then renovated from 2000 to 2002 by Kimberly-Clark and Historic Restoration Inc. at a cost of $265 million. At this time, a new addition was constructed to the east. It was originally to have had 38 floors but was eventually reduced to match the height of the existing hotel. The hotel was renamed the Renaissance St. Louis Grand Hotel.

The hotel was foreclosed on by its bondholders in 2009, after it failed to generate enough revenue to cover interest payments. The hotel was sold in 2014 to Haberhill Inc. and was renovated from November 2014 to August 2015 at a cost of $30 million. At the completion of the work, it was renamed the Marriott St. Louis Grand Hotel.
