= Railway Exchange Building (St. Louis) =

Building in St. Louis, Missouri, US

- U.S. National Register of Historic Places
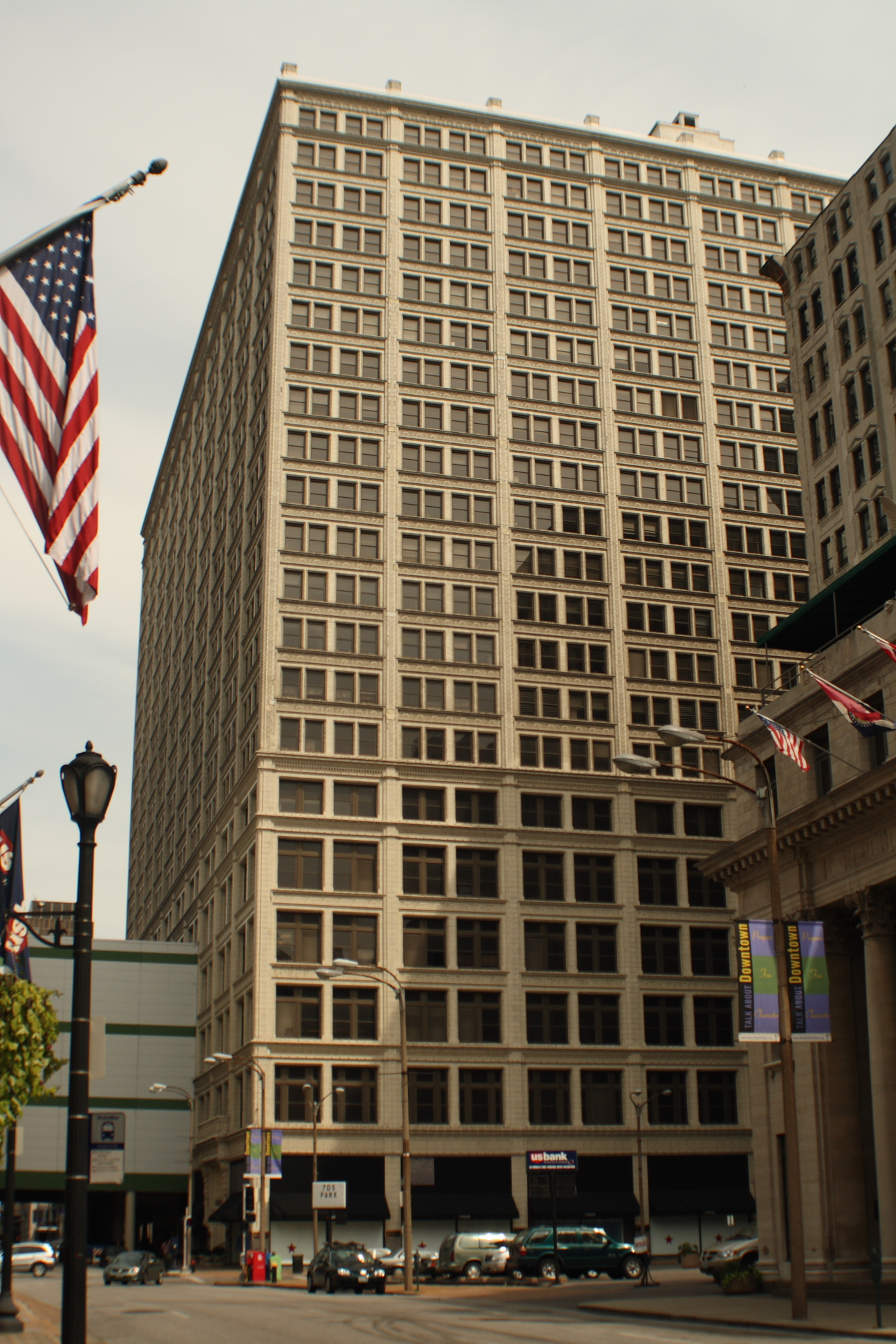
- Railway Exchange Building From Locust Street

- Location within St. Louis Location within Missouri Location within the United States
- Location: 600 Locust St., St. Louis, Missouri
- Coordinates: 38°37′50″N 90°11′22″W
- Area: less than one acre
- Built: 1913
- Built by: Korte Co.
- Architect: Mauran, Russell & Crowell
- Architectural style: Early Commercial
- NRHP reference No.: 09000411
- Added to NRHP: June 11, 2009

The Railway Exchange Building is an 84.4 m (277 ft), 21-story high-rise office building in St. Louis, Missouri. The 1914 steel-frame building is in the Chicago school architectural style, and was designed by architect Mauran, Russell & Crowell. The building was the city's tallest when it opened, and remains the second-largest building in downtown St. Louis by interior area, with almost 1,200,000 square feet (110,000 m^{2}) of space.

The building was long home to the flagship store of the Famous-Barr chain of department stores — and the headquarters of its parent company May Department Stores — until Macy's purchased the brand; the store was rebranded as Macy's in 2006. Macy's sold the building in 2008 and closed the store in 2013. The building has been vacant since the store closed.

In January 2017, Hudson Holdings, a National Historic Property Developer based in Delray Beach, Florida, purchased the building for $20 million.

The city of St. Louis was granted an emergency condemnation on 4 Jan 2023, and proceeded to kick out people who appeared to be squatting and board up the building.

== Notable people ==
- Marie Moentmann (1900-1974), worked at information desk.

== See also ==
- National Register of Historic Places in Downtown and Downtown West St. Louis
