= Business career of Mitt Romney =

Career of US politician

The business career of Mitt Romney began shortly after he finished graduate school in 1975. At that time, Romney entered the management consulting industry, and in 1977 secured a position at Bain & Company. Later serving as its chief executive officer, he helped bring the company out of financial crisis. In 1984, he co-founded and led the spin-off Bain Capital, a private equity investment firm that became highly profitable and one of the largest such firms in the nation. The fortune he earned from his business career is estimated at $190–250 million.

== Entry into management consulting at Boston Consulting Group: 1975–1977 ==
Logo of Boston Consulting Group

After he received a joint Juris Doctor and Master of Business Administration from Harvard University in 1975, Mitt Romney was recruited by several firms and chose to remain in Massachusetts to work for Boston Consulting Group (BCG), reasoning that working as a management consultant to a variety of companies would better prepare him for a future position as a chief executive. He was part of a 1970s wave of top graduates who chose to go into consulting rather than join a major company directly.

Romney's legal and business education proved useful in his job, where he applied BCG principles such as the growth-share matrix to assist large corporations in deciding how to allocate cash among their business units. Romney worked nights and weekends, and traveled frequently in the U.S. and to Europe on business.

== Management consulting at Bain & Company: 1977–1984 ==
Logo of Bain & Company

In 1977, he was hired by Bain & Company, a management consulting firm in Boston that had been formed a few years earlier by Bill Bain and other former BCG employees. Bain would later say of the thirty-year-old Romney, "He had the appearance of confidence of a guy who was maybe ten years older." Unlike other consulting firms, which issued recommendations and then left, Bain & Company had a practice, that Romney learned, of immersing itself in a client's business and working with them until changes were implemented.

Geoffrey Rehnert, who also worked at Bain & Company, recalls that those who gravitated to Bain were mostly not from wealthy backgrounds. The company operated as a results-oriented meritocracy, and Romney excelled there. He became a vice-president of the firm in 1978, and worked with clients such as the Monsanto Company, Outboard Marine Corporation, Burlington Industries, and Corning Incorporated. Within a few years, he was considered one of their best consultants and at times sought by clients over more senior partners.

Romney aspired to start a new business, and in 1983, Bill Bain offered him the chance to head a new venture that would buy into companies, have them benefit from Bain consulting techniques, and allow the venture's partners to reap higher rewards than consulting fees. He initially refrained from accepting the offer, and Bain re-arranged the terms in a complicated partnership structure so that there was no financial or professional risk to Romney. Thus, in 1984, Romney left Bain & Company to co-found the spin-off private equity investment firm, Bain Capital.

== Private equity at Bain Capital: 1984–1990 ==
Logo of Bain Capital

Bain Capital was founded in 1984 by Bain & Company partners Mitt Romney, T. Coleman Andrews III, and Eric Kriss. In addition to the three founding partners, the early team included Geoffrey S. Rehnert and others from Bain & Company.

Romney initially had the titles of president and managing general partner (or managing partner). He later was referred to as managing director or CEO as well. He was also the sole shareholder of the firm. At the beginning, the firm had fewer than ten employees. When new employees were hired, they were generally in their twenties and top-ranked graduates from Stanford University or Harvard University, both of which Romney had attended.

In the face of skepticism from potential investors, Romney and his partners spent a year raising the $37 million in funds needed to start the new operation. Early investors also included members of elite Salvadoran families who fled the country's civil war. They and other wealthy Latin Americans invested $9 million primarily through offshore companies registered in Panama.

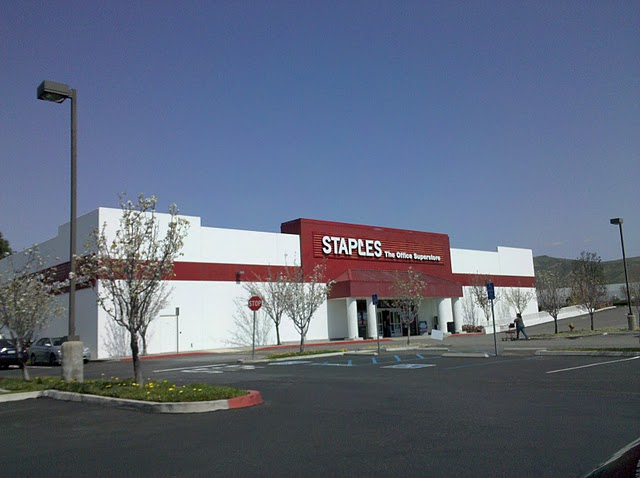
Staples store in Yorba Linda, CA

While Bain Capital was founded by Bain executives, the firm was not an affiliate or a division of Bain & Company but rather a completely separate company. Initially, the two firms shared the same offices – in an office tower at Copley Place in Boston – and a similar approach to improving business operations. However, the two firms had put in place certain protections to avoid sharing information between the two companies and the Bain & Company executives had the ability to veto investments that posed potential conflicts of interest. Bain Capital also provided an investment opportunity for partners of Bain & Company. Bain Capital's original $37 million fund was raised entirely from private individuals in mid-1984. The firm initially gave a cut of its profits to Bain & Company, but Romney later persuaded Bill Bain to give that up.

The Bain Capital team was initially reluctant to invest its capital. By 1985, things were going poorly enough that Romney considered closing the operation, returning investors' money back to them, and having the partners go back to their old positions. The partners saw weak spots in so many potential deals that by 1986, very few had been done. At first, Bain Capital focused on venture capital opportunities. One of Bain's earliest and most notable venture investments was in Staples, Inc., the office supply retailer. In 1986, Bain provided $4.5 million to two supermarket executives, Leo Kahn and Thomas G. Stemberg, to open an office supply supermarket in Brighton, Massachusetts. The fast-growing retail chain went public in 1989; by 1996, the company had grown to over 1,100 stores, and by 2008, over 2,000 stores. Bain Capital eventually reaped a nearly sevenfold return on its investment, and Romney sat on the Staples board of directors for over a decade. Another very successful investment occurred in 1986 when $1 million was invested in medical equipment maker Calumet Coach, which eventually returned $34 million. A few years later, Bain Capital made an investment in the technology research outfit the Gartner Group, which ended up returning a 16-fold gain.

Bain invested the $37 million of capital in its first fund in twenty companies and by 1989 was generating an annualized return in excess of 50 percent. By the end of the decade, Bain's second fund, raised in 1987 had deployed $106 million into 13 investments. As the firm began organizing around funds, each such fund was run by a specific general partnership – that included all Bain Capital executives as well as others – which in turn was controlled by Bain Capital Inc., the management company that Romney had full ownership control of. As CEO, Romney had the final approval say on every deal made.

In 1987, former Herman's World of Sporting Goods CEO Jack Smith made a pitch to Romney, and Bain joined several other backers to help Smith open nine sporting-goods mega stores. Kmart bought the Sports Authority chain for $75 million.

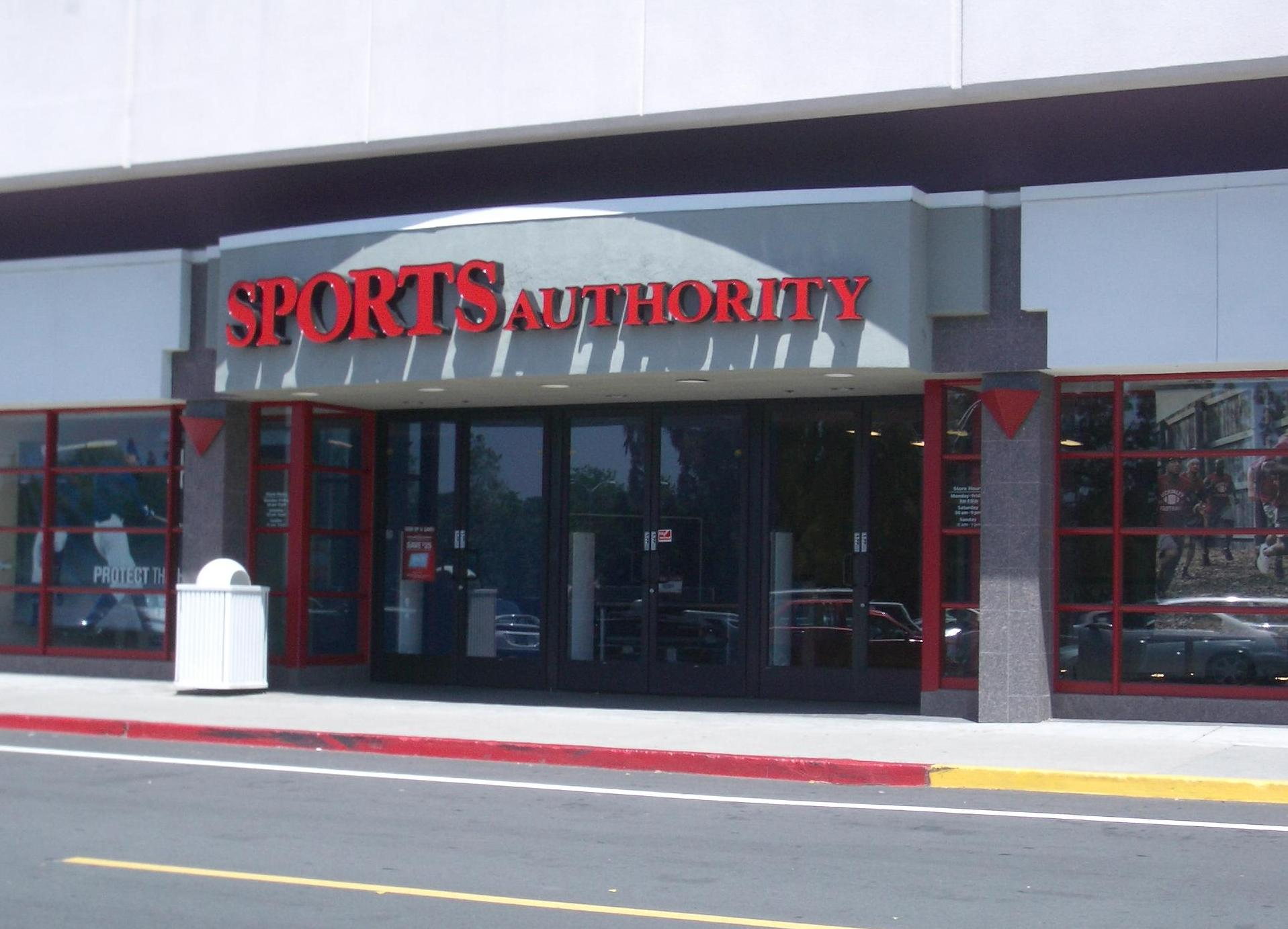
Sports Authority store in Concord, CA

Romney discovered few investment opportunities himself (and those that he did, often failed to make money for the firm). Instead, he focused on analyzing the merits of possible deals that others brought forward and on recruiting investors to participate in them once approved. The firm initially gave a cut of its profits to Bain & Company, but Romney persuaded Bain to give that up. Within Bain Capital, Romney spread profits from deals widely within the firm to keep people motivated, often keeping less than ten percent for himself. Viewed as a fair manager, he received considerable loyalty from the firm's members.

Romney's wary instincts were still in force at times, and he was generally data-driven and averse to risk.

He wanted to drop a Bain Capital hedge fund that initially lost money, but other partners prevailed and it eventually gained billions. Romney was on the board of directors of Damon Corporation, a medical testing company later found guilty of defrauding the government; Bain Capital tripled its investment before selling off the company, and the fraud was discovered by the new owners (Romney was never implicated). In some cases, Romney had little involvement with a company once acquired. Beginning in 1989, the firm, which began as a venture capital source investing in start-up companies, adjusted its strategy to focus on leveraged buyouts and growth capital investments in more mature companies. Their model was to buy existing firms with money mostly borrowed against their assets, partner with existing management to apply Bain methodology to their operations (rather than the hostile takeovers practiced in other leverage buyout scenarios), and sell them off in a few years. Existing CEOs were offered large equity stakes in the process, owing to Bain Capital's belief in the emerging agency theory that CEOs should be bound to maximizing shareholder value rather than other goals. By the end of 1990, Bain had raised $175 million of capital and financed 35 companies with combined revenues of $3.5 billion.

== Temporary return to Bain & Company: 1991–1992 ==
In 1990, Romney was asked to return to Bain & Company, which was facing financial collapse. He was announced as its new CEO in January 1991 but drew only a symbolic salary of one dollar (he remained managing general partner of Bain Capital during this time). His turnaround of Bain & Company has been identified as a primary example of Romney's turnaround talents from the business world, and Romney says there was no upside for him personally: "There was no particular reason to do it other than a sense of obligation and duty to an organization that had done great things for me and which employed a thousand people." However, once Romney took up the challenge, his stake in success became enormous, and his reputation would have been diminished if Bain & Company went bankrupt. He proceeded to apply the "Bain way" to Bain & Company itself.

Bringing along two lieutenants from Bain Capital, Romney began a traveling campaign to rally employees at all Bain offices globally. Romney also negotiated a complex settlement between the Bain partnership and the firm's lenders, including a $10 million reduction in the $38 million Bain owed the Bank of New England, which by that time had been seized by the FDIC and placed in Chapter 7 liquidation. Romney was able to negotiate this reduction in the debt amount with the FDIC by warning that he would use the remaining cash that Bain & Company had on hand as bonuses for Bain executives, starting with VPs making $200,000 and up. This was a costly deal for the FDIC, but Romney's brinksmanship worked, at no expense to taxpayers. Romney's plan involved "a complicated restructuring of the firm's stock-ownership plan, real-estate holdings, bank loans, and money still owed to partners". To avoid the financial crisis that a buyout would have triggered, the group of founding partners agreed to return about $100M cash and forgive outstanding debt.

Romney also imposed a new governing structure that included Bain and the other founding partners giving up control, and increasing fiscal transparency. Within about a year, he had led Bain & Company through a successful turnaround and returned the firm to profitability without further layoffs or partner defections. He turned Bain & Company over to new leadership and returned to Bain Capital in December 1992.

Some of the techniques that Romney employed during this temporary mission at Bain & Company were as follows: at the outset, he demanded unanimous approval from the partners at Bain & Company for his designation as CEO, and also demanded that each partner commit to staying at least a year so as to give the turnaround a fair chance. He limited partner meetings to Saturdays, so that all of the weekdays could be devoted to taking care of client business. Romney reduced the company's physical space, evaluated which partners were producing and which were not, arranged bridge financing, and focused on hiring top talent from top schools, while rescinding prior offers that were not up to standard.

Although in the role for just two years before returning to Bain Capital, Romney's work had three profound impacts on the firm. First, ownership was officially shifted from the owners to the firm's 70 general partners. Second, transparency in the firm's finances increased dramatically (e.g. partners were able to know each other's salaries). Third, Bill Bain relinquished ownership in the firm that carried his name. Within a year, Bain bounced back to profitability without major partner defections, and the groundwork was laid for a period of steady growth.

== Back at Bain Capital for the rest of the 1990s ==
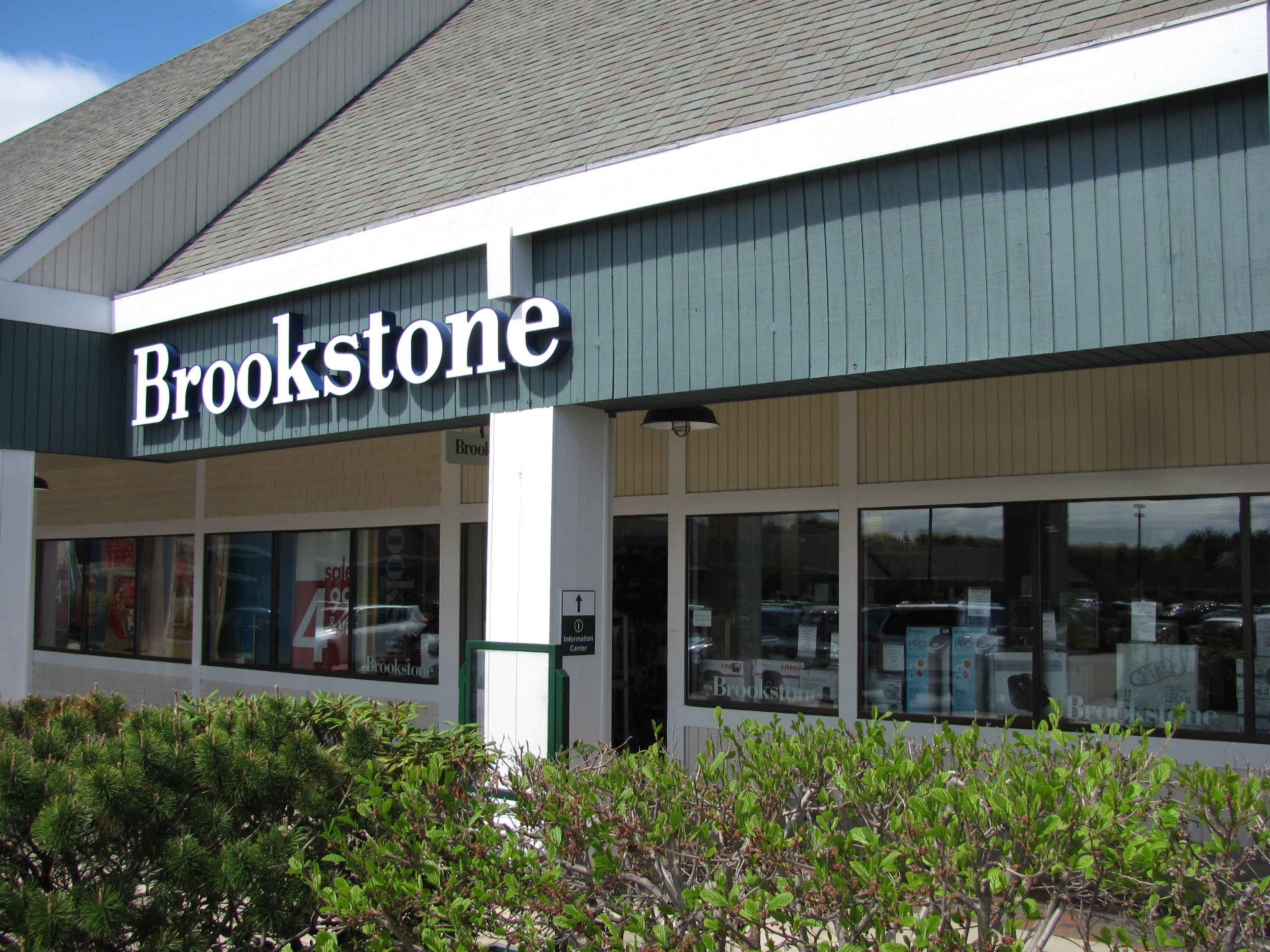
A Brookstone outlet store in Kittery, Maine

After Romney and Bain took over Brookstone in 1991, they replaced Brookstone's CEO in 1993, shifted to more Brookstone-branded items, moved more catalog content onto the company's website in 1996, and, instead of selling gifts began offering more practical items. Brookstone survived while its competitor, Sharper Image, declared bankruptcy.

In July 1992 (while Romney was still rescuing Bain & Company), Bain Capital acquired Ampad from Mead Corporation, which had acquired the company in 1986. Mead, which was experiencing difficulties integrating Ampad's products into its existing product lines, generated a cash gain of $56 million on the sale. Under Bain's ownership, the company enjoyed a significant growth in sales from $106.7 million in 1992 to $583.9 million in 1996, when the company was listed on the New York Stock Exchange. Under Bain's ownership, the company also made a number of acquisitions, including writing products company SCM in July 1994, brand names from the American Trading and Production Corporation in August 1995, WR Acquisition and the Williamhouse-Regency Division of Delaware, Inc. in October, 1995, Niagara Envelope Company, Inc. in 1996, and Shade/Allied, Inc. in February 1997. Ampad's revenue began to decline in 1997 and the company laid off employees and closed production facilities to maintain profitability. The Ampad transaction is one of Romney's few regrets from his Bain years.

In 1994, Bain Capital acquired Totes, a producer of umbrellas and overshoes. Three years later, Totes, under Bain's ownership, acquired Isotoner, a producer of leather gloves. Totes Isotoner is now the largest supplier of umbrellas in the world.

Bain Capital, together with Thomas H. Lee Partners, acquired Experian, the consumer credit reporting business of TRW, in 1996 for more than $1 billion. Formerly known as TRW's Information Systems and Services unit, Experian is one of the leading providers of credit reports on consumers and businesses in the US. The company was sold to Great Universal Stores for $1.7 billion just months after being acquired.

Other notable Bain investments of the late 1990s included Sealy Corporation (the manufacturer of mattresses), Alliance Laundry Systems, Domino's Pizza, and Artisan Entertainment. The Sealy and Domino's Pizza investments have been ranked by TheStreet.com as two of the five Romney-era investments by Bain Capital that had the biggest impact on American consumers; the other three were Staples and Sports Authority in the 1980s, and Brookstone in 1991. In 1997, when Bain invested in Sealy, the company already had a 23% share of the $4 billion mattress market, and Bain decided to make all parts of the mattress in a constant flow instead of in batches (thereby producing only the amount ordered by consumers and consequently reducing inventory), while redesigning the core mattress; Sealy's earnings increased by half in three years. Bain bought 93% of Domino's in 1998, and installed personnel who substantially boosted profits. As for Bain's purchase of film studio Artisan Entertainment in the late 1990s, Romney refused to get personally involved with it, because of its R-rated films.

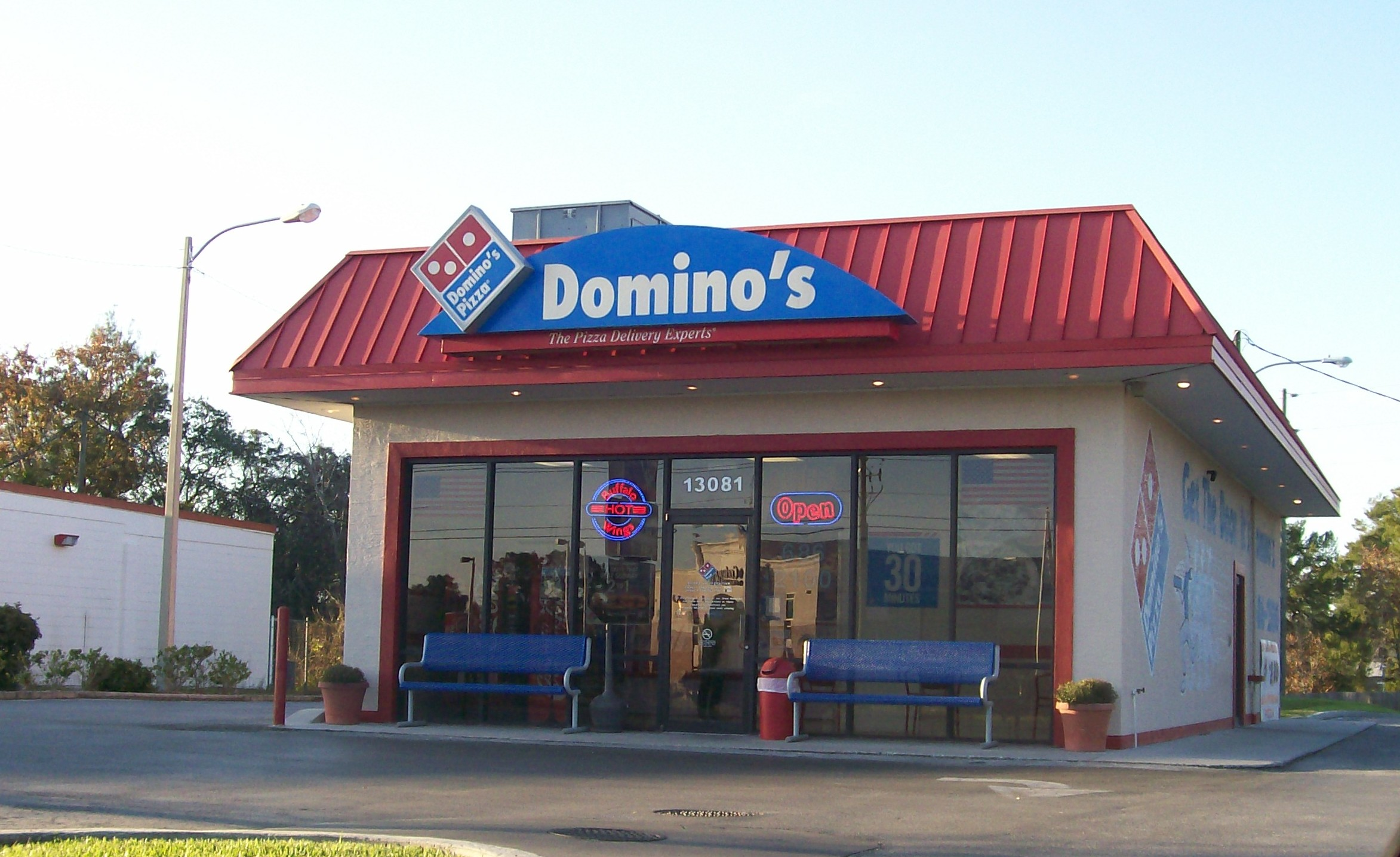
The exterior of a Domino's Pizza store in Spring Hill, Florida.

Much of the firm's profits were earned from a relatively small number of deals, with Bain Capital's overall success and failure rate being about even. One study of 68 deals that Bain Capital made up through the 1990s found that the firm lost money or broke even on 33 of them. Another study that looked at the eight-year period following 77 deals during the same time found that in 17 cases the company went bankrupt or out of business, and in 6 cases Bain Capital lost all its investment. But 10 deals were very successful and represented 70 percent of the total profits. Bain Capital has publicly asserted that 80% of their 350 companies and 100 start-up investments grew as a result of Bain investments.

Romney took a leave of absence from Bain Capital from November 1993 to November 1994 in order to run for the U.S. Senate. During that time, Ampad workers went on strike, and asked Romney to intervene; Bain Capital lawyers asked him not to get involved, although he did meet with the workers to tell them he had no position of active authority in the matter.

Romney returned to Bain Capital the day after the 1994 election, but the loss had a lasting effect; he told his brother, "I never want to run for something again unless I can win." When his father died in 1995, Mitt donated his inheritance to BYU's George W. Romney Institute of Public Management. He also joined the board, as vice-chair, of the Points of Light Foundation, which had incorporated his father's National Volunteer Center.

In 1994, Bain invested in Steel Dynamics, based in Fort Wayne, Indiana, a prosperous steel company that has grown to the fifth largest in the US, employs about 6,100 people, and produces carbon steel products with 2010 revenues of $6.3 billion on steel shipments of 5.3 million tons. In 1993, Bain acquired the Armco Worldwide Grinding System steel plant in Kansas City, Missouri and merged it with its steel plant in Georgetown, South Carolina to form GST Steel. The Kansas City plant had a strike in 1997.

Bain's investment in Dade Behring represented a significant investment in the medical diagnostics industry. In 1994, Bain, together with Goldman Sachs Alternatives completed a carveout acquisition of Dade International, the medical diagnostics division of Baxter International in a $440 million acquisition. Dade's private equity owners merged the company with DuPont's in vitro diagnostics business in May 1996 and subsequently with the Behring Diagnostics division of Hoechst AG in 1997. Aventis, the successor of Hoechst, acquired 52% of the combined company. In 1999, the company reported $1.3 billion of revenue and completed a $1.25 billion leveraged recapitalization that resulted in a payout to shareholders. The dividend, taken together with other previous shareholder dividends resulted in an eightfold return on investment to Bain Capital and Goldman Sachs.

In July 1996, when partner Bob Gray's teenage daughter went missing in New York City, Romney shut down the Boston office and sent 56 employees to search for her, also setting up a toll-free tip line, and hiring private investigators. The search took Romney into contact with runaways on the seediest streets of New York, and a traced telephone call helped to locate the daughter, who had travelled to New Jersey for a concert without telling her parents.

In 1998, an affiliate of Bain Capital called Brookside Capital Partners Fund bought about 6 percent of Global Tech, a Chinese appliance-maker. Romney was the sole shareholder, sole director, president and chief executive officer of Brookside. The Obama campaign asserts that Romney profited from and indirectly supported "sweatshop conditions" at Global Tech, although independent fact-checkers say there is no evidence Romney actively sent any American jobs to China or approved the specific investment in Global Tech.

By the end of the decade, Bain Capital was on its way to being one of the top private equity firms in the nation, having increased its number of partners from 5 to 18, having 115 employees overall, and having $4 billion under its management. The firm's average annual return on investments was 113 percent. It had made between 100 and 150 deals where it acquired and then sold a company. Bain Capital's approach of applying consulting expertise to the companies it invested in became widely copied within the private equity industry.

Economist Steven Kaplan of the University of Chicago would later say, "[Romney] came up with a model that was very successful and very innovative and that now everybody uses." Kaplan argues that, "Bain Capital and Romney delivered spectacularly well for their customers, better than other [private equity] firms that on average outperformed the public markets. Today, those customers include the California State Teachers’ Retirement System and the Teacher Retirement System of Texas."

In contrast to economist Kaplan, the author and polemicist Matt Taibbi of Rolling Stone Magazine paints a less favorable portrait of Romney's business career (Taibbi also disparages Romney as “self-righteously anal, thin-lipped, [and] Whitest Kids U Know”). According to Taibbi, toward the middle of his career at Bain Capital, Romney moved away from helping startups, and moved toward leveraged buyouts which involved borrowing money to take over established companies in order to extract as much value as possible from those targeted companies. Taibbi calls this “financial piracy”, while acknowledging that Romney's leveraged buyouts were not hostile takeovers, and also conceding that some of Bain's work was not "evil" (such as Bain's successful turnaround of Experian). Taibbi blames the U.S. tax code for making leveraged buyouts possible by allowing companies like Bain to deduct interest on debt they use to acquire targets, and also by allowing individuals like Romney to pay much less than the ordinary tax rate on income. However, The Wall Street Journal reports that Romney likely did not participate in the latter tax rate reductions.

Romney primarily made his fortune at Bain Capital from 1984 to 1999, a fortune estimated to be worth between $190 million to $250 million.

== Departure from business career: 1999–2002 ==
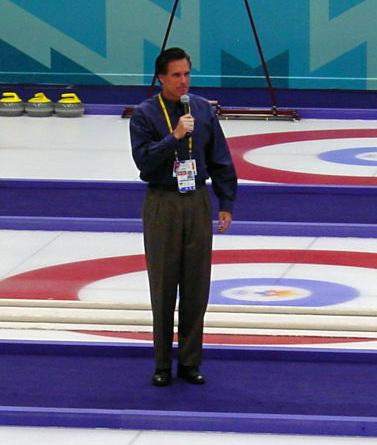
Romney left his business career to run the 2002 Winter Olympics.

As the decade neared a close, the goal of simply making more money was losing its appeal for Romney. He took a paid leave of absence from Bain Capital in February 1999 when he became the head of the Salt Lake Organizing Committee for the 2002 Winter Olympics. The decision caused turmoil at Bain Capital, with a power struggle ensuing. Some partners left and founded the Audax Group and Golden Gate Capital. Other partners threatened to leave, and there was a prospect of eight-figure lawsuits being filed. Romney was worried that the firm might be destroyed, but the crisis ebbed.

Billed in some public statements as keeping a part-time role, Romney remained the firm's sole shareholder, managing director, CEO and president, signing corporate and legal documents, attending to his interests within the firm, and conducting prolonged negotiations for the terms of his departure.

Romney was not involved in day-to-day operations of the firm after starting the Olympics position. Those were handled by a management committee, consisting of five of the fourteen remaining active partners with the firm. However, according to some interviews and press releases during 1999, Romney said he was keeping a part-time function at Bain.

During his leave of absence, Romney continued to be listed in filings to the U.S. Securities and Exchange Commission as "sole shareholder, sole director, Chief Executive Officer and President". The SEC filings reflected the legal reality and the ownership interest in the Bain Capital management company. In practice, former Bain partners have stated that Romney's attention was mostly occupied by his Olympics position. He did stay in regular contact with his partners, and traveled to meet with them several times, signing corporate and legal documents and paying attention to his own interests within the firm and to his departure negotiations. Bain Capital Fund VI in 1998 was the last one Romney was involved in; investors were worried that with Romney gone, the firm would have trouble raising money for Bain Capital Fund VII in 2000, but in practice the $2.5 billion was raised without much trouble. His former partners have said that Romney had no role in assessing other new investments after February 1999, nor was he involved in directing the company's investment funds. Discussions over the final terms of Romney's departure dragged on during this time, with Romney negotiating for the best deal he could get and his continuing position as CEO and sole shareholder giving him the leverage to do so.

Although he had left open the possibility of returning to Bain after the Olympics, Romney made his crossover to politics permanent with an announcement in August 2001. His separation from the firm was finalized in early 2002. Romney negotiated a ten-year retirement agreement with Bain Capital that allowed him to receive a passive profit share and interest as a retired partner in some Bain Capital entities, including buyout and Bain Capital investment funds, in exchange for his ownership in the management company. Because the private equity business continued to thrive, this deal would bring him millions of dollars in annual income. Romney was the first and last CEO of Bain Capital; since his departure became final, it has continued to be run by management committee.

Romney's business career has drawn both praise and criticism from his political opponents. Summarizing his business career and the creative destruction of the private equity industry, he has said: "Sometimes the medicine is a little bitter but it is necessary to save the life of the patient. My job was to try to make the enterprise successful, and in my view the best security a family can have is that the business they work for is strong." Romney's web site defends his business career.

== Personal wealth generated by business career ==
As a result of his career in business, Romney and his wife amassed a net worth in the hundreds of millions of dollars; their wealth remained in the range of a fifth to a quarter billion dollars as of 2011. Most of it has been held in blind trusts since 2003. An additional blind trust, valued at $100 million in 2012, exists in the name of the Romneys' children. The trust, created in 1995, allows the Romneys to transfer money to heirs outside their estate, taking advantage of sophisticated tax planning techniques used by high-net-worth families in an effort to defer or reduce their tax burden. Romney has an SEP-IRA worth between $21 million and $102 million. A portion of Romney's financial assets are held in offshore accounts and investments.

In 2010, Romney and his wife received $21.7 million in income, almost all of it from investments such as dividends, capital gains, and carried interest. For 2010, the Romneys paid about $3 million in federal income taxes, for an effective tax rate of 13.9 percent. For the years 1990–2009, his effective rates were at least 13.7 percent with an average effective rate of 20.2 percent.

Romney has regularly tithed to the LDS Church, including stock from Bain Capital holdings. In 2010, he and his wife gave $3 million to charity, including $1.5 million to the church. The Romney family's Tyler Charitable Foundation gave out about $650,000 in that year, some of which went to organizations that fight diseases such as cystic fibrosis and multiple sclerosis. In addition, the Romneys have often donated to LDS Church-owned BYU. For the years 1990–2009, the Romneys' total charitable donations as portions of their income averaged 13.5 percent.
