= 101 South Hanley =

Office building in Clayton, Missouri

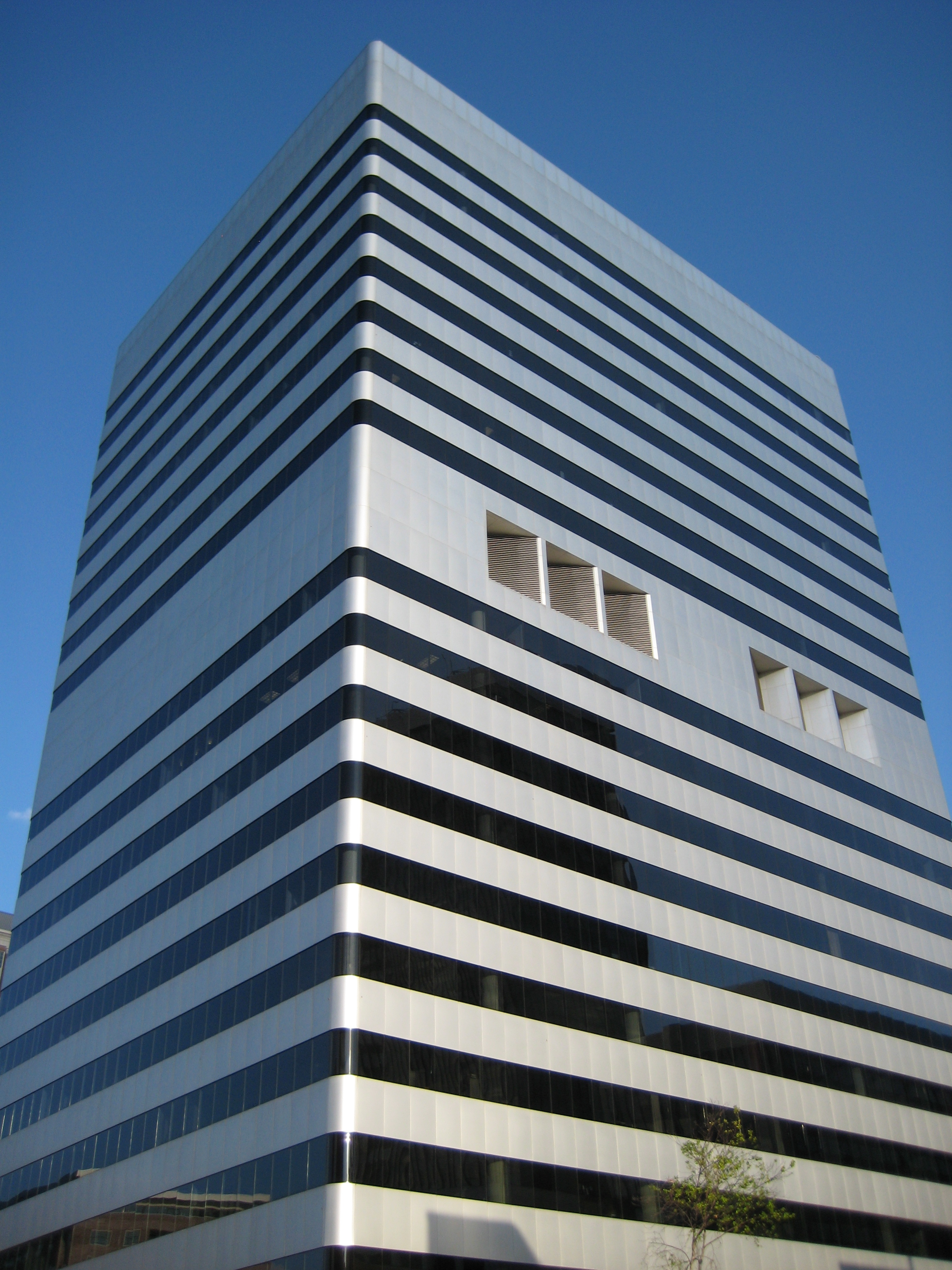
- NW_corner,_101_South_Hanley,_Clayton,_MO 101 South Hanley in 2008

- Location within Missouri Location within the United States

General information
- Status: Completed
- Type: Office
- Architectural style: Modern
- Location: 101 South Hanley Road, Clayton, Missouri, United States
- Coordinates: 38°38′53″N 90°20′05″W
- Completed: 1986

Height
- Roof: 272 ft (83 m)

Technical details
- Floor count: 19

Website
- the101clayton.com/home.axis

101 South Hanley (also known as the Hanley Corporate Tower and Interco Tower) is a 272 ft (83 m) tall modern office building located on 101 South Hanley Road in Downtown Clayton, Missouri. It was built in 1986 and has 19 floors. When it was built it was the 3rd-tallest building in Clayton, as of January 2026 it is the 6th-tallest building in Clayton. Tenants include CoStar, First American Title Insurance Company, and Meridian Land Group.

The building has 360,505 rsquare feet of rentable space.

In 2015, Oculus was selected to lead the redesign and rebrand of the tower by KBS, who bought it in 2014 from Duke Realty for $62.25 million dollars. The enhancements were expected to cost $6.5 million dollars.

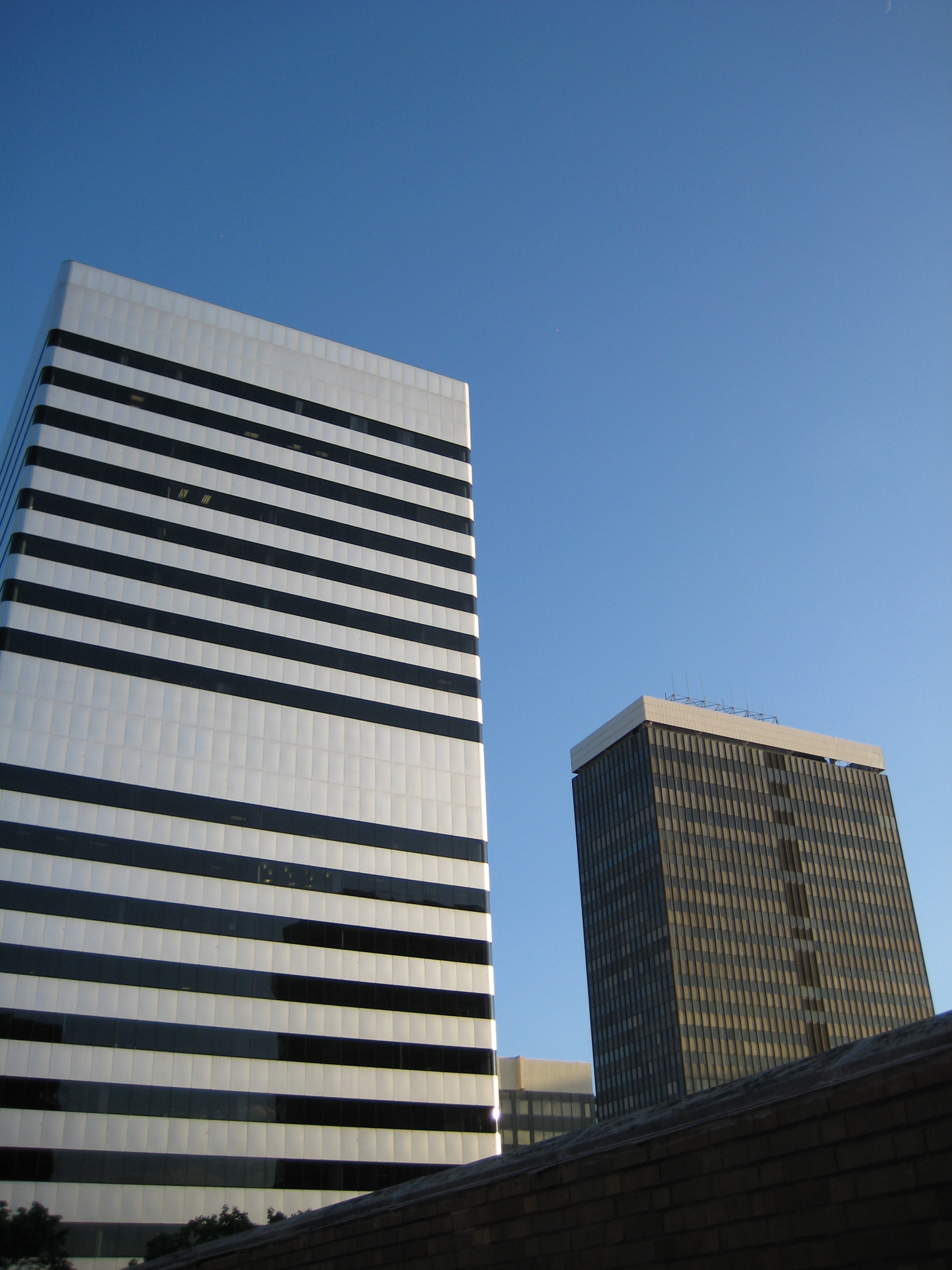
101 South Hanley with The Sevens Building in the background.

== See also ==
- PNC Center (Clayton, Missouri)
- The Sevens Building
- List of tallest buildings in Clayton, Missouri
