= AK Steel =

Defunct steel manufactuer

Coordinates: 39.4969°N 84.3880°W

AK Steel Holdings Corporation
- Type: Public
- Traded as: NYSE: AKS
- Industry: Steel
- Founded: 1899; 127 years ago (as The American Rolling Mill Company - Armco)
- Defunct: March 13, 2020
- Fate: Acquired by Cleveland-Cliffs
- Headquarters: West Chester Township, Ohio, U.S.
- Area served: Worldwide
- Key people: Roger K. Newport (CEO); Kirk W. Reich (president & COO); James A. Thomson (chairman)
- Products: Carbon steel Stainless steel Electrical steel Tubular products
- Production output: 5,596,200 tons
- Revenue: ▲$6.818 billion (2018)
- Operating income: ▲$384 million (2018)
- Net income: ▲$186 million (2018)
- Total assets: ▲$4.515 billion (2018)
- Total equity: ▲$429 million (2018)
- Number of employees: 9,500 (2018)
- Parent: Cleveland-Cliffs
- Subsidiaries: AK Tube; AK Coal

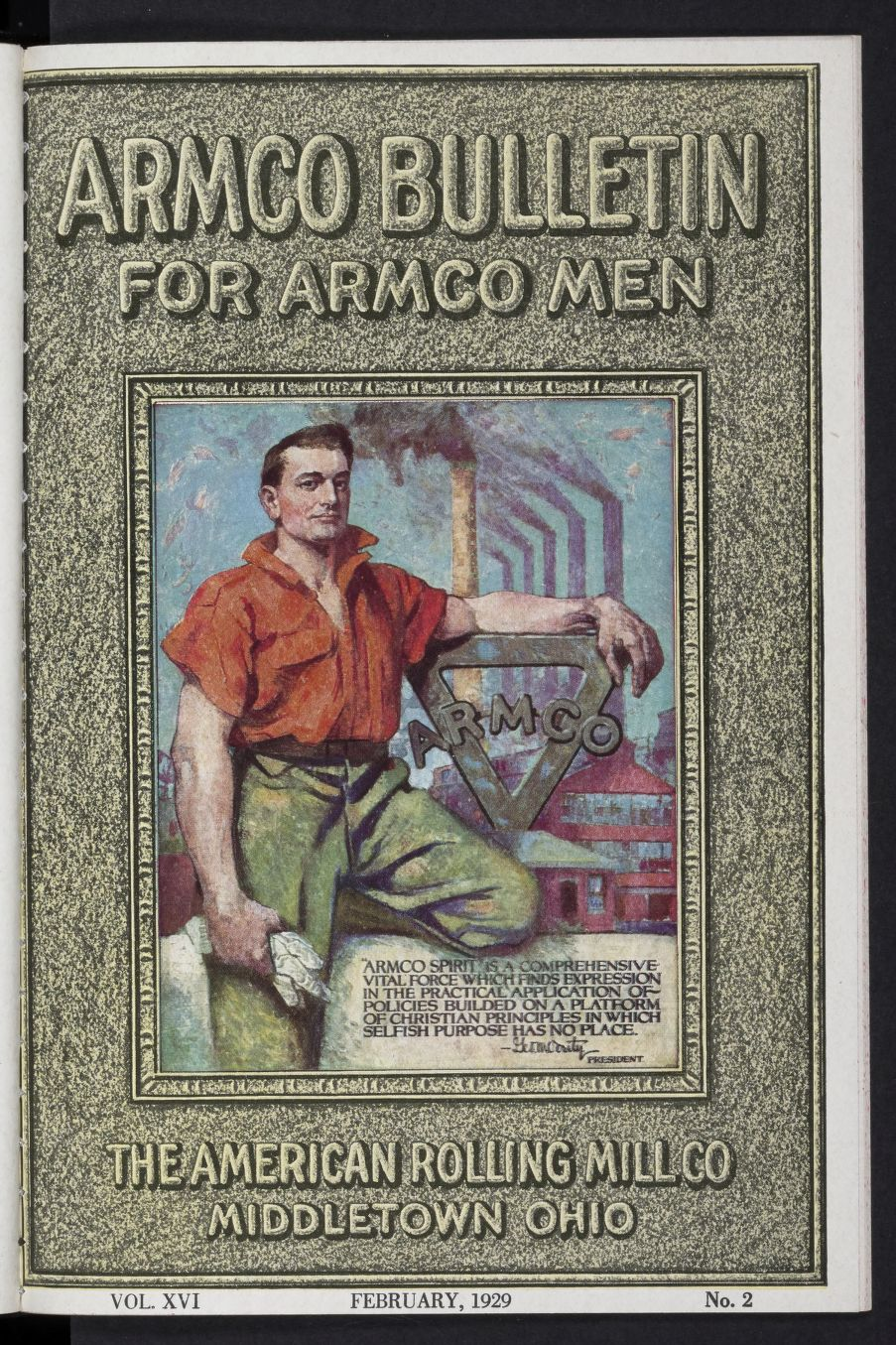
A February 1929 edition of the Armco bulletin

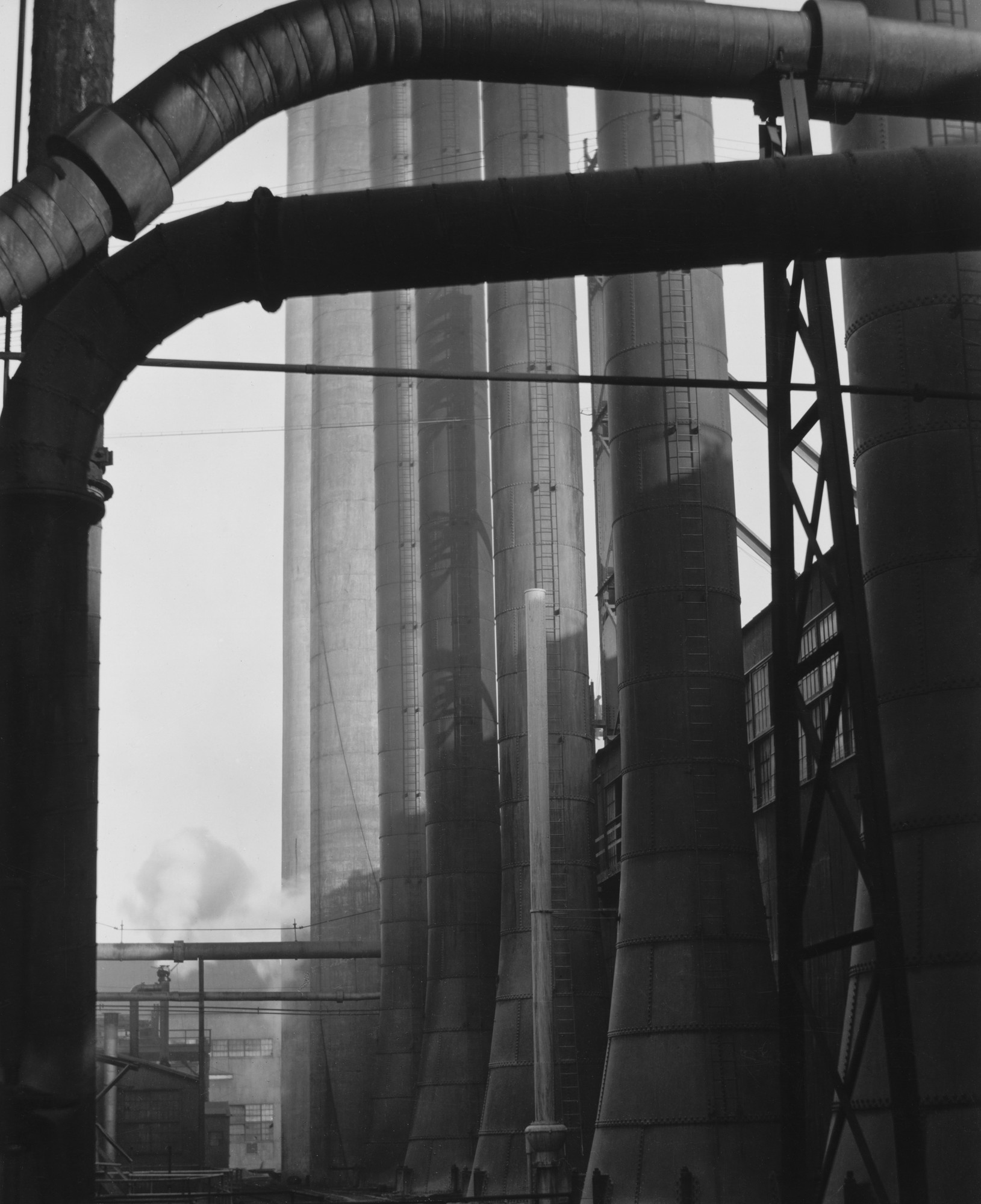
Armco Steel, Ohio, as photographed by Edward Weston

AK Steel Holdings Corporation was an American steelmaking company headquartered in West Chester Township, Ohio. Its name was derived from the initials of Armco, its predecessor company, and Kawasaki Steel Corporation. The company was acquired by Cleveland-Cliffs in March 2020.

AK Steel operated eight steel plants and two tube manufacturing plants in Ashland, Kentucky; Butler, Pennsylvania; Coshocton, Ohio; Dearborn, Michigan; Mansfield, Ohio; Middletown, Ohio; Rockport, Indiana; and Zanesville, Ohio. The company had manufacturing operations in the United States, Canada, and Mexico and facilities in Western Europe. AK Steel produced flat-rolled carbon, stainless, and electrical steel products, primarily for the automotive, infrastructure and manufacturing sectors, including electrical power, and distributors and converters markets. The company also provided carbon and stainless steel tubing products, die design and tooling, and hot- and cold-stamped components. Of AK Steel's 2018 sales, 63% went to the automotive industry, 15% to infrastructure and manufacturing industry and 22% to distributors and converters.

== History ==
The company was founded in 1899 as The American Rolling Mill Company (ARMCO) in Middletown, Ohio, where it operated a production facility. George Matthew Verity (1865–1942) was a founder and its first president.

In 1914, the company began publishing the monthly ARMCO bulletin "to facilitate an interchange of thought and suggestion, and to create a better understanding of the activities and problems of the Operating Department employees."

In 1922, it opened a second production facility, Ashland Works in Ashland, Kentucky.

In 1956, the company acquired American Bantam, the original creator and manufacturer of the World War II Jeep. American Bantam switched to producing trailers after losing the Jeep contract to Willys-Overland.

In 1971, Armco Steel purchased Kansas City-based engineering firm Burns & McDonnell; however, in 1985, employees of Burns & McDonnell secured a loan to buy the company from Armco. In 1978, Armco Steel was renamed Armco, Inc. It moved its headquarters to New Jersey in 1985.

In 1982, a recession threatened the U.S. steel industry. Several of the nation's steel companies reported losses for the first half of the year, while other companies, like Armco, were barely breaking even. In 1989, it entered into a limited partnership with Kawasaki Steel Corporation, which contributed several of its production facilities to the company.

While the company achieved over $1 billion in annual sales in the early 1990s, it was not profitable. The company then hired the 65 year old Tom Graham and Richard M. Wardrop, Jr. to improve its finances. These executives divested unprofitable operations and replaced most of the company's executives and managers. In 1993, the company moved its headquarters to Pittsburgh, Pennsylvania and renamed itself AK Steel Holdings reflecting its Armco roots and sizable investment by Kawasaki. The same year, the company sold the Kansas City Bolt and Nut Company plant to Bain Capital to avoid its shutdown. In March 1994, the company became a public company via an initial public offering, using the proceeds to pay down its unmanageable debt load. In 1995, the company moved its headquarters back to Middletown. In 1996, Graham made the decision to spend $1.1 billion to construct a new steel production facility in Rockport, Indiana. Rifts with its unions and its safety record, including 10 fatalities at its plants in 4 years, resulted in fines and scrutiny from the Occupational Safety and Health Administration (OSHA) in 1996 as well.

In 1999, the company acquired Armco Inc., its former parent company, for $1.3 billion.

In 2002, there was a lock-out at the Mansfield, Ohio plant after a disagreement on a three-year labor contract with 620 USWA employees. In 2003, the labor dispute in Mansfield ended, the union workers returning to work alongside those who'd replaced them. In 2006, there was another lockout of 2,700 workers in Middletown, Ohio about another contract renewal. In 2007, the company moved its headquarters to West Chester Township, Butler County, Ohio.

In 2014, the company acquired steel-making assets, including a coke-making facility and interests in 3 joint ventures that process flat-rolled steel products in Dearborn, Michigan, from Severstal for $700 million. In August 2017, the company acquired Precision Partners Holding Company for $360 million.

In March 2020, the company was acquired by Cleveland-Cliffs for $1.1 billion.

== Legal record ==
=== Environmental record ===
In June 2000, the United States Environmental Protection Agency (EPA) issued an Emergency Order pursuant to the Safe Drinking Water Act, Clean Air Act and the Clean Water Act to AK Steel's Butler Works in Butler, Pennsylvania concerning the nitrate/nitrite compounds being released into the Connoquenessing Creek, an occasional water source for the Borough of Zelienople, alleging that AK Steel had failed to properly dispose of hexavalent chromium. The issue was settled in 2004, with AK Steel agreeing to pay a total of $1.2 million.

In 2006, AK Steel reached a settlement to compensate for polychlorinated biphenyl (PCB) contamination in Middletown, Ohio. The settlement included cleanup work estimated to cost $12–13 million.

AK Steel was ranked first on the Top 20 polluters of 2010 by Mother Jones; dumping over 12,000 tons of toxic chemicals into Ohio waterways.

AK Steel was also ranked as a top polluter by the Political Economy Research Institute.

In early 2015, the EPA listed the Ohio River as the most contaminated body of water in the U.S. According to the EPA's Annual Toxics Release Inventory, of the 23 million pounds of chemicals discharged into the river in 2013, more than 70 percent came from AK Steel.

=== Middletown Works lockout ===
Armco and the Armco Employees Independent Federation (AEIF), a labor union, had a collective bargaining agreement in place in 2004 that required AK Steel to employ 3,114 workers, a "minimum base force guarantee". The agreement also authorized AK Steel to suspend the minimum number. On January 13, 2004, AK Steel informed the AEIF that it was suspending the minimum. The union then filed a grievance contesting the suspension. An arbitrator upheld the decision by AK Steel on July 1, 2004, subject to certain limitations, through at least May 10, 2005. The union sought and was granted a new hearing, and on July 1, 2005, the arbitrator issued a comprise total workforce. As part of the agreement the arbitrator allowed AK Steel to set aside financial payments to a fund, in lieu of hiring to the minimum, the amount of which was set by the arbitrator on October 7, 2005. On September 29, 2005, the AEIF filed a lawsuit against AK Steel in the United States District Court for the Southern District of Ohio (AEIF v. AK Steel Corp.; Case No. 1:05-CV-639), in which the AEIF sought to vacate that portion of the July 1, 2005 Award. AK Steel answered the complaint and filed counterclaims (AK Steel Corp. v. AEIF, Case No. 1:05-CV-531) on November 2, 2005.

On March 1, 2006, AK Steel began a lockout of about 2,700 workers at the Middletown Works plant in Middletown, Ohio. By the next day, the mill was operated by 1,800 salaried and temporary replacement workers.

On July 27, 2006, the AEIF affiliated with the International Association of Machinists and Aerospace Workers. In late October, AK offered a so-called final contract, which was rejected by the union by a vote of 2 to 1.

One year after the lockout started, in February 2007, AK Steel reached an agreement with the labor union; the union members ratified the proposed contract in March 2007.

As part of the agreement, the AEIF and AK Steel reached a joint settlement of their 5 counter lawsuits, with AK Steel paying $7,702,301. A third of the amount was for profit sharing, a third for an assistance fund for employee benefits of employees not recalled to work, and a third an escrow account to settle employee disputes and claims as a result of the lockout. The Employment Security Plan and the Trade and Craft Quota and Service/Support Group Quota (the "minimum base force guarantees") were completely terminated.

This lockout was the longest labor stalemate in the 105-year history of the Middletown Works. The previous longest stalemate had been a six-day company lockout in 1986. Prior to that lockout, Armco's Middletown works never lost one minute of production due to a labor issue.

=== Pittsburgh Logistics Systems Lawsuit ===
In late 2016, AK Steel notified Pittsburgh Logistics Systems, Inc. (D/b/a PLS Logistics), a company which had been managing all of AK's truck dispatch and rail operations since 1995, that it was being replaced by Ryder as of January 18, 2017. At the time, AK Steel constituted 32% of the PLS' revenue base, according to court filings. PLS battled both Ryder and AK Steel in the United States District Court for the Southern District of Ohio, arguing that Ryder should not be able to use the list of trucking companies that PLS had used while servicing AK. However, U.S. District Court Judge Michael R. Barrett rejected PLS's contention and cleared Ryder and AK to proceed with the use of these carriers.

== In popular culture ==
Hillbilly Elegy (2016), written by JD Vance, focuses on life in Middletown, Ohio and makes many references to the town's dependence on AK Steel's Middletown Works facility.

Working, by Studs Terkel, includes an interview with millworker Grace Clements, who worked at ARMCO making luggage components. Her story was the basis for the James Taylor song "Millwork" in the Broadway musical of the same name.

=== Historical films ===
- The Romance of Iron and Steel (1938) is a 21-minute, black and white film sponsored by the American Rolling Mill Company (ARMCO) and produced by Cinécraft Productions. The title of the film comes from a theme of the steel exhibit at the Great Lakes Exposition held in Cleveland, Ohio in 1936–37. The film opens with an overview of the ARMCO Research Lab followed by a series of tracking shots taken from overhead cranes in an ARMCO plant that offer a unique perspective into the process of making rolled steel. George M. Verity, ARMCO founder, ends the film with a message about “ARMCO men” and the company culture.
