= Raj Mamodia =

Indian American technology executive (born 1971)

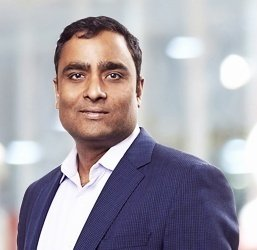
- Born: July 18, 1971 (age 55); Jaipur, Rajasthan, India
- Education: Northwestern University; Kellogg School of Management; Motilal Nehru National Institute of Technology, Allahabad
- Occupations: Founder, Chairman & CEO, Brillio

Raj Mamodia (born July 18, 1971) is an Indian-American technology executive. He was the CEO of Collabera in 2013, and founded Brillio in 2014, a technology company spun off from Collabera, where he is chairman and CEO.

== Early life ==
Raj Mamodia was born on July 18, 1971, in Jaipur, in the Indian state of Rajasthan.

He studied mechanical engineering at Motilal Nehru National Institute of Technology Allahabad and earned an MBA from Northwestern University Kellogg School of Management.

== Career ==
Before assuming the position of CEO at Collabera in 2013, Mamodia worked at information technology company Cognizant.

In 2014, the consulting division was separated from the parent company and incorporated as Brillio. Mamodia was Founder, Chairman, and CEO.

He oversaw investments in Brillio by Bain Capital and the Orogen Group, in 2019 and 2023 respectively.
