= Club deal =

Investment that involves two or more private equity firms

A club deal, in finance, refers to a leveraged buyout or other private equity investment that involves two or more private equity firms. It can also be referred as consortium or syndicated investment.

== Definition ==
In a club deal, the investor group of private equity firms pools its assets together and makes the acquisition collectively. The practice has allowed private equity to purchase larger and more expensive companies than each firm could acquire through its own private equity funds. By syndicating the equity ownership across a group of investment firms, each firm reduces its concentration and is able to maintain the diversification of its portfolio of investments.

== History ==
In the US, syndicated investment began as early as 1870 with a Pennsylvania Railroad offering. In the 1920s several syndicates existed for the purchase and sale of securities.

From 1984 to 2007, an average of 63% of US venture capital firm investments were syndicated according to a 2010 study, rising up to 77% in 2000.

In the US, the years from 2000 to 2010 have been called “the conspiratorial era.” The years from 2003 until 2007 were also described as "the era of club deals", since the 2006 antitrust investigation of the Department of Justice prompted a decrease;As of 2014 though, the Department has not brought charges. In 2007, private plaintiffs filed a first class action lawsuit against 13 private equity firms for conspiring in club deals to keep buyout prices down, followed by two more in the ensuing years, which the court consolidated and scaled down against 11 equity firms. In June 2014, Bain Capital Partners and Goldman Sachs settled for a combined $121 million after more than six years of litigation. An unnamed Goldman executive was quoted as saying “club etiquette” had prevailed in the $17.6 billion takeover of Freescale Semiconductor. End of July Blackstone, KKR, and TPG Capital settled for a combined $325 million, as published only in August. In August 2014 the Carlyle Group, the last remaining defendant, agreed to pay $115 million to settle. The settlements totaled $590.5 million and received final court approval in February 2015.

== Financial characteristics and outcomes ==
In a 2009 study of 198 leveraged buyouts in the US from 1984 to 2007, 29% were syndicated and "target shareholders receive[d] approximately 10% less of pre-bid firm equity value, or roughly 40% lower premiums, in club deals compared to sole-sponsored leveraged buyouts", the so-called club discount. However, the lower premiums disappeared with increasing percentage of institutional ownership in the target company, maybe because of institutional owners greater bargaining power for a higher price. On average, club deals were larger in transaction size than sole-sponsor buyouts, but fewer than 20 percent were larger than the largest sole-sponsor buyouts in the last four years. Premiums were lower in club deals announced prior to 2006 than since then. Club deals were no less risky as measured by return volatility and beta, than a sole-sponsor buyout. Even when controlling for size, risk and leverage ratios, club deals required more lenders than sole-sponsor buyouts.

According to authors of the 2010 study, the prevalence of syndication suggested a diseconomy associated with venture capital firm scale.

== Criticism ==
In 2006 the US Department of Justice, concerned with bid rigging, opened an investigation of private equity firms regarding their participation in consortiums in past sales.

The 2009 study of US buyouts from 1984 to 2007 with 59 club deals concluded that "[...] private equity clubs constrain the supply of debt financing for competing bids by aggressively locking up debt financiers”.

Institutional investors investing as limited partners in private equity funds criticize the practice of club deals that results in holdings in the same investment through different funds. Large limited partners have preferred to support large leveraged buyouts through equity co-investments alongside the leading financial sponsor.

== Examples ==
Among the most notable of the large club deals completed were the following:

- Houghton Mifflin, 2002 - Acquired by a consortium of Bain Capital, Blackstone and Thomas H. Lee Partners

- SunGard, 2005 - Acquired by a consortium of seven private equity investment firms led by Silver Lake Partners (Bain Capital, Blackstone, Goldman Sachs Alternatives, KKR, Providence Equity Partners, and Texas Pacific Group)

- Freescale Semiconductor, 2006 - Acquired by a consortium led by Blackstone and including the Carlyle Group, Permira, and TPG Capital)

- HCA, 2006 - Acquired by a consortium of KKR, Bain Capital, Merrill Lynch and the Frist family

- Kinder Morgan, 2006 - Acquired by a consortium including Goldman Sachs Alternatives, the Carlyle Group and Riverstone Holdings together with co-founder Richard Kinder

- NXP Semiconductors, 2006 - Acquired by a consortium of KKR, Silver Lake Partners and AlpInvest Partners

- Biomet, 2007 - Acquired by a consortium including Blackstone, KKR, TPG Capital and Goldman Sachs Alternatives

- TXU, 2007 - Acquired by a consortium including KKR, TPG Capital and Goldman Sachs Alternatives

== See also ==
- Private equity in the 21st century
- Leveraged buyout
- Equity co-investment
