= Brillio =

American IT services company

Brillio Technologies
- Type: Private
- Industry: Information technology
- Founded: 2014
- Headquarters: Santa Clara, California, U.S.
- Key people: Raj Mamodia (CEO)
- Services: IT Services
- Number of employees: >6,000 (2023)
- Website: www.brillio.com

Brillio is an IT consulting company focused on digital technologies and big data analytics headquartered in Santa Clara, California, United States.

== History ==
Brillio was formed in 2014 when Collabera, an information technology (IT) recruiting and staffing company firm based in Morristown, New Jersey, spun off its IT services division.

In October 2014, Brillio acquired Marketelligent, a Bangalore-based analytics provider founded in 2008. The company also invested in machine learning companies Albeado and Arundo Analytics.

In January 2019, private equity firm Bain Capital acquired a majority stake in the company.

In July 2020, Brillio announced the acquisition of Cognetik, based in Cary, North Carolina, with offices in Romania.

In 2021, Brillio acquired Salesforce integration partner Standav, and cloud engineering and security company Cedrus Digital.

In April 2023, Brillio partnered with Bangalore, India-based New Horizon College of Engineering to train students in cutting-edge technologies.

In May 2023, Brillio acquired UK–based cloud advisory firm CloudStratex. At the time, it was reported that the company had over 6,000 employees.

In September 2023, Brillio announced an investment by the Orogen Group.

== Philanthropy ==
Brillio's operates a corporate social responsibility (CSR) Program called Bringing Smiles.

Brillio partnered with India-based STEM Learning to organize the National STEM Challenge in Pune, India, with more than 2,500 students from 200 schools participating.
