= List of tallest buildings in Clayton =

Skyline of Clayton
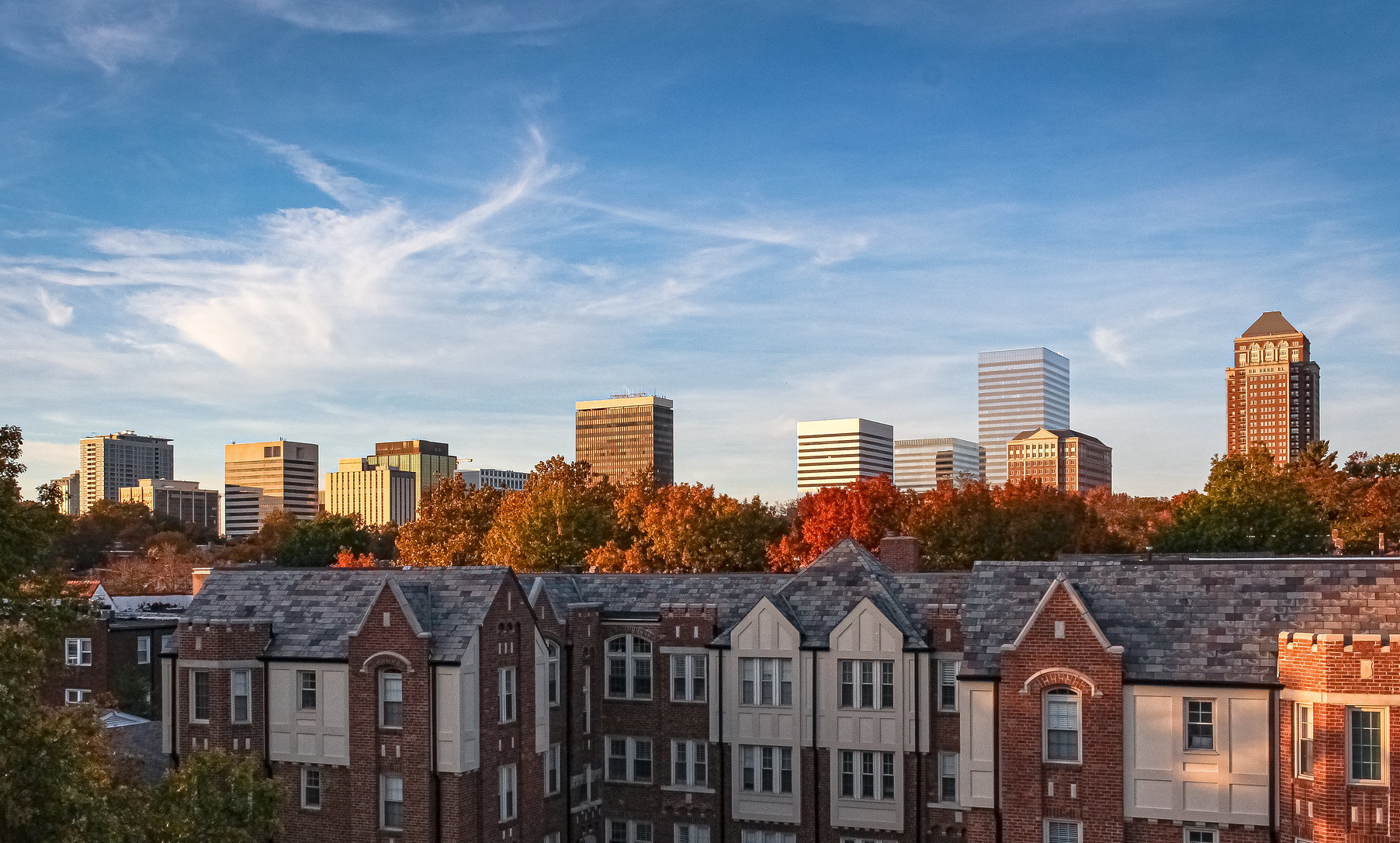
- Clayton in 2022
- Tallest building: Centene Plaza C (2020)
- Tallest building height: 419 ft (127.7 m)

Number of tall buildings (2026)
- Taller than 100 m (328 ft): 3

Number of tall buildings — feet
- Taller than 200 ft (61.0 m): 18
- Taller than 300 ft (91.4 m): 5

Clayton is the county seat of St. Louis County, Missouri, and part of Greater St. Louis metropolitan area. The city has a population of 17,512 people as of 2025. The city has 18 high-rises which stand over 200 ft (61 m) tall. As of January 2026, the tallest building in Clayton is Centene Plaza C which stands 419 ft (128 m) tall.

== Cityscape ==
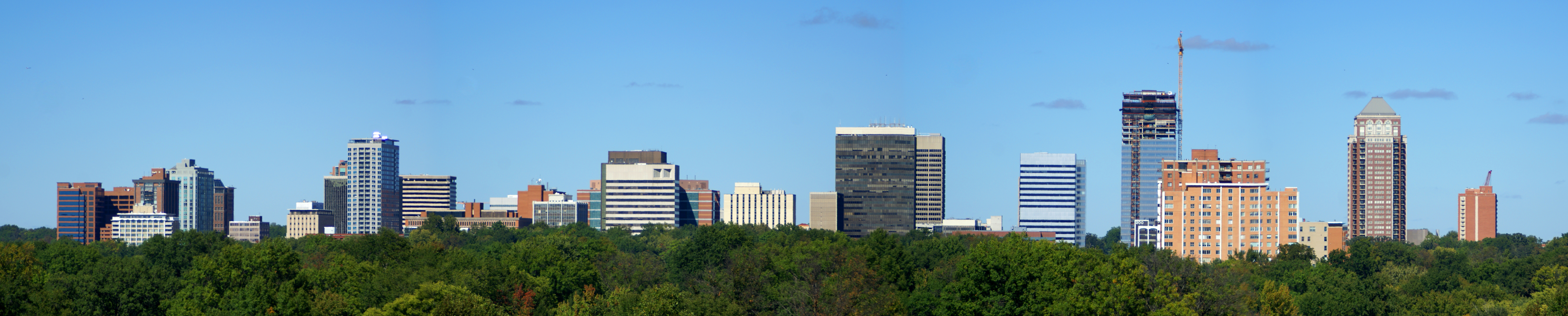
Panorama of Clayton's skyline in 2018, with Centene Plaza C visibly under construction on the right

== Tallest buildings ==
This list ranks completed buildings in Clayton that stand at least 200 ft (61 m) tall as of 2026, based on standard height measurement. This includes spires and architectural details but does not include antenna masts. The “Year” column indicates the year of completion. Buildings tied in height are sorted by year of completion with earlier buildings ranked first, and then alphabetically.

Was the tallest building in Clayton upon completion

Rank	Name	Image	Location	Height ft (m)	Floors	Year	Purpose	Notes
1	Centene Plaza C	Centene_Plaza_C_2025	38°38′58″N 90°20′02″W	419 (127.7)	28	2020	Office	Also known as Centene Plaza Two. Tallest building in Clayton since 2020. Tallest building completed in Clayton in the 2020s. Tallest building in Greater St. Louis outside of St. Louis. Headquarters for Centene Corporation.
2	The Plaza in Clayton Residential Tower	The_Plaza_in_Clayton,_Missouri_2021	38°38′52″N 90°19′56″W	408 (124.5)	30	2002	Residential	Tallest residential building in Clayton. Tallest building in Clayton from 2002 to 2020. Tallest building completed in Clayton in the 2000s.
3	212 South Meramec	Two_Twelve_Clayton_and_Bonhomme_Ave	38°38′51″N 90°20′23″W	380 (115.8)	27	2017	Residential	Tallest building in Clayton completed in the 2010s. Also known as Two Twelve Clayton.
4	The Sevens Building	Seven's_Building_Clayton	38°38′52″N 90°20′10″W	312 (95)	24	1969	Office	Tallest building in Clayton from 1969 to 2002. Tallest building in Clayton completed in the 1960s.
5	Pierre Laclede Center II	Pierre_Laclede_Center_from_the_SW	38°39′01″N 90°20′08″W	308 (94)	24	1970	Office	Tallest building in Clayton completed in the 1970s.
6	101 South Hanley	NW_corner,_101_South_Hanley,_Clayton,_MO	38°38′54″N 90°20′05″W	272 (83)	19	1986	Office	Also known as the Hanley Corporate Tower and Interco Tower.
7	Clayton on the Park	Clayton on the Park	38°38′54″N 90°20′29″W	266 (81)	23	2000	Residential	
8	Park Tower	Park_Tower_Clayton	38°38′51″N 90°20′29″W	262 (80)	24	1966	Residential	Tallest building in Clayton from 1966 to 1969.
9	PNC Center	National_City_Center_Clayton	38°38′53″N 90°20′16″W	262 (80)	18	1973	Office	Formerly known as the National City Center and also known as Chromalloy Plaza.
10	Centene Plaza B	Centene_Plaza_B_2025	38°38′58″N 90°20′04″W	262 (80)	17	2010	Office	Part of Centene Corporation's corporate headquarters.
11	Maryland Walk	Maryland_Walk_Clayton_Mo_2025	38°39′08″N 90°20′26″W	262 (79.8)	17	2006	Residential	
12	The Plaza in Clayton Office Tower		38°38′53″N 90°20′00″W	229 (69.8)	15	2002	Office	
13	Pierre Laclede Center I		38°39′02″N 90°20′04″W	220 (67)	16	1963	Office	Tallest building in Clayton from 1963 to 1966.
14	Merrill Lynch Centre	Merrill Lynch Centre Clayton, Missouri skyline panoramic (cropped)	38°39′06″N 90°20′35″W	214 (65) (Note: Sources do not state the exact height of this building. This figure was determined using Google Earth by subtracting the altitude of the building's lowest main pedestrian open-air entrance from its highest architectural point.)	15	2000	Office	
15	Shaw Park Plaza	—	38°39′03″N 90°20′31″W	208 (63)	14	2001	Office	
16	Bemiston Tower	—	38°38′48″N 90°20′16″W	205 (62.4)	14	1982	Office	
17	Commerce Bank Building		38°39′00″N 90°20′25″W	201 (61.2)	15	1971	Office	
18	Jefferson Smurfit Centre	—	38°39′07″N 90°20′33″W	200 (61)	14	1985	Office	

== Tallest under construction or proposed ==
=== Under construction ===
As of 2026, there are no buildings planned to be taller than 200 ft (61 m) that are under construction in Clayton. The most recent building constructed taller than that height is Centene Plaza C, which was completed in 2020.

=== Proposed ===
As of 2026, there are no approved or proposed buildings planned to be taller than 200 ft (61 m) in Clayton.

== Timeline of tallest buildings ==
Name	Image	Years as tallest	Height ft (m)	Floors	Notes
Pierre Laclede Center I	Pierre_Laclede_Center_1	1963-1966	220 ft (67 m)	16	
Park Tower	Park Tower Clayton	1966–1969	262 (80)	24	
The Sevens Building	Seven's Building Clayton	1969–2002	312 (95)	24	
The Plaza in Clayton Residential Tower	The_Plaza_in_Clayton_Residences	2002–2020	408 (124.5)	30	
Centene Plaza C	Centene_Centre	2020–Present	419 (127.7)	28	

== See also ==
- List of tallest buildings in St. Louis
- List of tallest buildings in Kansas City
- List of tallest buildings in Missouri
