= Ricardo Poma =

Salvadoran businessman (1946–2025)

Ricardo Poma (3 May 1946 – 24 August 2025) was a Salvadoran businessman and philanthropist who was the chief executive officer of the family-owned conglomerate Grupo Poma, based in San Salvador, El Salvador.

== Life and career ==
Poma obtained an industrial engineering degree from Princeton University in 1967 and an MBA from Harvard Business School in 1970. When he returned to El Salvador, Ricardo joined the family business; he took the reins of the conglomerate from his father Luis Poma in the 1980s.

His family is one of the most affluent and influential in El Salvador.

Ricardo Poma dedicated a significant amount of his time to social projects and institutions, such as the Salvadoran Foundation for Health and Human Development (FUSAL), the Advanced School of Business and Economics (ESEN) and Fundacion Poma, focusing on culture, education and health programs in El Salvador and Central America. He was also a member of the President's Leadership Council of the Inter-American Dialogue.

Poma was an early investor in Bain Capital.

Poma died on 24 August 2025, at the age of 79.
