= The Sevens Building =

Office building in Clayton, Missouri

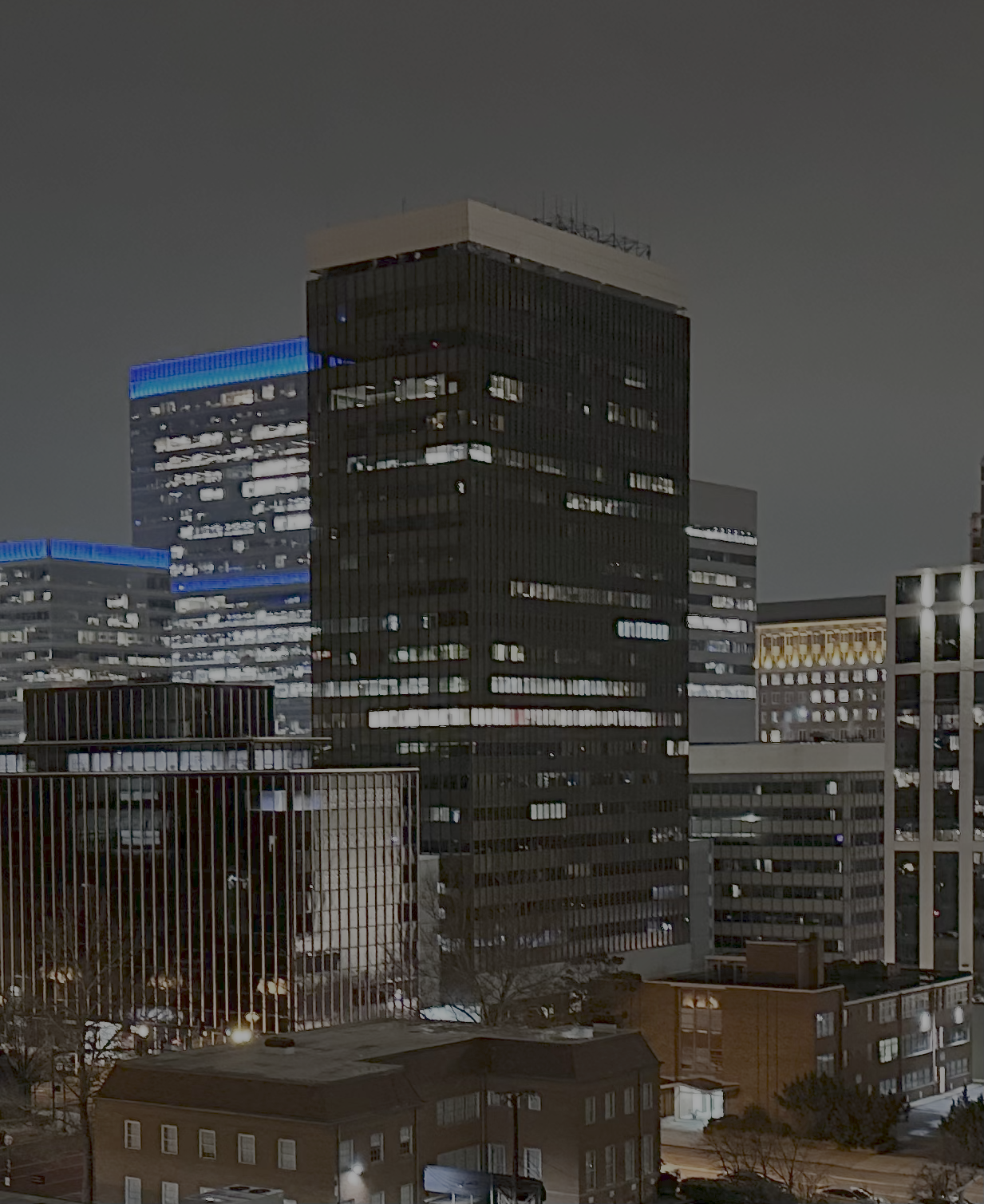
- Seven's_Building_Clayton The Sevens Building in 2025

- Location within Missouri The Sevens Building (the United States)

General information
- Status: Completed
- Type: Office
- Architectural style: International
- Location: 7777 Bonhomme Avenue, Clayton, Missouri, United States
- Coordinates: 38°38′52″N 90°20′10″W
- Completed: 1969

Height
- Roof: 312 ft (95 m)

Technical details
- Floor count: 24

The Sevens Building is a 312 ft (95 m) tall international style office building located on 7777 Bonhomme Avenue in Downtown Clayton, Missouri. It was built in 1969 and has 24 floors. When it was built it was the tallest building in Clayton until 2002 when it was surpassed by The Plaza in Clayton Residential Tower. As of January 2026, it is the 4th-tallest building in Clayton. Notable tenants include Edward Jones, Riot Games, and Collabera.

In 2024, IMC Management acquired the building with Lincoln, who originally bought the building in 2015 through a joint venture with Stockbridge.

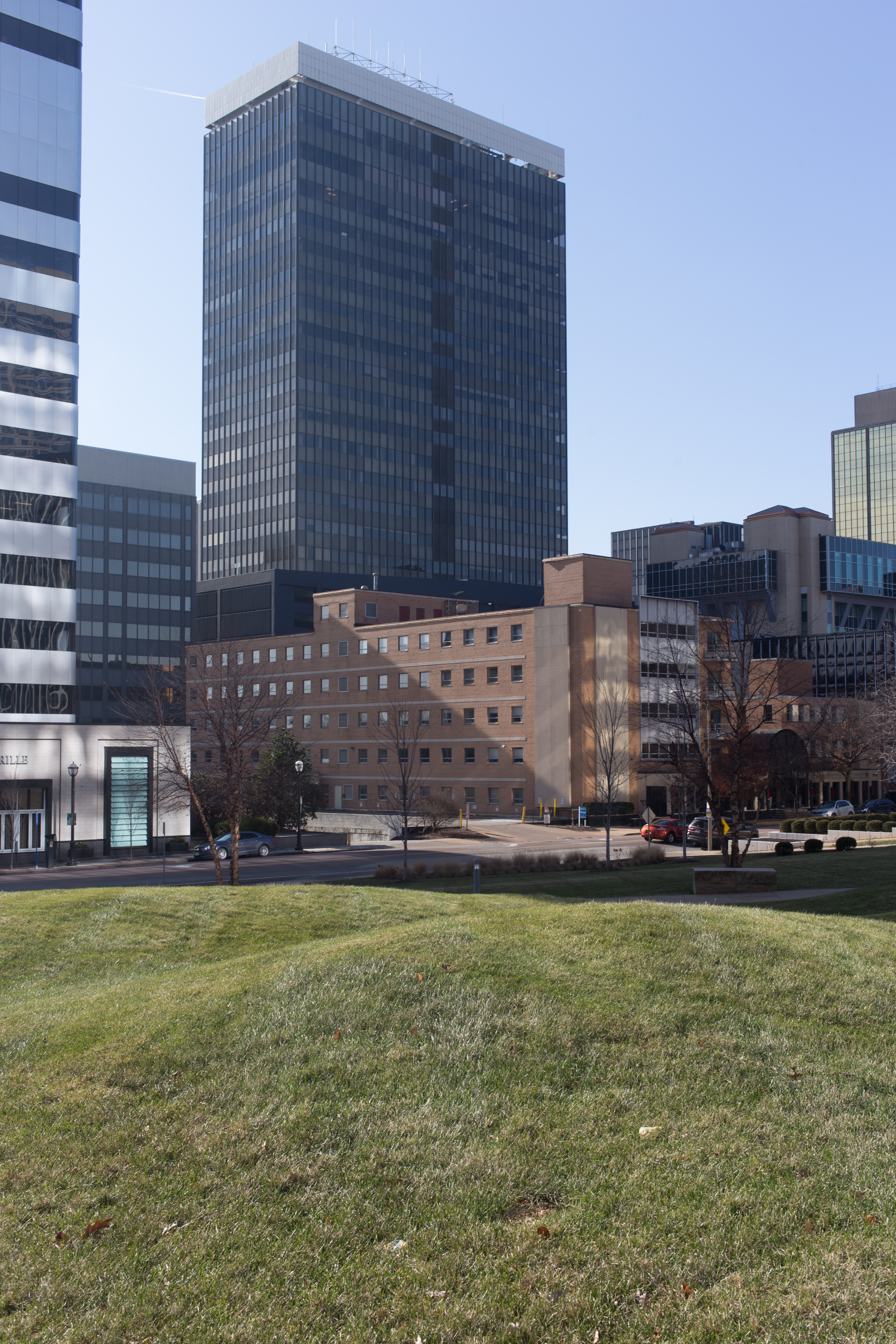
The Sevens Building in 2018.

== See also ==
- List of tallest buildings in Clayton, Missouri
- List of tallest buildings in St. Louis
- List of tallest buildings in Kansas City
- List of tallest buildings in Missouri
- PNC Center (Clayton, Missouri)
