= Dade Behring =

- Company type: Private
- Industry: Medical diagnostics
- Founded: 1995
- Founder: Dr. Emil von Behring, Bain Capital (via Dade International)
- Defunct: 2007
- Fate: Acquired by Siemens AG in 2007
- Headquarters: Deerfield, Illinois; Glasgow, Delaware
- Area served: 43 countries
- Key people: Jim Reid-Anderson (CEO)
- Products: BN ProSpec automated analyzer, RxL automated analyzer, StreamLab lab automation
- Revenue: $1.7 billion (2006)

Dade Behring was a company which manufactured testing machinery and supplies for the medical diagnostics industry, based in Deerfield, Illinois and Glasgow, Delaware (formerly a DuPont site).

== History ==
Behring Diagnostics, a Frankfurt-based company bearing Dr. Emil von Behring's name, was spun off from Hoechst AG (which later became Aventis) in 1995. Soon after its formation, the company acquired a drug-testing firm called Syva Company and, in 1996, the diagnostics and clinical chemistry division of DuPont.

Dade Behring was born from the merger of Behring Diagnostics and Deerfield, Illinois-based Dade International, a private, independent company created by a group of investors led by Bain Capital who had bought Baxter International's diagnostics unit for over $440 million, in late 1994. The combined operations of the two companies reached sales of $1.2 billion and employed a workforce of 6,400 worldwide.

The new firm became the world's largest company devoted to diagnostics, with sales of over $500 million. The "Dade" part of the name is a legacy of the Dade Reagents Company, founded by Dr. John Elliott near the end of the 1940s to provide consistent, high quality typing and testing of blood.

Jim Reid-Anderson joined Dade Behring Holdings Inc, in 1996 as executive vice president and chief financial officer (CFO) and became chief administrative officer and CFO in September 1997.

Nelson Chai joined Dade Behring in 1997 as corporate vice president of worldwide field finance; he later became their senior vice president of business development.

In April 1999, Reid-Anderson was promoted to the role of president and chief operating officer and then CEO in September 2000. He was elected as the chairman of the board in October 2002.

In 2002 the company filed for Chapter 11 bankruptcy, but then reorganized and recovered in a spectacular way. Brad Pattelli was on the board of directors and an influential figure in the reorganization. By 2005, the firm employed more than 6,000 workers and had operations in 43 countries to serve more than 25,000 medical customers.

With 2006 revenue of more than $1.7 billion, Dade Behring was the world's largest company solely dedicated to clinical diagnostics, as opposed to competitors like Abbott and Roche, whose operations covered other markets including the pharmaceutical industry.

In 2007 Dade Behring was acquired by the German conglomerate Siemens AG. Based on Dade's 83 million outstanding shares, Siemens’ offer of $77 a share in cash, on a diluted basis, had a value of nearly $6.4 billion.

== Products ==
- BN ProSpec automated analyzer of protein in CSF, plasma, serum and urine samples
- RxL automated analyzer
- StreamLab lab automation

== People associated with Dade Behring ==
- Daryl Metcalfe was a Dade Behring employee, prior to entering politics.
- Samuel K. Skinner was on the board of directors.
