= PNC Center (Clayton, Missouri) =

Office building in Clayton, Missouri

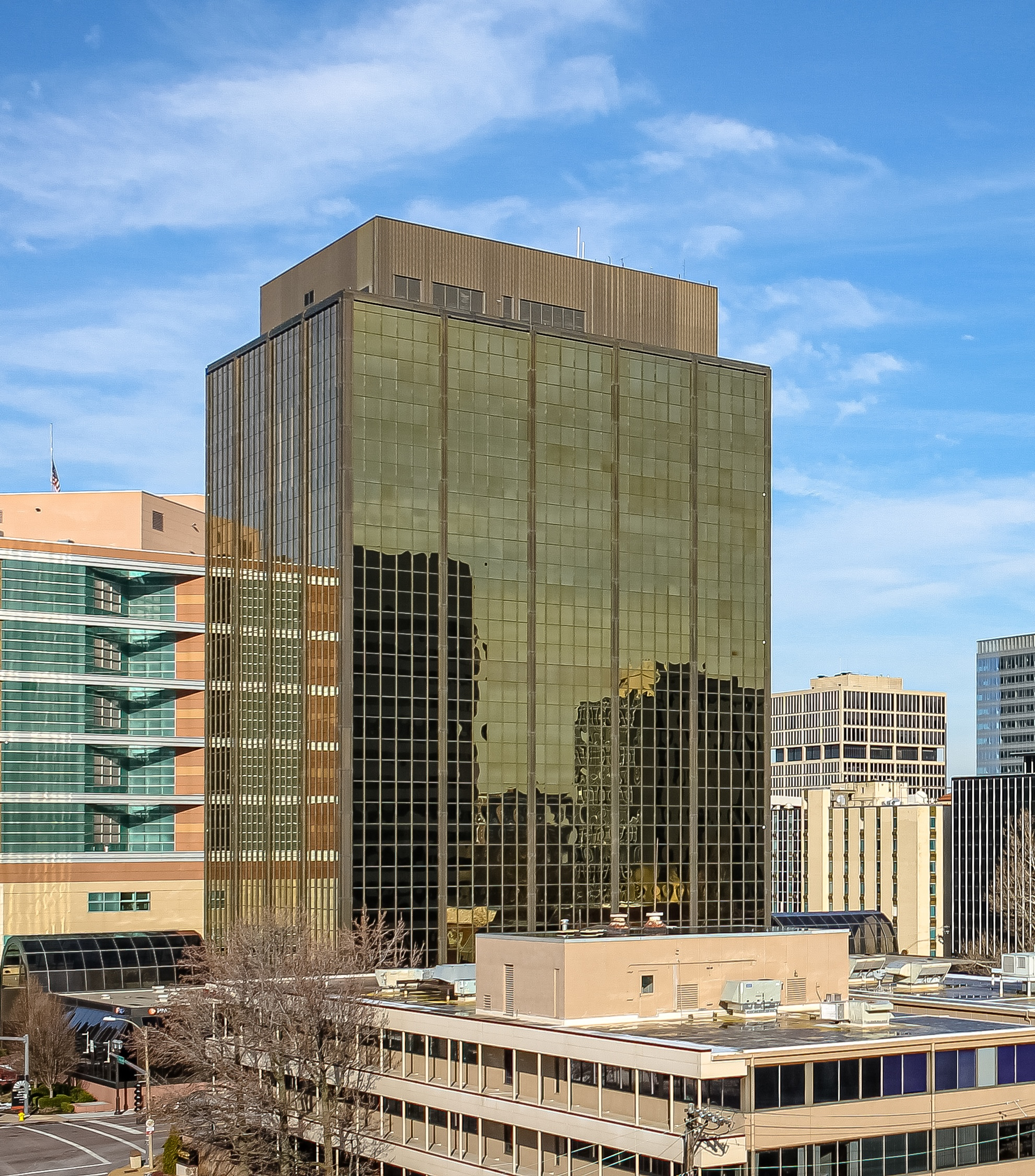
- National_City_Center_Clayton PNC Center in 2013

- Location within Missouri PNC Center (Clayton, Missouri) (the United States)

General information
- Status: Completed
- Type: Office
- Architectural style: International
- Location: 120 South Central Avenue, Clayton, Missouri, United States
- Coordinates: 38°38′53″N 90°20′17″W
- Completed: 1973

Height
- Roof: 262 ft (80 m)

Technical details
- Floor count: 18

Design and construction
- Architect: Jack H. Tyrer

PNC Center (formerly the National City Center and also known as Chromalloy Plaza) is a 262 ft (80 m) tall international style office building located on 120 South Central Avenue in Downtown Clayton, Missouri. It was built in 1973 and has 18 floors. When it was completed it was the 3rd-tallest building in Clayton, as of January 2026 it is the 8th-tallest building in Clayton. Notable tenants include AIG, PNC, and the Sansone Group who is the leasing and property management team for the building.

In 2024, the Sansone group revealed a new 11,435 sq ft amenities center for the building. The new amenities center was designed by local architect Ken Domash, and Los Angeles-based architect David Netto.

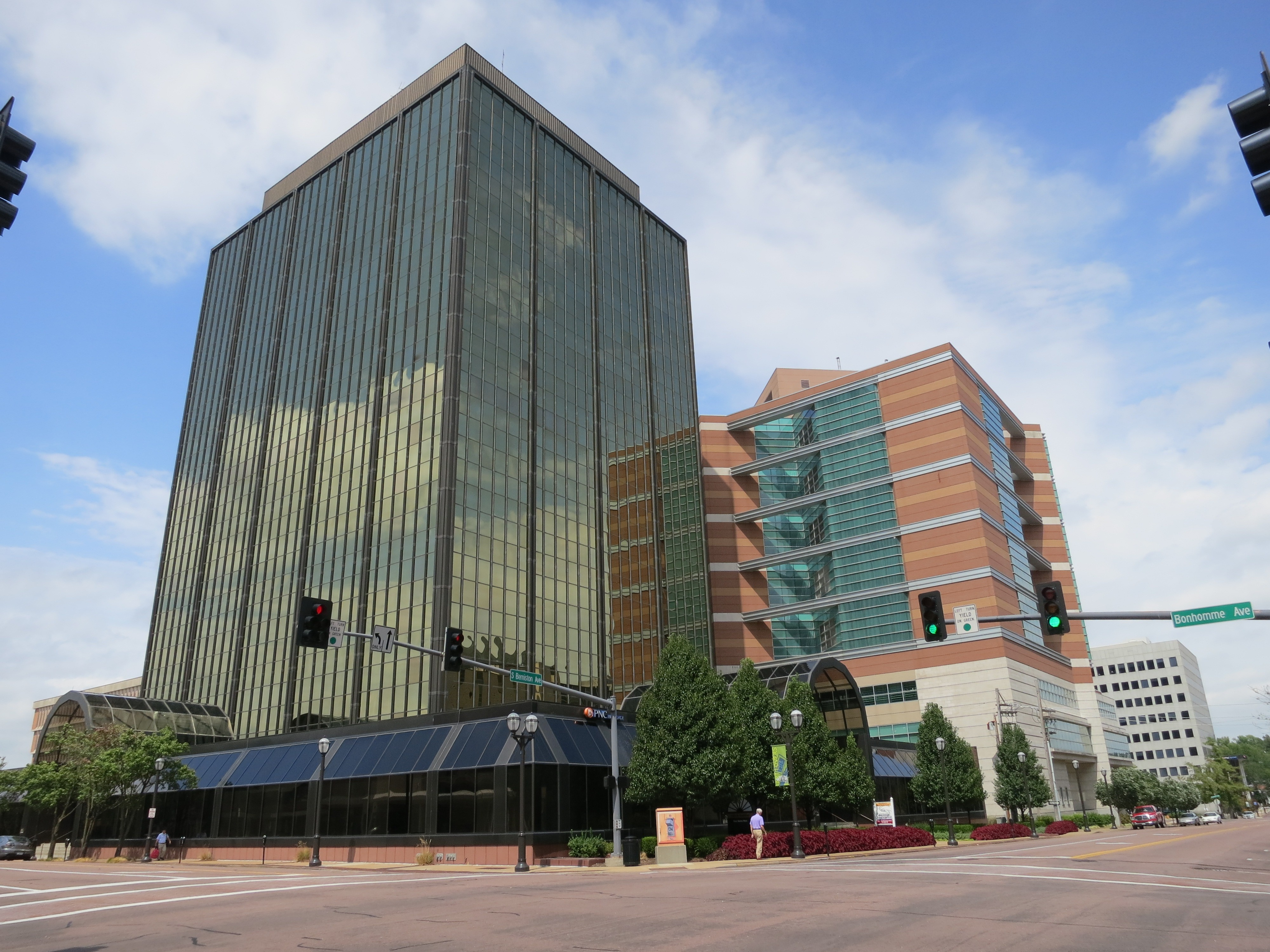
The PNC Center in 2012.

== See also ==
- List of tallest buildings in Clayton, Missouri
- List of tallest buildings in St. Louis
- Clayton, Missouri
- PNC Financial Services
- The Sevens Building
