= Bain Capital =

American investment firm

Bain Capital, LP

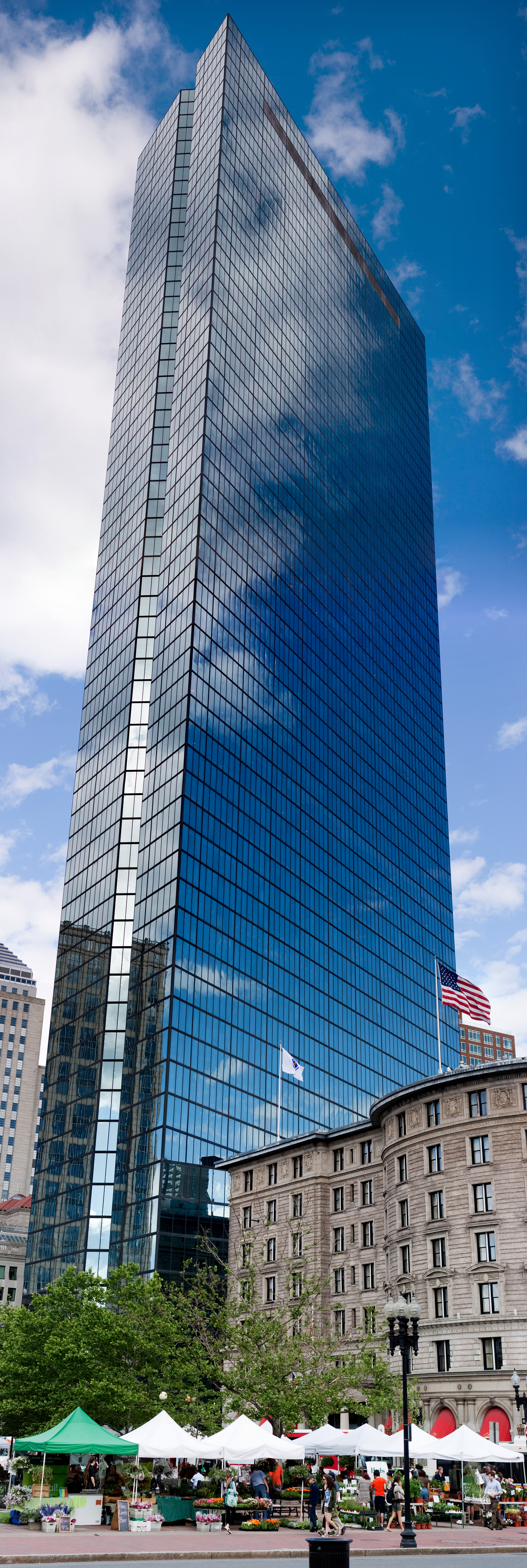
- Headquarters at 200 Clarendon Street
- Type: Private
- Industry: Alternative investment
- Founded: 1984; 42 years ago
- Founder: Mitt Romney; T. Coleman Andrews III; Eric Kriss
- Headquarters: 200 Clarendon Street; Boston, Massachusetts, U.S.
- Number of locations: Boston, Chicago, Dublin, Hong Kong, London, Melbourne, Mumbai, Munich, New York, Palo Alto, San Francisco, Shanghai, Sydney and Tokyo
- Key people: David Gross (managing partner); John P. Connaughton (chair); Jonathan Lavine (senior advisor)
- Products: Venture capital, investment management, public equity, private equity, real estate and credit products
- Revenue: ▲US$297.8 million (2023)
- AUM: ▲US$180 billion (2024)
- Owner: Employees
- Number of employees: 1,750+ (2025)
- Website: baincapital.com

Bain Capital, LP is an American private investment firm based in Boston, Massachusetts, with around $185 billion of assets under management. It specializes in private equity, venture capital, credit, public equity, impact investing, life sciences, crypto, tech opportunities, partnership opportunities, special situations, and real estate. Bain Capital invests across a range of industry sectors and geographic regions. The firm was founded in 1984 by partners from the consulting firm Bain & Company. The company is headquartered at 200 Clarendon Street in Boston with 24 offices in North America, Europe, Asia, and Australia.

Since its establishment, Bain Capital has invested in or acquired hundreds of companies, including AMC Theatres, Artisan Entertainment, Aspen Education Group, Apex Tool Group, Brookstone, Burger King, Burlington Coat Factory, Canada Goose, DIC Entertainment, Domino's Pizza, DoubleClick, Dunkin' Donuts, D&M Holdings, Guitar Center, Hospital Corporation of America (HCA), iHeartMedia, ITP Aero, KB Toys, Namirial, Sealy, Sports Authority, Staples, Toys "R" Us, Virgin Australia, Virgin Voyages, Warner Music Group, Fingerhut, Athenahealth, The Weather Channel, Varsity Brands and Apple Leisure Group, which includes AMResorts and Apple Vacations. The company and its actions during its first 15 years became the subject of political and media scrutiny as a result of co-founder Mitt Romney's later political career, especially his 2012 presidential campaign.

In June 2023, Bain Capital was ranked 13th in Private Equity International's PEI 300 ranking of the largest private equity firms in the world.

== History ==
=== 1984 founding and early history ===
Bain Capital was founded in 1984 by Bain & Company partners Mitt Romney, T. Coleman Andrews III, and Eric Kriss, after Bill Bain had offered Romney the chance to head a new venture that would invest in companies and apply Bain's consulting techniques to improve operations. In addition to the three founding partners, the early team included Fraser Bullock, Robert F. White, Joshua Bekenstein, Adam Kirsch, and Geoffrey S. Rehnert. Romney initially held the titles of president and managing general partner or managing partner. He later became referred to as managing director or CEO as well. He was also the sole shareholder of the firm. At the time, the firm had fewer than ten employees.

In the face of skepticism from potential investors, Romney and his partners spent a year raising the $37 million in funds needed to start the new operation. Bain partners put in $12 million of their own money and sourced the rest from wealthy individuals. Early investors included Boston real estate mogul Mortimer Zuckerman and Robert Kraft, the owner of the New England Patriots football team. They also included members of elite Salvadoran families such as Ricardo Poma whose capital fled the country's civil war. They and other wealthy Latin Americans invested $9 million primarily through offshore companies registered in Panama.

While Bain Capital was founded by Bain executives, the firm was not an affiliate or a division of Bain & Company but rather a completely separate company. Initially, the two firms shared the same offices—in an office tower at Copley Place in Boston—and a similar approach to improving business operations. However, the two firms had put in place certain protections to avoid sharing information between the two companies and the Bain & Company executives had the ability to veto investments that posed potential conflicts of interest. Bain Capital also provided an investment opportunity for partners of Bain & Company. The firm initially gave a cut of its profits to Bain & Company, but Romney later persuaded Bill Bain to give that up.

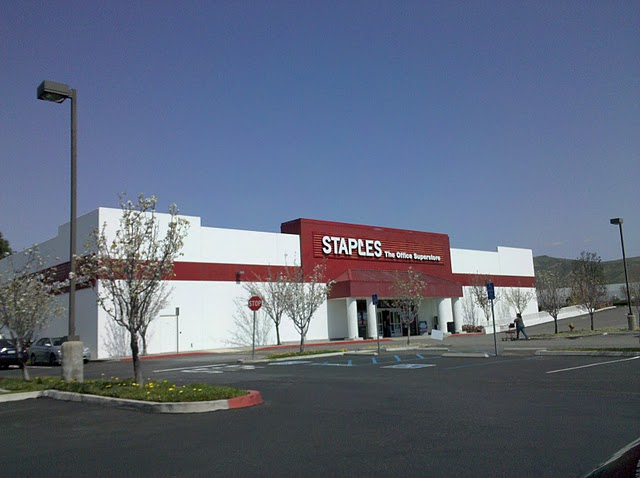
Bain Capital was an initial investor in Staples, Inc.

The Bain Capital team was initially reluctant to invest its capital. By 1985, things were going poorly enough that Romney considered closing the operation, returning investors' money to them, and having the partners go back to their old positions. The partners saw weak spots in so many potential deals that by 1986, very few had been done.

At first, Bain Capital focused on venture capital opportunities. One of Bain's earliest and most notable venture investments was in Staples, Inc., the office supply retailer. In 1986, Bain provided $4.5 million to two supermarket executives, Leo Kahn and Thomas G. Stemberg, to open an office supply supermarket in Brighton, Massachusetts. The fast-growing retail chain went public in 1989; by 1996, the company had grown to over 1,100 stores, and as of fiscal year-end January 2012, Staples reached over $20 billion in sales, nearly $1.0B in net income, 87,000 employees, and 2,295 stores. Bain Capital eventually reaped a nearly sevenfold return on its investment, and Romney sat on the Staples board of directors for over a decade. Another very successful investment occurred in 1986 when $1 million was invested in medical equipment maker Calumet Coach, which eventually returned $34 million. A few years later, Bain Capital made an investment in the technology research outfit the Gartner Group, which ended up returning a 16-fold gain.

Bain invested the $37 million of capital in its first fund in twenty companies and by 1989 was generating an annualized return in excess of 50 percent. By the end of the decade, Bain's second fund (raised in 1987) had deployed $106 million into 13 investments. As the firm began organizing around funds, each such fund was run by a specific general partnership—that included all Bain Capital executives as well as others—which in turn was controlled by Bain Capital Inc., the management company that Romney had full ownership control of. As CEO, Romney had a final say in every deal made.

=== 1990s ===
In the 1990s, Bain Capital started several affiliates that supported its private equity and other assets classes. The long-short equity hedge fund, Brookside Capital, was founded in 1996 and, Sankaty Advisors, the company's fixed income affiliate, was started two years later. Building affiliates for the firm was directed by three conditions: that it leveraged its core skills; one of its Managing Directors has a leadership role; and, the new business invests in attractive asset class.

Beginning in 1989, the firm, which began as a venture capital source investing in start-up companies, adjusted its strategy to focus on leveraged buyouts and growth capital investments in more mature companies. Their model was to buy existing firms with money mostly borrowed against their assets, partner with existing management to apply Bain methodology to their operations (rather than the hostile takeovers practiced in other leverage buyout scenarios), and sell them off in a few years. Existing CEOs were offered large equity stakes in the process, owing to Bain Capital's belief in the emerging agency theory that CEOs should be bound to maximizing shareholder value rather than other goals. By the end of 1990, Bain had raised $175 million of capital and financed 35 companies with combined revenues of $3.5 billion.

In July 1992, Bain acquired Ampad (originally American Pad & Paper) from Mead Corporation, which had acquired the company in 1986. Mead, which had been experiencing difficulties integrating Ampad's products into its existing product lines, generated a cash gain of $56 million on the sale. Under Bain's ownership, the company enjoyed a significant growth in sales from $106.7 million in 1992 to $583.9 million in 1996, when the company was listed on the New York Stock Exchange. Under Bain's ownership, the company also made a number of acquisitions, including writing products company SCM in July 1994, brand names from the American Trading and Production Corporation in August 1995, WR Acquisition and the Williamhouse-Regency Division of Delaware, Inc. in October 1995, Niagara Envelope Company, Inc. in 1996, and Shade/Allied, Inc. in February 1997. Ampad's revenue began to decline in 1997, and the company laid off employees and closed production facilities to maintain profitability. Employment declined from 4,105 in 1996 to 3,800 in 2000. The company ceased trading on the New York stock exchange on December 22, 2000, and filed for bankruptcy in 2001. At the time of the bankruptcy, Bain Capital held a 34.9% equity ownership interest in the company. The assets were acquired in 2003 by Crescent Investments. Bain's eight years' of involvement in Ampad is estimated to have generated over $100 million in profits ($60 million in dividends, $45–50 million from the proceeds from stock issued after the company went public, and $1.5-2 million in annual management fees).

In 1994, Bain acquired Totes, a producer of umbrellas and overshoes. Three years later, Totes, under Bain's ownership, acquired Isotoner, a producer of leather gloves.

Bain, together with Thomas H. Lee Partners, acquired Experian, the consumer credit reporting business of TRW Inc., in 1996 for more than $1 billion. Formerly known as TRW's Information Systems and Services unit, Experian is one of the leading providers of credit reports on consumers and businesses in the US. The company was sold to Great Universal Stores for $1.7 billion just months after being acquired. Other notable Bain investments of the late 1990s, included Sealy Corporation, the manufacturer of mattresses; Alliance Laundry Systems; Domino's Pizza and Artisan Entertainment.

Much of the firm's profits was earned from a relatively small number of deals, with Bain Capital's overall success and failure rate being about even. One study of 68 deals that Bain Capital made up through the 1990s found that the firm lost money or broke even on 33 of them. Another study that looked at the eight-year period following 77 deals during the same time found that in 17 cases the company went bankrupt or out of business, and in 6 cases Bain Capital lost all its investment. But 10 deals were very successful and represented 70 percent of the total profits.

Romney had two diversions from Bain Capital during the first half of the decade. From January 1991 to December 1992, Romney was the CEO of Bain & Company where he led the successful turnaround of the consulting firm (he remained managing general partner of Bain Capital during this time). In November 1993, he took a leave of absence for his unsuccessful 1994 run for the U.S. Senate seat from Massachusetts; he returned the day after the election in November 1994. During that time, Ampad workers went on strike, and asked Romney to intervene; Bain Capital lawyers asked him not to get involved, although he did meet with the workers to tell them he had no position of active authority in the matter.

In 1994, Bain invested in Steel Dynamics, based in Fort Wayne, Indiana, a prosperous steel company that has grown to the fifth largest in the US, employs about 6,100 people, and produces carbon steel products with 2010 revenues of $6.3 billion on steel shipments of 5.3 million tons. In 1993, Bain acquired the Armco Worldwide Grinding System steel plant in Kansas City, Missouri and merged it with its steel plant in Georgetown, South Carolina to form GST Steel. The Kansas City plant had a strike in 1997 and Bain closed the plant in 2001, laying off 750 workers when it went into bankruptcy. The South Carolina plant closed in 2003 but subsequently reopened under a different owner. At the time of its bankruptcy it reported $553.9 million in debts against $395.2 in assets. Bain reported $58.4 million in profits, the employee pension fund had a liability of $44 million.

Bain's investment in Dade Behring represented a significant investment in the medical diagnostics industry. In 1994, Bain, together with Goldman Sachs Alternatives completed a carveout acquisition of Dade International, the medical diagnostics division of Baxter International in a $440 million acquisition. Dade's private equity owners merged the company with DuPont's in vitro diagnostics business in May 1996 and subsequently with the Behring Diagnostics division of Hoechst AG in 1997. Aventis, the successor of Hoechst, acquired 52% of the combined company. In 1999, the company reported $1.3 billion of revenue and completed a $1.25 billion leveraged recapitalization that resulted in a payout to shareholders. The dividend, taken together with other previous shareholder dividends resulted in an eightfold return on investment to Bain Capital and Goldman Sachs. Revenues declined from 1999 through 2002 and despite attempts to cut costs through layoffs the company entered into bankruptcy in 2002. Following its restructuring, Dade Behring emerged from Bankruptcy in 2003 and continued to operate independently until 2007 when the business was acquired by Siemens Medical Solutions. Bain and Goldman Sachs lost their remaining stock in the company as part of the bankruptcy.

By the end of the decade, Bain Capital was on its way to being one of the top private equity firms in the nation, having increased its number of partners from 5 to 18, having 115 employees overall, and having $4 billion under its management. The firm's average annual return on investments was 113 percent. It had made between 100 and 150 deals where it acquired and then sold a company.

=== 1999–2002 ===
Romney took a paid leave of absence from Bain Capital in February 1999, when he became the head of the Salt Lake Organizing Committee for the 2002 Winter Olympics. The decision caused turmoil at Bain Capital, with a power struggle ensuing. Some partners left and founded the Audax Group and Golden Gate Capital. Other partners threatened to leave, and there was a prospect of eight-figure lawsuits being filed. Romney was worried that the firm might be destroyed, but the crisis ebbed.

Romney was not involved in day-to-day operations of the firm after starting the Olympics position. Those were handled by a management committee, consisting of five of the fourteen remaining active partners with the firm. However, according to some interviews and press releases during 1999, Romney said he was keeping a part-time function at Bain.

During his leave of absence, Romney continued to be listed in filings to the U.S. Securities and Exchange Commission as "sole shareholder, sole director, Chief Executive Officer and President". The SEC filings reflected the legal reality and the ownership interest in the Bain Capital management company. In practice, former Bain partners have stated that Romney's attention was mostly occupied by his Olympics position. He did stay in regular contact with his partners, and traveled to meet with them several times, signing corporate and legal documents and paying attention to his own interests within the firm and to his departure negotiations. Bain Capital Fund VI in 1998 was the last one Romney was involved in; investors were worried that with Romney gone, the firm would have trouble raising money for Bain Capital Fund VII in 2000, but in practice the $2.5 billion was raised without much trouble. His former partners have said that Romney had no role in assessing other new investments after February 1999, nor was he involved in directing the company's investment funds. Discussions over the final terms of Romney's departure dragged on during this time, with Romney negotiating for the best deal he could get and his continuing position as CEO and sole shareholder giving him the leverage to do so.

Although he had left open the possibility of returning to Bain after the Olympics, Romney made his crossover to politics in 1999. His separation from the firm was finalized in early 2002. Romney negotiated a ten-year retirement agreement with Bain Capital that allowed him to receive a passive profit share and interest as a retired partner in some Bain Capital entities, including buyout and Bain Capital investment funds, in exchange for his ownership in the management company. Because the private equity business continued to thrive, this deal would bring him millions of dollars in annual income. Romney was the first and last CEO of Bain Capital; since his departure became final, it has continued to be run by management committee.

Bain Capital itself, and especially its actions and investments during its first 15 years, came under press scrutiny as the result of Romney's 2008 and 2012 presidential campaigns, including accusations of asset stripping. Romney's leave of absence and the level of activity he had within the firm during the 1999-2002 period also garnered attention.

=== Early 2000s ===
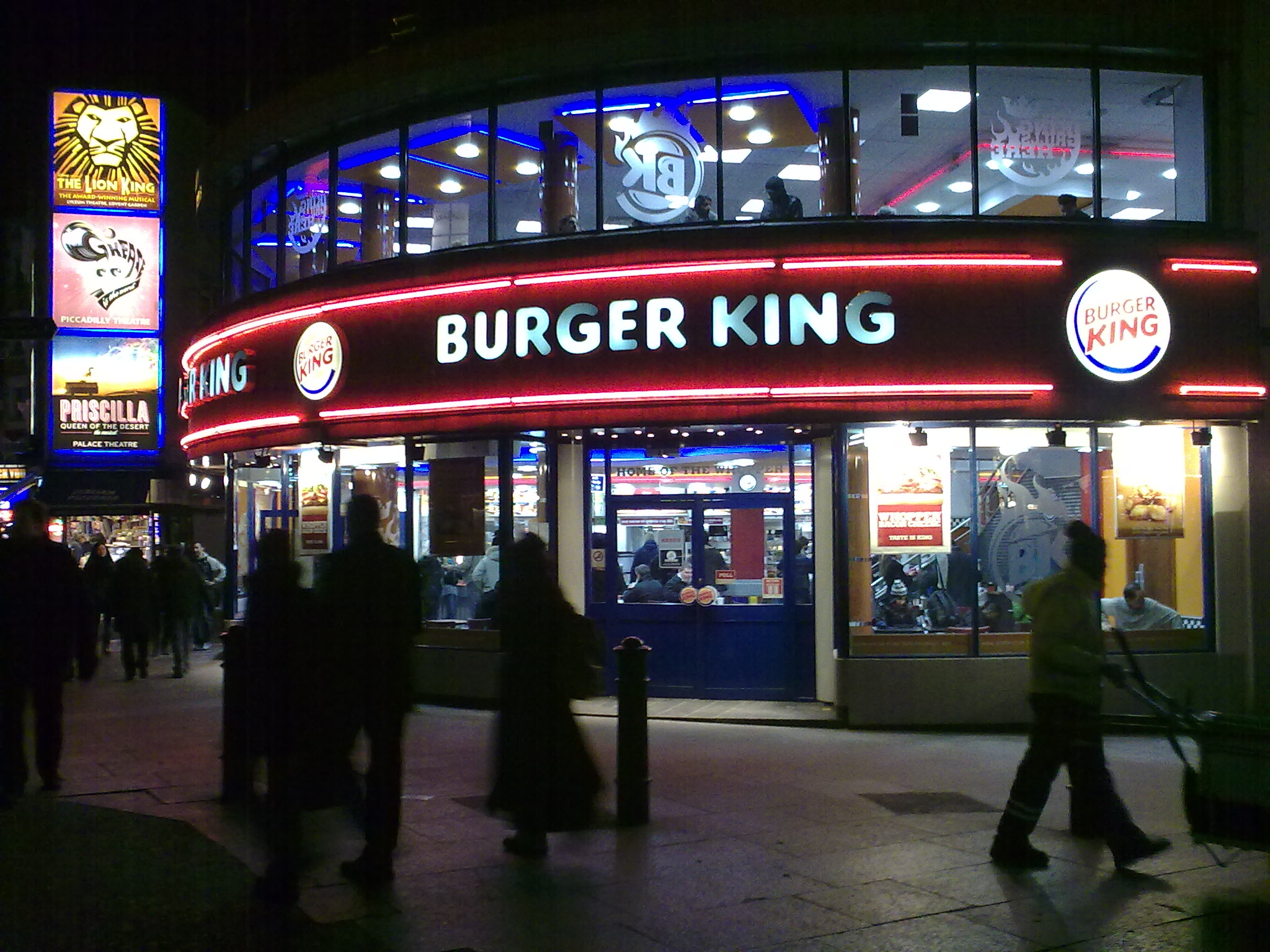
In 2002, Bain acquired Burger King together with TPG Capital and Goldman Sachs Alternatives.

In 2000, DIC Entertainment chairman and CEO Andy Heyward partnered with Bain Capital Inc in a management buyout of DIC from The Walt Disney Company. Heyward continued as chairman and CEO of the animation studio, which has more than 2,500 half-hours of programming in its library. He purchased Bain Capital's interest in 2004 and took the company public the following year.

Bain Capital began the new decade by closing on its seventh fund, Bain Capital Fund VII, with over $3.1 billion of investor commitments. The firm's most notable investments in 2000 included the $700 million acquisition of Datek, sold to TD Ameritrade in 2002, as well as the $305 million acquisition of KB Toys from Consolidated Stores. KB Toys, which had been financially troubled since the 1990s as a result of increased pressure from national discount chains such as Walmart and Target, filed for Chapter 11 bankruptcy protection in January 2004. Bain had been able to recover value on its investment through a dividend recapitalization in 2003. In early 2001, Bain agreed to purchase a 30 percent stake, worth $600 million, in Huntsman Corporation, a leading chemical company owned by Jon Huntsman, Sr., but the deal was never completed.

With a significant amount of committed capital in its new fund available for investment, Bain was one of a handful of private equity investors capable of completing large transactions in the adverse conditions of the early 2000s recession. In July 2002, Bain together with TPG Capital and Goldman Sachs Alternatives, announced the high-profile $2.3 billion leveraged buyout of Burger King from Diageo. However, in November the original transaction collapsed when Burger King failed to meet certain performance targets. In December 2002, Bain and its co-investors agreed on a reduced $1.5 billion purchase price for the investment. The Bain consortium had support from Burger King's franchisees, who controlled approximately 92% of Burger King restaurants at the time of the transaction. Under its new owners, Burger King underwent a major brand overhaul including the use of The Burger King character in advertising. In February 2006, Burger King announced plans for an initial public offering.

In late 2002, Bain remained active acquiring Houghton Mifflin for $1.28 billion, together with Thomas H. Lee Partners and Blackstone. Houghton Mifflin and Burger King represented two of the first large club deals, completed since the collapse of the Dot-com bubble.

In November 2003, Bain completed an investment in Warner Music Group through an acquisition by Edgar Bronfman Jr. In 2004 Bain acquired the Dollarama chain of dollar stores, based in Montreal, Quebec, Canada and operating stores in the provinces of Eastern Canada for $1.05 billion CAD. In March 2004, Bain acquired Brenntag Group from Deutsche Bahn AG (Exited in 2006; sold to BC Partners for $4B). In August 2003, Bain acquired a 50% interest in Bombardier Inc.'s recreational products division, along with the Bombardier family and the Caisse de dépôt et placement du Québec, and created Bombardier Recreational Products or BRP.

=== 2000s buy-out boom ===
In 2004 a consortium comprising KKR, Bain Capital, and real estate development company Vornado Realty Trust announced the $6.6 billion acquisition of Toys "R" Us, the toy retailer. A month earlier, Cerberus Capital Management, made a $5.5 billion offer for both the toy and baby supplies businesses. The Toys 'R' Us buyout was one of the largest in several years. Following this transaction, by the end of 2004 and in 2005, major buyouts were once again becoming common and market observers were stunned by the leverage levels and financing terms obtained by financial sponsors in their buyouts.

The following year, in 2005, Bain was one of seven private equity firms involved in the buyout of SunGard in a transaction valued at $11.3 billion. Bain's partners in the acquisition were Silver Lake Partners, TPG Capital, Goldman Sachs Alternatives, KKR, Providence Equity Partners, and Blackstone. This represented the largest leveraged buyout completed since the takeover of RJR Nabisco at the end of the 1980s, leveraged buyout boom. Also, at the time of its announcement, SunGard would be the largest buyout of a technology company in history, a distinction it would cede to the buyout of Freescale Semiconductor. The SunGard transaction is also notable in the number of firms involved in the transaction, the largest club deal completed to that point. The involvement of seven firms in the consortium was criticized by investors in private equity who considered cross-holdings among firms to be generally unattractive.

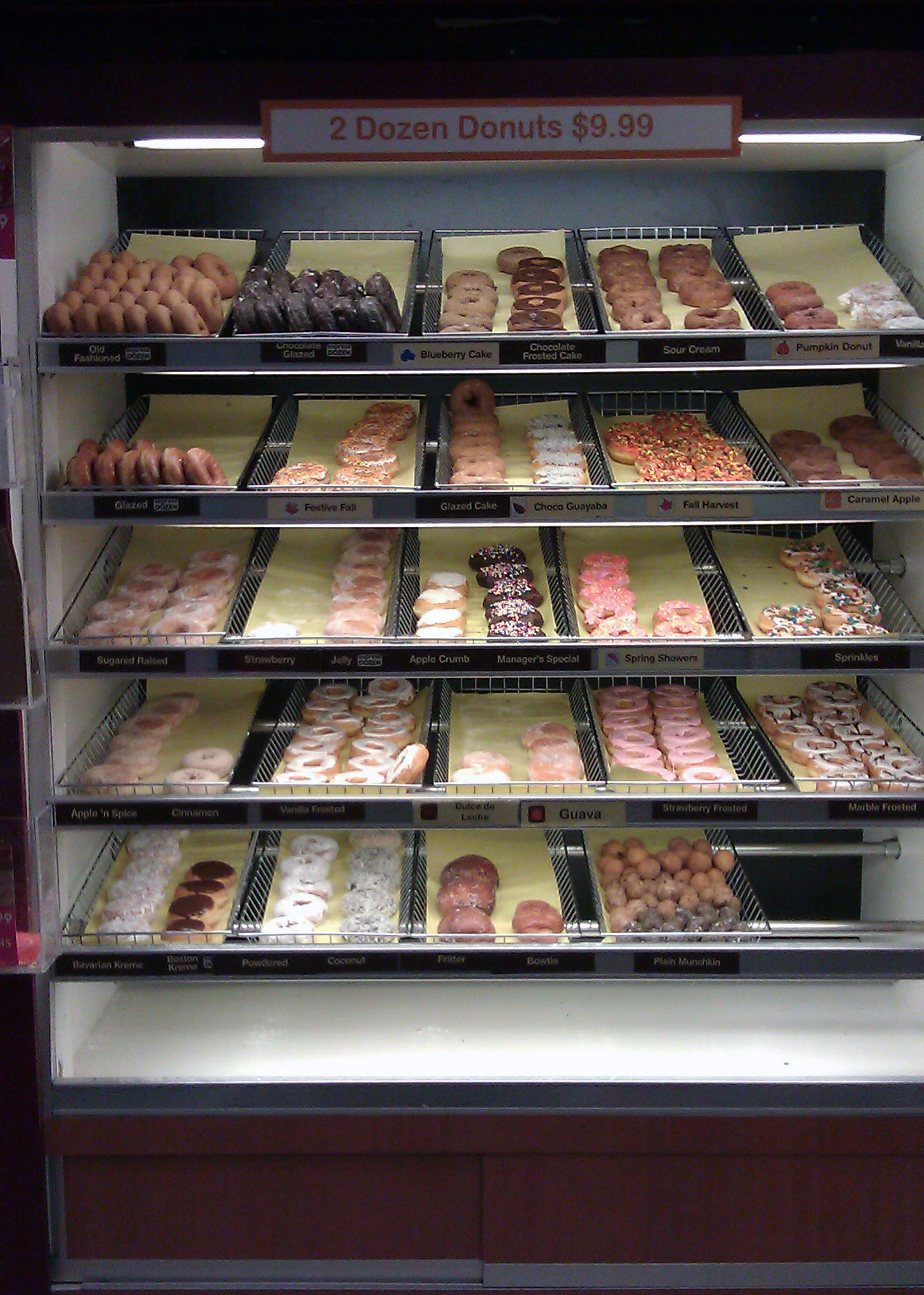
Bain led the buyout of Dunkin' Brands for $2.4 billion in 2005.

Bain led a consortium, together with The Carlyle Group and Thomas H. Lee Partners to acquire Dunkin' Brands. The private equity firms paid $2.425 billion in cash for the parent company of Dunkin' Donuts and Baskin-Robbins in December 2005.

In 2006, Bain Capital and Kohlberg Kravis Roberts, together with Merrill Lynch and the Frist family (which had founded the company) completed a $31.6 billion acquisition of Hospital Corporation of America, 17 years after it was taken private for the first time in a management buyout. At the time of its announcement, the HCA buyout was the first of several to set new records for the largest buyout, eclipsing the 1989 buyout of RJR Nabisco. It was later surpassed by the buyouts of EQ Office and TXU. In August 2006, Bain was part of the consortium, together with Kohlberg Kravis Roberts, Silver Lake Partners, and AlpInvest Partners, that acquired a controlling 80.1% share of semiconductors unit of Philips for €6.4 billion. The new company, based in the Netherlands, was renamed NXP Semiconductors.

During the buyout boom, Bain was active in the acquisition of various retail businesses. In January 2006, Bain announced the acquisition of Burlington Coat Factory, a discount retailer operating 367 department stores in 42 states, in a $2 billion buyout transaction. Six months later, in October 2006, Bain and The Blackstone Group acquired Michaels Stores, the largest arts and crafts retailer in North America in a $6.0 billion leveraged buyout. Bain and Blackstone narrowly beat out Kohlberg Kravis Roberts and TPG Capital in an auction for the company. In June 2007, Bain agreed to acquire HD Supply, the wholesale construction supply business of Home Depot for $10.3 billion. Bain, along with partners Carlyle Group and Clayton, Dubilier & Rice, would later negotiate a lower price ($8.5 billion) when the initial stages of the subprime mortgage crisis caused lenders to seek to renegotiate the terms of the acquisition financing. Just days after the announcement of the HD Supply deal, on June 27, Bain announced the acquisition of Guitar Center, the leading musical equipment retailer in the U.S. Bain paid $1.9 billion, plus $200 million in assumed debt, representing a 26% premium to the stock's closing price prior to the announcement. Bain also acquired Edcon Limited, which operates Edgars Department Stores in South Africa and Zimbabwe for 25 billion rand ($3.5 billion) in February 2007.

Other investments during the buyout boom included: Bavaria Yachtbau, acquired for €1.3 billion in July 2007 as well as Sensata Technologies, acquired from Texas Instruments in 2006 for approximately $3 billion. It is noted that Bain Capital seldom engages in reinvesting in its own companies that ran into difficulties. This was the case with Dade Behring, which was sold after emerging from a bankruptcy.

=== 2008–2023 ===
In July 2008, Bain Capital, together with NBC Universal and Blackstone Group agreed to purchase The Weather Channel from Landmark Communications. The company also partnered with Thomas H. Lee Partners to acquire Clear Channel Communications in July 2008. That same year, Bain Capital acquired D&M Holdings for $442 million.

In June 2009, Bain Capital announced a deal to invest up to $432 million in Chinese electronics manufacturer GOME Electrical Appliances for a stake of up to 23%. In 2010, the company acquired Styron, a division of The Dow Chemical Company, for $1.6 billion, and also acquired Gymboree for $1.8 billion. In 2011, the company, together with Hellman & Friedman, acquired Securitas Direct AB. Hellman & Friedman purchased Bain Capital's remaining stake in Securitas Direct in October 2015.

In 2012, Bain Capital acquired Physio-Control for $478 million, and also acquired a 30% stake in Genpact Ltd., India's largest business process and call center outsourcing firm, for $1 billion. Later that year, the company acquired hand and power tool company Apex Tool Group for roughly $1.6 billion. In May 2013, Bain Capital partnered with investment firms Golden Gate Capital, GIC Private Limited, and Insight Venture Partners to purchase BMC Software for roughly $6.9 billion. In December 2013, the company acquired a majority stake in the clothing chain Canada Goose Inc.

In April 2014, Bain Capital purchased a controlling stake in Viewpoint Construction Software, a construction-specific software company, for $230 million. In November 2014, the company and Virgin Group announced the creation of a new cruise line, which is currently known as Virgin Voyages. Later that year, Bain agreed to purchase four divisions of CRH for roughly $650 million.

In March 2015, Bain Capital agreed to buy Blue Coat Systems for roughly $2.4 billion. In 2016, the firm named Jonathan Lavine and John Connaughton as co-managing partners, and also named Steven Pagliuca and Joshua Bekenstein as co-chairman. In March 2017, Bain Capital agreed to acquire industrial cleaning company Diversey for $3.2 billion. Later that year, Bain partnered with Cinven to take German company Stada Arzneimittel private.

In February 2018, Bain Capital Private Equity agreed to acquire Dutch stroller brand Bugaboo International. In March 2018, Bain Capital purchased a 20% stake in Tower Ltd from Australian financial conglomerate Suncorp. In January 2019, Bain Capital purchased a majority stake in technology consultancy Brillio.

In October 2018, Bain Capital Private Equity and Bain Capital Life Sciences committed $350 million to a new biopharmaceutical company Cerevel Therapeutics. However, only $250 million of the committed amount was drawn. A deal was announced in December 2023 to sell the firm to AbbVie for $8.7 billion which put Bain's 36.5% stake in Cerevel to about $2.7 billion giving a tenfold return on investment.

In June 2020, Bain Capital purchased Virgin Australia. In October 2020, it was reported that the company was negotiating a takeover of UK-based insurance company Liverpool Victoria (LV=). The potential deal could have a value of over £530 million, an amount set to provide a windfall payout to LV='s customers.

In November 2021, the company invested $200 million into Mixpanel. Bain Capital invested in health insurance brokerage firm Enhance Health. On November 5, 2021, it was reported that Bain Capital planned to list Brillio on the NASDAQ, with an IPO of valuation $3 billion or more, including debt. Bain Capital also invested $200 million into When I Work, a scheduling platform created by Drive Capital.

In August 2023, Bain Capital took private Chindata Group Holdings, a data center company based in Beijing, in a deal valued at approximately $3.2 billion.

In December 2023, Infroneer Holdings, a Japanese civil engineering group, had disclosed its intent to acquire Japan Wind Development from Bain Capital for an estimated $1.4 billion.

=== 2024–Present ===
In April 2024, the firm and 11North Partners announced the formation of a partnership for the acquisition and operation of open-air retail centres throughout the US and Canada.

In June 2024, TechCrunch reported Bain Capital was acquiring, and taking private, cloud-based education software vendor PowerSchool, which helps more than 3000 educational institutions "manage operations such as enrollment, grades, attendance and communications with parents and students." On October 1, 2024, Bain announced it had completed the purchase and conversion.

On 14 April 2025, it was announced that Bain Capital had agreed a deal to sell British insurer Esure to Belgian insurer Ageas for €1.510bn.

In March 2025, Bain Capital agreed to acquire the supermarket and specialty store businesses of Seven & i Holdings in Japan.

In November 2025, Bain Capital was reported to have sold a block of shares in Coherent Corp. valued at up to US$1.14 billion.

== Businesses and affiliates ==
Bain Capital's businesses include private equity, venture capital, public equity, and credit. The firm also has specialized businesses focused on impact investing, life sciences and real estate.

=== Bain Capital Private Equity ===
Bain Capital Private Equity has invested across several industries, geographies, and business life cycles. Bain Capital Private Equity also operates in Europe, Australia, and Asia. Historically, Bain Capital has primarily relied on private equity funds, pools of committed capital from pension funds, insurance companies, endowments, fund of funds, high-net-worth individuals, sovereign wealth funds, and other institutional investors. According to the company, Bain Capital's own investment professionals are the largest single investor in each of its funds.

=== Bain Capital Ventures ===
Bain Capital Ventures is the venture capital arm of Bain Capital, focused on seed through late-stage growth equity, investing in business services, consumer, healthcare, internet & mobile, and software companies. Bain Capital Ventures has funded the launch and growth of several companies, including DocuSign, Jet.com, Lime, LinkedIn, Rent the Runway, SendGrid, and SurveyMonkey.

=== Bain Capital Public Equity ===
Originally founded as Brookside Capital, Bain Capital Public Equity is the public equity affiliate of Bain Capital. Established in October 1996, Bain Capital Public Equity's primary objective is to invest in securities of publicly traded companies that offer opportunities to realize substantial long-term capital appreciation. Bain Capital Public Equity employs a long/short equity strategy to reduce market risk in the portfolio.

=== Bain Capital Credit ===
Originally founded as Sankaty Advisors, Bain Capital Credit is the fixed income affiliate of Bain Capital, a manager of high yield debt securities. With approximately $49 billion of assets under management, Bain Capital Credit invests in a wide variety of securities, including leveraged loans, high-yield bonds, distressed securities, mezzanine debt, convertible bonds, structured products, and equity investments. In 2017, Bain Capital Credit closed its first credit fund in Asia, focusing on distressed debt in the region. Bain Capital Credit has also pursued distressed debt strategies in Europe. In November 2018, Bain Capital Credit took Specialty Finance, a business development company, public through an IPO.

=== Bain Capital Double Impact ===
Bain Capital Double Impact focuses on impact investing with companies that provide financial returns as well as social and environmental impact. In 2015, Bain Capital hired Deval Patrick, former Massachusetts Governor, to lead the new business division. Bain Capital Double Impact closed its initial fund of $390 million in July 2017. In March 2019, it was reported that Bain Capital Double Impact had acquired a majority stake in IT outsourcing firm Rural Sourcing. In June 2019, the company sold Impact Fitness to Morgan Stanley Capital Partners.

=== Bain Capital Life Sciences ===
Bain Capital Life Sciences invests in companies that focus on medical innovation and serve patients with unmet medical needs. It raised its first fund of $720 million in May 2017. In September 2019, SpringWorks, a biopharmaceutical company Bain Capital Life Sciences owns a 17% stake in, launched an IPO. Also in 2019, the company closed two life sciences portfolios, in Cambridge, Massachusetts, and in the Research Triangle in North Carolina.

=== Bain Capital Real Estate ===
Bain Capital Real Estate was founded in 2018 when Harvard Management Company shifted the management of its real estate investment portfolio to Bain Capital. The Bain Capital Real Estate team is managed by members of Harvard Management Company's former real estate team. Bain Capital Real Estate closed an initial fund of $1.5 billion in July 2019.

=== Bain Capital Tech Opportunities ===
Bain Capital Tech Opportunities was created in 2019 to make investments in technology companies, particularly in enterprise software and cybersecurity.

=== Bain Capital Insurance ===
Bain Capital created a dedicated insurance‑industry investing business inside Bain Capital in 2021. Recent acquisitions by this unit include the 2025 agreement to acquire Jensten Group, a UK-based commercial insurance distribution platform.

=== Bain Capital Special Situations ===
Bain Capital Special Situations is a business unit focused on providing flexible capital solutions across asset classes, including investments in distressed assets, hybrid equity and debt, and real-asset transactions. In 2023, the firm was reported to be seeking approximately US$4 billion for a new global special situations fund.

== Appraisals and critiques ==
Bain Capital's approach of applying consulting expertise to the companies it invested in became widely copied in the private equity industry. University of Chicago Booth School of Business economist Steven Kaplan said in 2011, that the firm "came up with a model that was very successful and very innovative and that now everybody uses."

In his 2009 book The Buyout of America: How Private Equity Is Destroying Jobs and Killing the American Economy, Josh Kosman described Bain Capital as "notorious for its failure to plough profits back into its businesses," being the first large private-equity firm to derive a large fraction of its revenues from corporate dividends and other distributions. The revenue potential of this strategy, which may "starve" a company of capital, was increased by a 1970s court ruling that allowed companies to consider the entire fair market value of the company, instead of only their "hard assets", in determining how much money was available to pay dividends. In at least some instances, companies acquired by Bain borrowed money in order to increase their dividend payments, ultimately leading to the collapse of what had been financially stable businesses.

== Bibliography ==
- Kosman, Josh (2009). The Buyout of America: How Private Equity Is Destroying Jobs and Killing the American Economy. Portfolio Hardcover. ISBN 978-1591843696.
- Kranish, Michael; Helman, Scott (2012). The Real Romney. New York: HarperCollins. ISBN 978-0-06-212327-5.
