= PLS Logistics =

American logistics provider

- Company type: Privately held company
- Industry: Logistics
- Founded: 1991; 35 years ago
- Headquarters: Cranberry Township, Butler County, Pennsylvania, United States
- Number of locations: 10 sales offices (2016)
- Key people: Gregory Burns (CEO), Joe Bielawski (COO)
- Number of employees: 500 (2017)
- Website: www.plslogistics.com

PLS Logistics Service (PLS) is an American third-party logistics company in the metal, lumber, and building industries. Headquartered in Cranberry Township, Pennsylvania, a suburb of Pittsburgh, PLS Logistics Services provides freight transportation, logistics, and technology services for businesses. PLS serves a variety of companies, including suppliers, producers, wholesalers, service centers, and end-users.

As of 2021, PLS managed more than 1 million loads annually throughout the U.S., Canada, and Mexico via all major freight modes: full truckload, LTL, rail, barge, air, ocean, and intermodal.

== History ==
PLS was founded in 1991 as Pittsburgh Logistics Systems to transport steel for industrial companies. Later renamed PLS Logistics Services, the company has expanded its services to many other industries yet remains the largest industrial-focused third-party logistics (3PL).

PLS Logistics originally started in the metal and mining industries, supporting the need of the steel industry in Pittsburgh, Pennsylvania. They then expanded into retail, food and beverage, consumer packaged goods (CPG), oil and gas, heavy haul, building, and construction industries. PLS Logistics has also transported military supplies and government freight.

== Operations ==
PLS’s transportation options include less than truckload (LTL), full truckload (FTL), rail, air, ocean, intermodal, refrigerated, flatbed, specialized and oversized loads, and expedited shipping services. On average, PLS Logistics moves 3,000 shipments daily in North America.
