= Brad Pattelli =

Businessman

Brad Pattelli is a former vice president of Angelo, Gordon & Co, an arbitrage firm headquartered in New York City, New York. He most recently served as President of LC Advisors, a subsidiary of Lending Club, an online platform for investing in personal loans.

Pattelli was the managing director on several of Angelo, Gordon & Co.'s investments in the largest newspaper bankruptcies across the country. He headed Angelo, Gordon & Co.'s efforts into becoming one of the main secured creditors in the bankruptcies of the Tribune Co., parent company of the Los Angeles Times and Chicago Tribune; Minneapolis' Star Tribune; as well as Philadelphia Newspapers L.L.C., parent company of The Philadelphia Inquirer and the Philadelphia Daily News.

== Early life and education ==
Pattelli holds a bachelor's degree from the University of Notre Dame and earned an M.B.A. degree from Columbia Business School. Brad grew up in Hennepin County, Illinois; his father was a steelworker at the local rolling mill.

== Career ==
Pattelli has formerly served on the board of directors for Dade Behring Holdings, and Thermadyne Holdings Corporation. He is currently on the board of directors for American Media Operations, Inc., a major publisher of supermarket tabloids in the United States.
