= Kansas City Bolt and Nut Company plant =

Industrial plant

Coordinates: 39°6′14.65″N 94°29′56.07″W

Kansas City Bolt and Nut Company was a diverse steel parts manufacturing plant in Kansas City, Missouri that through its successors at its peak in the 1950s employed more than 4,500 people.

The plant started in 1888. In 1925 it was acquired by Sheffield Steel Corporation with its variety of products and was billed as a department store of the steel industry with a more diversified line of products than any mill in the country." It was located near the confluence of the Missouri River and Blue River (Missouri) in Kansas City's Northeast Industrial District. The company was the first manufacturer to go into the district and within 10 years 30 other manufacturers followed it with the enclaves adopting the English industrial town names of Sheffield, Leeds, Birmingham and Manchester as levees were built to protect it.

It was acquired by Armco Steel in 1930 which expanded it in 1945. At its peak it was one of Kansas City's largest employers with more than 4,500 employees. Operating as Armco Worldwide Grinding System, it was sold in 1993 to GS Technologies which then became GST Steel Company. In 1997 the plant had a 10-week strike. It closed in February 2001 with the layoff of 750 employees.

The closing of the company (plant) drew considerable attention in the 2012 U.S. Presidential election because of scrutiny of the business dealings of Mitt Romney who had founded Bain Capital which had acquired controlling interest of GST Steel in 1993 for $24.5 million.

Romney had left Bain in 1999 before the bankruptcy. Employees noted that Bain had loaded the company with debt while earning profits ($58.4 million). At the time of its bankruptcy it said it owed $553.9 million in debts against $395.2 million in assets. In 2002 it was revealed the company had underfunded the pension for employees by $44 million. GS Steel derives its name from Georgetown Steel which operates a steel plant in Georgetown, South Carolina. The South Carolina and Missouri operations were combined by Bain. The South Carolina plant closed in 2003. That plant reopened in 2003 with a different owner (International Steel Group) later Mittal Steel and later ArcelorMittal. During the 2012 U.S. Presidential election laid off plant worker Joe Soptic was featured in an advertisement against Romney claiming that his wife died of cancer after he lost his health insurance in the closing. The ad stated "When Mitt Romney and Bain closed the plant, I lost my healthcare, and my family lost their healthcare. And a short time after that my wife became ill." An investigation by The Washington Post showed that Soptic's wife had died of cancer in 2006 five years after the plant closed and that she had her own health insurance at the time of the closing but lost it after she left that job in 2002.

== External links and further reading ==
- "Obama ad claims Romney, Bain left misery in wake of GST Steel takeover"
