= Collabera =

Information technology consulting company

Collabera Inc
- Type: Private
- Industry: Information Technology
- Founded: 1991
- Headquarters: Basking Ridge, New Jersey, United States
- Number of locations: 60 +
- Services: IT Services, Enterprise Software
- Revenue: ▲US$ 1.2 Billion (2021)
- Number of employees: 16,000 +
- Website: www.collabera.com

Collabera Inc is a company that provides information technology consulting. Its North American headquarters is in Basking Ridge, New Jersey, while the Asia Pacific headquarters is in Vadodara, Gujarat India. Collabera is the largest privately held technology company in New Jersey, by revenue, with $525 million in revenue for 2015 and approximately 4,200 employees throughout their New Jersey offices.

== History ==
The company was founded in 1991 as Global Consultants, Inc. (GCI). The company was purchased by Hiten Patel And Sham Patel in 1996, when it had $2 million in revenue. Collabera had $520 million in revenue in 2014. In 2007, GCI began a series of company acquisitions, including IVL India (for SAP services), Planet Asia, and Blue Hammock (for strategic consulting). In 2008, GCI changed its name to Collabera.

In 2012, Collabera built a third development center (along with existing ones in Bangalore and Trivandrum) named "Collabera House" in Vadodara, India, with plans to open another in the country. The following year, Raj Mamodia was appointed as CEO. Then, in 2014, Collabera's IT services formed a subsidiary company Brillio, headed by Mamodia, and Hiten Patel resumed his previous role as CEO.

On July 1, 2020, Karthik Krishnamurthy became CEO.

On Aug 11,2022 Collabera has formed another subsidiary company Ascendion and appointed a new CEO, Mike Fromhold, for its staffing arm, Collabera LLC.

== YouTube content moderation ==
The video sharing website YouTube has used Collabera as a contractor to hire content moderators, who review videos to determine if their content violates YouTube's content policies. A September 2020 lawsuit filed against YouTube included reports by a former Collabera employee who said that she was given little to no mental health training or support and made to sign an NDA before being shown examples of content that appears in the review queues. She reported being made to regularly exceed YouTube's stated limited of four hours per day of viewing graphic content.
