= Steven Kaplan (economist) =

American economist (born 1959)

Steven Neil Kaplan
- Born: 1959 (age 66–67)
- Education: A.B. Harvard College; PhD Harvard University
- Occupation: Economist
- Spouse: Carol Jane Rubin
- Parent: Leonard Kaplan

Steven Neil Kaplan (born 1959) is the Neubauer Family Distinguished Service Professor of Entrepreneurship and Finance at the University of Chicago Booth School of Business. He started teaching at the business school in 1988, and was named Neubauer Professor in 1999. He is also the Kessenich Faculty director of the Polsky Center for Entrepreneurship, at the university.

== Early life and education ==
Kaplan received his AB, summa cum laude, in applied mathematics and economics from Harvard College in 1981 and earned a PhD in business economics from Harvard University in 1988.

== Teaching ==
Kaplan teaches advanced courses in corporate finance and entrepreneurial finance. His areas of expertise are: Venture Capital, Corporate Governance, Private Equity, Mergers and Acquisitions, Boards of Directors, and E-Commerce. He was named one of the top twelve business school teachers in U.S., Business Week, 1994, and one of the top four business school entrepreneurship professors in U.S., Business Week, 1996.

== Professional work ==
In 2001, he was visiting professor at INSEAD, in Fontainebleau, France. He is a research associate at the National Bureau of Economic Research,

He was an associate editor of Journal of Finance until 2000, the Journal of Financial Economics until 2021, and is an associate editor of European Financial Management. In 2025, he was elected as a Fellow of the American Finance Association.

On Google Scholar, Kaplan has over 56,000 citations as of March 2026.

== Personal life ==
He grew up in Danbury, Connecticut. In 1989, he married Carol Jane Rubin, the daughter of Louis Rubin, vice president of National Westminster Bank USA, in a ceremony in New York, New York.

== Publications ==
- “Private Equity Performance: Returns, Persistence and Capital Flows,” with Antoinette Schoar, Journal of Finance, Volume 60, August 2005.
- “Characteristics, Contracts, and Actions: Evidence From Venture Capitalist Analyses,” with Per Strömberg. Journal of Finance, Volume 59, October 2004, 2177–2210.
- “What is the Price of Hubris? Using Takeover Battles to Infer Overpayments and Synergies,” with Pekka Hietala and David T. Robinson, Financial Management, Volume 32, Number 3, Autumn, 2003. Awarded Addison-Wesley Prize for 2nd Best Paper in Autumn, 2002 to Summer, 2004 issues.
- “The State of U.S. Corporate Governance: What’s Right and What’s Wrong?” (with Bengt Holmstrom), Journal of Applied Corporate Finance, Spring 2003, 8-20.
- “Financial Contracting Theory Meets the Real World: Evidence From Venture Capital Contracts,” with Per Strömberg, Review of Economic Studies, Volume 70, April 2003, 281–316.
- “The Effects of Business-to-Business E-Commerce on Transaction Costs,” with Luis Garicano, Journal of Industrial Economics, December, 2001, 463–485.

He is editor of "Mergers and Productivity,"(National Bureau of Economic Research, 2000)
