= James S. McDonnell Planetarium =

Planetarium in Missouri, US

- James S. McDonnell Planetarium
- Established: April 16, 1963
- Location: Forest Park, St. Louis, Missouri, US
- Coordinates: 38.631287°N 90.270881°W
- Type: Planetarium
- Architect: Gyo Obata
- Owner: Academy of Science, St. Louis
- Website: slsc.org/attraction/mcdonnell-planetarium

The James S. McDonnell Planetarium, formerly the St. Louis Planetarium, is a planetarium in St. Louis, Missouri, located in Forest Park. Originally its own fixture, it is part of the Saint Louis Science Center. Opened in 1963, it was a popular St. Louis attraction. It declined in the 1970s, eventually being bought by the Academy of Science, St. Louis in 1984.

The planetarium is free admission. It is ranked No. 2 in USA Today's 10Best Readers' Choice Awards for best planetarium.

== Architecture ==
The building is 72 feet (22 m) tall. It has white concrete walls that are between 3 inches (7.6 cm) and 3.5 inches (8.9 cm) thick, with exception to the base and the roof's peak. Twelve columns surround the perimeter to hold the roof up. Its roof is a hyperboloid.

The building's design has been received positively. Its roof has described as an "inverted tea cup" and a "good bird bath". The Brunswicker said the roof "suggested the vast reaches of the universe". Architectural Forum described the building as "looking like some strange craft spun down to earth from outer space". Among architects, it was praised in a St. Louis architecture contest in 1964. They described it was a "landmark" that "can hold its own with any building wherever it is at whatever time it was built". Writing for the St. Louis Post-Dispatch, E. F. Porter Jr. called it "one of St. Louis's most prominent and most striking landmarks".

In 1965, it was proposed that a Foucault pendulum be added to the planetarium. The city estimated the cost at $12,000, but the only bid was of $27,000, from Shamrock Engineering. In 1978, an $8,000,000 underground facility was proposed in the area between the planetarium and the Saint Louis Zoo, with both jointly owning the facility.

In 1984, the planetarium closed for renovations amid its consolidation with the Museum of Science and Natural History. The renovations cost $3,000,000. It added a walkway over Interstate 64, connecting the planetarium with the Saint Louis Science Center, as well as new exhibits as part of a "Discovery Room" in the building's lower level.

Plans to again expand the science center were proposed in 1987, with renovations beginning in 1989. The planetarium remained open throughout its renovations, fully reopening on November 2, 1991.

== Projector room and equipment ==
The projector room – called the Star Chamber – is located on the first floor. It is 160 feet (49 m) in diameter and seats 408 people. Its roof is domed with aluminum. Earlier designs lacked headrests for the seats because it would reduce the seat count and the headrests were not universal, which led to some neck injuries. Following the consolidation with the Museum of Science and Natural History, its projector room was renovated, with more comfortable seating being added. The projector room's floor was also raised 2 ft 8 in (0.81 m), bringing attendees closer to the ceiling.

The planetarium's first projector and sound system cost $176,000, the projected being built by Soto, a Tokyo-based manufacturing company. It weighed 16,000 pounds (7,300 kg) and, as Schweighauser described it, "the most complex machine of its kind ever built for a planetarium". Nobody in St. Louis knew how to operate it, so a company representative had to visit the planetarium in order to teach staff members. It has been described as looking like a "monster", a "grasshopper", and a "dumbbell".

In 1964, the projector faced slight defects which would "not be noticed by the average layman"; the defects were fixed by two technicians over the course of nine months. In 1967, it purchased several panorama projectors, for $1,000 each. In 1972, McDonnell gifted $100,000 to the planetarium. With the gift, it purchased five wide-view projectors, a panorama projector, special effects projectors, maintenance for the Soto projector, and improvements to the sound system.

In 1982, the James S. McDonnell Foundation gifted the planetarium $600,000 to purchase a new Digistar projector, with it being the first time it used computerized projection. In 1983, the planetarium offered the old projector for $150,000, advertising it in The New York Times, The Wall Street Journal, and various scientific publications.

In 2001, the planetarium installed a UNIVERSARIUM Mark IX Zeiss Star Projector, which was one of three in the United States and of thirteen in the world. As of 2026, it is a hybrid planetarium, meaning it uses lasers to accurately project a star map onto a screen. According to PR Newswire, it is the largest and most advanced planetarium of its kind in the United States. As of July 16, 2026, it operates a GOTO Chiron III Hybrid Star Projector, which, according to PR Newswire, is the first of its kind to be installed in the United States. It also offers telescopes for public use.

== History ==
=== 1954: 1962: Planning and construction ===
In 1954, Howard C. Ohlendorf, a head of a local dental supply firm, made the first proposals for a science institution in St. Louis. He and his supporters organized the Planetarium Forming Group. Planning for the planetarium began in 1955, when the St. Louis government set aside part of a bond issue for a planetarium as part of a larger museum complex. It was supported by St. Louis voters, but was not prioritized due to not being the highest-voted item on the ballot. After the onset of the Space Race, the demand for a planetarium grew.

In March 1958, the first proposed location, the north side of Forest Park, was chosen; it was later abandoned due to zoning issues. In September, the final location was chosen, at the southeastern section of the park. The building was designed by Gyo Obata of HOK, who was given the project in February 1958. Chester Roemer, HOK's vice-president, serving as project architect. The groundbreaking occurred in August 1960, being officiated by Mayor Raymond Tucker and businessman James Smith McDonnell. The planetarium cost $1,200,000 to build, with $200,000 of the cost being paid off by a grant from McDonnell.

=== 1963–1982: City ownership ===
Its opening was planned for April 6, 1963, but was delayed to April 16, as nobody knew how to work the projector. It was originally known as the St. Louis Planetarium. Its first director was Charles A. Schweighauser; he resigned on November 25, 1965, being succeeded by his assistant, Ronald R. Sutherland. Within six weeks of its opening, it received more than 50,000 visitors. In May 1963, McDonnell gifted another $400,000 to fund an educational program. On May 1, 1964, it was renamed to the James S. McDonnell Planetarium.

On March 24, 1962, the planetarium recorded its 500,000th visitor. In January 1965, a $4,600 shortage was discovered in its accounts; the accountant who was in charge was not fired until March. Alderman John Sartorius accused the shortage of being covered up in that time, in order to make Tucker look better. In the 1960s, its budget exceeded $150,000. On October 23, 1967, Deseret News described it as a "national resource center" for planetaria. Also in 1967, McDonnell presented a $670,000 fund for the planetarium. Until 1970, famous scientists were hosted as lecturers, such as Harlow Shapley, Edward Teller, and Harold Urey. In the early 1970s, it had 250,000 visitors annually. In 1972, it displayed the Gemini 8 spacecraft. In 1973, it presented a star show based on a short story written by Isaac Asimov.

In 1971, the planetarium had a debt of $86,000, with its closure being threatened due to a budget cut from the St. Louis government. Some pushes for donations were tried. In the end, the planetarium submitted a new budget and laid off four employees. Its decline in visits was blamed on a false report which stated that the planetarium had permanently closed.

Entering into the 1980s, attendance declined, as part of a nationwide trend of decreasing attendance to planetariums. Shows and presentations unrelated to science, such as the nightly entertainment show "Laserium", began being shown in order to generate revenue. The amount of shows and exhibits declined, rotating around four times per year. Between spring 1974 and November 1982, the planetarium's staff included zero experienced astronomers. Some blamed the St. Louis government for neglecting the planetarium, while others blamed Sutherland's management, describing it as "sloppy". Under Sutherland, the planetarium was "Kafkaesque", consistently being delayed in its payments, such that local newspapers refused to run paid promotions for it without an upfront payment. At one point, $2,000 had gone unaccounted for and tickets were lost, with reports about drug dealing occurring in its parking lot.

In 1982, the planetarium was proposed for receiving an extra $800,000 in tax allocation. In April 1983, voters passed a budget increase. However, in October, its budget was reduced by 68%.

=== 1982–present: Ownership under the Academy of Science, St. Louis ===
In 1977, it was proposed that the Museum of Science and Natural History be moved to beside the planetarium, with the two institutions being consolidated. The proposal was not accepted due to crowding Forest Park with buildings and bringing more traffic. In January 1981, the area surrounding the planetarium being zoned as a development zone by the master plan, with construction restrictions being proposed. By 1982, the proposal regained support, including from mayor Vincent C. Schoemehl and county executive Gene McNary. The planetarium was declining in popularity, and the museum was denied expansions in its previously space of Oak Knoll Park. It was opposed by the Coalition for the Environment, though support outweighed, and the bill to do so was passed by the Missouri General Assembly.

In January 1984, the Academy of Science, St. Louis purchased the planetarium from the city. It closed in October of the same year for renovations. It reopened on July 20, 1985, as a consolidated part of the science center.
