= Clayton, Missouri =

City in Missouri, U.S.

- City
- City of Clayton
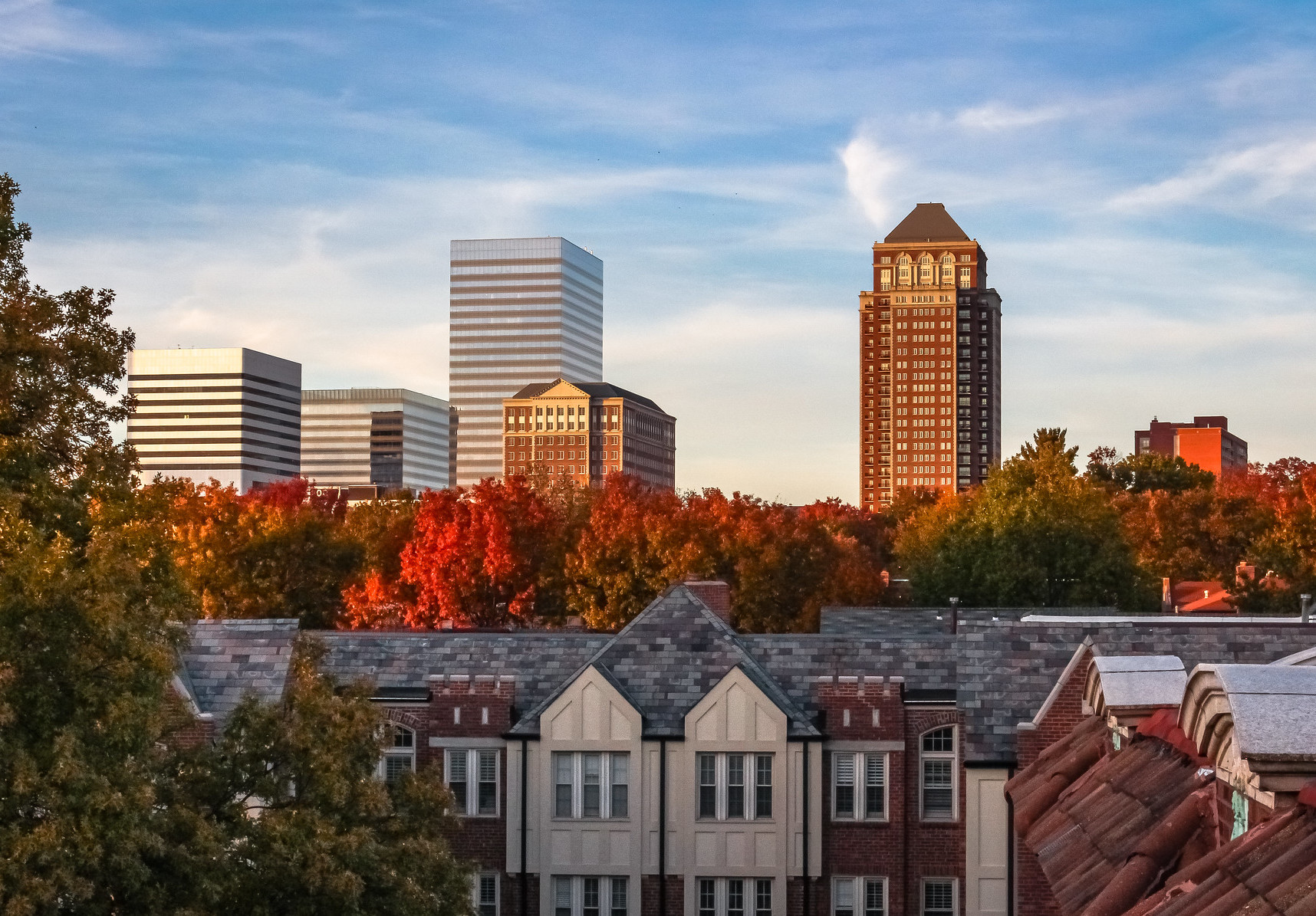
- Clayton high-rises seen from the Moorlands

- Logo

- Location in Missouri

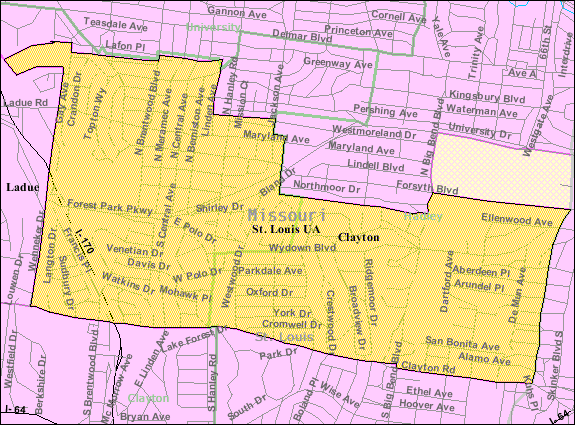
- U.S. Census Map
- Coordinates: 38°38′40″N 90°19′49″W
- Country: United States
- State: Missouri
- County: St. Louis
- Townships: Clayton, Hadley
- Settled: 1877
- Incorporated: 1913

Government
  - Type: Mayor-council city
  - Mayor: Bridget McAndrew

Area
  - Total: 2.51 sq mi (6.49 km^{2})
  - Land: 2.51 sq mi (6.49 km^{2})
  - Water: 0 sq mi (0.00 km^{2})
- Elevation: 551 ft (168 m)

Population (2020)
  - Total: 17,355
  - Density: 6,919.9/sq mi (2,671.8/km^{2})
- Time zone: UTC−6 (Central)
  - Summer (DST): UTC−5 (Central)
- ZIP Code: 63105
- Area code: 314
- FIPS code: 29-14572
- GNIS feature ID: 2393548
- Website: City of Clayton

Clayton is a city in and the county seat of St. Louis County, Missouri, United States, that borders the west side of the independent city of St. Louis. The population was 17,355 at the 2020 census. Organized in 1877, the city was named after Ralph Clayton, a citizen who donated the land for the St. Louis County courthouse.

== Geography ==
=== Cityscape ===
The architecture of central Clayton reflects its economic activity and eras of growth. An impressive collection of mid-century modern low and high rise structures contrast with earlier mansions, stores and flats. Its surrounding residential neighborhoods maintain a dense, walkable character and were largely developed in the pre-war era. These neighborhoods consist of brick walkups, apartment buildings, mansions and modest single family homes centered around several small business districts.

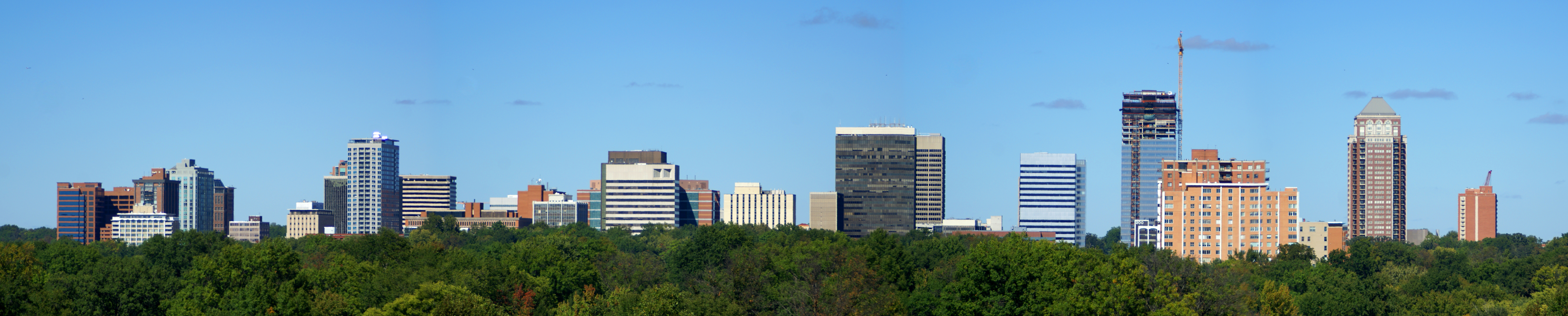
View of Clayton skyline in 2018

=== Neighborhoods ===
==== Claverach Park ====
Claverach Park is a residential neighborhood bounded by Wydown Boulevard on the north, Ridgemoor Drive and Big Bend Boulevard on the east, Clayton Road on the south, and Audubon Drive on the west. The neighborhood was planned in the early 1920s by Julius Pitzman who avoided a traditional street grid in favor of curvilinear streets lined by stately trees, one centrally located neighborhood park, and 9 pocket parks. Oak Knoll Park, Clayton's second largest park and the former home to the St. Louis Academy of Science, is located in the neighborhood.

==== Clayshire ====
Clayshire is a suburban neighborhood bounded by Forest Park Parkway on the north, Interstate 170 on the east, Clayton Road on the south and the Ladue city limit to the west and includes the subdivision of Tanglewood. Unlike Clayton's denser pre-war residential neighborhoods, Clayshire is characterized by a more post-war suburban development pattern. Neighborhood parks include Anderson Park, Clayshire Park, and Whitburn Park as well as a pedestrian underpass beneath I-170 that connects to Shaw Park. There is a small commercial area at the intersection of Clayton Road and Brentwood Boulevard.

==== Davis Place ====
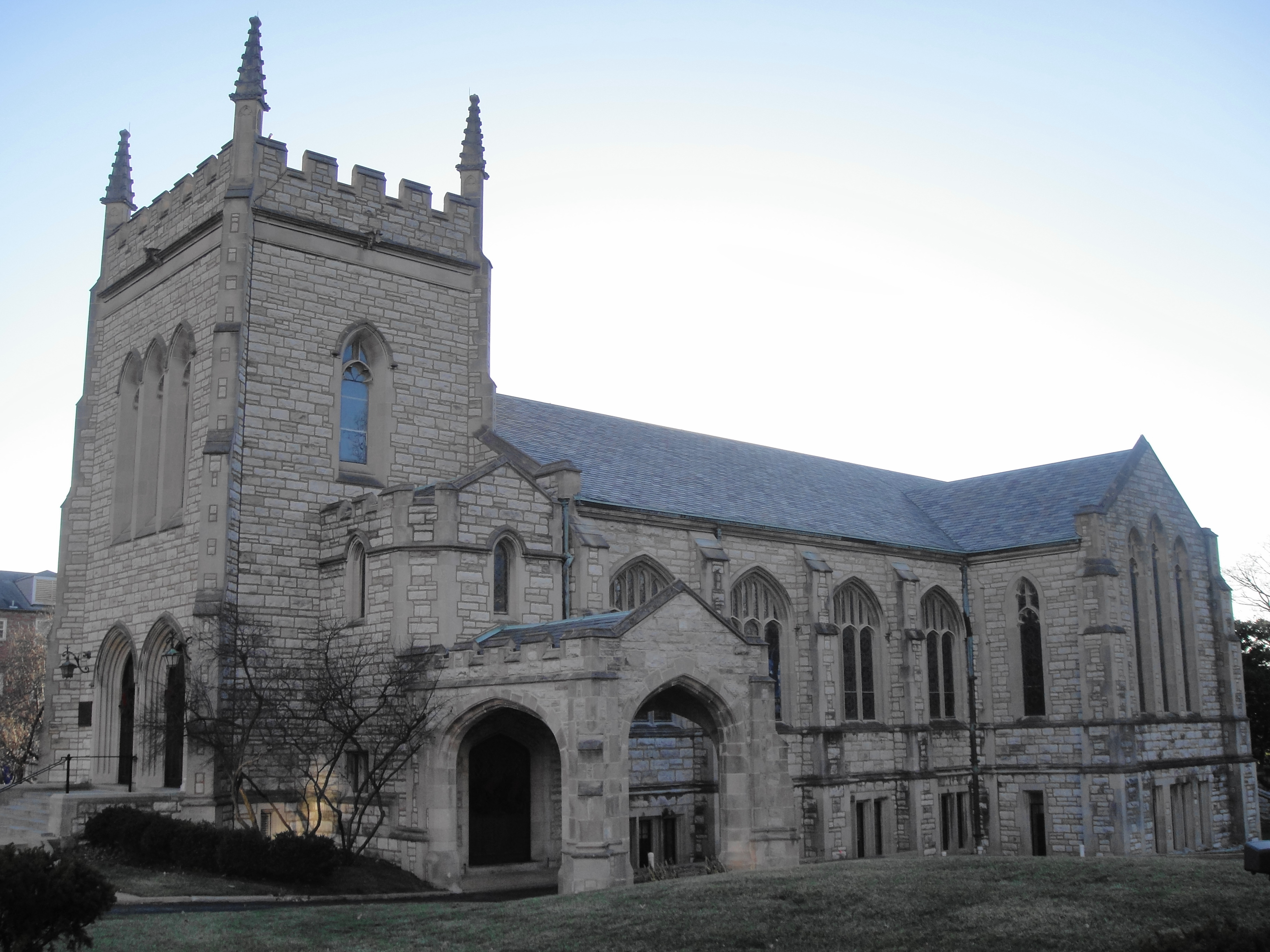
Central Presbyterian Church in the Davis Place neighborhood

A large residential neighborhood, Davis Place is characterized primarily by single family homes with some apartment buildings along Hanley Road and Brentwood Boulevard. Its boundaries are Forest Park Parkway on the north, Hanley Road on the east, Clayton Road on the south, and Brentwood Boulevard on the west. The neighborhood includes the subdivisions Country Club Place, Country Club Court, and Remmerts. Davis Place is also home to the Shops of Clayton commercial corridor along Clayton Road.

==== DeMun ====
Part of the Hi-Pointe–DeMun Historic District, DeMun is primarily a residential neighborhood on the eastern edge of Clayton. It is a dense and walkable neighborhood characterized by brick and limestone pre-war apartment blocks, single family homes and small commercial areas centered around DeMun Avenue and Clayton Road. The neighborhood is also home to Concordia Seminary, the South Campus of Washington University, and three public parks (Concordia, DeMun, and Henry Wright).

The boundaries of DeMun in Clayton are Concordia Seminary's northern property line and Northwood Avenue, the St. Louis city limit to the east, Clayton Road to the south, and Big Bend Boulevard to the west.

==== Downtown Clayton ====
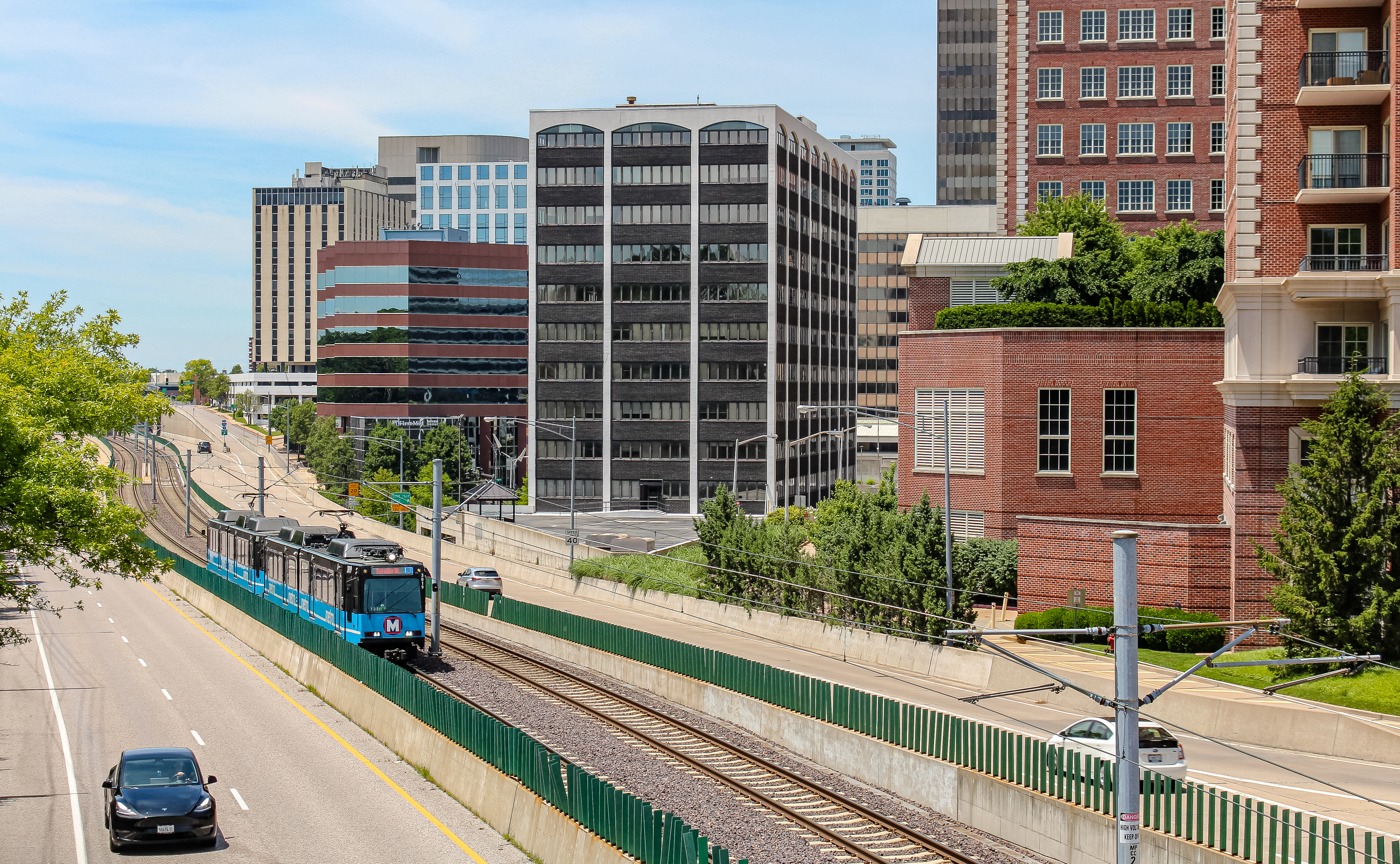
MetroLink passing by downtown Clayton

Downtown Clayton is the seat of St. Louis County government and home to its headquarters campus. The neighborhood is home to three of the St. Louis region's seven Fortune 500 headquarters; Centene Corporation, Emerson Electric, and Graybar. Additionally, the neighborhood is home to four of the region's seven Fortune 1000 headquarters; Advantage Solutions, Caleres, Energizer Holdings, and Olin Corporation. Commerce Bank, the Regional Business Council and the St. Louis Club are located here as well. Downtown Clayton is known for its many restaurants and cafes and hosts the St. Louis Art Fair during September each year. Recently, the neighborhood has entered a period of significant redevelopment and new construction with the opening of the Two Twelve Clayton and Ceylon apartment buildings in 2017, Centene Plaza C in 2019, and Forsyth Pointe in 2023. As of 2022, downtown Clayton had seven projects, worth approximately $600 million, either in development or under construction.

The boundaries of downtown Clayton are Maryland Avenue on the north, the University City limit on the east, Forest Park Parkway on the south, and Brentwood Boulevard on the west. The neighborhood is served by MetroLink via the Blue Line at the Clayton and Forsyth stations.

==== Moorlands ====
Like Clayton's other urban, walkable neighborhoods, the Moorlands is characterized by large, pre-war masonry apartment buildings and single family homes with high-rise apartment buildings along Hanley Road and a small commercial district at the intersection of Hanley and Wydown Boulevard. Most of the single family homes are concentrated east of Glenridge Drive while most of the apartment buildings are concentrated to the west. The neighborhood's boundaries are Wydown Boulevard on the north, Audubon Drive on the east, Clayton Road on the south, and Hanley Road on the west.

==== North Clayton ====
North Clayton is a dense, walkable set of neighborhoods that encompass all of Clayton north of Maryland Avenue. The area is mostly made up of single family homes with office, apartment and condo buildings located primarily between Meramec Avenue and Brentwood Boulevard. Commercial corridors include Meramec and Maryland avenues. The neighborhood is home to Kol Rinah synagogue, St. Joseph Catholic Church, the Mid County branch of the St. Louis County Library, and Centene's corporate training center. Neighborhood parks include Taylor Park and Hanley Park which includes the historic Hanley House.

Subdivisions within North Clayton include the Bemiston additions, Clayton Gardens, Colonial Park, Hanley Place, and Maryland Terrace. Its boundaries to the north and east are the city limits with University City, its southern boundary is Maryland Avenue, and its western boundary is the Ladue city limit.

==== Other neighborhoods ====
Other neighborhoods and subdivisions within Clayton include Brentmoor and Brentmoor Park, Carrswold, Ellenwood, Forest Ridge, Hillcrest, Parkside, Skinker Heights, Southmoor, Tesson, Tuscany Park, Wydown Forest, and Wydown Terrace.

== Demographics ==
In the St. Louis region, Clayton is well known for housing a wealthy, educated, professional, and often dual-income population.

=== Racial and ethnic composition ===
Clayton city, Missouri – Racial and ethnic composition Note: the US Census treats Hispanic/Latino as an ethnic category. This table excludes Latinos from the racial categories and assigns them to a separate category. Hispanics/Latinos may be of any race.
Race / Ethnicity (NH = Non-Hispanic)	Pop 2000	Pop 2010	Pop 2020	% 2000	% 2010	% 2020
White alone (NH)	10,740	12,060	12,153	83.74%	75.66%	70.03%
Black or African American alone (NH)	996	1,292	1,376	7.77%	8.11%	7.93%
Native American or Alaska Native alone (NH)	15	21	13	0.12%	0.13%	0.07%
Asian alone (NH)	721	1,711	2,226	5.62%	10.73%	12.83%
Native Hawaiian or Pacific Islander alone (NH)	4	3	2	0.03%	0.02%	0.01%
Other race alone (NH)	15	13	74	0.12%	0.08%	0.43%
Mixed race or Multiracial (NH)	143	351	812	1.12%	2.20%	4.68%
Hispanic or Latino (any race)	191	488	699	1.49%	3.06%	4.03%
Total	12,825	15,939	17,355	100.00%	100.00%	100.00%

Historical population
Census	Pop.	Note	%±
1890	402		—
1920	3,028		—
1930	9,613		217.5%
1940	13,069		36.0%
1950	16,035		22.7%
1960	15,245		−4.9%
1970	16,100		5.6%
1980	14,219		−11.7%
1990	13,874		−2.4%
2000	12,825		−7.6%
2010	15,939		24.3%
2020	17,355		8.9%
U.S. Decennial Census

=== 2020 census ===
As of the 2020 census, Clayton had a population of 17,355. The median age was 30.7 years. 16.4% of residents were under the age of 18, and 15.3% were 65 years of age or older. For every 100 females, there were 97.9 males, and for every 100 females age 18 and over, there were 96.1 males age 18 and over.

100.0% of residents lived in urban areas, while 0.0% lived in rural areas.

There were 6,158 households in Clayton, of which 26.5% had children under the age of 18 living in them. Of all households, 45.1% were married-couple households, 20.2% were households with a male householder and no spouse or partner present, and 30.8% were households with a female householder and no spouse or partner present. About 39.0% of all households were made up of individuals, and 12.7% had someone living alone who was 65 years of age or older.

There were 6,926 housing units, of which 11.1% were vacant. The homeowner vacancy rate was 2.1%, and the rental vacancy rate was 9.8%.

=== Income and poverty ===
The 2016–2020 5-year American Community Survey estimates show that the median household income was $108,387 (with a margin of error of +/- $9,440) and the median family income was $157,621 (+/- $21,434). Males had a median income of $54,146 (+/- $10,043) versus $36,023 (+/- $10,664) for females. The median income for those above 16 years old was $42,336 (+/- $3,903). Approximately, 6.2% of families and 8.0% of the population were below the poverty line, including 5.2% of those under the age of 18 and 2.8% of those ages 65 or over.

=== 2010 census ===
As of the census of 2010, there were 15,939 people, 5,322 households, and 2,921 families living in the city. The population density was 6,427.0 inhabitants per square mile (2,481.5/km^{2}). There were 6,321 housing units at an average density of 2,548.8 per square mile (984.1/km^{2}). The racial makeup of the city was 78.0% White, 8.2% African American, 0.2% Native American, 10.8% Asian, 0.4% from other races, and 2.4% from two or more races. Hispanic or Latino of any race were 3.1% of the population.

There were 5,322 households, of which 26.3% had children under the age of 18 living with them, 46.3% were married couples living together, 6.7% had a female householder with no husband present, 1.9% had a male householder with no wife present, and 45.1% were non-families. 37.5% of all households were made up of individuals, and 11.2% had someone living alone who was 65 years of age or older. The average household size was 2.12 and the average family size was 2.86.

The median age in the city was 29.2 years. 15.8% of residents were under the age of 18; 27.6% were between the ages of 18 and 24; 23.3% were from 25 to 44; 21.6% were from 45 to 64; and 11.8% were 65 years of age or older. The gender makeup of the city was 50.9% male and 49.1% female.

=== 2000 census ===
As of the census of 2000, there were 12,825 people, 5,370 households, and 2,797 families living in the city. The population density was 5,164.4 inhabitants per square mile (1,994.0/km^{2}). There were 5,852 housing units at an average density of 2,356.5 per square mile (909.8/km^{2}). The racial makeup of the city was 84.94% White, 7.77% Black or African American, 0.12% Native American, 5.62% Asian, 0.03% Pacific Islander, 0.29% from other races, and 1.22% from two or more races. Hispanic or Latino of any race were 1.49% of the population.

There were 5,370 households, out of which 25.9% had children under the age of 18 living with them, 43.4% were married couples living together, 6.7% had a female householder with no husband present, and 47.9% were non-families. 40.4% of all households were made up of individuals, and 11.8% had someone living alone who was 65 years of age or older. The average household size was 2.09 and the average family size was 2.90.

In the city, the population was spread out, with 20.1% under the age of 18, 10.7% from 18 to 24, 32.3% from 25 to 44, 22.6% from 45 to 64, and 14.3% who were 65 years of age or older. The median age was 37 years. For every 100 females, there were 100.5 males. For every 100 females age 18 and over, there were 98.0 males.

The median income for a household in the city was $64,184, and the median income for a family was $107,346. Males had a median income of $64,737 versus $42,757 for females. The per capita income for the city was $48,055. About 5.0% of families and 7.7% of the population were below the poverty line, including 9.5% of those under age 18 and 3.2% of those age 65 or over.

== Government ==
Clayton is governed via a six-member board of aldermen and a mayor. Aldermen are elected from one of three wards with each electing two members. The mayor is elected in a citywide vote. A city clerk is appointed by the Mayor and Board of Aldermen. Police services are provided by the Clayton Police Department, led by Chief Mark J. Smith, with fire and rescue services provided by the Clayton Fire Department, led by Chief Ernie Rhodes.

Currently the mayor of Clayton is Bridget McAndrew and the Board of Aldermen includes:

Clayton Board of Aldermen
Ward 1	Ward 2	Ward 3
Rick Hummell	Susan Buse	Gary Feder
Becky Patel	Jeffery Yorg	Kami Waldman
Clayton Mayor & Board of Aldermen

Because of its status as the St. Louis County seat, Clayton is home to the St. Louis County Council, the St. Louis County courts, the Buzz Westfall Justice Center, and the St. Louis County Police headquarters.

== Economy ==
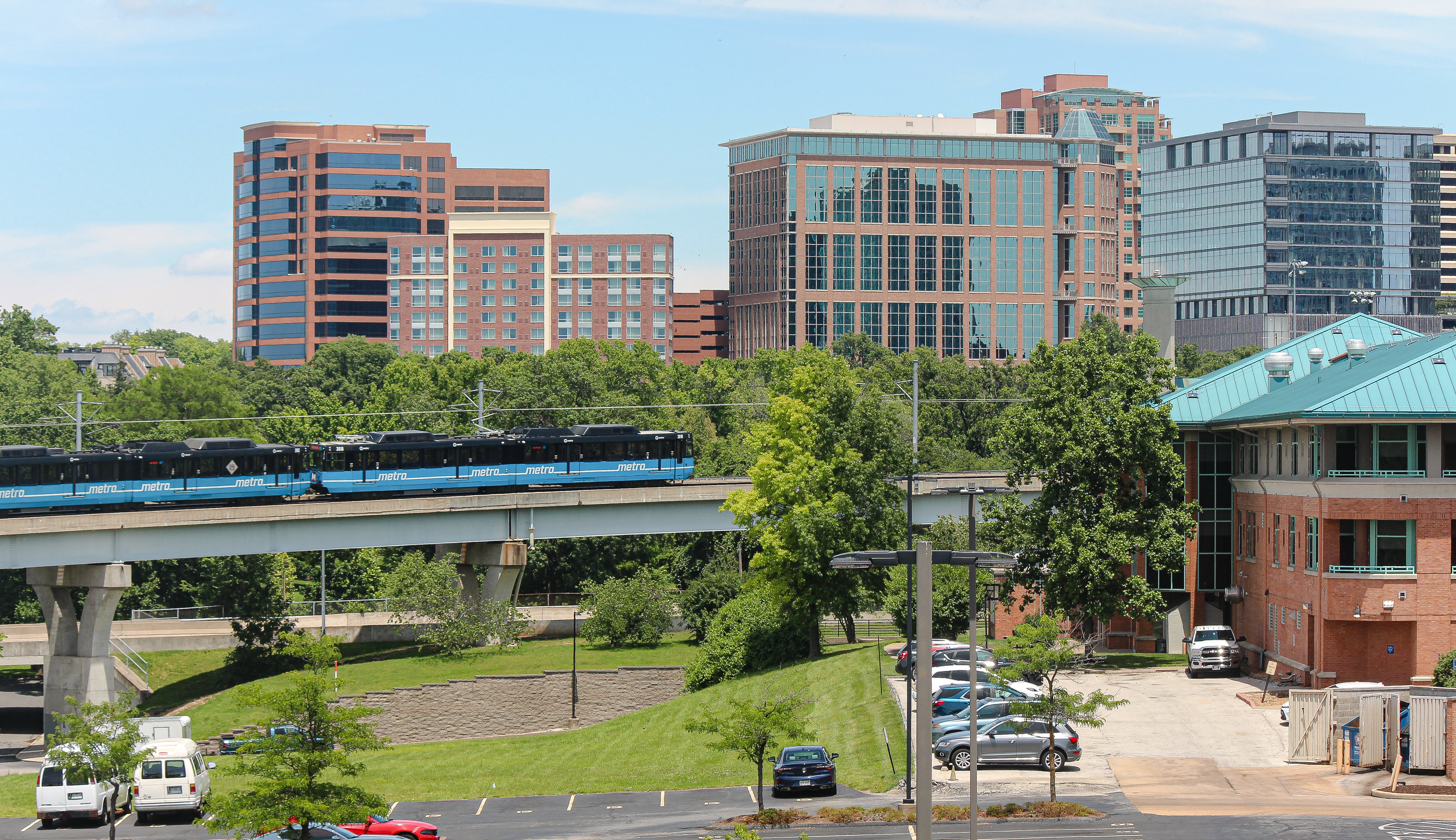
Downtown Clayton

Clayton is one of the St. Louis region's primary business districts and the second largest after downtown St. Louis. The city boasts roughly 46,000 daytime employees and is home to a large and diverse group of the region's Fortune 1000 headquarters, blue chip companies, law firms, and banks.

In addition to the largest employers listed below, other companies that call Clayton home or have operations there include Bank of America, Barry-Wehmiller, Cassidy Turley, Cushman & Wakefield, JPMorgan Chase, Stifel, and Straub's Markets. The unemployment rate in 2024 was 3%. In 2024, due to a shift in post-pandemic work patterns, the Clayton Chamber of Commerce closed.

=== Largest employers ===
#	Employer	# of Employees ‡
1	St. Louis County	2,192
2	Washington University	1,255
3	Enterprise Holdings	1,124
4	School District of Clayton	647
5	Centene	541
6	Caleres	531
7	Moneta Group, LLC	450
8	Commerce Bank	418
9	NISA Investment Advisors, LLC	400
10	Ritz Carlton	376
‡ City of Clayton Annual Comprehensive Financial Report

== Transportation ==
=== Public transportation ===
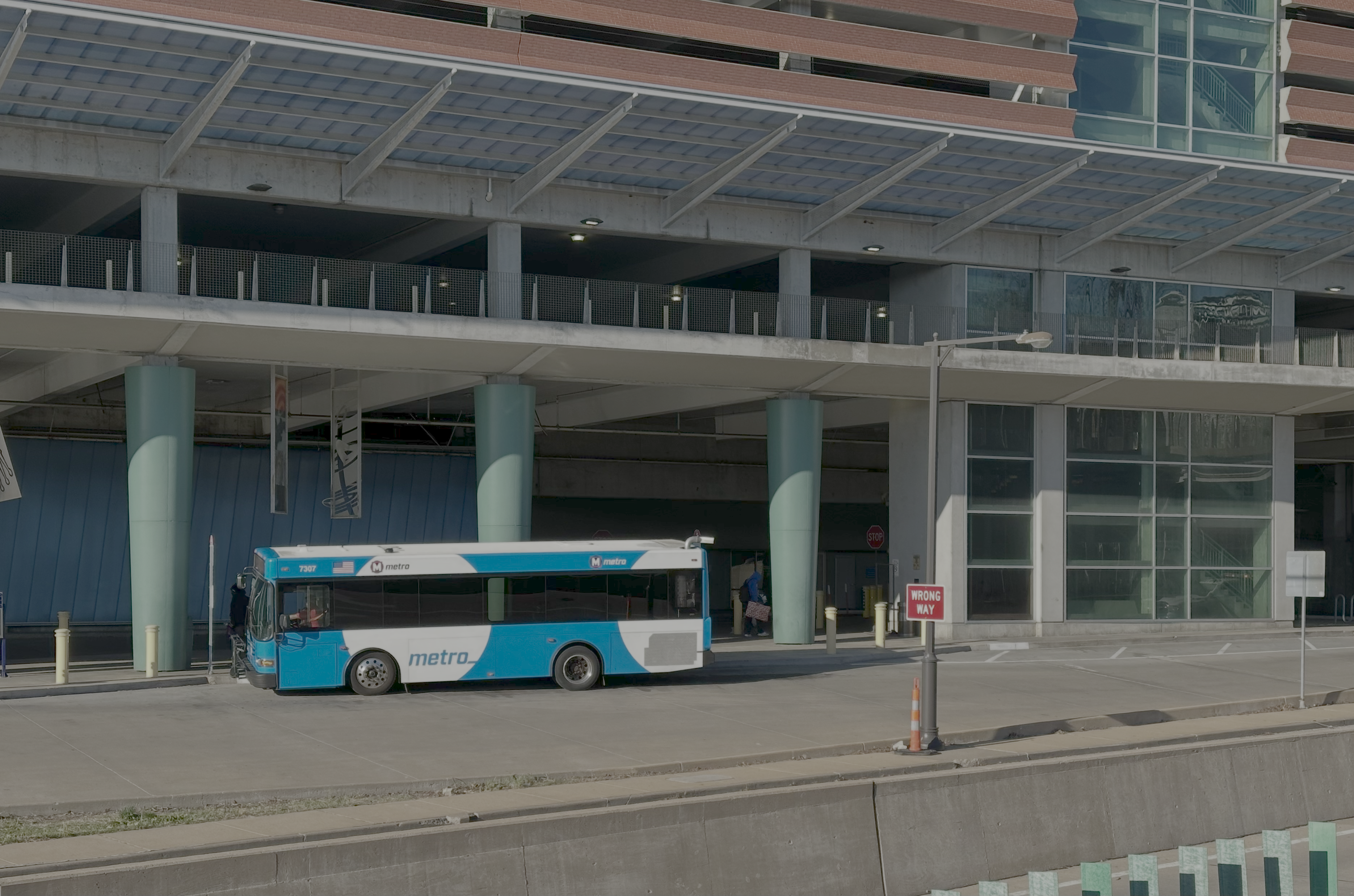
Clayton Transit Center in 2026

Clayton is served by the Blue Line of the St. Louis region's MetroLink light rail system. The city has two stations: the Forsyth station, which serves downtown Clayton but is within city limits of University City; and Clayton. Metro Transit also operates the Clayton Transit Center on Shaw Park Drive, which connects the Clayton light rail station with multiple MetroBus routes and paratransit services.

=== Major roads and highways ===
Major arterial routes in Clayton include Big Bend Boulevard, Brentwood Boulevard, Clayton Road, Forest Park Parkway, Hanley Road, and Interstate 170. Forsyth Boulevard (which changes to Old Bonhomme between North Clayton and University City) was at one time an ancient Native American trail and was part of the route of the 1904 Olympic marathon. Other primary routes in the city include Maryland Avenue and Wydown Boulevard, the latter of which was named a Great Street by the American Planning Association in 2010.

== Education ==
=== Higher education ===
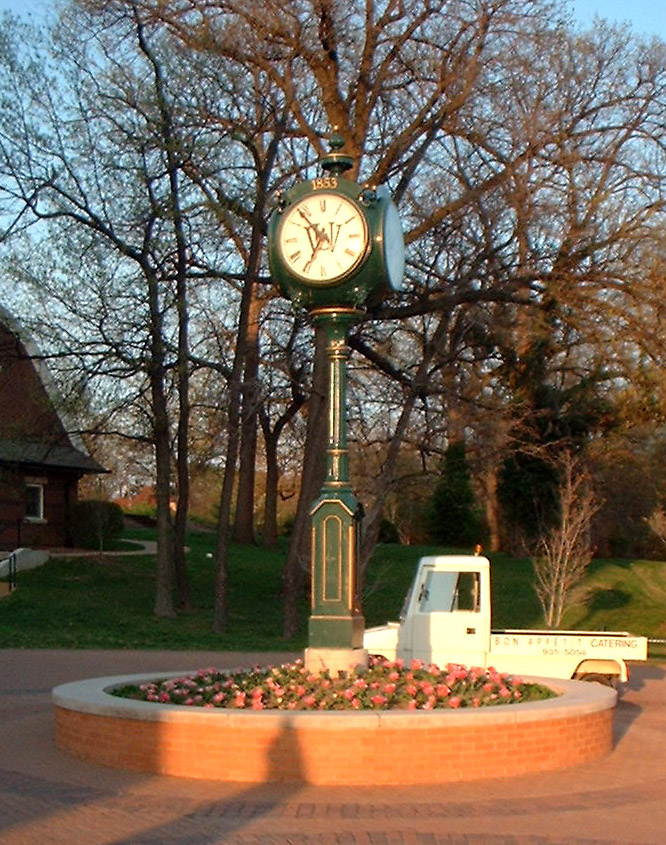
The clocktower in the center of the South 40

Clayton is home to Concordia Seminary of the Lutheran Church–Missouri Synod, located near DeMun. Additionally, a portion of Washington University's Danforth Campus, the South 40, is located in eastern Clayton and primarily consists of student housing. Washington University's West Campus is located in downtown Clayton and houses offices for the library, information technology, and other university departments. In 2007, Washington University acquired the former home of Christian Brothers College High School in the DeMun neighborhood. Now known as the South Campus, is used primarily by intramural and club sports programs in addition to community theater groups.

Previously, the city was home to Fontbonne University until it shuttered at the end of the 2025 academic year.

=== Primary and secondary schools ===
The city's public schools are operated by the School District of Clayton. Its three public elementary schools are Glenridge Elementary School in the Moorlands neighborhood, Captain Elementary School in the DeMun neighborhood, and Meramec Elementary School in Davis Place. These schools feed into Wydown Middle School on Wydown Boulevard which in turn feeds into Clayton High School, next to Shaw Park near downtown Clayton. In 2021 the district's enrollment was 2,412 students.

Several of Clayton's elementary schools have been closed or repurposed. Bellevue School served one year as the Seventh Grade Center and was ultimately sold, demolished, and replaced with a medical office building connected to St. Mary's Hospital across Bellevue Avenue. Gay School is now the Clayton Family Center; Maryland School has been repurposed into a Centene training center; DeMun School burned in a fire and was replaced by Ralph M. Captain Elementary; and, after Brown v. Board of Education abolished segregated schools, Crispus Attucks School in downtown Clayton was demolished and replaced with an office building.

=== Public libraries ===
The St. Louis County Library operates the Mid-County Branch in Clayton, which was rebuilt and reopened on September 4, 2020.

== Parks and recreation ==
At 30-acres, Shaw Park is the largest park in Clayton. The park hosts an Olympic-sized swimming pool, a kiddie pool, a diving pool with three platforms, 11 tennis courts, an ice rink, a baseball and soccer field, volleyball courts, handball courts, a sensory garden, a trail, a playground, and multiple pavilions. The park hosts Clayton's Independence Day celebration and the Taste of Clayton food festival. The city's second-largest park is the 14.5-acre Oak Knoll Park which was once home to the St. Louis area's Academy of Science before the organization moved to Forest Park and became the St. Louis Science Center.

Clayton is home to several additional neighborhood parks that include Anderson Park, Clayshire Park, Concordia Park, DeMun Park, Hanley Park, Henry Wright Park, Maryland Avenue Park, Taylor Park, Whitburn Park, and Wydown Park.

Additionally, the city is served by the Great Rivers Greenway District's Centennial Greenway, which enters the city on the north near Gay Avenue and ends in Shaw Park. Other routes with dedicated bicycle lanes include Maryland Avenue and Wydown Boulevard, the latter of which connects Clayton to St. Louis' Forest Park.

== See also ==
- List of cities in Missouri
- List of tallest buildings in Clayton, Missouri
