= Glenridge Elementary School =

Glenridge Elementary School may refer to:

- Glenridge Elementary School - Clayton, Missouri (St. Louis area) - School District of Clayton
- Glenridge Elementary School - Woodlawn, Prince George's County, Maryland (Washington, DC area) - Prince George's County Public Schools
- Glenridge Elementary School - Kent, Washington - Kent School District
