= Kathryn Sansone =

American homemaker and personal trainer (born 1962)

Kathryn Demmas Sansone
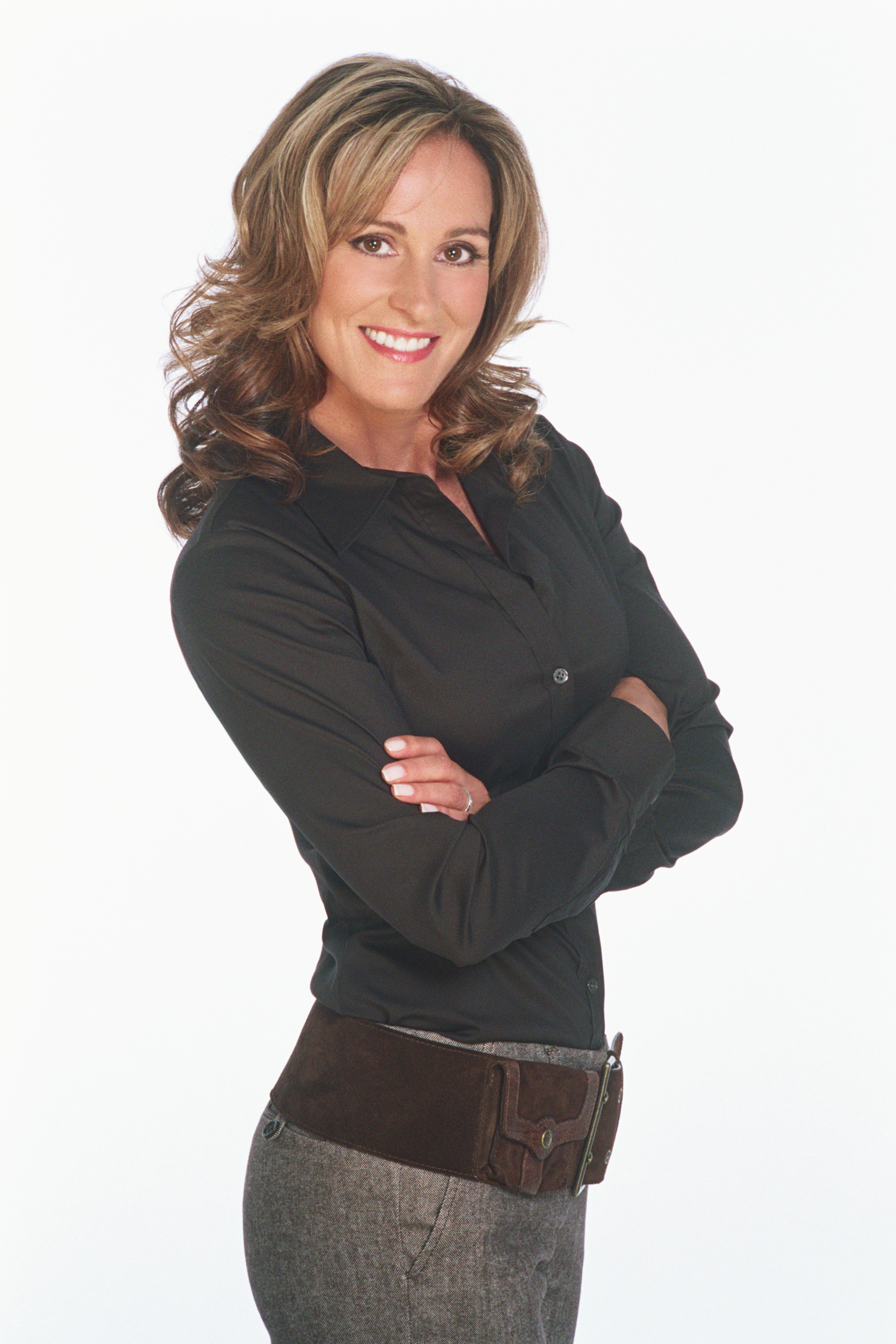
- Sansone in 2006
- Born: 1962 (age 62–63); St. Louis, Missouri, U.S.
- Occupation: Personal trainer
- Known for: celebrated as an "unforgettable mom"
- Spouse: Jim Sansone
- Children: 10

Kathryn Demmas Sansone (born 1962) is an American homemaker and personal trainer, best known for being celebrated by Oprah as an "unforgettable mom". Sansone went from being a member of Oprah's audience to being a featured guest on Oprah's television show, and was interviewed by Oprah for Mother's Day 2003 in O, the Oprah Magazine. As a result, Sansone wrote a book, Woman First, Family Always, which became a top-1000 seller on amazon.com. As of early 2006, Sansone has 10 children, ranging in age from 8 months to 18 years old.

== Biography ==
Sansone was born Kathryn Demmas in St. Louis, Missouri in 1962, to Dan Demmas, a printing broker, and Helen Georges, a homemaker. As a 16-year-old at Clayton High School, she met her future husband, 17-year-old Jim Sansone (another native St. Louisan who later became a real estate developer). They married in 1987. Sansone graduated high school in 1980, and attended Texas Christian University in Fort Worth, Texas, studying education. She transferred to St. Louis University, graduating with a degree in elementary education in 1985. She then taught 4th-6th grade for four years at Oak Hill / Villa Duchesne, until the birth of her first child.

After a few more children, Sansone and her husband built a gym in their home, and Sansone began teaching aerobics classes at local corporations, such as CPI and Barnes-Jewish Hospital. She also briefly had a business, "Cha-Cha's", selling chocolate chip cookies from 1998-2000. In 2002, she became certified as a personal trainer, and gave group fitness classes in their home gym.

== Oprah appearance ==
A fan of The Oprah Winfrey Show, Sansone occasionally went to tapings with her family. In 2002, she went to the show for her 40th birthday. The show's theme for that day was "How?", about how some mothers with many children were still able to stay in good physical shape. During the audience Q&A, Sansone was one of the women who raised her hand to speak. She stood up, six months pregnant with her ninth child, and told how she trained with weights and stayed fit. On the spot, Oprah invited her on stage to give her a hug. A few weeks later, one of Oprah's producers called to invite Sansone onto the show as a guest.

In January 2003, Sansone received another call from Oprah's team, to inform her that she had been chosen as the featured woman for O, the Oprah Magazine's "Mother's Day Interview" for 2003. Oprah and her entourage traveled to St. Louis and stayed with the Sansone family at their home for an entire day to produce the article. Sansone was also featured in an article in Fit Pregnancy magazine.

== 2005 book ==
As a result of the attention, Sansone was flooded with questions from the public. In response, she began writing a book in 2004, full of common-sense tips about life and motherhood. The book was published in December 2005, a few months after the birth of her 10th child. Parents magazine reviewed it as a "collection of advice and insights that have helped her balance children, marriage, and time for herself." A reviewer for the Baltimore Sun said the book, "isn't the best-written book you will find. But it's an inspiring, uplifting read, and sometimes that's as valuable as great literature." The Fort Worth Star-Telegram said, "The book doesn't offer any earth-shattering revelations. Instead, it offers recipes, workout tips and enough cute anecdotes that, by the last chapter, you're willing to forgive her for having that flawless figure."

Also in 2005, Oprah published her own book, Live Your Best Life, with "all her best interviews", which included the one with Sansone.

== Awards ==
In 2004, America Online flew Sansone and her husband to New York, for their first annual "CEO - Chief Everything Officer" award, as part of their "Life Management" program. One CEO award was given to Maria Shriver, and Sansone was introduced as the "real-life example" of the award. Sansone was also on the jury panel to choose the recipients for the 2006 award.

As of 2008, Sansone and her family live in St. Louis, Missouri

== Works ==
- Kathryn Sansone. Woman First, Family Always: Real-life Wisdom from a Mother of Ten, 2006, Meredith Books, ISBN 0-696-22832-7
- Oprah Winfrey, Live Your Best Life, 2005, ISBN 0-8487-3105-0 (contains interview with Sansone)
