= Shaw Park, Clayton =

Park in Clayton, Missouri, United States

Shaw Park
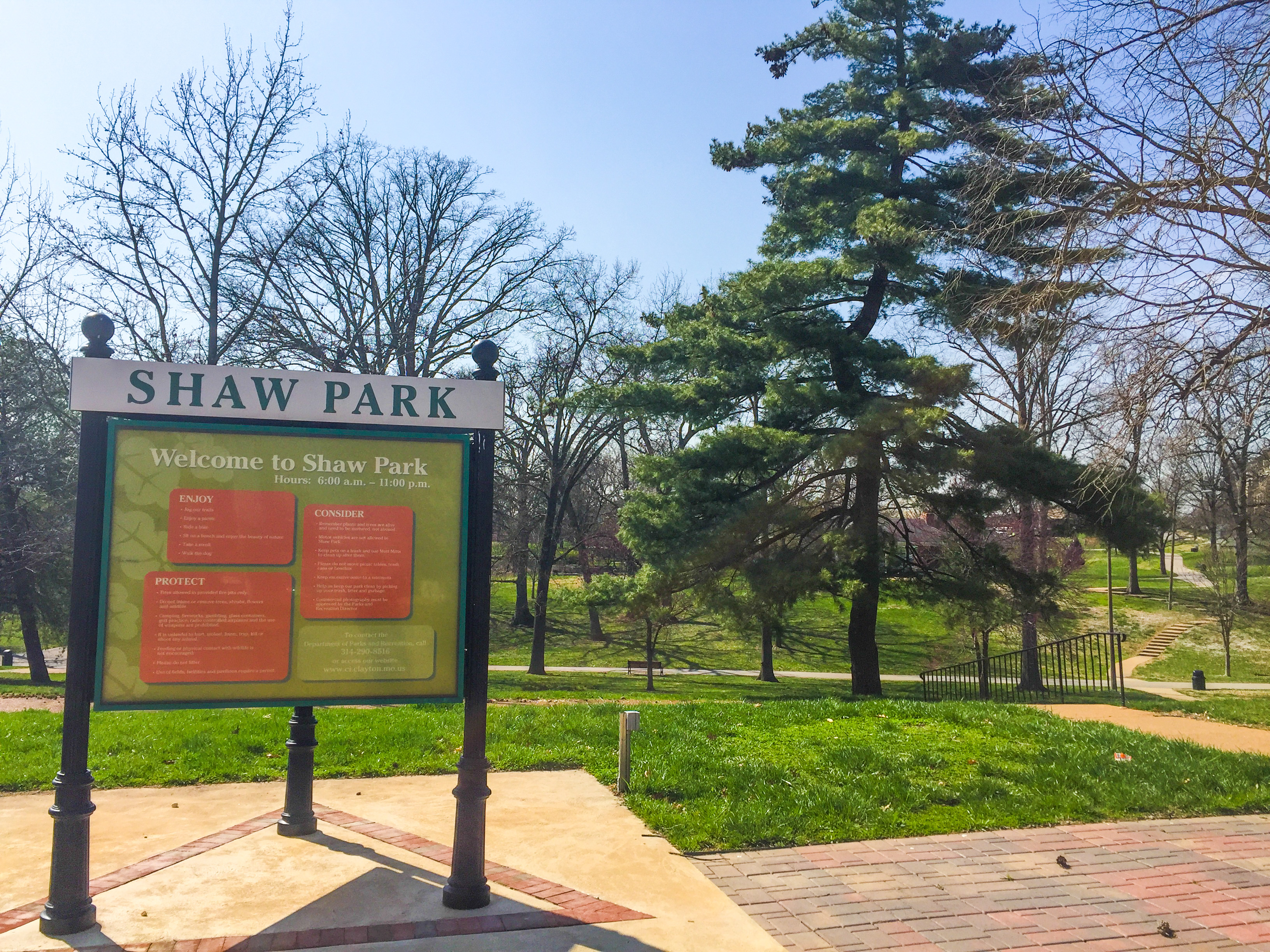
- Shaw Park, Clayton
- Interactive map of Shaw Park
- Location: Clayton, MO
- Coordinates: 38.648°N 90.345°W
- Area: 30 acres (12 ha)
- Created: 1935
- Public transit: MetroBus

Shaw Park is a 30-acre park in Clayton, Missouri, a near suburb of St. Louis. The city's largest and oldest park, it is bordered by Forsyth Boulevard and Forest Park Parkway on the north and south, and Interstate 170 and Forsyth Boulevard on the west and east. The park is west of St. Louis County District Courthouse and adjacent to Clayton High School.

Shaw Park was founded in 1935 under Mayor Charles A. Shaw. The park was dedicated in 1937 and cost $280,000, with $30,000 coming from the city of Clayton and the rest coming from the federal government.

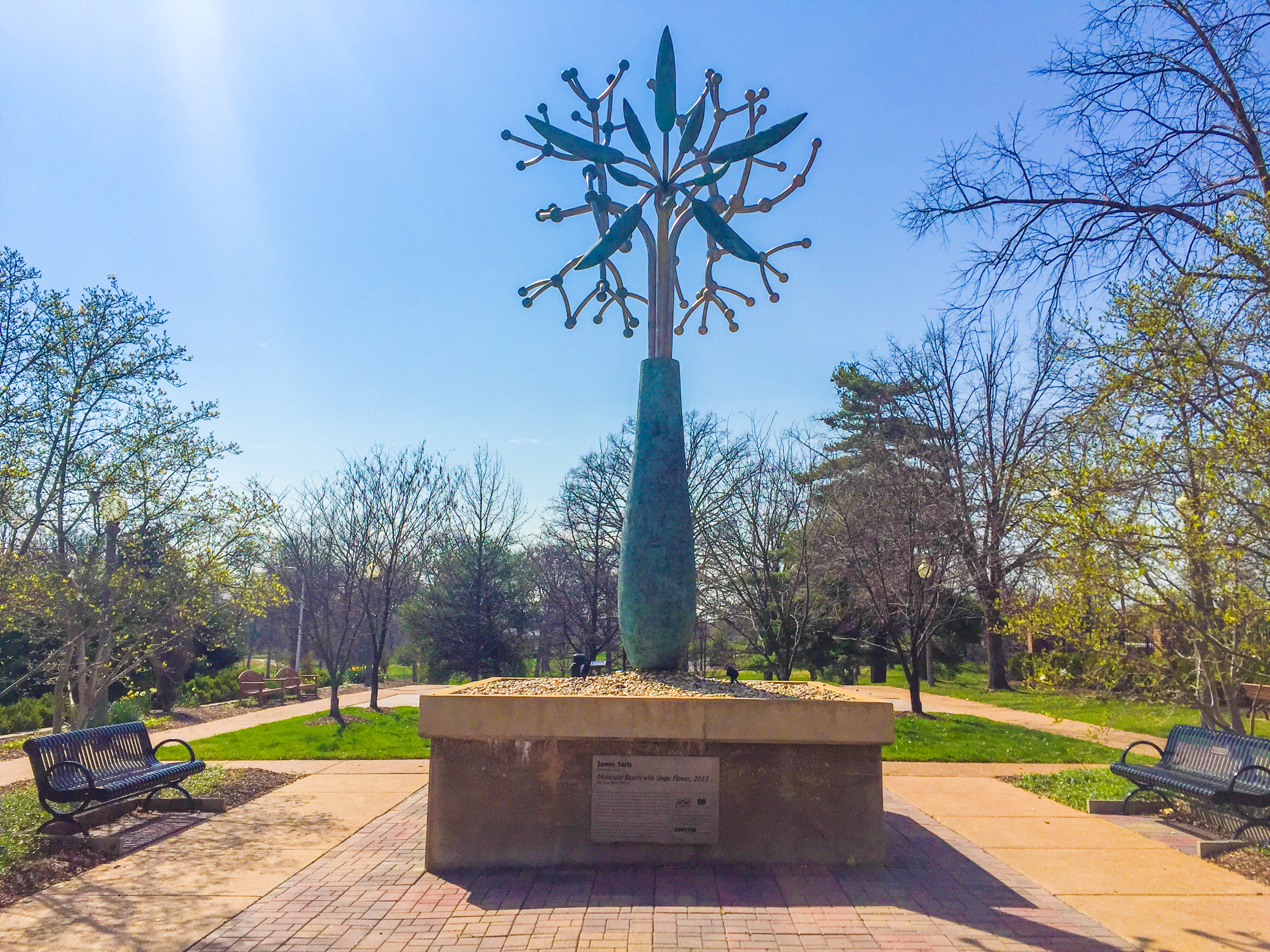
James Surls, Molecular Bloom with Single Flower, steel and bronze, 2013, Shaw Park, Clayton

Shaw Park has an Olympic-sized swimming pool, 11 tennis courts, a baseball and soccer field, volleyball courts, handball courts, a sensory garden, a trail, a playground, and multiple pavilions.

It hosts the annual St. Louis Art Fair and Taste of Clayton events.

== See also ==
- Parks in Greater St. Louis
