= Saint Louis Science Center =

Planetarium

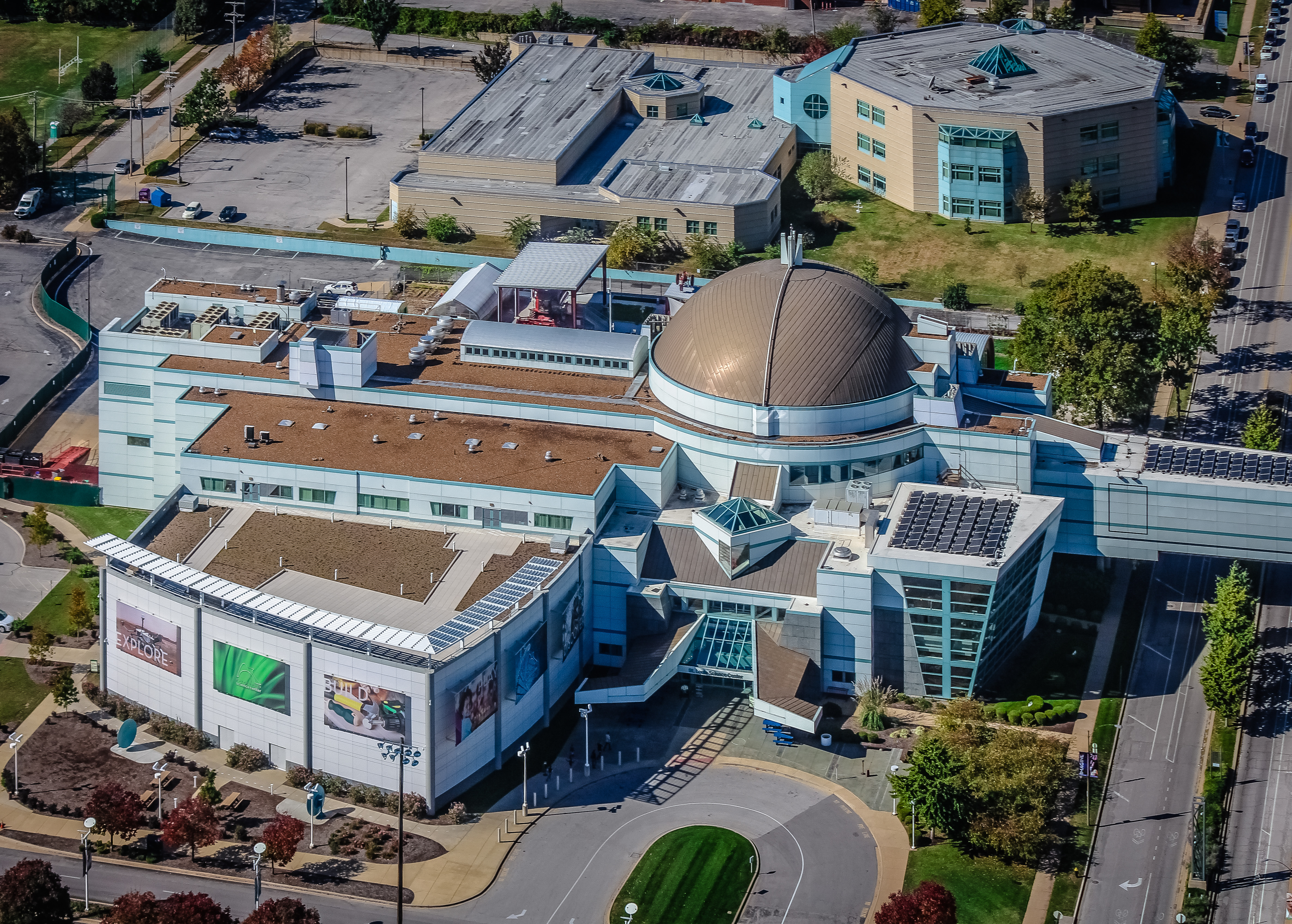
- Saint Louis Science Center in 2016

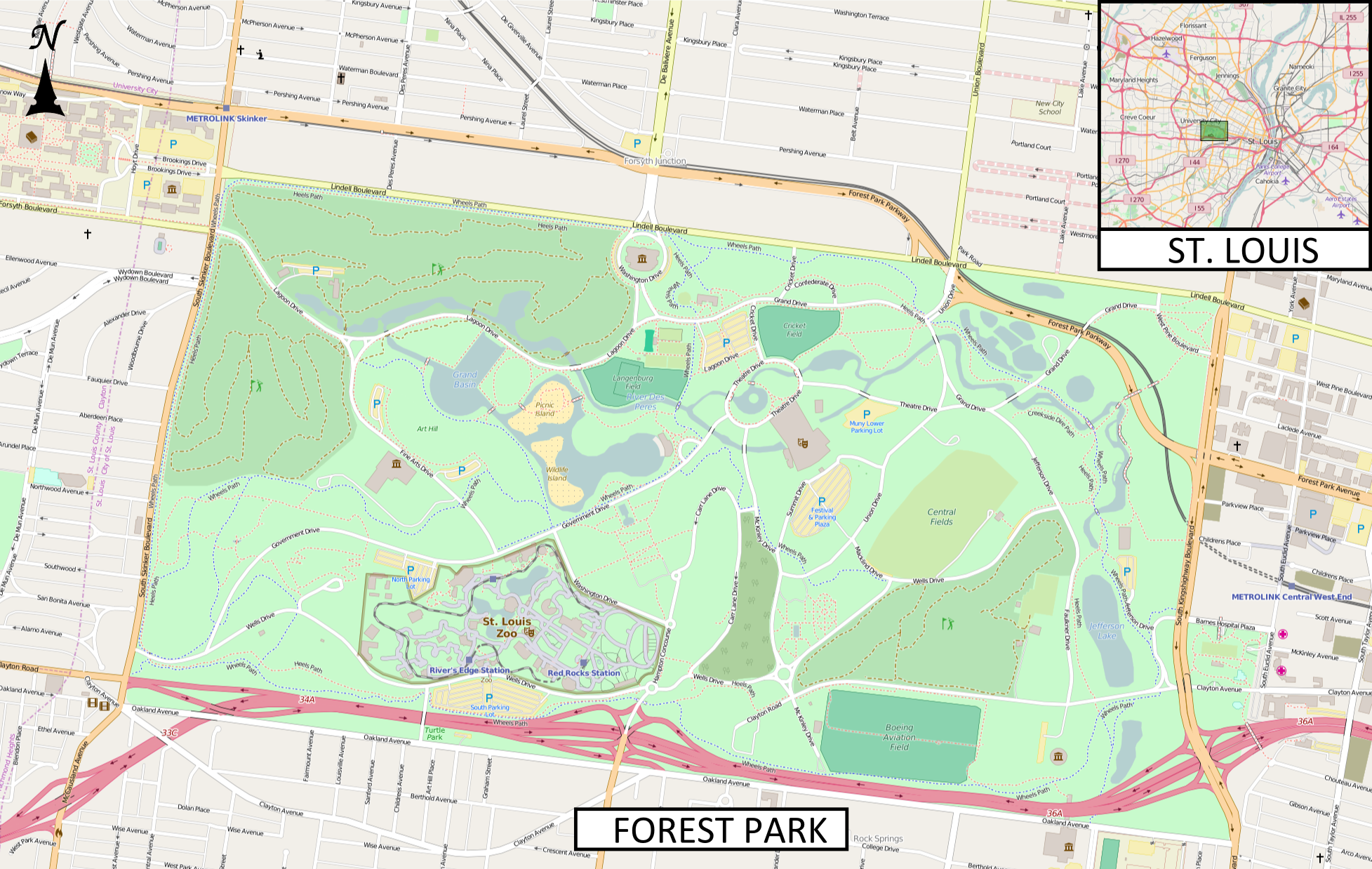
- Location within Forest Park (St. Louis)
- Established: 1963
- Location: 5050 Oakland Ave, St. Louis, Missouri, United States
- Coordinates: 38°37′44″N 90°16′15″W
- Public transit access: MetroBus
- Website: www.slsc.org

The Saint Louis Science Center, founded as a planetarium in 1963, is a collection of buildings including a science museum and planetarium in St. Louis, Missouri, on the southeastern corner of Forest Park. With over 750 exhibits in a complex of over 300,000 square feet (28,000 m^{2}), it is among the largest of its type in the United States.

== James S. McDonnell Planetarium ==
See James S. McDonnell Planetarium.

== Science Center ==
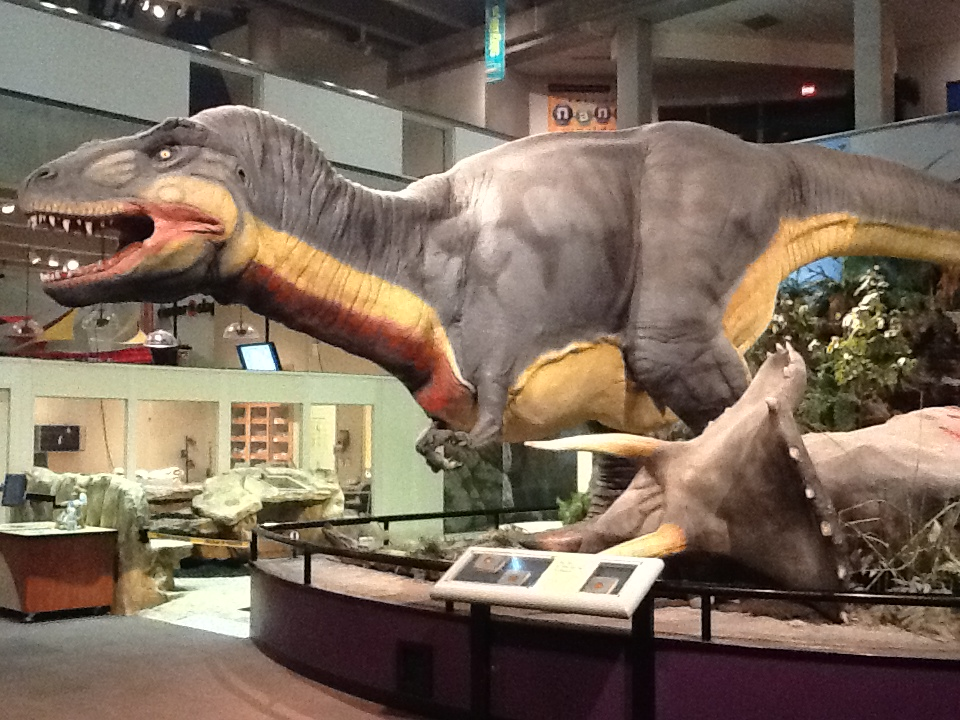
Dinosaur diorama on the lower level

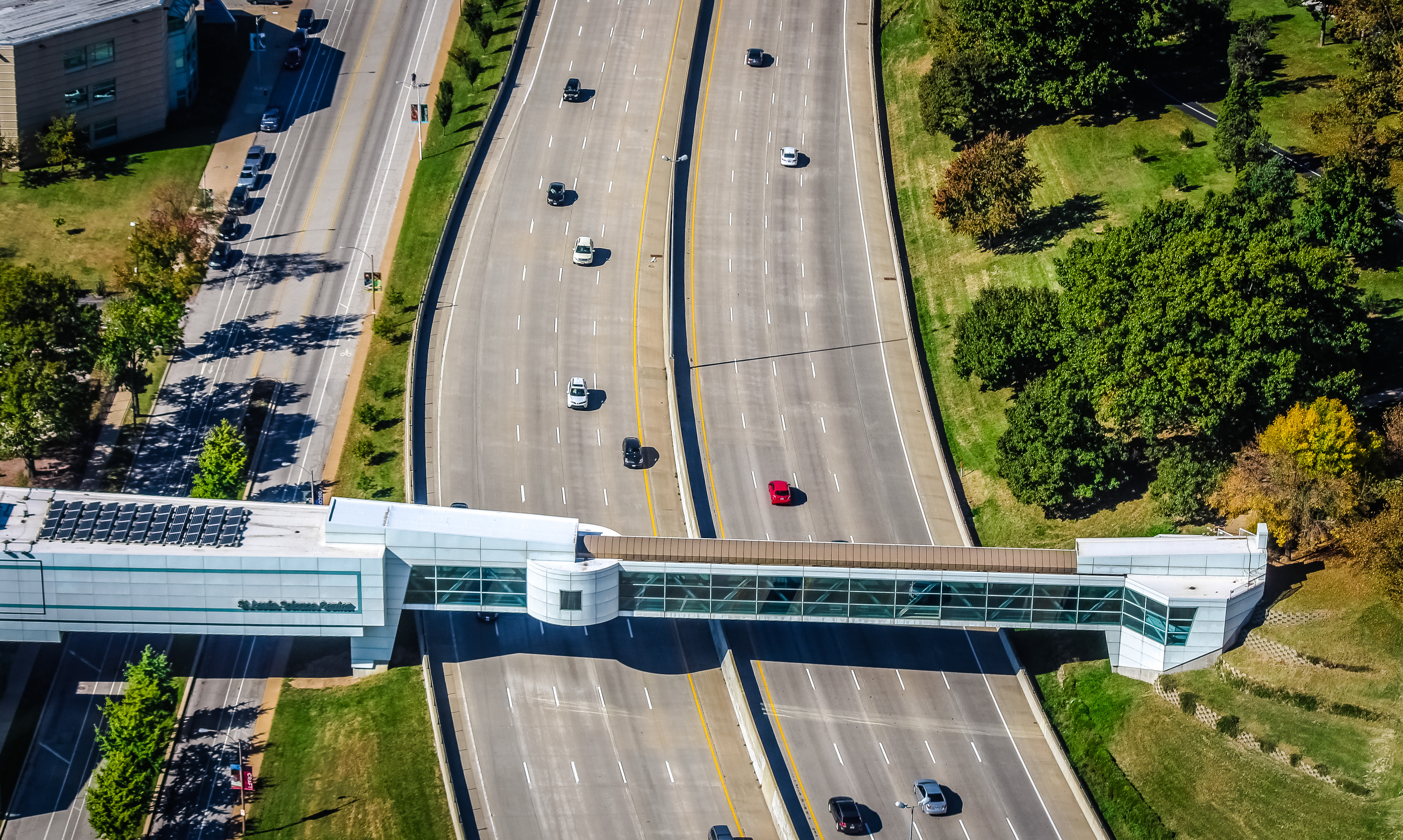
The skybridge crosses Interstate 64 between the main building and the planetarium

In 1972, the Museum of Science and Natural History, located in Oak Knoll Park in the St. Louis suburb of Clayton, began to receive funds from sales tax through the Metropolitan Zoological Park and Museum District. In 1983, the museum purchased the Planetarium from the city, and closed it for remodeling. On July 20, 1985, the Planetarium reopened as the Saint Louis Science Center. On November 2, 1991, as part of a $34 million expansion, a new building opened across from the Planetarium south of I-64, on Oakland Avenue, increasing the size of the Science Center by a factor of seven. The new building was constructed on land that had previously been the site of the Falstaff Brewing Corporation headquarters. Connected to the Planetarium via a Skybridge over I-64, the new exhibits in the main building were devoted to Earth science, emerging technology, life sciences, physical science, and chemistry. Within two months, the newly remodeled St. Louis Science Center became the most visited science center in the world.

One of the most recognizable features of the St. Louis Science Center is the five-story domed OMNIMAX theater, which shows a variety of educational films and documentaries year round. Occasionally, the theater features feature films as they are released, such as Star Wars. In 2019, the OMNIMAX theater underwent its first major renovations since opening in 1991, becoming the fourth OMNIMAX theater to use the IMAX with laser projection system. Other improvements include new state-of-the-art sound technology, a NanoSeam screen for a more uniform screen surface, and upgraded and wider seating.

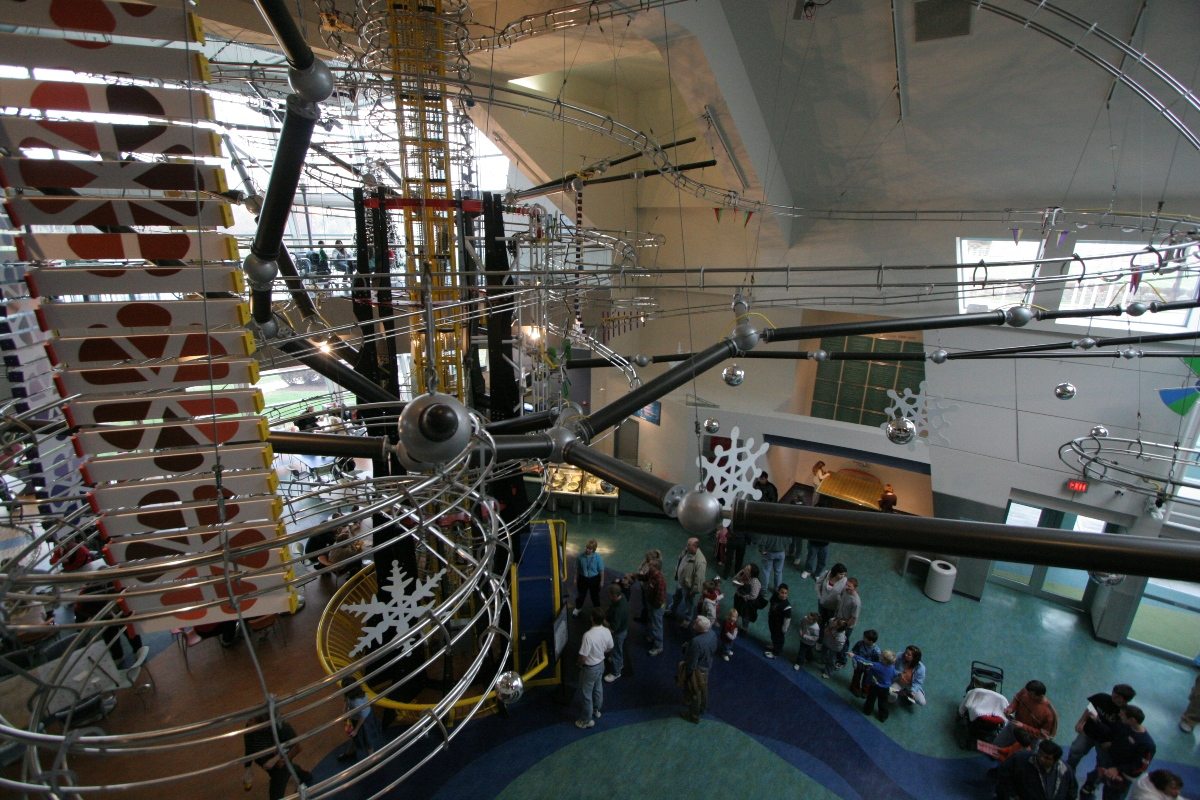
Energizer Ball Machine in lobby of main building

== Exploradome and GROW ==
On February 8, 1997, an air-supported building was added to the main building, the Exploradome. With an additional 18,000 square feet (1,700 m^{2}), it was intended as a temporary facility for traveling exhibitions, additional classrooms, and to host large group events. Notable exhibits have included shows on the RMS Titanic ocean liner and Body Worlds, a traveling exhibition of preserved human bodies. From October 2011 until May 2012, the main building hosted Star Trek: The Exhibition, a major showcase of Star Trek props, costumes and artifacts, including a full-size bridge from the USS Enterprise. The Exploradome was deflated to make way for a planned expansion after 16 years of operations on June 24, 2013.

In 2016, the museum’s largest major addition in 25 years was completed. The new exhibit space was designed by St. Louis-based design firm Arcturis with Gyo Obata brought on as a consultant. Called GROW, the project’s centerpiece is a 5,000 square foot permanent pavilion that has a flexible, open floor plan that houses ever-changing exhibits and events. Its primary focus is the story of agriculture and the many ways technology is shaping the agricultural landscape.

== Exhibitions ==
The Mcdonnell planetarium

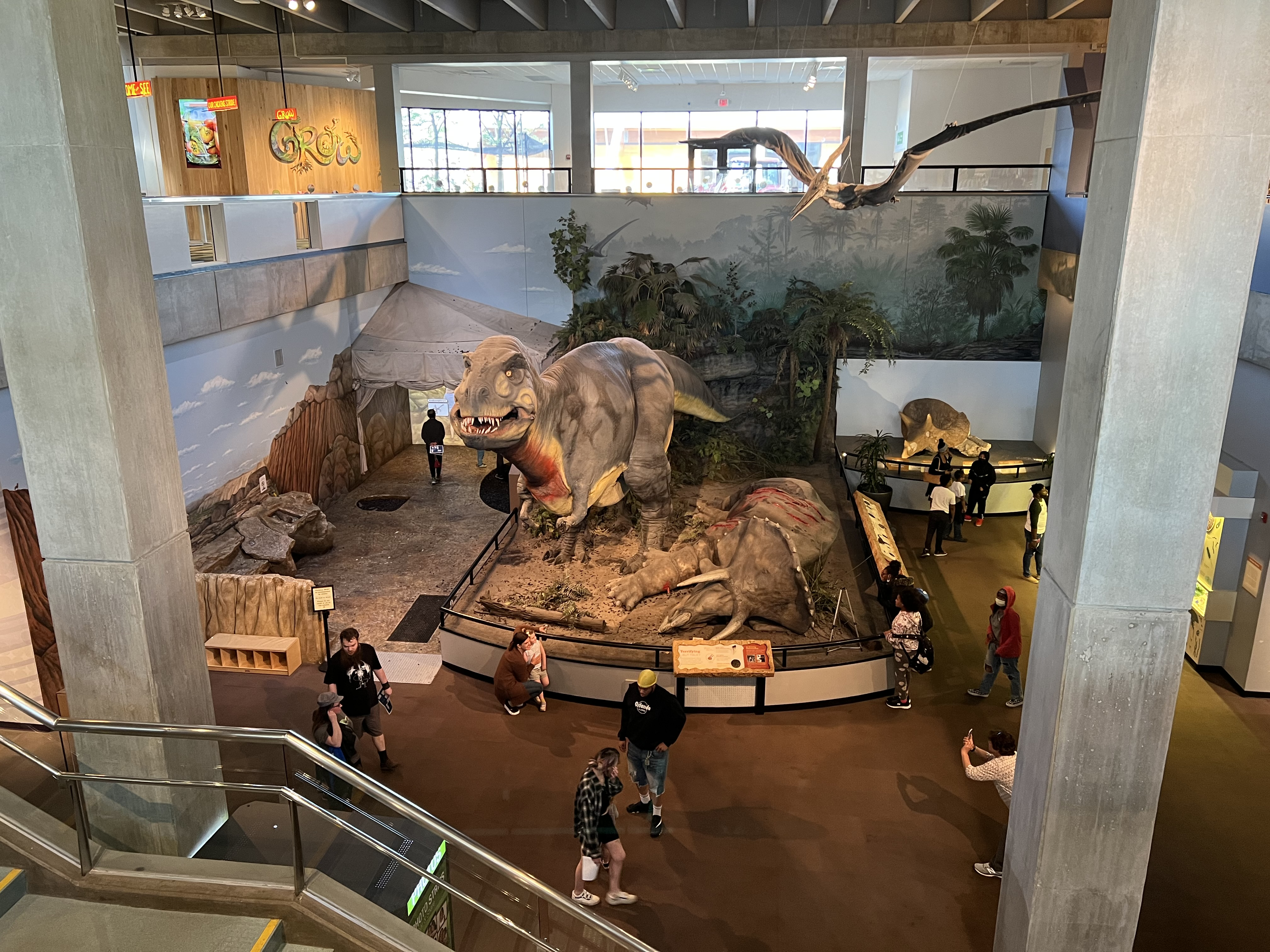
Lower level exhibits

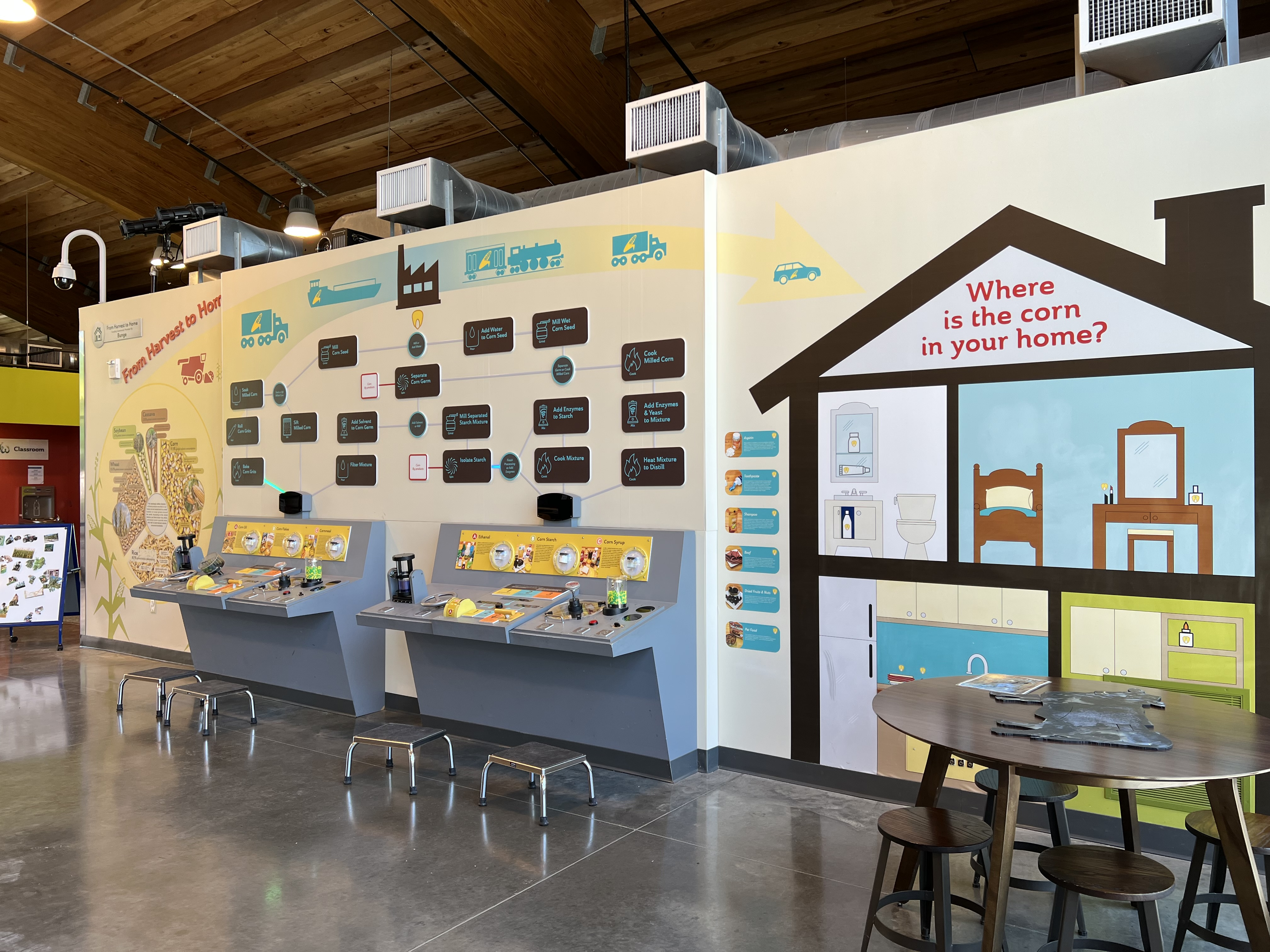
Creative commons area

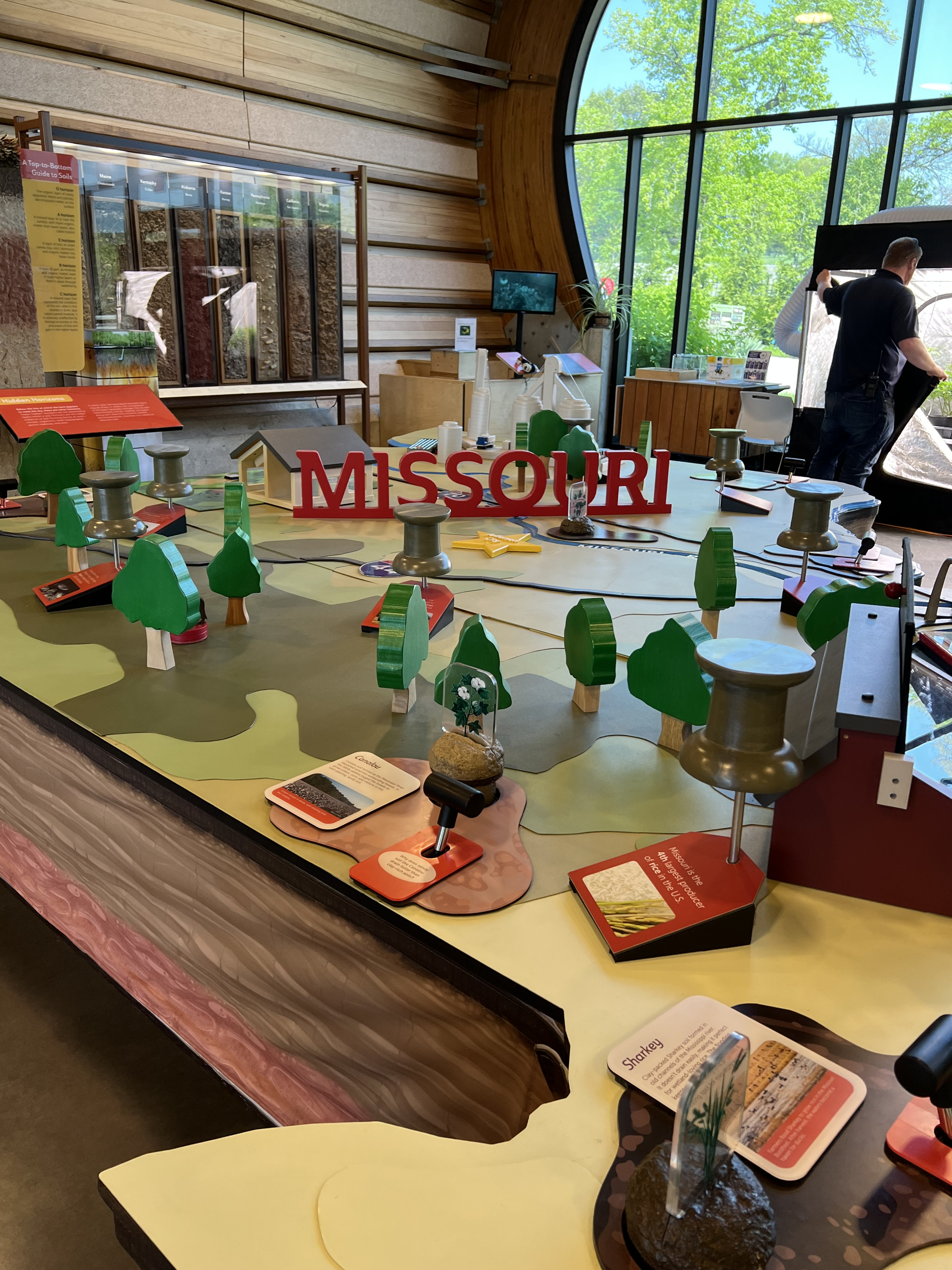
Missouri map

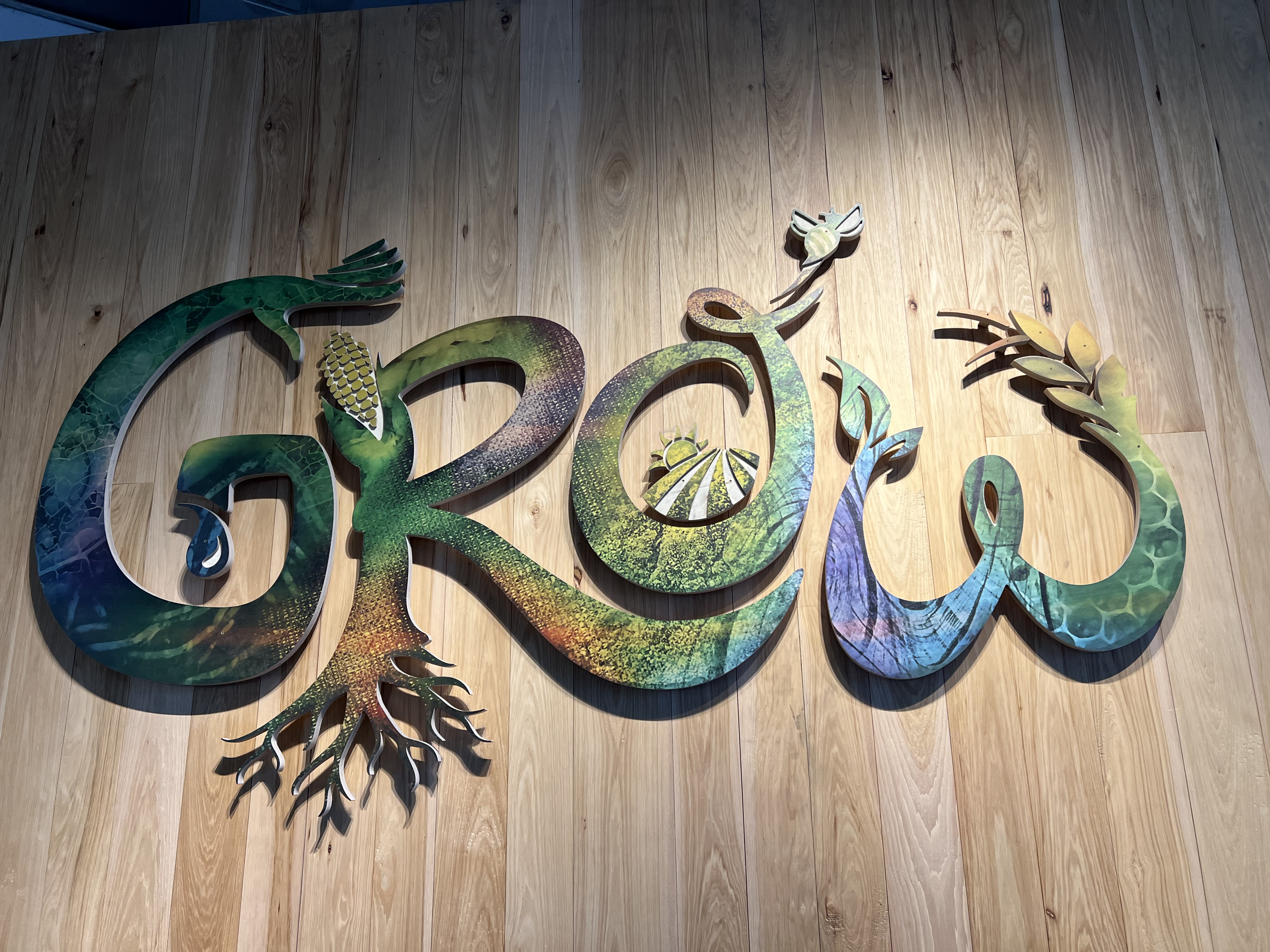
GROW sign 2022

=== WeatherReadyFest ===
The 2018 WeatherReadyFest event was held at the St. Louis Science Center featuring talks, demonstrations and displays from the National Weather Service and other government and private agencies.

=== Washington University in St. Louis CCSN Outreach ===
Washington University students participating in the Cognitive, Computational and Systems Neuroscience (CCSN) pathway have created a series of exhibitions displayed at the St. Louis Science Center in an outreach program since the pathway's inception in 2008.

== See also ==
- X Prize Foundation
- Erik Lindbergh
- List of science centers
