= Clayton High School (Missouri) =

American high school in Greater St. Louis, Missouri

Location
- 1 Mark Twain Circle; Clayton, Missouri; United States; 38.6502°N 90.3462°W

Information
- Type: Public high school
- Established: 1908; 118 years ago
- School district: School District of Clayton
- Principal: Dan Gutchewsky
- Teaching staff: 77.73 (FTE)
- Grades: 9–12
- Enrollment: 835 (2024–25)
- Student to teacher ratio: 10.86
- Colors: Blue and orange
- Athletics conference: Suburban Conference
- Nickname: Greyhounds
- Rival: Ladue
- Accreditation: Cognia
- Newspaper: The Globe
- Yearbook: Clamo
- Website: claytonschools.net/chs

Clayton High School is a public high school in Clayton, Missouri.

== History ==
The first Clayton High School classes met on the upper floors of the Forsyth School beginning in 1908. In 1911, the school graduated its first class. Designed by William B. Ittner, the first Clayton High School building opened in September 1917 at 7500 Maryland Avenue. The building, which cost slightly less than $111,000 to construct and $14,000 to partially equip, included six main classrooms and a large study hall–library. The building also featured a chemistry, biology and physics laboratories, an art room, a music room, and several vocational and technical classrooms. The school also included a combined gymnasium and 700-seat auditorium. By the 1940s, however, the building was overcrowded, and the district considered multiple options for its replacement.

Although planned to open in 1948, postwar supply shortages delayed the construction of a new building until the early 1950s. In 1952, the school building was sold to the department store chain Famous-Barr. The school was demolished for the store parking lot. The new building opened in 1954 at 1 Mark Twain Circle, and the first class graduated in 1955. At the start of the school's 1954 opening, the school's entrance featured a six-foot diameter granite globe sculpture weighing nearly ten tons. A block of ice was used to help set the globe in place.

== Academics ==
Clayton has a relatively low dropout rate and a high graduation rate; for the 2010–2011 school year, fewer than 1 percent of students dropped out compared to the Missouri state dropout rate of 3.4 percent. Since the passage of No Child Left Behind in 2001, Clayton met the requirements for adequate yearly progress in communication arts in 2004, 2006, and from 2009 through 2011, and in mathematics from 2006 through 2010.

Graduation and dropout rates by year
Year	Graduates	Cohort dropouts‡	Graduation rate†	Total dropouts‡	Dropout rate†
2002	189	13	93.6	11	1.3
2003	192	7	96.5	5	.6
2004	209	8	96.3	3	.3
2005	227	3	98.7	5	.6
2006	211	6	97.2	7	.8
2007	237	4	98.3	3	.4
2008	186	5	97.4	1	.1
2009	231	2	99.1	4	.5
2010	205	3	98.6	3	.4
2011	198	1	99.5	1	.1
‡ Cohort dropouts is the number of students from the grade level graduating for that year who dropped out. † Graduation rate is calculated as number of graduates divided by number of graduates plus dropouts, multiplied by 100. ‡ Total dropouts is the number of students at the school who dropped out of school during that school year. † Dropout rate is calculated as number of total dropouts/(September enrollment plus transfers in and minus transfers out + September enrollment)/2).

== Activities ==
For the 2011–12 school year, the school offered 27 activities approved by the Missouri State High School Activities Association (MSHSAA): baseball, boys and girls basketball, cheerleading, boys and girls cross country, dance team, field hockey, football, boys and girls golf, girls lacrosse, band and orchestra, scholar bowl, boys and girls soccer, softball, speech and debate, boys and girls swimming and diving, boys and girls tennis, boys and girls track and field, girls volleyball, water polo, and wrestling.

In addition to its current activities, Clayton students have won multiple state championships, including:

- Football: 2004
- Girls Tennis: 1985
- Boys Outdoor Track and Field: 1934, 1935
- Boys Indoor Track and Field: 1934, 1935, 1936
- Mock Trial: 2013, 2019
- Scholar Bowl: 2022
- Girls Soccer: 2023, 2025
- Boys Soccer: 2024
- Ice Hockey: Wickenheiser Cup 2024
- Roller Hockey: Division 3 2016

=== The Globe ===
The Globe, Clayton's student-run publication, is a forty page, full-color newsmagazine. The Globe is a member of the National Scholastic Press Association's Hall of Fame, as well as a winner of the Missouri Interscholastic Press Association's All-Missouri designation, Quill and Scroll's Gallup Award, Columbia Scholastic Press Association's Gold and Silver Crown, and NSPA's Pacemaker. The Globe is a national Top 100 publication as recognized by the National Scholastic Press Association. Staff members have been recipients of two Brasler Prizes (scholastic equivalent of the Pulitzer) and three Robert F. Kennedy Human Rights Award.

== Recognition ==
Clayton has been ranked among the top public high schools by Newsweek and has won national and state-level awards for quality. For the 1983–1984 school year, Clayton was nominated by the Missouri Department of Elementary and Secondary Education for the United States Department of Education Blue Ribbon school program; for the following year its nomination was accepted and it became nationally recognized. It was again named a Missouri Gold Star school in 1994–1995 and was nominated for the Blue Ribbon school program.

In 2011, Newsweek ranked Clayton as the 89th-best public high school in the United States, the highest in the state of Missouri. Newsweek again ranked Clayton in 2012 ranking 129 of the top 1,000 schools.

When Clayton sophomores participated in the Programme for International Student Assessment (PISA) in 2009, the school's average scores in science and reading were higher than the averages of all other participating countries, including the United States; its average score was second-highest as compared to participating countries in mathematics.

== Notable alumni ==
- Jairus Byrd, 2005, NFL Pro Bowl Safety, Buffalo Bills
- Andy Cohen, 1986, TV show host/personality, RHO and WWHL on Bravo
- Erin Daniels, 1991, actress
- Marc Elliot, 2004, motivational speaker, author, and member of NXIVM
- Jo Firestone, ca. 2005, comedian and actor
- Scott Foley, actor (Felicity, The Unit)
- Derrick Frost, 1999, NFL punter
- Rocco Landesman, 1965, award-winning Broadway producer
- Ryan McAdams, 2000, Fulbright Scholar and accomplished conductor
- Robert Stuart Nathan, 1966, television producer
- Peter Palmer, actor
- Louise Post, 1985, lead singer of the rock band Veruca Salt
- Claire Saffitz, 2005, pastry chef and host of Bon Appétit cooking show Gourmet Makes
- Kathryn Sansone, 1980, personal trainer and author
- Virginia Scharff, 1971, historian
- Louis Susman, 1955, Ambassador to the Court of St. James (England) 2009–2013
- David Isserman, 2001, American entrepreneur and conservationist; Knight of the Order of Saint Michael of the Wing
- Nicholas Worth, 1956, character actor
- Sid Wyman, 1927, gambler, and Las Vegas casino owner
- Jake Zimmerman, 1992, St. Louis County Assessor
