= Straub's Markets =

American specialty food retailer

Wm. A. Straub Inc.
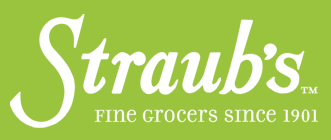
- Trade name: Straub's Fine Grocers
- Industry: Retail (Grocery)
- Founded: 1901
- Founder: William A. Straub
- Number of locations: 4
- Area served: Greater St. Louis
- Owner: Straub family
- Website: straubs.com

Straub's Markets (or Straub's Fine Grocers) is a specialty food retailer headquartered in downtown Clayton, Missouri founded in 1901 by William A. Straub.

== History ==
William A. Straub founded the company in 1901 in Clayton, Missouri. It sold ice cream at the 1904 St. Louis World's Fair and has four locations in the Greater St. Louis Area, having expanded from the original location in Webster Groves to Clayton in 1933, the Central West End in 1948, and Town and Country in 1966. According to the company, over 52 tons of its "World Famous Chicken Salad," are sold each year. The company is owned and operated by Jack W. "Trip" Straub III.

== Awards ==
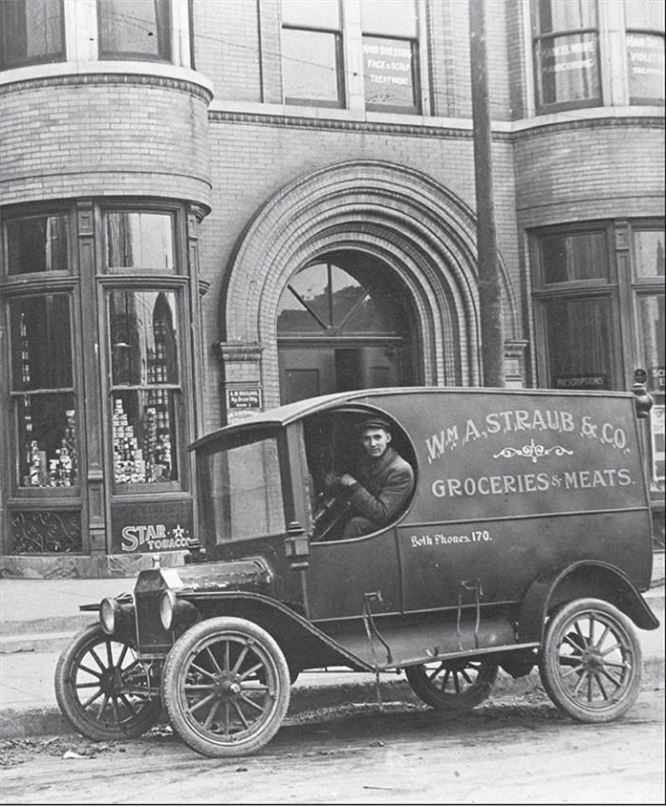
Straub's wagon in Webster Groves

- N.A.S.F.T. Retailer of the Year (2009, 2006, 2001)
- About.com's The Best Online Gourmet Shops #11
- Ladue News Platinum Award: Best Grocer (2011, 2010, 2009), Most Pleasing Grocery Experience (2008)
- Fox 2 Hot List: Best Gourmet Grocer (2010)
- Amazon.com Top Holiday Seller (2010, 2009)
- Sauce Magazine Reader's Choice Award: Best Butcher (2010, 2009, 2008, 2007, 2006, 2005)
- Riverfront Times Best of St. Louis (2012, 2006, 2005, 2003)
- Better Business Bureau World Class Customer Satisfaction Award (2002)
