= Oak Knoll Park =

Municipal park in Clayton, Missouri, U.S.

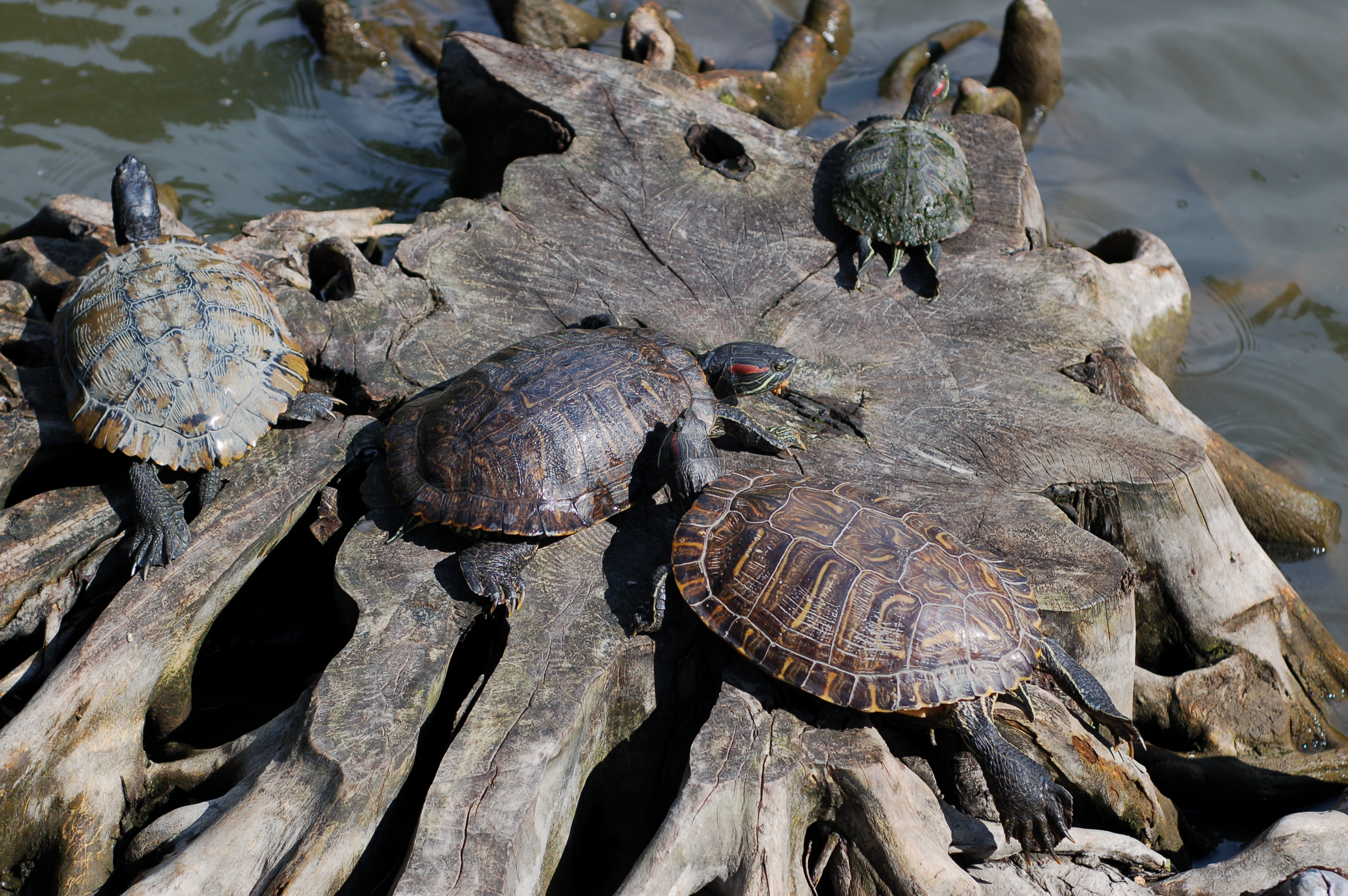
- Turtles sun themselves on a stump near the park's pond.
- Interactive map of Oak Knoll Park
- Location: Clayton, Missouri
- Nearest city: St. Louis
- Coordinates: 38°38′12″N 90°19′11″W
- Area: 14.5 acres (5.9 ha)
- Created: 1958
- Operator: City of Clayton, Missouri
- Public transit: MetroBus

Oak Knoll Park is a municipal park in Clayton, Missouri, a suburb of St. Louis. Founded in 1958, it includes 14.5 acres of land that host one of the largest native stands of post oak trees. It also includes two early 20th-century stone mansions.

In 1958, the Clayton Board of Aldermen authorized the purchase of a 21-acre tract of land at the northwest corner of Clayton Road and Big Bend Boulevard. City planners had recommended a purchase of land for the city's second municipal park, after Shaw Park, and this tract was deemed the only suitable candidate. Voters approved a $350,000 bond issue a few months later, and the land was ultimately purchased for $400,000. The tract included two stone mansions of about 20 rooms apiece, both built by prominent St. Louisans of their day: 1 Oak Knoll, built by Charles M. Rice and recently vacated by his widow, and 2 Oak Knoll, built by Alvin D. Goldman and then occupied by his widow, Blanche Lesser Goldman.

Oak Knoll Park was for several decades the site of the St. Louis Museum of Science and Natural History, an operation of the Academy of Science, St. Louis. In 1959, the academy installed part of its collection, by then a century old, in the park's mansions. The academy paid just $1 per year in rent, but was responsible for upkeep on the buildings. The museum, which was free to enter, was immediately popular with the public, but within a few years, the academy was struggling to fund its maintenance. Similar funding problems with the Saint Louis Zoo and the Saint Louis Art Museum led city leaders in 1969 to propose a tax levy to support all three institutions. When voters approved the levy in 1971, control of the museum and its collection passed to a Board of Commissioners. The museum was eventually closed and part of the collection was transferred to the new St. Louis Science Center, which opened in 1992.

In 2021, Clayton leaders announced that renovation of the pond area would be funded by a $150,000 gift.
