= Cassidy Turley =

American real estate firm

- Type: Private
- Industry: Commercial Real Estate Services
- Founded: 2010
- Defunct: January 5, 2015
- Fate: Acquired by DTZ, which was acquired by Cushman & Wakefield
- Headquarters: Washington, D.C.,
- Key people: Joseph Stettinius Jr. (CEO); Walter D. Pinkard, Jr. (chairman); Michael Kamm (president); Shelley Radomski (COO); John J. Fleury (CFO)
- Number of employees: 3,700 (February 2013)

Cassidy Turley was a privately owned commercial real estate services firm. Cassidy Turley was acquired by a private equity investment consortium backed by TPG Capital, PAG Asia Capital and Ontario Teachers’ Pension Plan. In January 2015, Cassidy Turley was acquired by DTZ, which was later acquired by Cushman & Wakefield. The combined DTZ business had more than 28,000 employees across 265 offices in 50 countries after the merger. Cassidy Turley was organized across service lines: capital markets, tenant representation, corporate services, project and development services, project leasing, property management and research and consulting. The firm operated industry practice groups in nonprofit, legal, food and beverage, hospitality and healthcare.

Cassidy Turley Research tracked key economic indicators with correlation to the local and national commercial real estate market:

- Forecasts of macroeconomic & market-specific variables
- Sensitivity analyses of demand/supply fundamentals
- Development cycle analyses
- Elasticity of demand based on current & future market dynamics
- Primary & secondary data analyses of 80 U.S. metropolitan markets
- Legislative issues
- Investment sales and leasing of Office, Industrial, Retail, and Multi-Family properties

Dedication to local communities was a stated Cassidy Turley Core Value.

Cassidy Turley incorporated sustainable real estate alternatives into other companies' businesses

== History ==
In 2008, four firms that had been with Colliers International—Colliers Turley Martin Tucker in the Central U.S.; Colliers Pinkard in Baltimore, Raleigh and Charlotte; Cassidy & Pinkard Colliers in Washington, DC; and Colliers ABR in New York City—merged to form a joint holding company. The four firms, part of the Colliers International network, continued to operate under their names and brands in each market, but consolidated leadership, with Mark Burkhart of Colliers Turley Martin Tucker becoming CEO of the holding company.

In early 2010, FirstService, parent company of Colliers International, merged the U.S. and global operations of Colliers and FirstService Real Estate Advisors. That same year, the holding company of Colliers Turley Martin Tucker, Colliers Pinkard, Cassidy & Pinkard Colliers and Colliers ABR – and Colliers Houston & Co. of New Jersey, NAI affiliate BT Commercial in Northern California, Grubb & Ellis BRE Commercial in San Diego and Phoenix – formed a new national company under the brand of Cassidy Turley. Soon after, CPS CORFAC in Santa Clara, CA joined Cassidy Turley as Cassidy Turley CPS.

During 2010 and 2011 Cassidy Turley added offices in Milwaukee, WI Denver, CO, Louisville, KY and Dallas and Houston, TX. In 2010, the firm formed an international partnership with GVA to provide services outside the U.S.

On September 6, 2011, Cassidy Turley completed its acquisition of the brokerage and property management business lines of Carter, a commercial real estate services firm headquartered in Atlanta. On September 15, 2011, Cassidy Turley announced its acquisition of FHO Partners, a commercial real estate brokerage and advisory firm in Boston.

Cassidy Turley opened its first Los Angeles office on April 30, 2012, when it hired four brokers from Transwestern to lead Cassidy Turley's growth in the city.

On Oct. 5, 2012, Cassidy Turley's board of directors unanimously elected Joseph Stettinius Jr. as the company's new CEO, replacing Mark Burkhart, who now serves as an advisor to the company. With Stettinius' election, Cassidy Turley effectively moved its national headquarters to Washington, DC, where he is based.

On Jan. 2, 2013, Cassidy Turley expanded its Florida presence by completing a merger with Tampa-based CLW Real Estate Service Group. The following week, Cassidy Turley promoted Michael Kamm, based in San Francisco, to president.

Cassidy Turley ranked 5th on the 2013 edition of Lipsey Co.'s annual survey of the Top 25 brands in commercial real estate.

In July 2013, the company announced plans to open a new office in downtown St. Louis initially with 30 employees in October, adding to the seven already in the region. It has 800 employees in the region presently with its main St. Louis office in the Clayton, Missouri suburb.

In September 2014, the company announced that it has entered into an agreement with an affiliate of DTZ Investment Holdings, backed by TPG, PAG Asia Capital and Ontario Teachers’ Pension Plan (the Consortium that agreed to acquire DTZ), to sell 100% of the equity interests of Cassidy Turley. The agreement is subject to customary closing conditions and is dependent on Cassidy Turley’s combination with the operations of DTZ Group (DTZ) to create a global, full-service commercial real estate services company. The Consortium’s acquisition of DTZ is currently scheduled to close in early November 2014. The acquisition of Cassidy Turley is expected to close December 31, 2014.

On January 5, 2015, DTZ, a global leader in commercial real estate services, announced that Cassidy Turley and DTZ are now operating as a single global firm following the completion of the acquisition of Cassidy Turley by the private equity investment consortium backed by TPG Capital, PAG Asia Capital and Ontario Teachers’ Pension Plan. The consortium acquired DTZ in November 2014.

== Affiliations ==
- Member, U.S. Green Building Council
- Partner, Energy Star
- Partner, University of Pennsylvania Wharton School of Business

== Awards ==
Industry

- 2014 Outlook Award presented to Kevin Thorpe by the National Association for Business Economics
- 2014 ENERGY STAR Partner of the Year
- 2013 Global Outsourcing 100 Leaders List
- 2013 ENERGY STAR Partner of the Year
- 2012 Greenest Companies Index in Commercial Property News
- Best Practices Index, Commercial Property Executive (2011)
- International Association of Outsourcing Professionals 2011 Global Outsourcing 100 Leaders List
- 3 Top Rebranding Strategy Examples, Social Media Verve (2018)
- "Most Powerful Brokerage Firms"
- "Property Management Brokerage Honors”
- Greenest Companies, Platinum (2011)
- 2011 Rebrand 100 Global Award

Work Environment

Individual offices named as one of the Best Places to Work:

- Baltimore
- Cincinnati
- Dallas
- Indianapolis
- Los Angeles
- Nashville
- New York City
- San Diego
- St. Louis
- Washington, DC

== See also ==
- DTZ
- CB Richard Ellis
- Jones Lang LaSalle
