= DeMun =

Historic place in St. Louis, Missouri, US

- Hi-Pointe–DeMun Historic District
- U.S. National Register of Historic Places
- U.S. Historic district
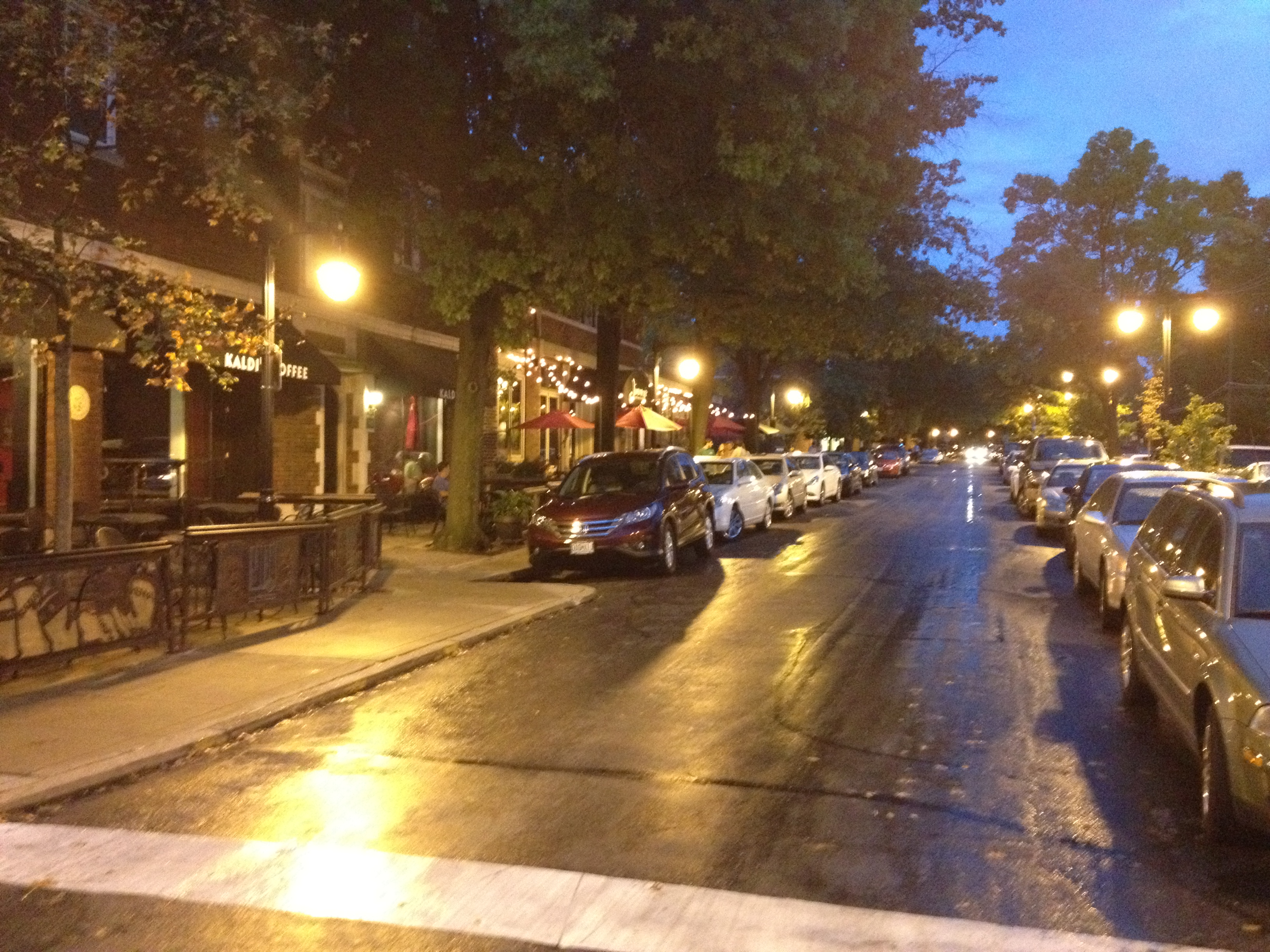

- Location within St. Louis Location within Missouri Location within the United States
- Location: Roughly bounded by Clayton Road to the south, Big Bend Boulevard to the west, Northwood Avenue to the North, and Skinker Boulevard to the east. Clayton, Missouri
- Coordinates: 38°38′14″N 90°18′31″W
- Area: 72.5 acres (29.3 ha) (original); 33 acres (13 ha) (increase)
- Architect: Wright, Henry; et al. (original); Pitzman Company; Barnett, H.A. (increase)
- Architectural style: Bungalow/Craftsman, Classical Revival, et al. (original); Mission/Spanish Revival, Bungalow/Craftsman, et al. (increase)
- NRHP reference No.: 05000370 (original); 06001207 (increase)

Significant dates
- Added to NRHP: May 7, 2005
- Boundary increase: March 22, 2007

The Hi-Pointe–DeMun Historic District is a historic district that was listed on the National Register of Historic Places in 2005. The district, commonly referred to as “DeMun,” is a neighborhood straddling the city limits of St. Louis, Missouri and Clayton, Missouri. The district is roughly bounded by Clayton Road to the south, Big Bend Boulevard to the west, Northwood Avenue to the north, and Skinker Boulevard to the east, and consists of two subdivisions: DeMun Park and Hi-Pointe.

In 2005, there were 441 buildings in the district deemed contributing to the historic character of the district, and nine other contributing sites, over a 72.5-acre (293,000 m^{2}) area. In 2007, the boundaries were increased to include an additional 33 acres (130,000 m^{2}) with 111 contributing buildings.

DeMun is described as one of the most historically significant neighborhoods in St. Louis, and as being “chock-full of 1920s architecture and peaceful, tree-lined streets.” The neighborhood's residents are a mix of families, young professionals, and students — typically graduate and professional students from nearby Washington University in St. Louis. DeMun is centrally located within the St. Louis metropolitan area and is described by Walk Score as one of St. Louis's most walkable neighborhoods.

In addition to Washington University, DeMun is adjacent to Forest Park and conveniently close to multiple movie theaters, grocery stores, large- and small-retail outfits, as well as the cultural attractions of the Delmar Loop in University City and the Downtown Clayton business hub. DeMun Avenue, in the heart of the neighborhood, is home to a number of restaurants, bars, coffee shops, and other retail, all within walking distance of one another, and frequented by a somewhat upscale clientele.

== History and design ==
The DeMun neighborhood was developed on land once owned by French fur trader Jules DeMun and his wife Isabelle Gratiot DeMun, the great-granddaughter of Pierre Laclède. The large tract deeded to the DeMun family by the King of Spain in colonial days was ultimately divided, with the eastern part sold under protest to the city of St. Louis for the establishment of, the western part sold in 1921 to the Lutheran Church-Missouri Synod to build Concordia Seminary, and the remainder sold and subdivided for the creation of the neighborhood that bears their name.

The district was designed by renowned American landscape architect and urban planner Henry Wright, and completed in 1923, after Wright's 1917 plan for the development. DeMun illustrates what would become known as Wright's “new town” philosophy and planning features. The neighborhood faced inward, away from the congestion and noise of major thoroughfares. Access from busy streets was limited, and streets were curved to deliberately slow and quiet automobile traffic. There were alleys for cars and service vehicles, and sidewalks to get to the shops, parks, and the school, all located within the self-sufficient community. To ensure land was used efficiently, structures were placed on small lots and people shared central green spaces. Considering the unique topography of the highest point in St. Louis, large multi-story buildings were placed at the bottom of the hill, and short ones at the top, yielding a visually appealing landscape and equal access to sunlight and air circulation. Finally, Wright encouraged the use of many traditional architectural styles and a limited variety of materials, so that structures were both consistent and unique.

== Character and architecture ==
Although both the DeMun Park and Hi-Pointe subdivisions were designed as public neighborhoods, there were restrictive covenants attached to their deeds. Wright was an original trustee for the Hi-Pointe subdivision, which had restrictive covenants until December 1999. The restrictions were designed to insure architectural consistency, maintain the residential nature of the area, provide a funding mechanism for maintenance of the parks, trees, and streets, and limit use of the property to those originally designated.

Because of the care taken in developing DeMun, the neighborhood maintains a high level of historic integrity. All but 8 of the 305 primary buildings in the district are within the Hi-Pointe–DeMun Historic District.

The neighborhood is characterized primarily by post-World War I brick and limestone architecture. In the multi-family areas of the district, buildings of similar size used similar plans, with individuality attained by changing the decorative tile roofs and brick patterns. The single-family neighborhood has a more eclectic collection of dwellings. However, the commonality of size, scale, and materials throughout DeMun, and in each distinct residential area, gives the neighborhood a sense of unity in design. The majority of the buildings have cut stone foundations with brickwork walls that are dark in color and vary from heavily textured to smooth faced brick. The brick varies in color including greens, tans, yellows, and browns. The brick is generally laid in an American common bond pattern. All colors are muted. The mortar colors vary. The predominant mortar color is black, however, brown, red, light gray and sand are also common. Accents on the buildings are created using limestone, terra cotta and bricks of different colors and textures. Many of the original roofs were terra cotta tiles — either red unglazed or green glazed. The other main material used in the roofs of the original buildings is slate. Many of the homes include leaded and art glass windows and doors. The garages matched the homes using the same brick, mortar, and in some cases roofing accents.

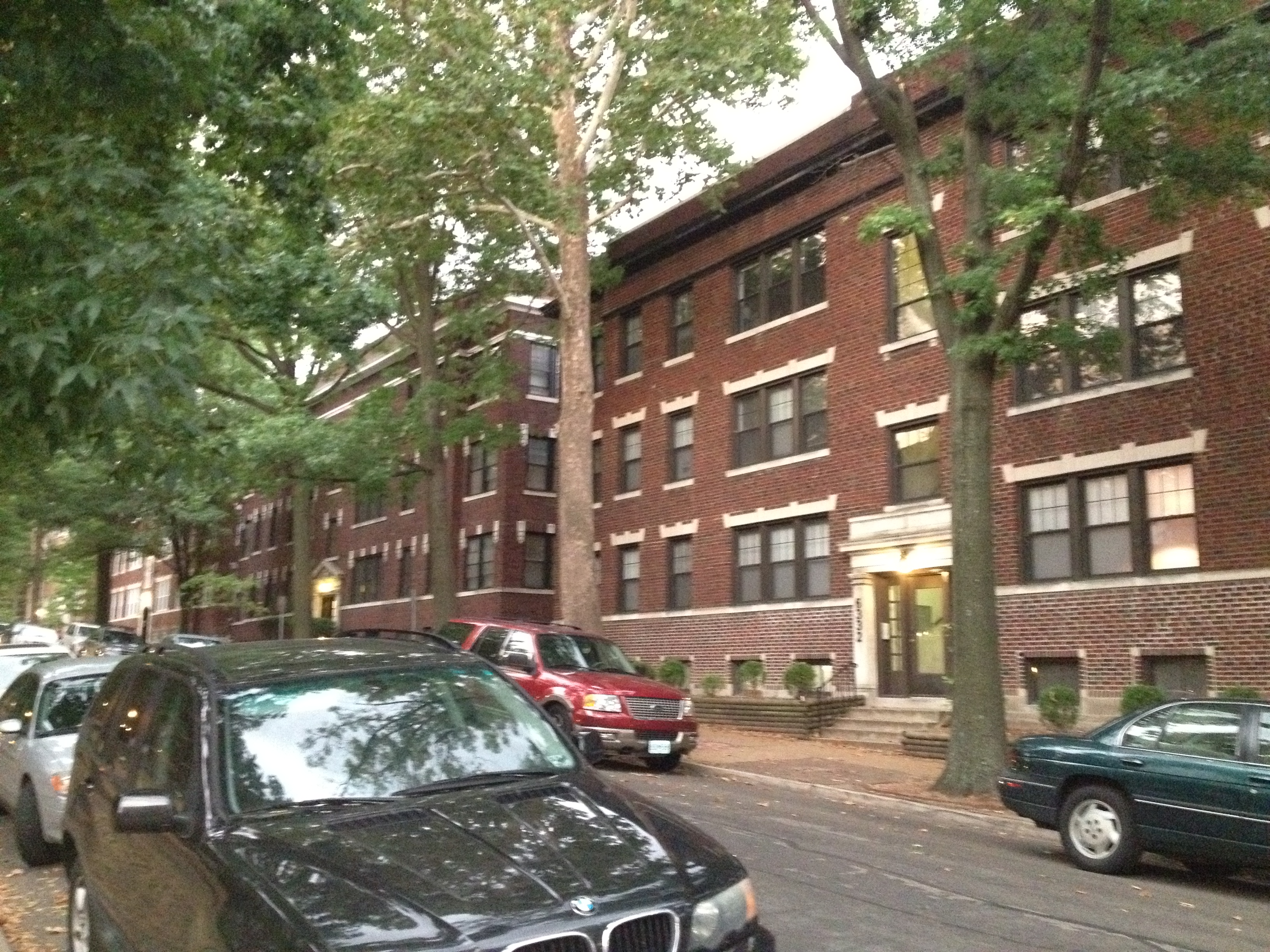
A typical DeMun apartment block.

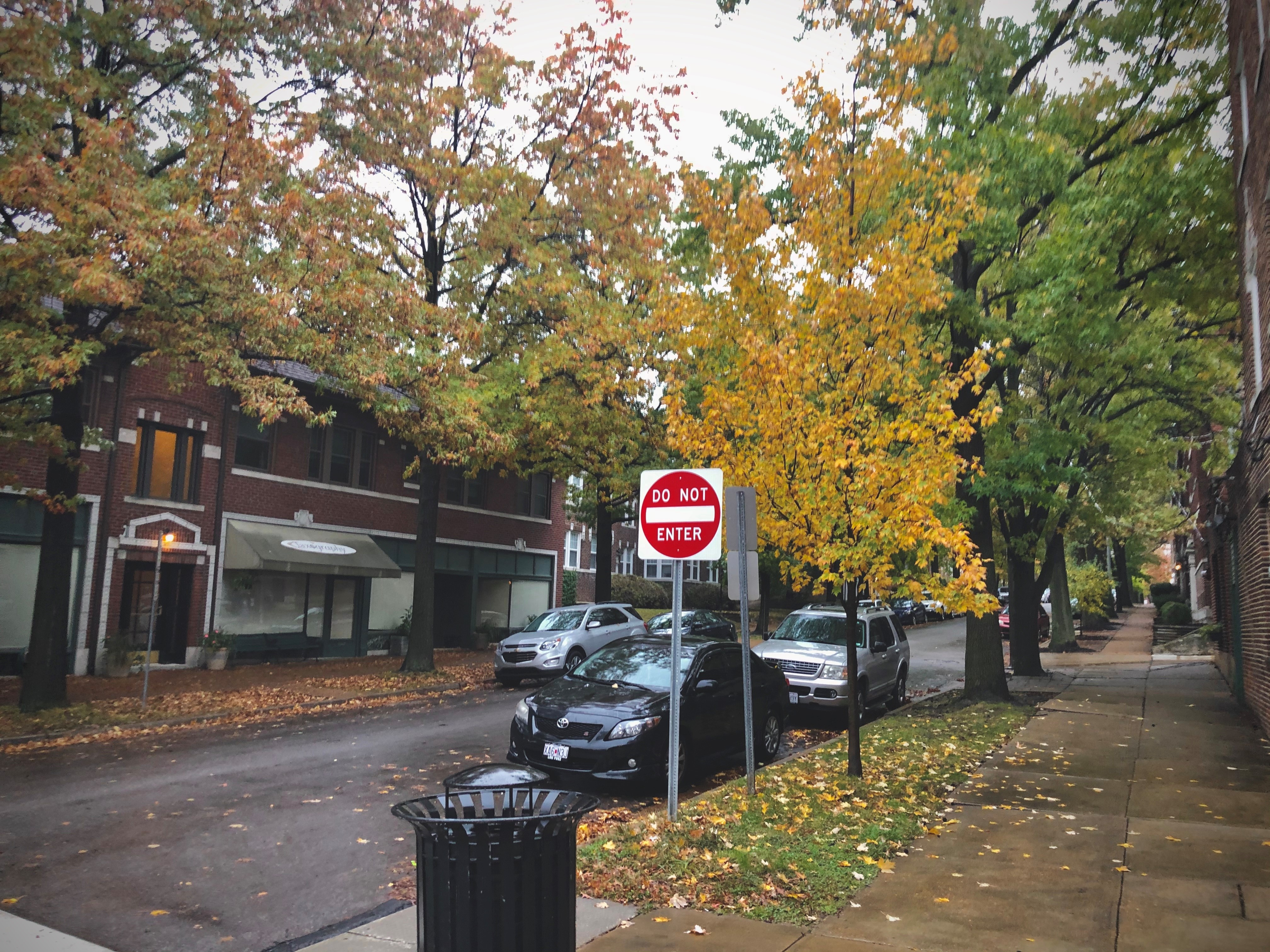
DeMun Historic District

== Neighborhood attractions ==
DeMun is located proximate to Washington University, Concordia Seminary, Fontbonne University, and to other St. Louis neighborhoods such as Dogtown, the Delmar Loop, and Skinker–DeBaliviere. Nearby attractions include the 1922-built Hi-Pointe Theater, Forest Park, the St. Louis Art Museum, and the St. Louis Zoo.
