= School District of Clayton =

School district in Missouri, U.S.

School District of Clayton includes all of Clayton, portions of Richmond Heights, and a portion of unincorporated St. Louis County, Missouri, US. The district is located immediately to the west of the City of St. Louis. Some areas have St. Louis postal addresses, though they are not in the city limits. As of 2017 the school district had 2,681 students, 278 staff, and 6 schools. There was an 11:1 student-teacher ratio.

The District, Clayton High School, Wydown Middle School, and Captain Elementary School also were ranked first in Missouri in their respective “best schools” rankings. Glenridge Elementary took the second spot in the Missouri ranking, followed closely by Meramec Elementary at number four.

== Schools ==
=== High school ===
- Clayton High School — grades 9–12. Clayton High School is highly rated academically. It was ranked by Newsweek as the 230th-best public high school in the nation in 2004, which was the 2nd highest in the state of Missouri. In 2011 it was ranked as the 89th best public high school in the nation and was 1st in the state of Missouri. As of January 2022, Clayton High School is rated number 2 best public school in Missouri by Niche. As of 2007, approximately 97% of all Clayton High Schoolers graduate High School, and go on to college. The school won the 2004 Missouri Class 4 state championship in football. The high school's mascot is the Greyhound, and its colors are orange and blue.

=== Middle school ===
- Wydown Middle School serves around 600 students in grades 6–8. The school opened in 1936, when the school district purchased Hosmer Hall, a private girls' school. The school served as a 9th-grade center until 1958 and an 8th-grade school from 1958 to 1965. A new Wydown Juior High was opened in 1965 for 7th and 8th-grade students in the district. Proposition W, a $39.4 million bond issue to fund the construction of a new school was approved by voters in April 2010. The current building was completed in spring 2014.

=== Elementary schools ===
- Ralph M. Captain Elementary School — grades K-5
- Glenridge Elementary School — grades K-5
- Meramec Elementary School — grades K-5

=== Early childhood education and parenting ===
- The Family Center — pre-K
