= Clayton Township, St. Louis County, Missouri =

Township in the US state of Missouri

Coordinates: 38°37′53″N 90°22′18″W

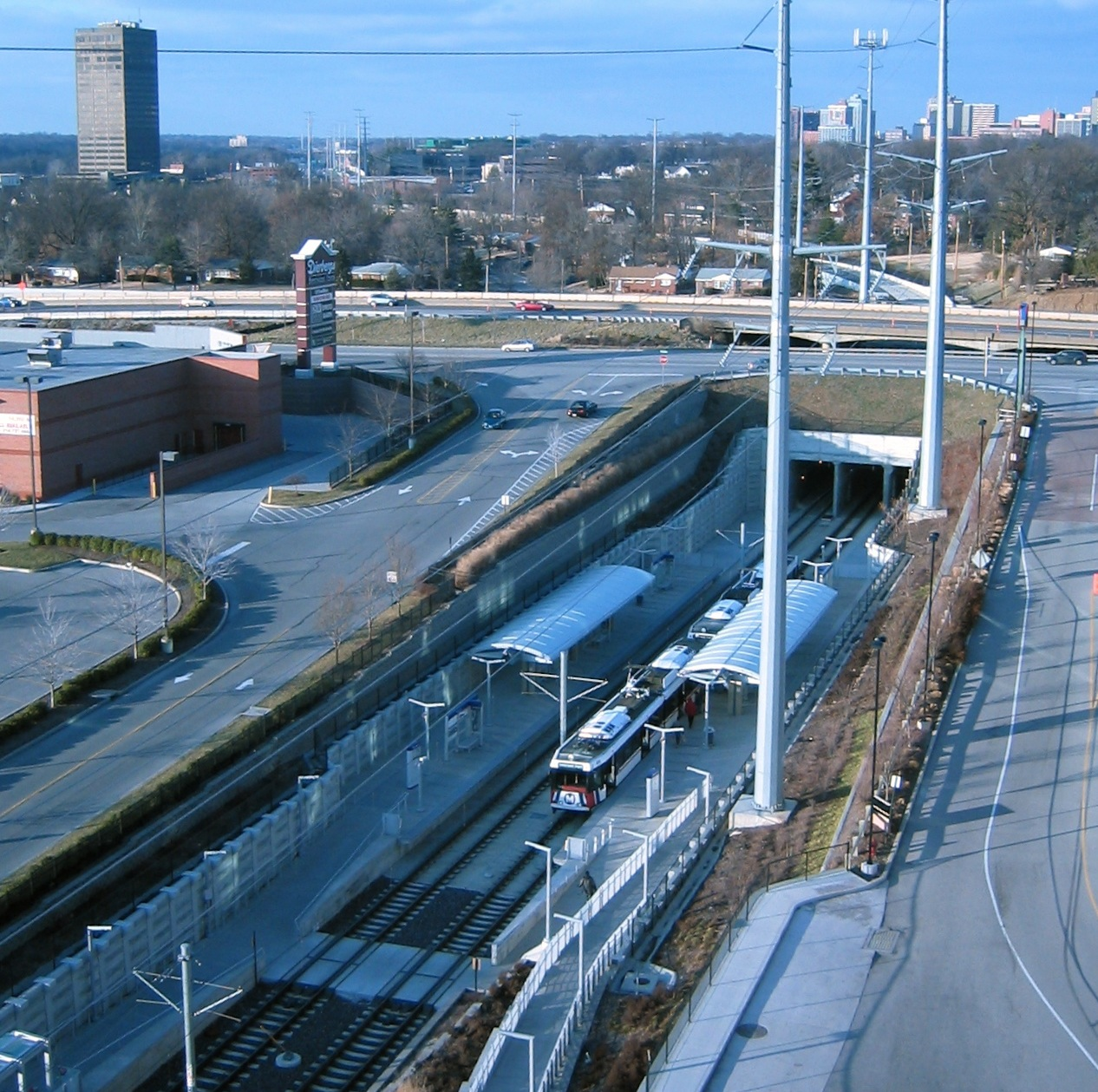

Clayton Township is a township in St. Louis County, in the U.S. state of Missouri. Its population was 35,446 as of the 2010 census.
