= Virginia Scharff =

American historian, author and academic

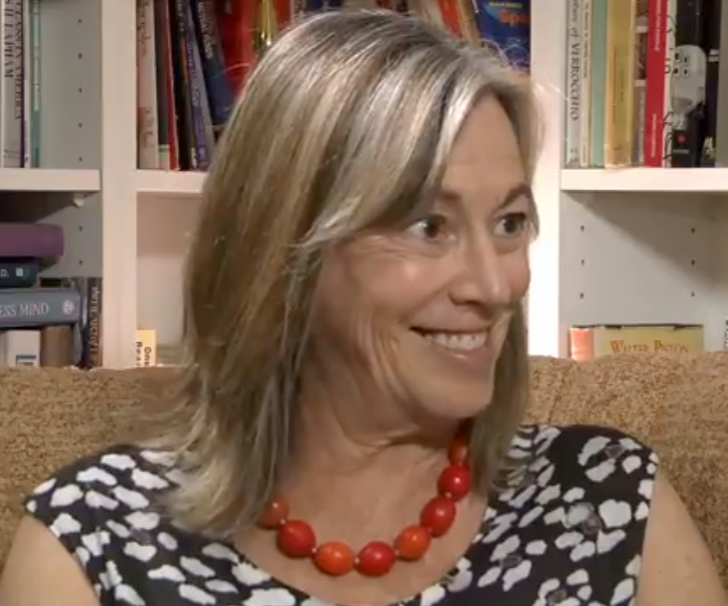
- Scharff in a 2013 interview
- Born: 1953 (age 72–73); St. Louis, Missouri, US
- Education: Yale University; University of California at Berkeley; University of Wyoming; University of Arizona
- Occupations: Historian, writer

Virginia Scharff (born 1953) is a historian, author who specializes in the history of women of the Western United States. She holds the position at the University of New Mexico as a Distinguished Professor Emeritus of History. Scharff also acts in the role of Chair of Western Women's History at the Autry Museum of the American West.

== Early life and education ==
Scharff was born in St. Louis, Missouri in 1953. She was one of the first female graduates of Yale University where she received a Bachelor of Arts degree in 1974. Additionally, she received a masters of journalism degree from the University of California at Berkeley in 1977, followed by a master's degree in history at the University of Wyoming in 1981, and a PhD in history from the University of Arizona in 1987.

== Career ==
Scharff is known for her research and writing on American history, in particular the history of women in the West. As an educator, she is Distinguished Emeritus Professor of History at the University of New Mexico, where she has also held the position of director of the Center for the Southwest, and as associate provost for faculty development.

Scharff is the author of several books, including Home Lands: How Women Made the West (with Carolyn Brucken) (2010). Scarff and Brucken also curated an exhibition of the same name at the Autry Museum of the American West which traveled to the New Mexico History Museum. The show examined various stereotypes of the West which has been long perceived as a vast "empty wilderness where men struggled against nature to transform the land". The curators presented a re-thinking of this perception to reveal the roles of women, focusing in particular on Native American women as well as immigrant women who made the West their home.

Twenty Thousand Roads: Women, Movement, and the West (2003) surveys the travels of women in the West ranging from the Native American explorer Sacagawea to the adventures of the rock and roll groupie and writer Pamela Des Barres, among others.

Scharff's 1991 book, Taking the Wheel: Women and the Coming of the Motor Age (1991), challenges the patronizing attitudes and stereotypes about "women drivers" while exploring the roles women played in design improvements to safety, comfort, and appearance of automobiles. Taking the Wheel was reviewed by Joseph J. Corn in the journal Technology & Culture, and by John H. Lenihan in the journal, The Historian.

Her book, The Women Jefferson Loved (2010), was reviewed in the New York Times. Andrea Wulf wrote in the Times that Scharff portrays Jefferson as a charming and passionate man, who also had a vulnerable side and who could be "hypocritical, difficult and demanding". Wulf at times critiqued Scharffs writing style and phraseology, for example, descriptions of complex personal relationships as "a little like trying to eat spaghetti with a knife." Catherine Kerrison, writing for The Virginia Magazine of History and Biography, states that the book "helps to bring into clearer focus women who have remained in the shadows" and argues that Scharff brings forward the ways in which women were key players in shaping Jefferson's life".

Sharff is also a novelist, having written the "Mustang Sally" series of suspense books Hello, Stranger (2006), Bye, Bye, Love (2004) Bad Company (2002), and Brown-Eyed Girl (2000). She writes in the suspense genre using the pseudonym Virginia Swift.

== Honors ==
In 2007, Scharff was a research fellow at the Huntington Library. In 2008 Scharff was an administrator for the Western History Association where she held the role of president. Additionally in that year, she was a fellow at the International Center for Jefferson Studies at Monticello. In 2008–9, she was Yale University's Beinecke Research Fellow affiliated with the Lamar Center for Frontiers and Borders. She is a fellow and a board member of the Society of American Historians, and at the Autry National Center she acts in the role of Chair of Western Women's History.

== Selected publications ==
- Taking the Wheel: Women and the Coming of the Motor Age. Free Press, 1991. ISBN 978-0826313959
- Seeing Nature Through Gender, (editor), University Press of Kansas, 2003. ISBN 978-0700612857
- Twenty Thousand Roads: Women, Movement, and the West. University of California Press, 2003. ISBN 978-0520237773
- Home Lands: How Women Made the West, (coauthored with Carolyn Brucken), University of California Press, 2010. ISBN 978-0520262195
- The Women Jefferson Loved, HarperCollins, 2010. ISBN 978-0061227073
- Empire and Liberty: The Civil War and the West, (editor), University of California Press, 2015. ISBN 9780520281264
