= George F. Hellmuth =

American architect (1907–1999)

George Hellmuth
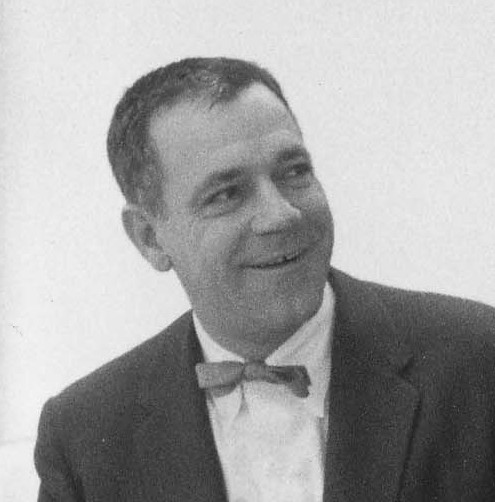
- Born: 1907
- Died: 1999 (aged 91–92)
- Education: Washington University in St. Louis
- Occupation: Architect

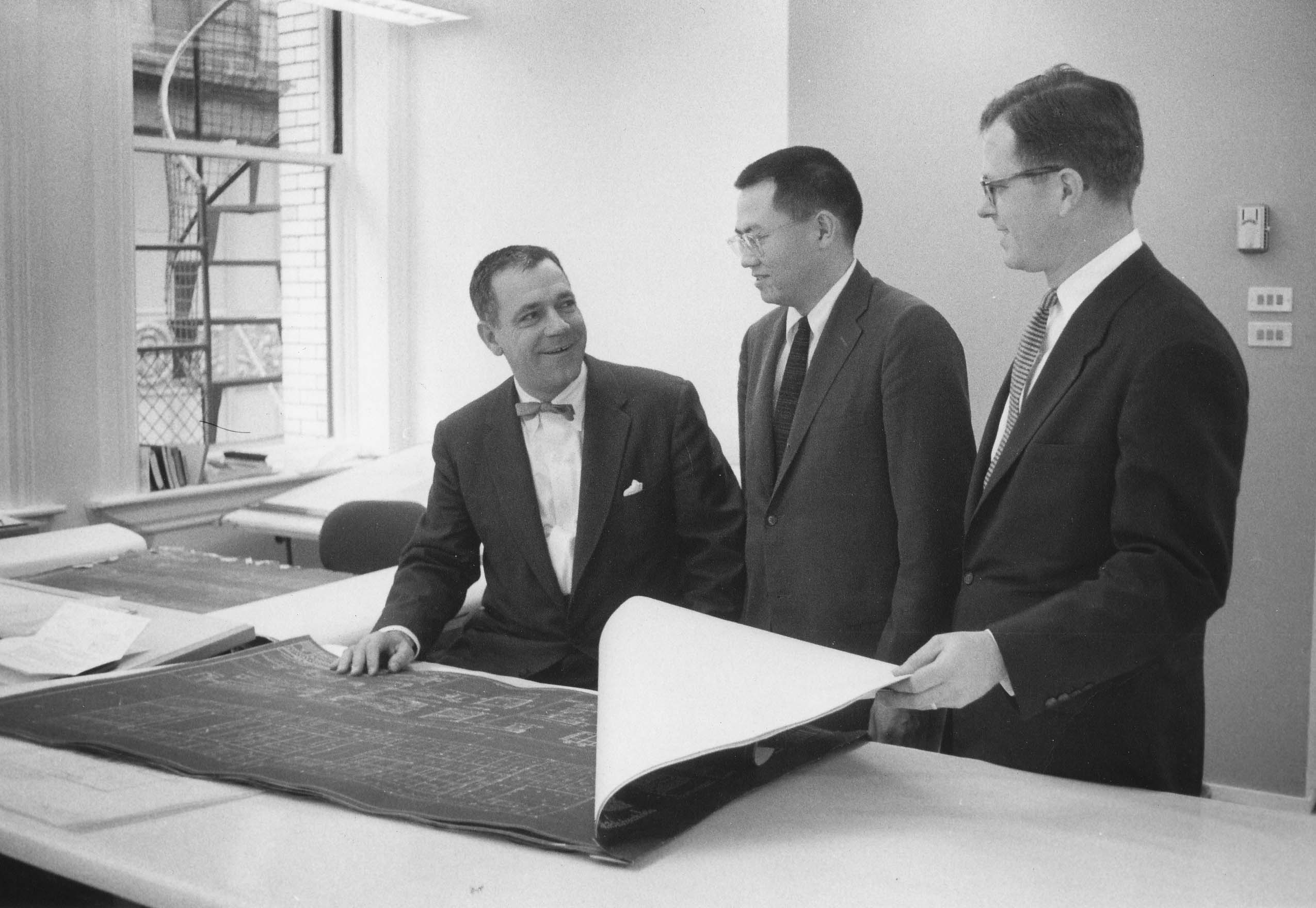
HOK founding partners George Hellmuth, Gyo Obata and George Kassabaum, 1956

George Francis Hellmuth (1907–1999) was an American architect based in St. Louis, Missouri.

Hellmuth was a native of St. Louis and son of architect George W. Hellmuth. He graduated from Washington University in St. Louis with a bachelor's degree in architecture in 1929 and a master's degree in 1930. He began his career as an architect of the city of St. Louis in 1932, designing civic structures including police stations and bus shelters. He went into private practice in 1949, founding Hellmuth, Yamasaki and Leinweber. In 1954, that firm was succeeded by Hellmuth, Obata and Kassabaum which became the modern firm HOK, which was, in 2018, the largest U.S.-based architecture-engineering firm. Its current president is Carl Galioto.

== Works ==
A number of his works are listed on the National Register of Historic Places.

Works include (with individual or shared attribution):

- Numerous police stations and bus shelters, when working as a city architect for St. Louis.
- Boatmen's Tower
- Lambert Field terminal
- Midcentury Modern-style apartment towers (1959–61) in Plaza Square Apartments Historic District, St. Louis, Missouri (Hellmuth, Obata & Kassabaum), NRHP-listed
- Metropolitan Square (1989) (attributed to Hellmuth, Obata & Kassabaum)
- Living World at the St. Louis Zoo (1989)
- Thomas F. Eagleton Federal Courthouse (2000)
- Southwestern Bell Telephone Building (attributed to Hellmuth, Obata & Kassabaum)
- Trans World Dome
- St. Louis Union Station (1985 rehabilitation)
- American Zinc, Lead and Smelting Company Building, aka American Zinc Building, 20 S. Fourth St., St. Louis, Missouri (Hellmuth, Obata & Kassabaum), NRHP-listed
