= Bill Hellmuth =

American architect (1953–2023)

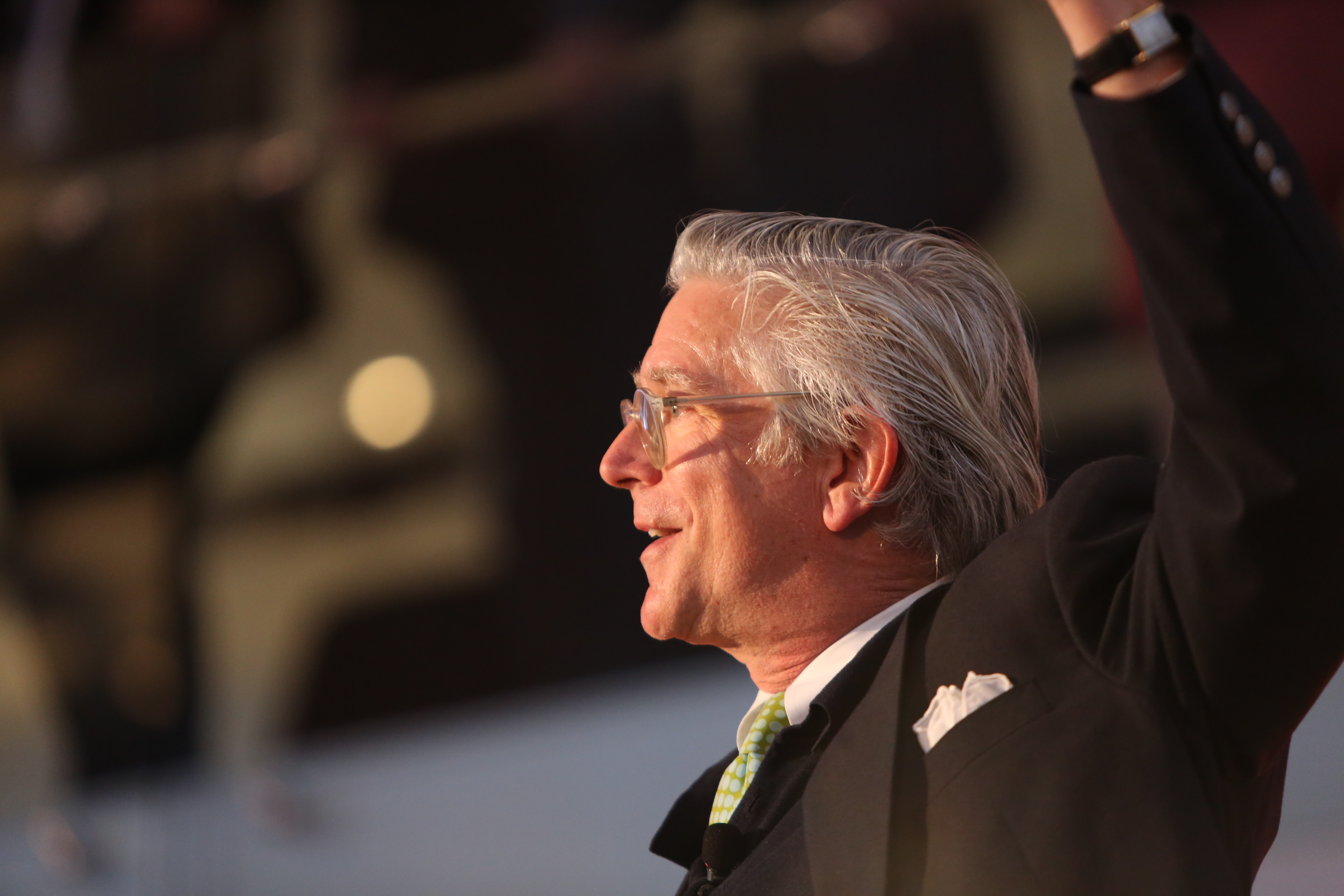
Hellmuth at HOK 60th anniversary (2015)

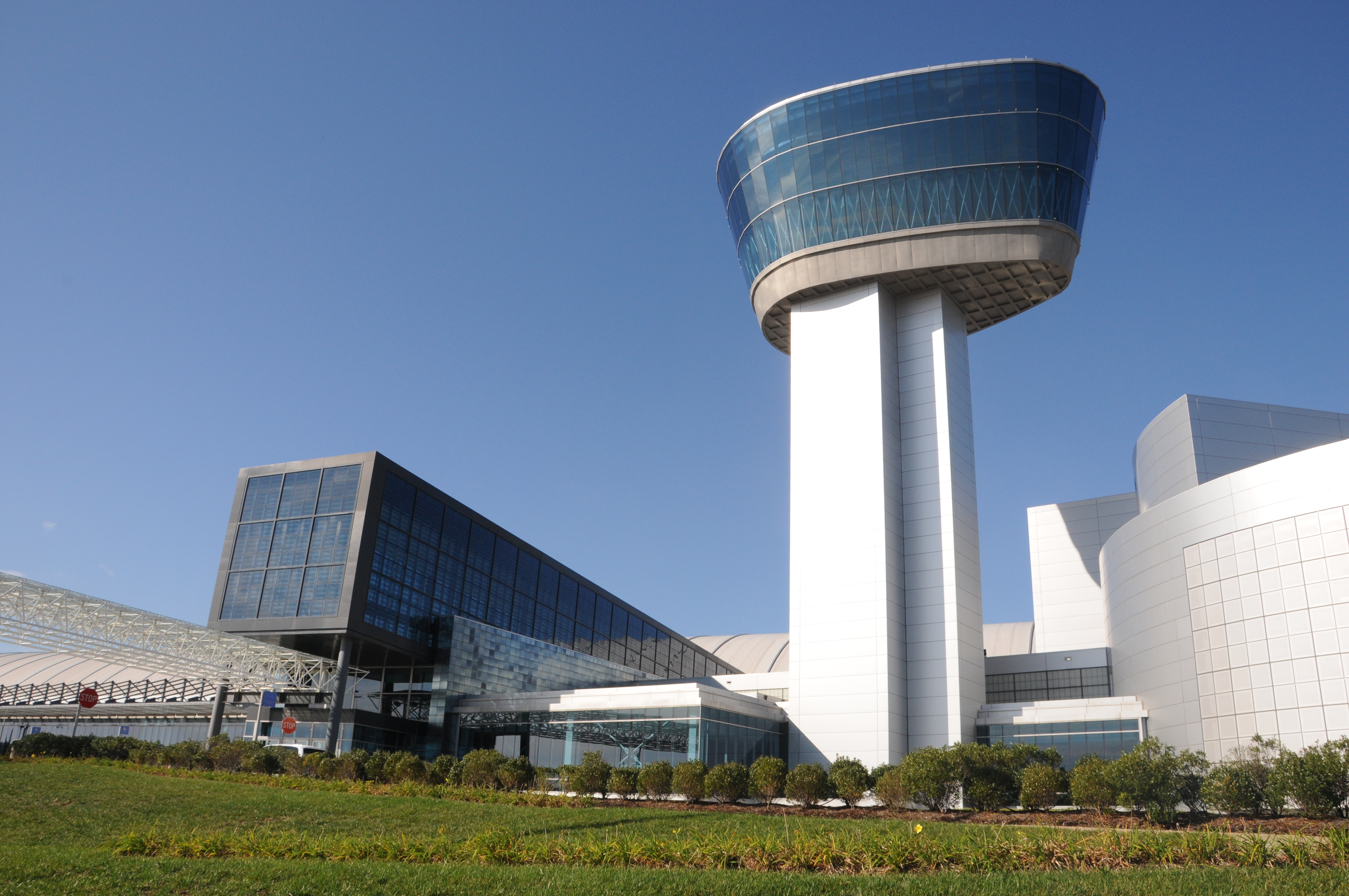
Steven F. Udvar-Hazy Center in Chantilly, Virginia

Bill Hellmuth (June 3, 1953 – April 6, 2023) was an American architect who designed several notable projects worldwide. Since 2005, he had been president of HOK, a global architecture, engineering and planning firm, while also heading its Washington, D.C., office.

In April 2016, Hellmuth succeeded Patrick MacLeamy as HOK's CEO while continuing to serve as the firm's president and design principal in Washington, D.C.

== Life and career ==
Hellmuth was a nephew of George F. Hellmuth, who founded HOK and its predecessor, Hellmuth, Yamasaki and Leinweber, in 1949.

Hellmuth received a Bachelor of Science (Architecture) degree from the University of Virginia, and, in 1977, a Master of Architecture from Princeton University, where he studied under Michael Graves. After leaving school, he joined Skidmore, Owings and Merrill. In 1991, he joined HOK (the "Hellmuth" in HOK was his uncle), and became president of the firm in 2005.

As a longtime champion of sustainable design, Hellmuth began integrating sustainability into projects long before LEED certification became commonplace.

In 2014, Hellmuth was named a Senior Fellow of the Design Futures Council, an interdisciplinary network of design, product and construction leaders.

Hellmuth was married and had two children. He died of glioblastoma on April 6, 2023, at the age of 69.

== Projects ==
Projects that Hellmuth has designed include:

- Greenland Dalian East Harbor Tower, Dalian, China (108 stories)
- Abu Dhabi National Oil Company Headquarters, Abu Dhabi, UAE (74 stories)
- King Abdullah Petroleum Studies and Research Center (KAPSARC) Residential Community, Riyadh, Saudi Arabia
- DC Consolidated Forensic Laboratory, Washington, D.C. (LEED Platinum)
- National Oceanic and Atmospheric Administration’s Center for Climate and Weather Prediction, Riverdale Park, Maryland
- Steven F. Udvar-Hazy Center, Chantilly, Virginia
- The Collection at Chevy Chase, Chevy Chase, Maryland
