= The Collection at Chevy Chase =

Coordinates: 38.9597°N 77.0857°W

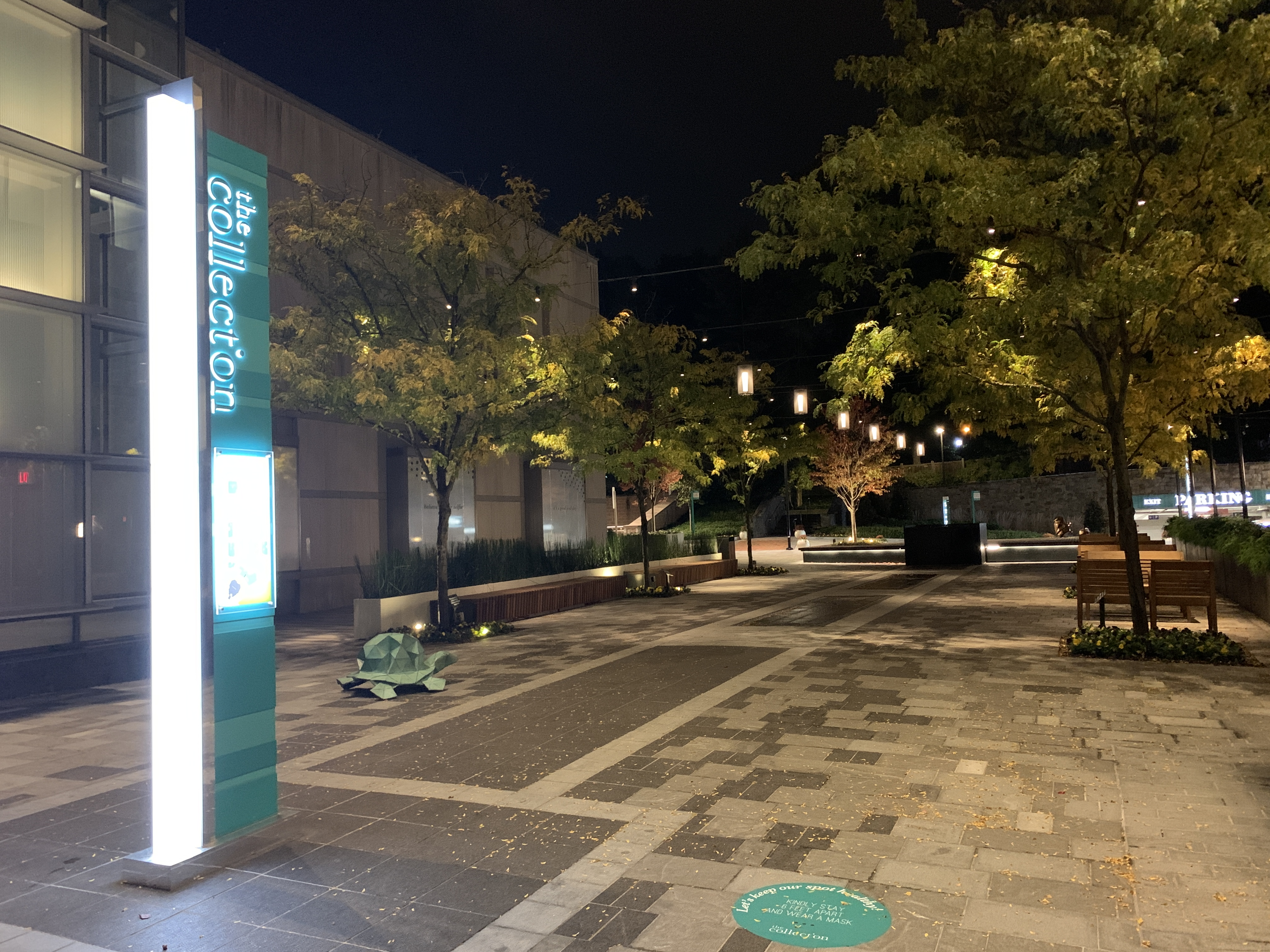
- Location: 5471-5481 Wisconsin Avenue; Chevy Chase, Maryland
- Opened: 2005
- Developer: The Chevy Chase Land Co.
- Architect: William Hellmuth, HOK
- Num. of stores: 14
- Floor area: 112,000 sq. ft.
- Website: collectionchevychase.com

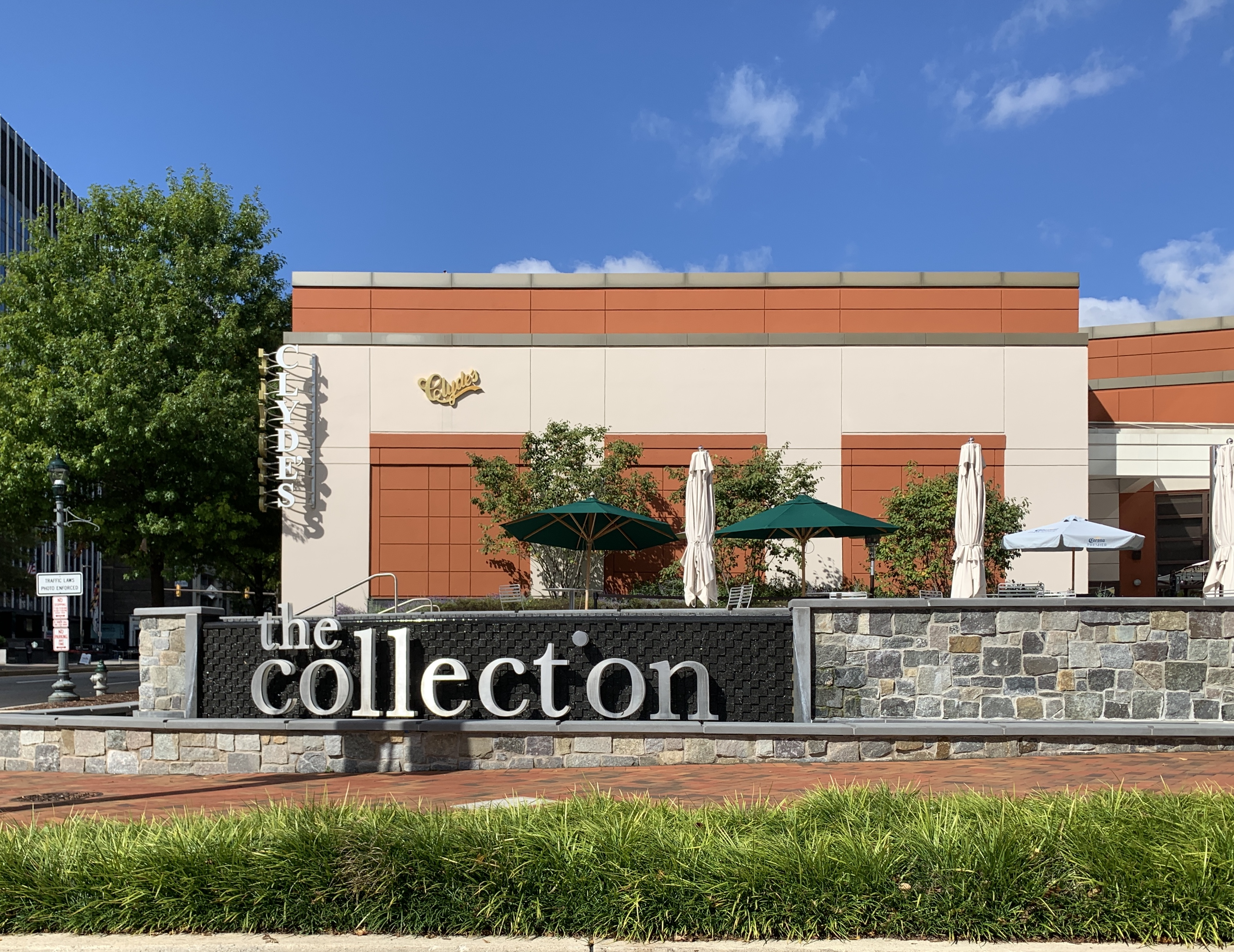
Sign for The Collection at Chevy Chase

The Collection is a mixed-use development and retail center in Chevy Chase, Maryland. The center is located along Wisconsin Avenue near the Washington, D.C.-Maryland border and is a part of the Friendship Heights commercial district.

The shopping center, whose first store opened in 2005, was developed by the Chevy Chase Land Company, a privately owned development corporation that has owned the land for more than a century.

== History ==
The land where The Collection now sits was acquired in the 19th century by the Chevy Chase Land Company, co-founded in 1890 by Francis G. Newlands. The company sold the parcel in 1903 to buyers who subsequently sold it to a straw buyer for African American investors with a plan to sell plots to other African Americans as part of a subdivision called Belmont. When Newlands and his partners learned of this, they helped to block the transfer of the land title. Two decades later, they successfully lobbied to erase the subdivision from the property books of Montgomery County, Maryland, and thereby regained the land.

In 1953, the company built a shopping strip on the site dubbed the Chevy Chase Center. In the 1970s, it was demolished, and for three decades, the land was a parking lot.

In the 1990s, the Chevy Chase Land Company began planning a new shopping center on the plot. This one would focus on luxury retailers, in an attempt to build on the success of nearby high-end department stores: Saks Fifth Avenue a block to the north, Bloomingdale's across the street, and Lord & Taylor a few blocks away.

It took a decade to bring The Collection project to fruition, due to community opposition and county zoning requirements. Designed by Bill Hellmuth, president of the global architecture firm HOK, the project was set on 112,000 sq ft (10,400 m^{2}) of land. It incorporates a 9,000 sq ft (840 m^{2}) park.

The first stores began opening in the $165 million complex in the latter part of 2005, and the center held a grand opening celebration on May 4, 2006. Model Petra Němcová and Chris Matthews were among the featured guests at the opening party. The original tenants included Ralph Lauren, Barneys CO-OP, Cartier, Dior, Piazza Sempione, BVLGARI, Gucci, Louis Vuitton, Jimmy Choo, and Tiffany & Co.

In its early years, The Collection and its section of Wisconsin Avenue were sometimes called Washington's version of Rodeo Drive.

But after 2008, the shopping center's profits began to wane. Piazza Sempione closed in April 2011 and was replaced by Mexican restaurant Mi Cocina, which closed in November 2014. Barneys CO-OP closed in 2012. Dior, Gucci, and Louis Vuitton closed in 2016.

By then, the Chevy Chase Land Company was already planning an expansion of The Collection, as well as a shift to more casual stores and restaurants. The shopping center was updated between 2017 and June 2019, adding outdoor restaurant seating and a tiered plaza. Total retail space rose to 194,646 square feet.

As of 2025, tenants include Amazon Fresh, Porsche, Tiffany & Co., Clyde's, Brooks Brothers, and others.
