= George Kassabaum =

American architect (1920–1982)

George E. Kassabaum
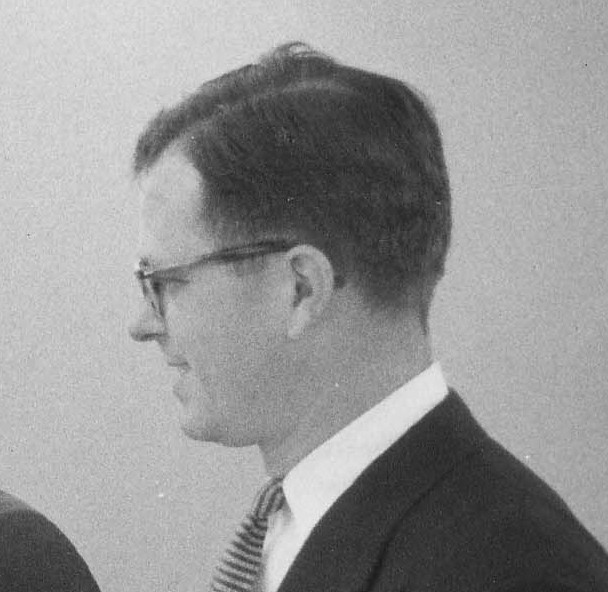
- Kassabaum in 1956
- Born: December 5, 1920; Atchison, Kansas, U.S.
- Died: August 14, 1982 (aged 61); St. Louis, Missouri, U.S.
- Education: Washington University in St. Louis
- Occupation: Architect
- Spouse: Marjory Verser Kassabaum Graff
- Buildings: Mobil Oil headquarters in Virginia; National Air and Space Museum in Washington, DC; Ralston Purina headquarters; Lambert-St. Louis International Airport terminal; Southern Illinois University campus at Edwardsville
- Website: www.hok.com

George E. Kassabaum (December 5, 1920 – August 14, 1982) was an American architect, and one of the co-founders of the HOK architectural firm.

== Early life ==
George Edward Kassabaum was born in Atchison, Kansas. He was the only child of George Kassabaum and Dorothy Kassabaum. From a very young age he expressed an interest in becoming an architect. He graduated from Classen Senior High School in Oklahoma City in 1938.

He attended Washington University in St. Louis where he met his future partners, George Hellmuth and Gyo Obata. He earned both a bachelor's and master's degrees in architecture before graduating in 1947.

Kassabaum graduated in 1947 and began working for a local architecture firm in St. Louis founded by two faculty members of Washington University.

== Career ==
In 1955, he co-founded Hellmuth, Obata + Kassabaum, now known as HOK.

He was national president of the American Institute of Architects from 1968 to 1969, and served as the 16th Chancellor of the AIA College of Fellows from 1978 to 1979.

== Honors ==
- AIA Fellowship, 1967
- Honorary Fellow, Royal Architectural Institute of Canada, 1969
- Honorary Fellow, La Sociedad de Arquitectos Mexicanos, 1969
- Honorary Fellow, La Sociedad Columbiana de Arquitectos, 1969
- Washington University Alumni Citation, 1972
- Missouri Architect of the Year Award, 1978

== Philanthropic service ==
Kassabaum was a board member of Washington University and an Eliot Society president.

== Personal life ==
Kassabaum married Marjory Verser in 1949. The couple had three children: Douglas, Anne, and Karen.

Kassabaum died at Barnes Hospital, St. Louis, on August 14, 1982, at the age of 61, having suffered a stroke three days earlier at his home in Ladue, a suburb of St. Louis.
