= Evans & Dixon =

American law firm

Evans & Dixon, L.L.C.
- Headquarters: One Metropolitan Square; Saint Louis, Missouri
- No. of offices: 7
- No. of attorneys: 100
- No. of employees: 200 (estimate)
- Major practice areas: workers' compensation, labor and employment law, civil liability defense, business law, large-loss subrogation, collections
- Date founded: 1945
- Founder: John F. Evans and John R. Dixon
- Website: www.evans-dixon.com

Evans & Dixon, L.L.C. is an American law firm engaging in the practice of workers' compensation, labor and employment law, civil liability defense, healthcare, collections, intellectual property, and various business law areas. Founded in 1945, Evans & Dixon is headquartered in St. Louis with offices in Kansas City MO, Springfield MO, Columbia MO, Overland Park KS, Omaha NE, and Chicago IL.

== Overview ==
Evans & Dixon, L.L.C. offers legal coverage in the areas of labor and employment law, workers' compensation defense, healthcare, insurance defense, collections, corporate law, M&A, intellectual property law and property subrogation among numerous other areas. In March 2009, the firm merged with Amelung, Wulff, Willenbrock & Pankowski, P.C., bringing its total attorney count to 75. Evans & Dixon has six offices and serves the states of Missouri, Illinois, Kansas, Nebraska and Iowa. Evans & Dixon is managed by member, Timothy Tierney and an executive member board. Greg Godfrey serves as the law firm’s chief financial officer. Today the firm has a total of 90 attorneys.

== Practice Groups ==
Civil Litigation – Appellate Resources and Business Litigation; Collections; Labor and Employment Law Practice; Subrogation; Workers’ Compensation and Employers’ Liability – Workers’ Compensation Subrogation; Business Law - Mergers & Acquisitions, Real Estate Law, Environmental Law, Trusts & Estates; Intellectual Property.
