= Rogers Park, Brampton =

Business complex in Brampton, Ontario, Canada

Coordinates: 43.7033°N 79.7162°W

Rogers Park, Brampton (formerly Nortel Brampton Centre and Northern Electric Brampton Works) is a business complex and the corporate offices of Rogers Communications in Brampton, Ontario. It is not the company head office, which is located in downtown Toronto.

Located at 8200 Dixie Road, the building was acquired by Rogers in 2006 from Nortel, which used the building as their global headquarters since 1997. The building, designed by Texas-based architects HOK Hellmuth, Obata + Kassabaum and constructed by Jackson-Lewis, has 1,000,000 square feet (93,000 m^{2}) of space on 63 acres of land. The building houses 5,000 Rogers staff.

The site was once Nortel's manufacturing facilities (Bramalea Works), built in 1963 for Northern Electric which became Northern Telecom in 1976 and Nortel Networks in 1999, and remodelled after 1996 to accommodate staff from their Mississauga, Ontario headquarters.

This is Rogers' second building bought from companies that failed or are failing. The headquarters Rogers Building was acquired from bankrupt Confederation Life. Rogers Park was acquired from the liquidation of Nortel's assets.
