= Plaza Square Apartments Historic District =

Historic district in Missouri, United States

- U.S. National Register of Historic Places
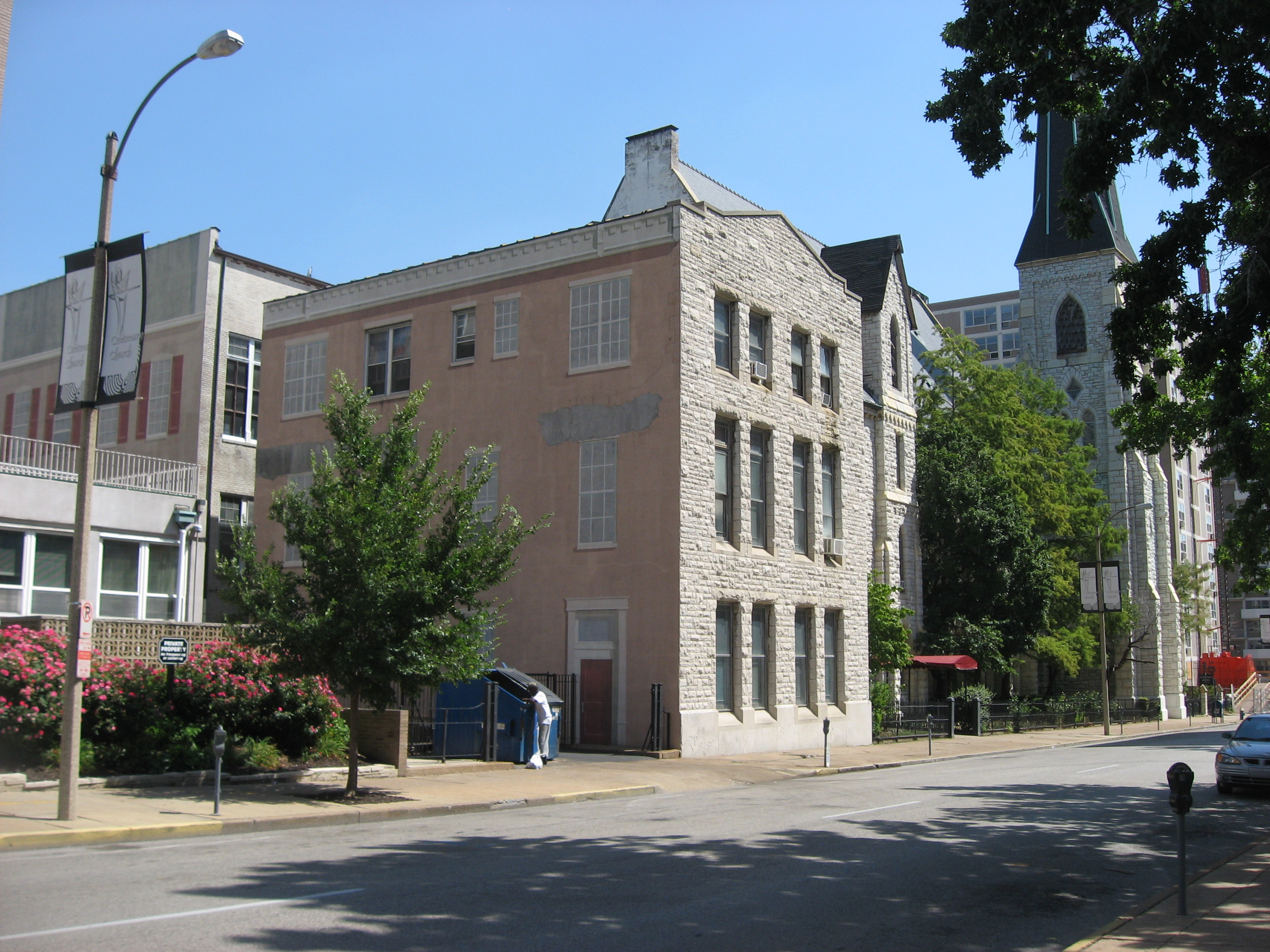
- Photo of office wing to church? Need photo of towers

- Location within Missouri Location within the United States
- Location: Bounded by 15th, Olive, 17th & Chestnut Sts., St. Louis, Missouri
- Coordinates: 38.630278°N 90.204444°W
- Area: 4 acres (1.6 ha)
- Architect: Hellmuth, Obata & Kassabaum, etal.
- Architectural style: Modern Movement, Late Victorian
- NRHP reference No.: 07000705
- Added to NRHP: July 12, 2007

The Plaza Square Apartments Historic District, in St. Louis, Missouri, is a historic district which was listed on the National Register of Historic Places in 2007. The listing included eight contributing buildings on 4 acres (1.6 ha).

The district includes six 13-story Modern Movement apartment buildings and two historic churches. The apartment buildings were constructed during 1959 to 1961 "from plans by Hellmuth Obata & Kassabaum with Harris Armstrong." One of the churches has an office wing and/or a rectory?

One of the churches is Centenary Methodist Episcopal Church, South, which was already separately listed on the National Register.

Location: Bounded by 15th St., Olive St., 17th St. & Chestnut St. St. Louis, MO
Date added: July 12, 2007
Architect: Hellmuth, Obata & Kassabaum; et al.
Architecture: Modern Movement, Late Victorian
Historic function: Domestic; Education
Historic subfunction: Multiple Dwelling; School
Criteria: event, architecture/engineering
