= Rogers Building (Toronto) =

Corporate campus of Canadian media conglomerate Rogers Communications

Coordinates: 43.669788°N 79.37945°W

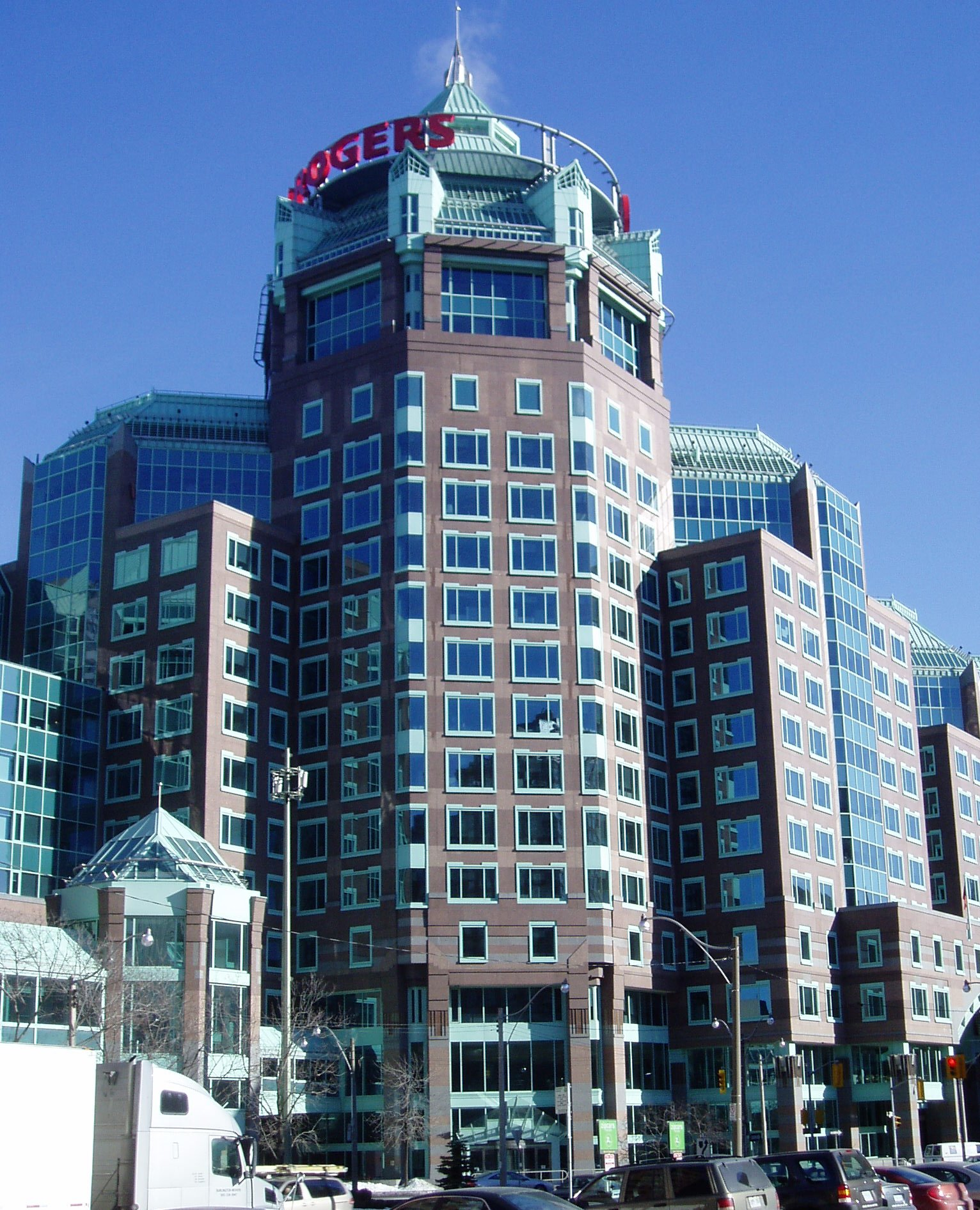
- The Rogers Building in 2007

General information
- Type: commercial office
- Architectural style: postmodernism
- Location: 1 Mount Pleasant Road, Toronto
- Construction started: 1990
- Completed: 1992

Height
- Height: 59 m (193.6 ft)

Technical details
- Floor count: 17
- Lifts/elevators: 10

Design and construction
- Architect: Zeidler Roberts Partnership

The Rogers Building, located in Toronto, Ontario, Canada, is part of the corporate campus of Canadian media conglomerate Rogers Communications, as well as the home of most, but not all, of the company's Toronto operations.

The facade walls of the postmodern building are light pink, with light green roof and light green window frames.

== Overview ==
Located at 1 Mount Pleasant Road / 1 Ted Rogers Way (formerly 777 Jarvis Street) and 333 Bloor Street East, the complex occupies almost all of the block bounded by Jarvis, Bloor, Huntley and Isabella streets. Mount Pleasant Road divides the northwest corner of the block from the remainder of the site, but Rogers occupies separate buildings on both sides of Mount Pleasant which are connected by a bridge and a tunnel. Collectively, all of the interconnected buildings (in addition to nearby buildings at 333 and 350 Bloor Street East) are referred to as the Rogers Corporate Campus.

Rogers acquired various parts of the block over time, as expansion of the facility was planned and executed. Part of the facility's parking garage now occupies the location once used by the original studios of 100 Huntley Street. The Rogers Building was originally built as the new head office of the now defunct Confederation Life insurance company, which became insolvent in 1994.

In 2002, the building received a major expansion.

The company's cable television and magazine publishing operations, as well as its local radio stations (including CFTR and CHFI-FM), operate from 333 Bloor Street East. Sportsnet is the latest addition to the complex, launching their new studios on April 30, 2008.

Rogers-owned Toronto television stations CityNews 24/7, CFMT-DT (Omni Television), CJMT-DT (Omni Television), and CITY-DT (Citytv) were based at 33 Dundas Street East, located at Victoria and Dundas streets; on March 17, 2025, all four operations relocated to the Rogers Building.

The Shopping Channel is based at a separate facility in Mississauga, Ontario.

== See also ==
- Rogers Park, Brampton
