= Gyo Obata =

American architect (1923–2022)

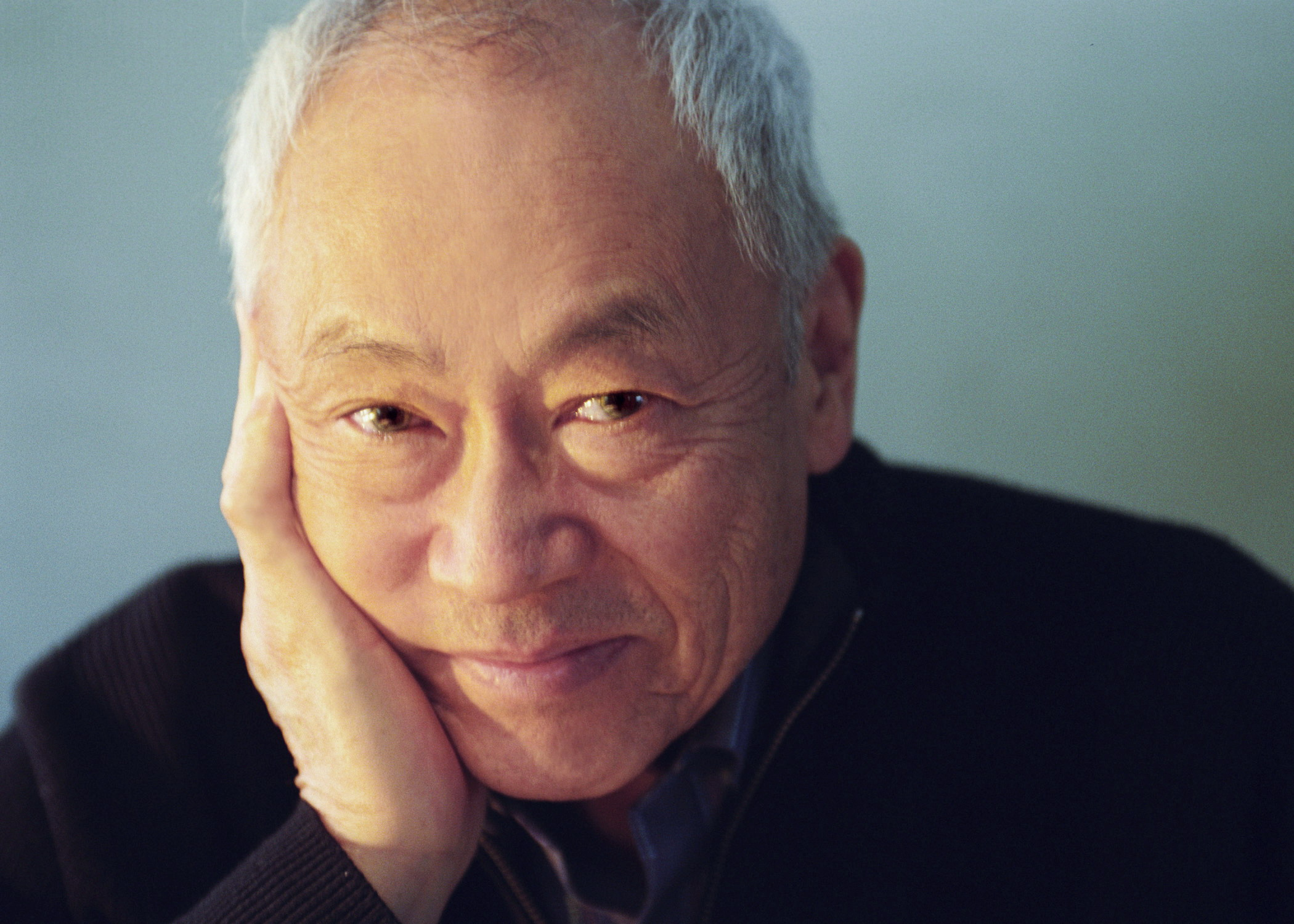
- Obata in 2005
- Born: February 28, 1923; San Francisco, California, U.S
- Died: March 8, 2022 (aged 99); St. Louis, Missouri, U.S.
- Education: University of California, Berkeley (undergraduate attendee); Washington University in St. Louis
- Occupation: Architect

Gyo Obata (小圃 暁, February 28, 1923 – March 8, 2022) was an American architect, the son of painter Chiura Obata and his wife, Haruko Obata, a floral designer. In 1955, he co-founded the global architectural firm HOK (formerly Hellmuth, Obata + Kassabaum). He lived in St. Louis, Missouri, and worked in HOK's St. Louis office. He designed several notable buildings, including the McDonnell Planetarium and GROW Pavilion at the Saint Louis Science Center, the Independence Temple of the Community of Christ church, the National Air and Space Museum in Washington, D.C., and the Abraham Lincoln Presidential Library and Museum in Springfield, Illinois.

== Biography ==
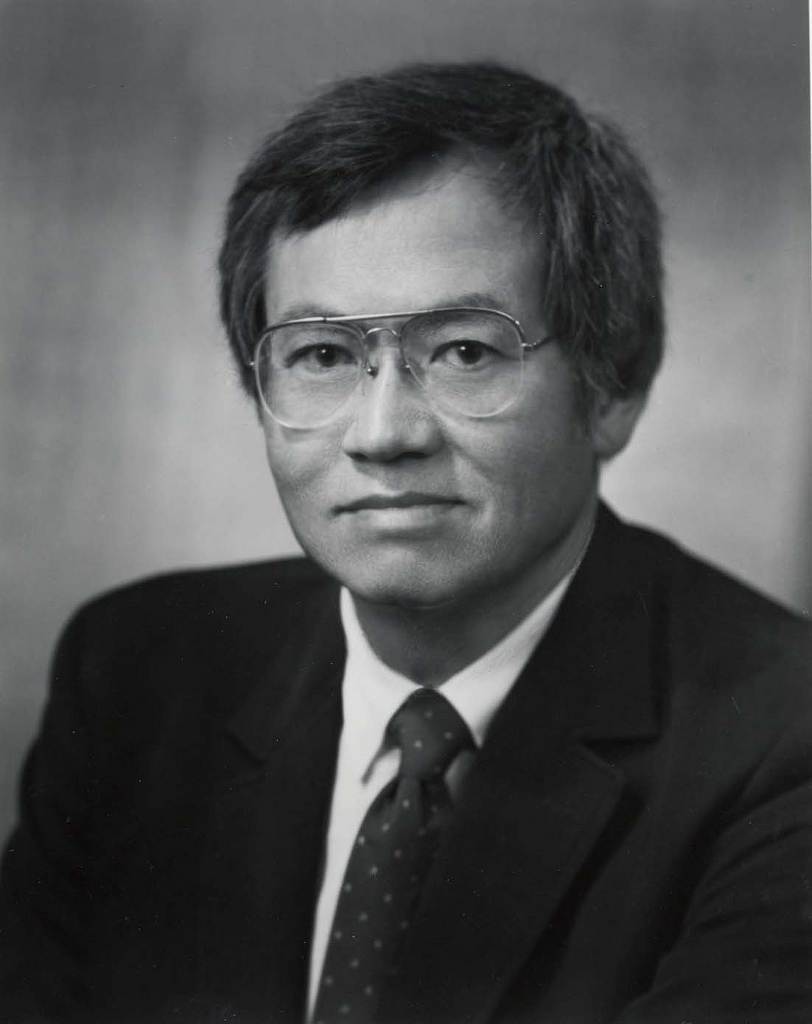
Obata in 1980

Obata was born and raised in San Francisco. Due to his family's Japanese heritage, he was nearly incarcerated with other Japanese-Americans during World War II. Though his family was sent to a concentration camp, he avoided it by leaving the School of Architecture at the University of California, Berkeley, to study architecture at the School of Architecture at Washington University in St. Louis, the only university in the United States willing to accept Japanese nationals at that time. He earned his bachelor of architecture degree there in 1945.

He then studied under master Finnish architect Eliel Saarinen at the Cranbrook Academy of Art in Bloomfield Hills, Michigan, receiving his master's degree in architecture and urban design in 1946.

After serving in the U.S. Army from 1946 to 1947 and working as an architect in the Chicago office of Skidmore, Owings and Merrill from 1947 to 1951, Obata returned to St. Louis in 1951 to join the firm of Minoru Yamasaki (who would later design the World Trade Center towers), another Nisei architect. Four years later, in 1955, he joined architects George Hellmuth and George Kassabaum in establishing the St. Louis-based architecture firm Hellmuth, Obata and Kassabaum.

Due in part to Obata's prowess and growing reputation, the firm achieved global renown, and Obata himself has won numerous awards for his designs. Today, HOK has more than 1,800 employees in 23 offices worldwide.

In 2010, Obata was featured in a book written by Marlene Ann Birkman and published by The Images Publishing Group titled, Gyo Obata: Architect | Clients | Reflections. The book features 30 of Obata's projects (and clients) spanning five decades.

Obata's design philosophy is "to provide spaces which are not only functional, but also enhance the quality of life for those who work and live in them." In Gyo Obata: Architect | Clients | Reflections, he says that, "The language that architects use to define space is daylight. Each project offers new potential for discovery, for understanding the site and program, and an opportunity to do a thoughtfully designed building that will bring meaning and enjoyment to the people who will occupy it."

Obata died in St. Louis, Missouri, on March 8, 2022, at the age of 99.

== Projects ==
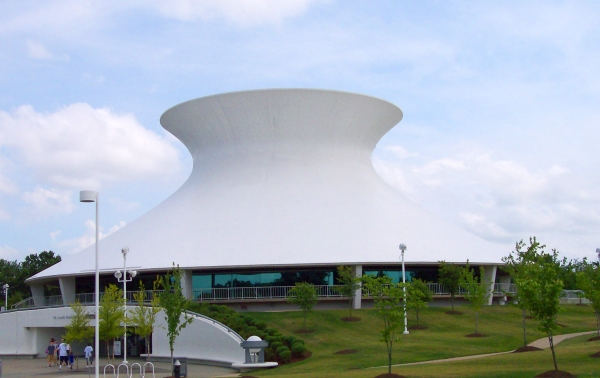
The James S. McDonnell Planetarium, a thin-shell and hyperboloid structure by Gyo Obata, forms one component of the St. Louis Science Center campus

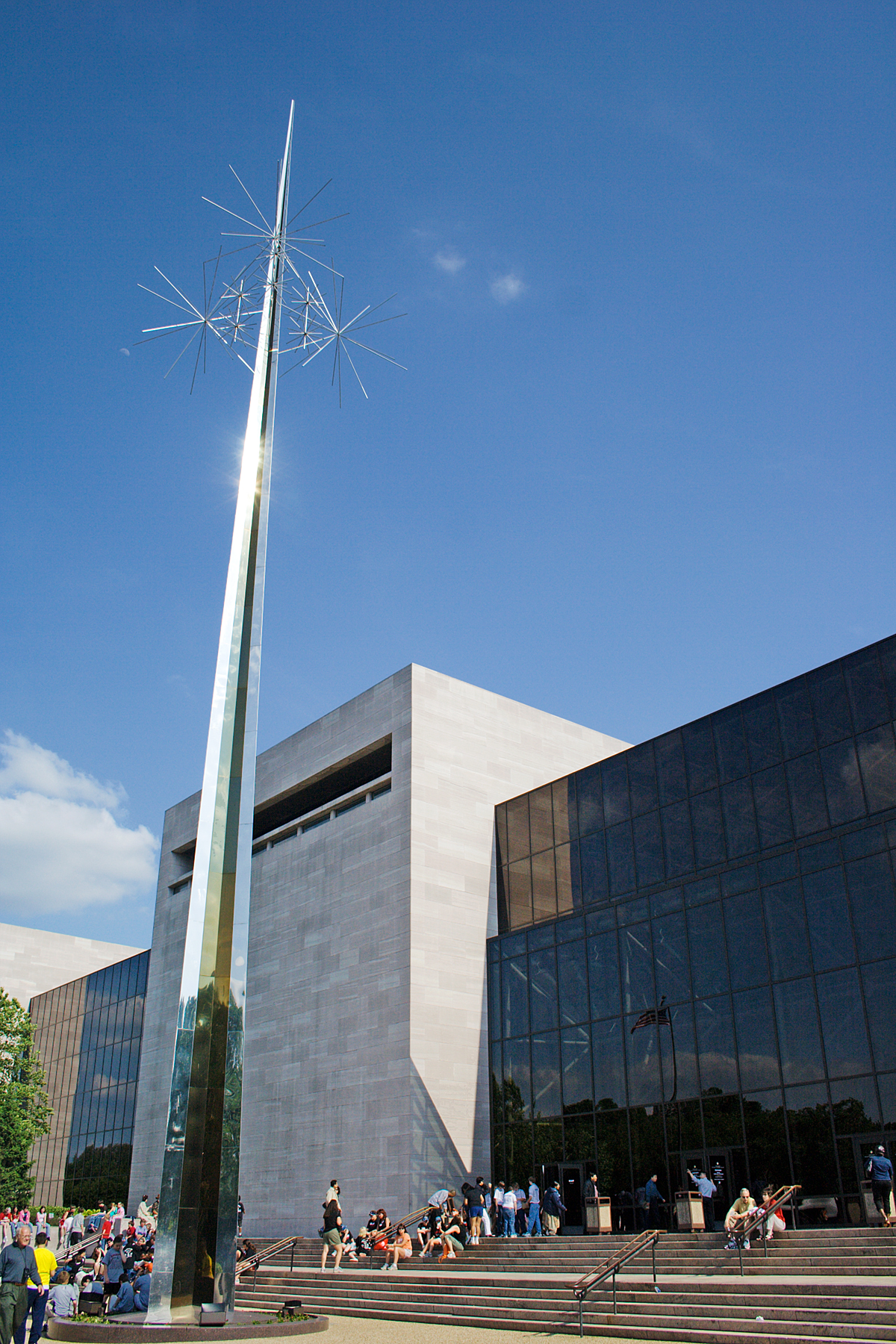
National Air and Space Museum in Washington, D.C.

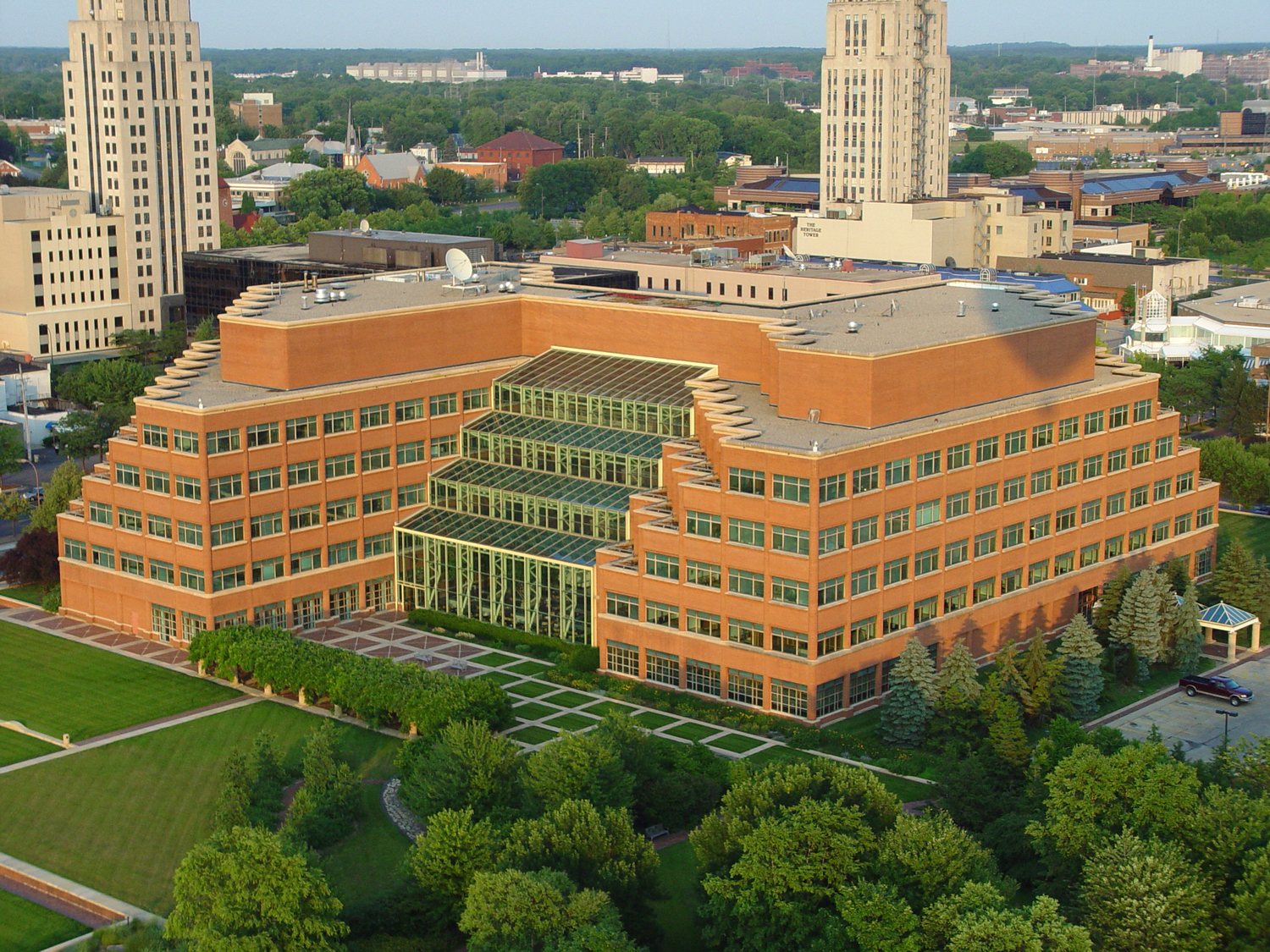
Kellogg Company Headquarters in Battle Creek, Michigan

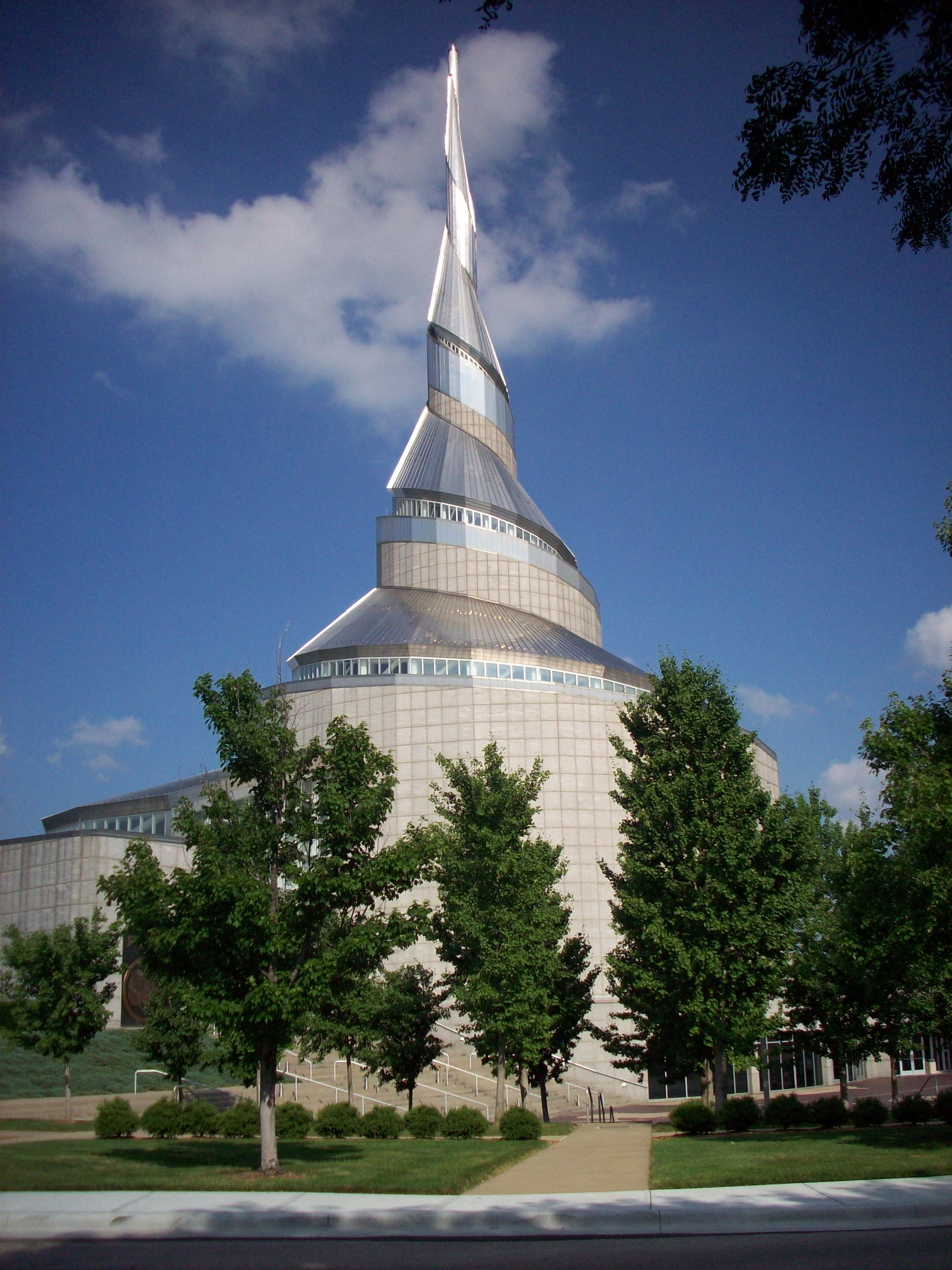
Independence Temple in Independence, Missouri

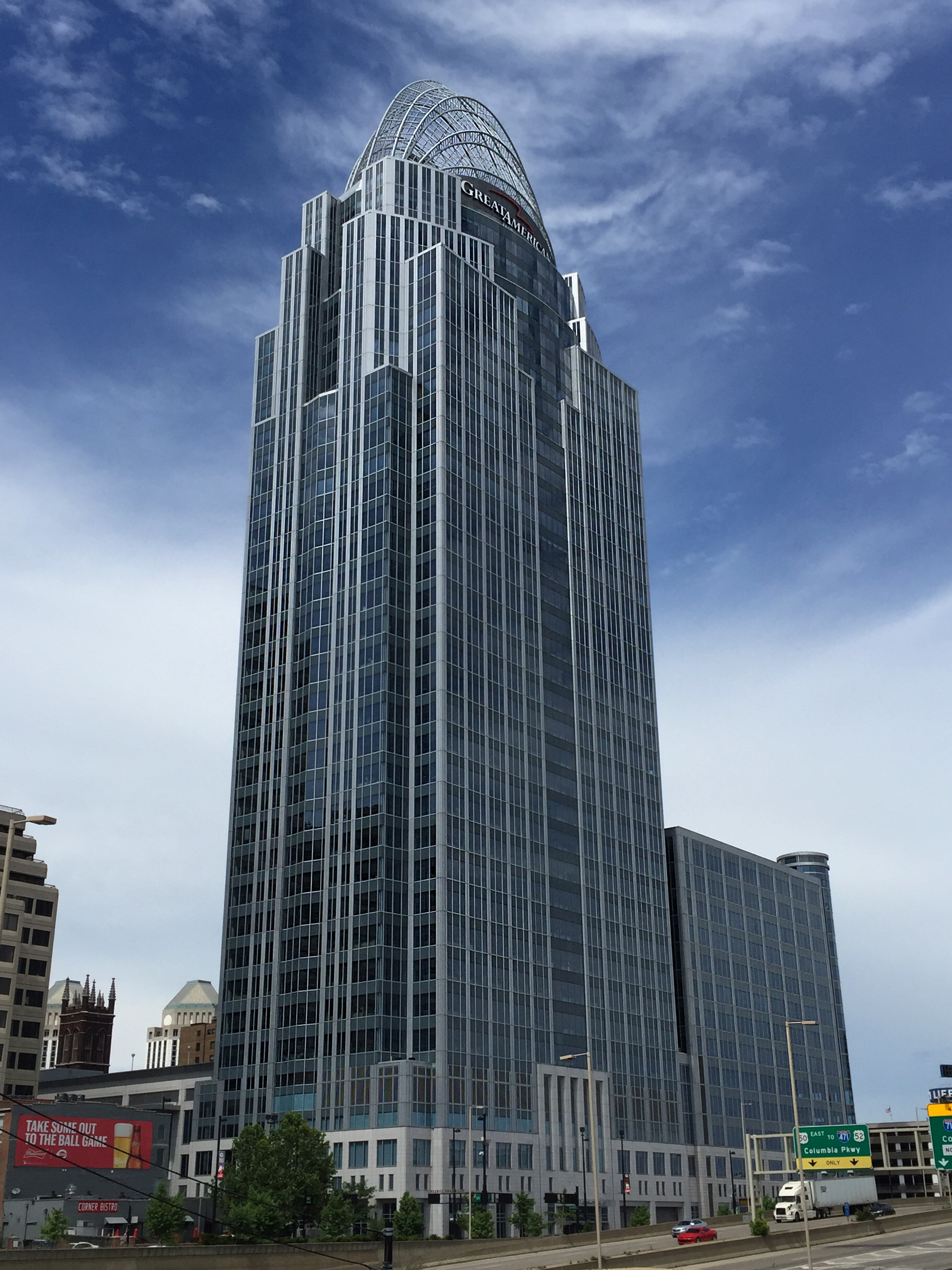
Great American Tower at Queen City Square in Cincinnati, Ohio

Obata's national and international projects include:

- Abraham Lincoln Presidential Library and Museum, Springfield, Illinois
- Alfred A. Arraj U.S. Courthouse, Denver, Colorado
- BP Building, Cleveland, Ohio
- Bristol-Myers Squibb Company Campus, Lawrenceville, New Jersey
- Dallas/Fort Worth International Airport in Texas
- Federal Reserve Bank of Minneapolis Headquarters and Operations Center, Minneapolis, Minnesota
- Florida Aquarium, Tampa, Florida
- Foley Square in New York City
- The Galleria, Houston, Texas
  - Neiman Marcus store at The Galleria
- Galleria Dallas, Dallas, Texas
- Great American Tower at Queen City Square, Cincinnati, Ohio
- Independence Temple, Independence, Missouri
- Japanese American National Museum, Los Angeles, California
- Kellogg Company Headquarters, Battle Creek, Michigan
- King Khaled International Airport, Riyadh, Saudi Arabia
- King Saud University, Riyadh, Saudi Arabia
- Levi's Plaza, San Francisco, California
- Moscone Center, San Francisco, California
- National Air and Space Museum, Washington, D.C.
- Palo Alto Research Center, Palo Alto, California
- Sendai International Airport Terminal Building in Sendai, Japan
- Taipei World Trade Center, Taipei City, Taiwan
- United States Penitentiary, Marion, Marion, Illinois
- University of Michigan Northwoods IV Housing, Ann Arbor, Michigan
- University of Wisconsin-Parkside Campus Master Plan, Kenosha, Wisconsin
- Wrigley Company Global Innovation Center, Chicago, Illinois

St. Louis projects include:

- Anthony's Restaurant and Bar
- Barnes-Jewish Hospital and Washington University School of Medicine Center for Advanced Medicine
- Boatmen's Tower
- Boeing Leadership Center
- Cervantes Convention Center and Stadium
- Congregation Bnai' Amoona Synagogue
- James S. McDonnell Planetarium at the St. Louis Science Center
- Lindell Terrace Apartments (now Lindell Terrace Condominium)
- Metropolitan Square, - Current location of HOK St. Louis office
- Missouri History Museum Emerson Center
- Obata Residence
- One Bell Center
- Priory Chapel (Saint Louis Abbey Church)
- Saint Louis Zoo Children's Zoo and The Living World
- Southern Illinois University Edwardsville Campus, Edwardsville, Illinois
- St. Louis Union Station Renovation and Redevelopment
- Thomas F. Eagleton United States Courthouse
- Washington University School of Medicine Farrell Learning and Teaching Center

Other projects include:

- Centene Plaza, Clayton, Missouri
- Forsythe Plaza, Clayton, Missouri
- University of Wisconsin-Parkside, Kenosha, Wisconsin
- Western Illinois University Malpass Library, Macomb, Illinois

== Awards and recognition ==
- Elected a Fellow in the American Institute of Architects (1969).
- Washington University in St. Louis Honorary Doctorate of Fine Arts (1990).
- Advisory Council for the Presidio in San Francisco (1991).
- University of Missouri-St. Louis Honorary Doctorate of Fine Arts (1991).
- Inducted into the St. Louis Walk of Fame (1992).
- First Howard A. Friedman Visiting professor of architecture at the University of California, Berkeley (1992).
- Southern Illinois University Edwardsville Honorary Doctorate (1999).
- American Institute of Architects St. Louis Gold Award Honor (2002).
- Lifetime Achievement Award in the Arts from the Japanese American National Museum (2004).
- Lifetime Achievement Award from the St. Louis Arts and Education Council (2008).
- Washington University in St. Louis Dean's Medal for the Sam Fox Awards for Distinction (2008).
