= One Metropolitan Square =

Office skyscraper located in downtown St. Louis, Missouri

Metropolitan Square
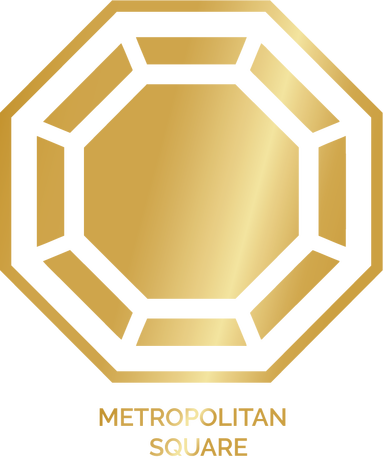

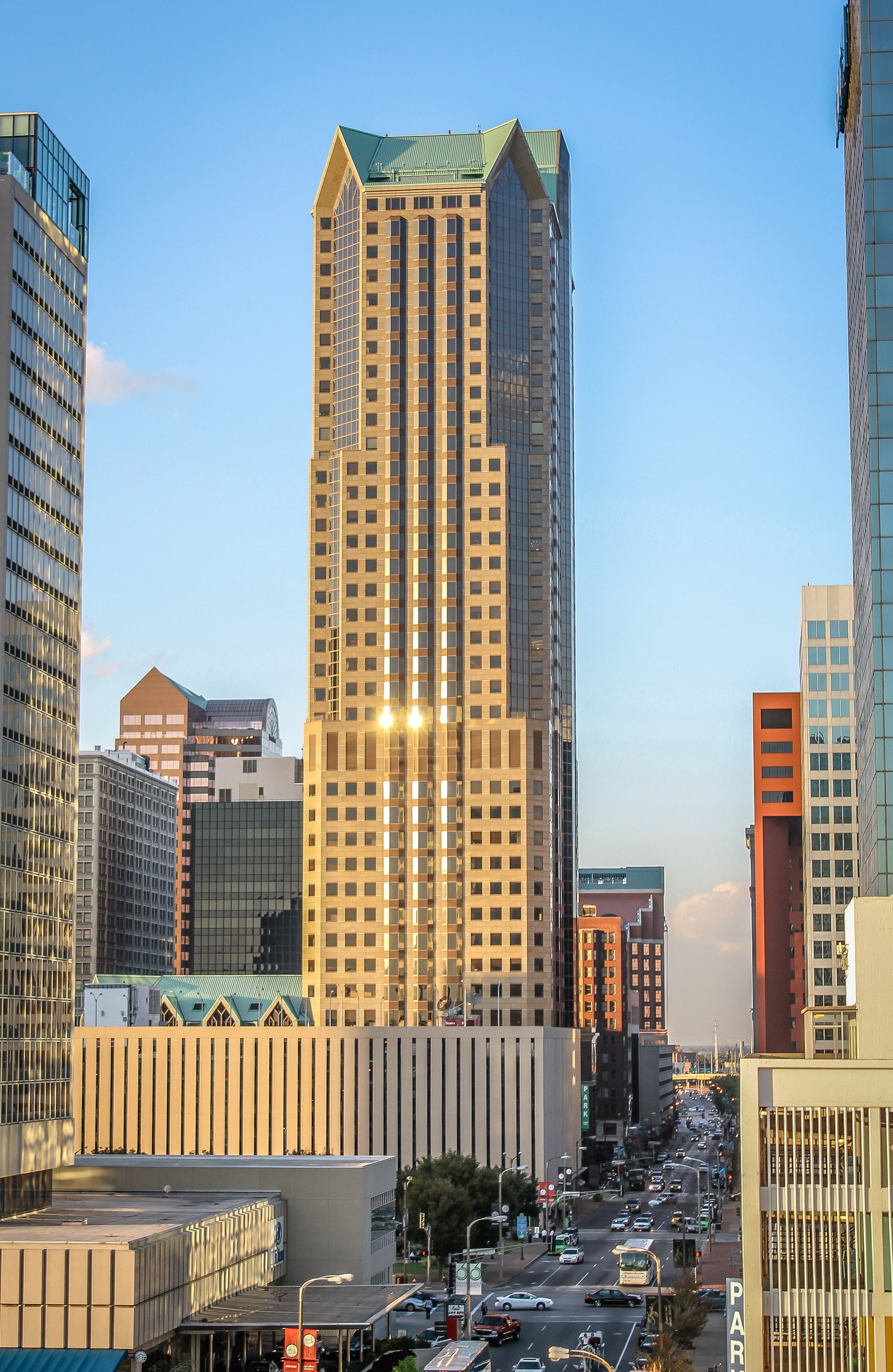
- One Metropolitian Square in 2012
- Interactive map of the Metropolitan Square area

General information
- Status: Completed
- Type: Commercial offices
- Location: 1 Metropolitan Square; St. Louis, Missouri
- Coordinates: 38.6275°N 90.1896°W
- Completed: 1989; 37 years ago
- Owner: 601 West Associates, LLC.
- Operator: Jones Lang LaSalle

Height
- Roof: 180.7 m (593 ft)

Technical details
- Floor count: 42
- Floor area: 88,559 m^{2} (953,240 sq ft)

Design and construction
- Architect: Hellmuth, Obata & Kassabaum
- Main contractor: McCarthy/Kwame Construction

Website
- onemetropolitansquare.com

One Metropolitan Square, also known as Met Square, is an office skyscraper completed in 1989, located in downtown St. Louis, Missouri. At 180.7 m (593 ft), it is the tallest building in the city and second tallest building in Missouri.

Major tenants include law firms Bryan Cave and Evans & Dixon, the Bi-State Development Agency and Greater St. Louis Inc.

The building was designed by the architectural firm Hellmuth, Obata and Kassabaum and was constructed by McCarthy Building Companies, Inc. In early May, 2014, a DJI Phantom quadcopter drone crashed into the building.

== See also ==
- List of tallest buildings in Missouri
- List of tallest buildings in St. Louis
