= HOK (firm) =

American design, architecture, engineering and planning firm

HOK Group, Inc.
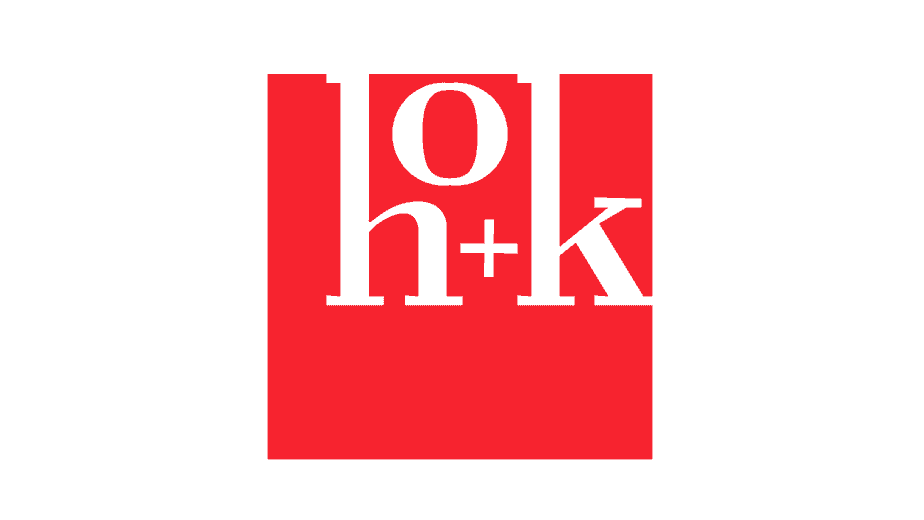
- Type: Private
- Industry: Architecture, engineering, urban planning
- Founded: 1955; 71 years ago
- Founders: George Hellmuth; Gyo Obata; George Kassabaum
- Headquarters: St. Louis, Missouri, United States
- Number of locations: ≤ 28
- Area served: International
- Key people: Eli Hoisington; Susan Klumpp Williams (co-CEOs); Carl Galioto (president)
- Services: Architecture, Consulting, Engineering, Experience Design, Interiors, Landscape Architecture, Lighting Design, On-Site Space Management, Planning + Urban Design, Sustainable Design
- Number of employees: 1,600
- Website: www.hok.com

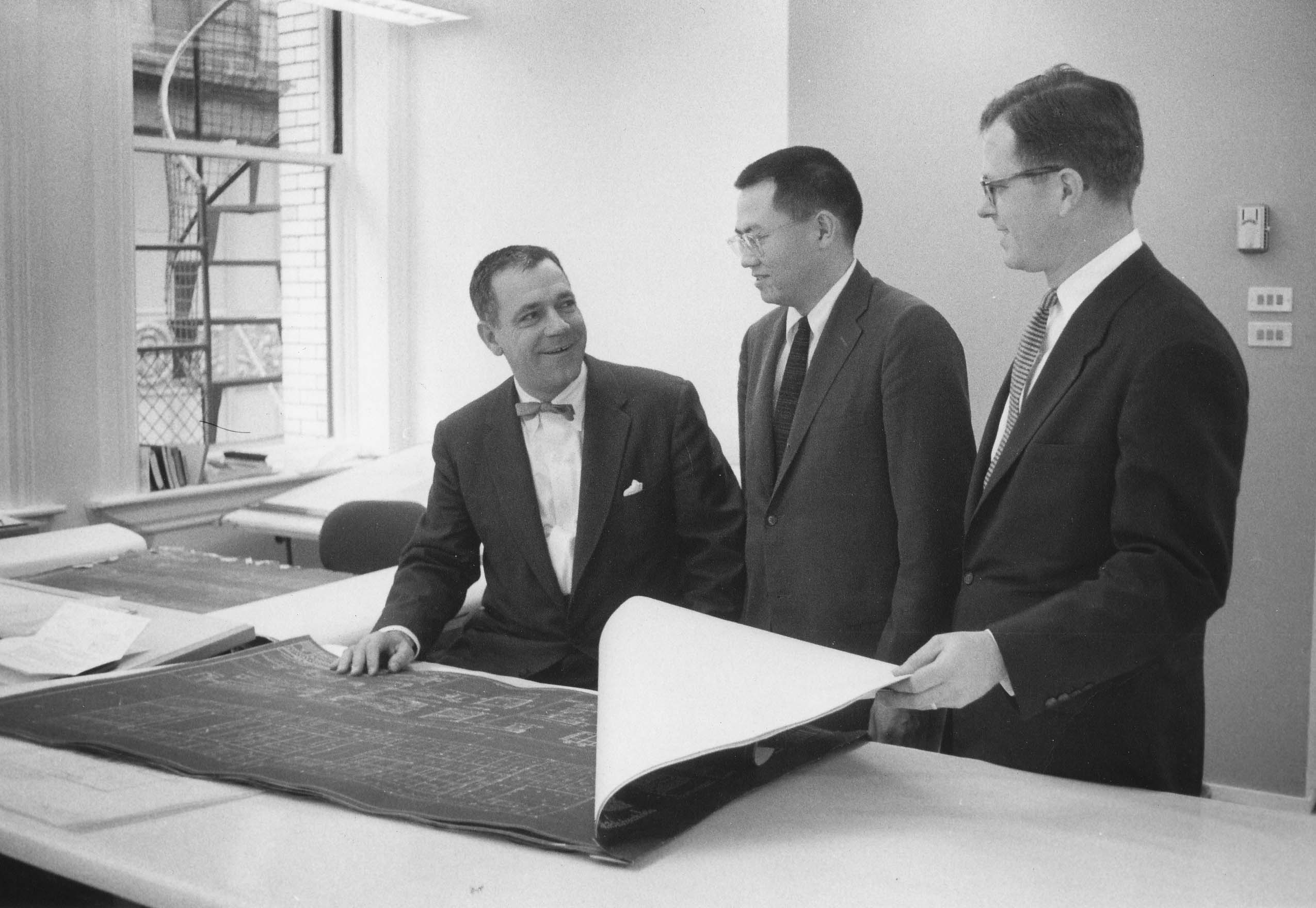
HOK founding partners George Hellmuth, Gyo Obata, and George Kassabaum (1956)

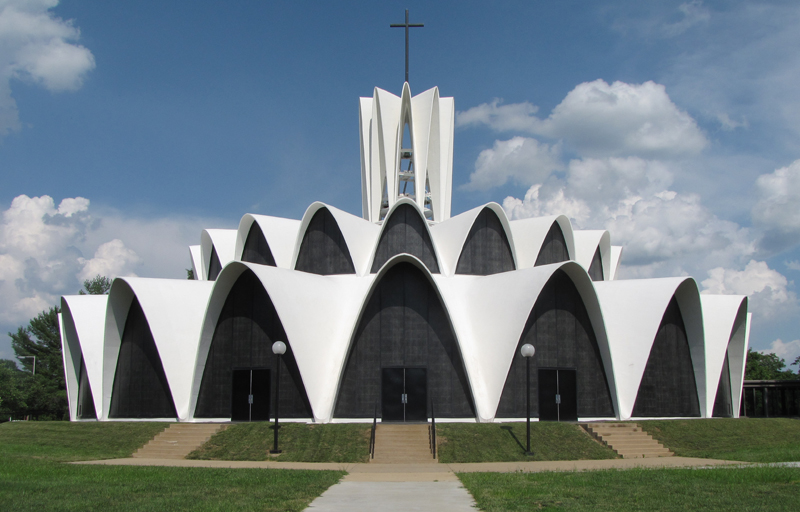
Priory Chapel at Saint Louis Abbey located in Creve Coeur a suburb of St. Louis

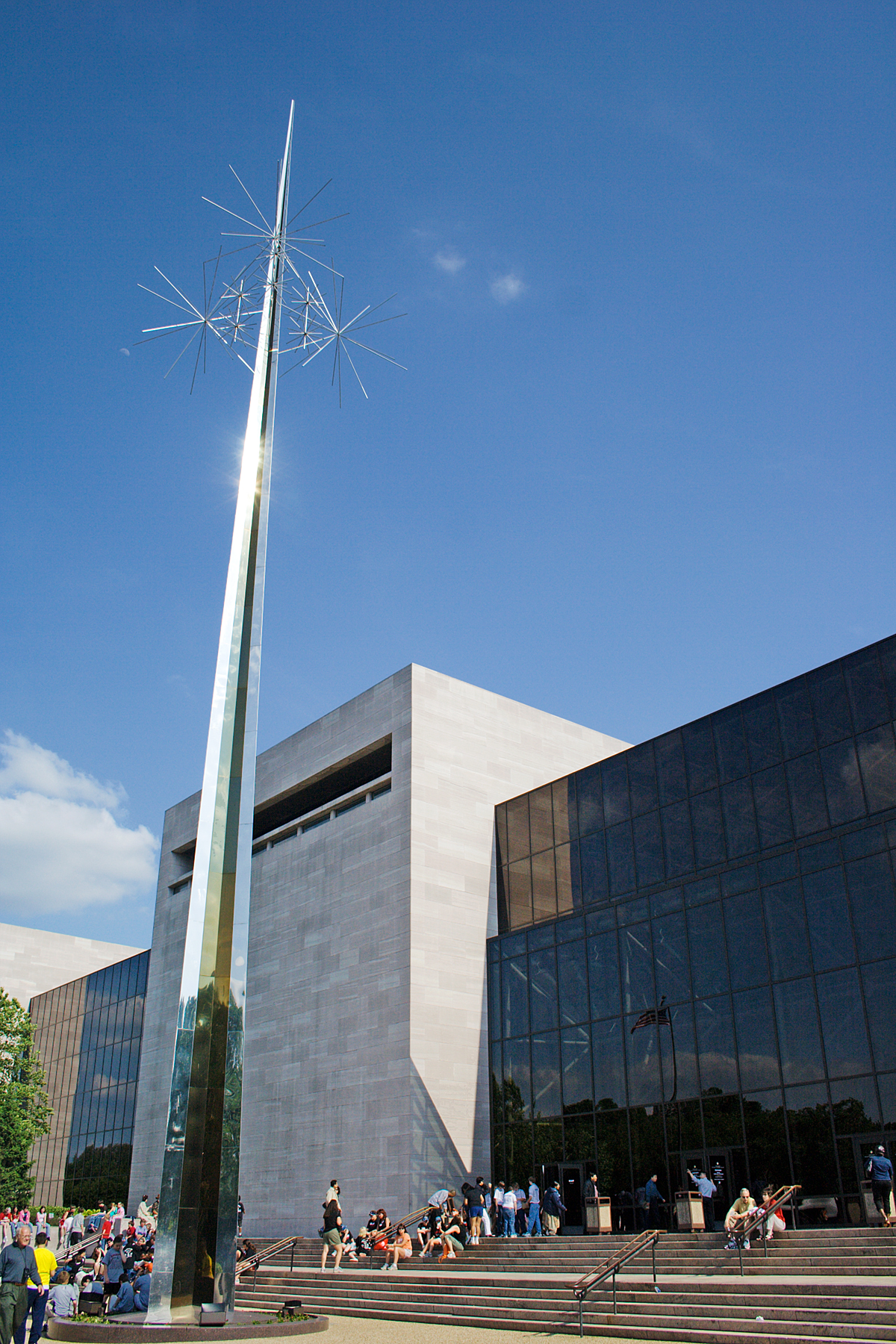
National Air and Space Museum in Washington, D.C.

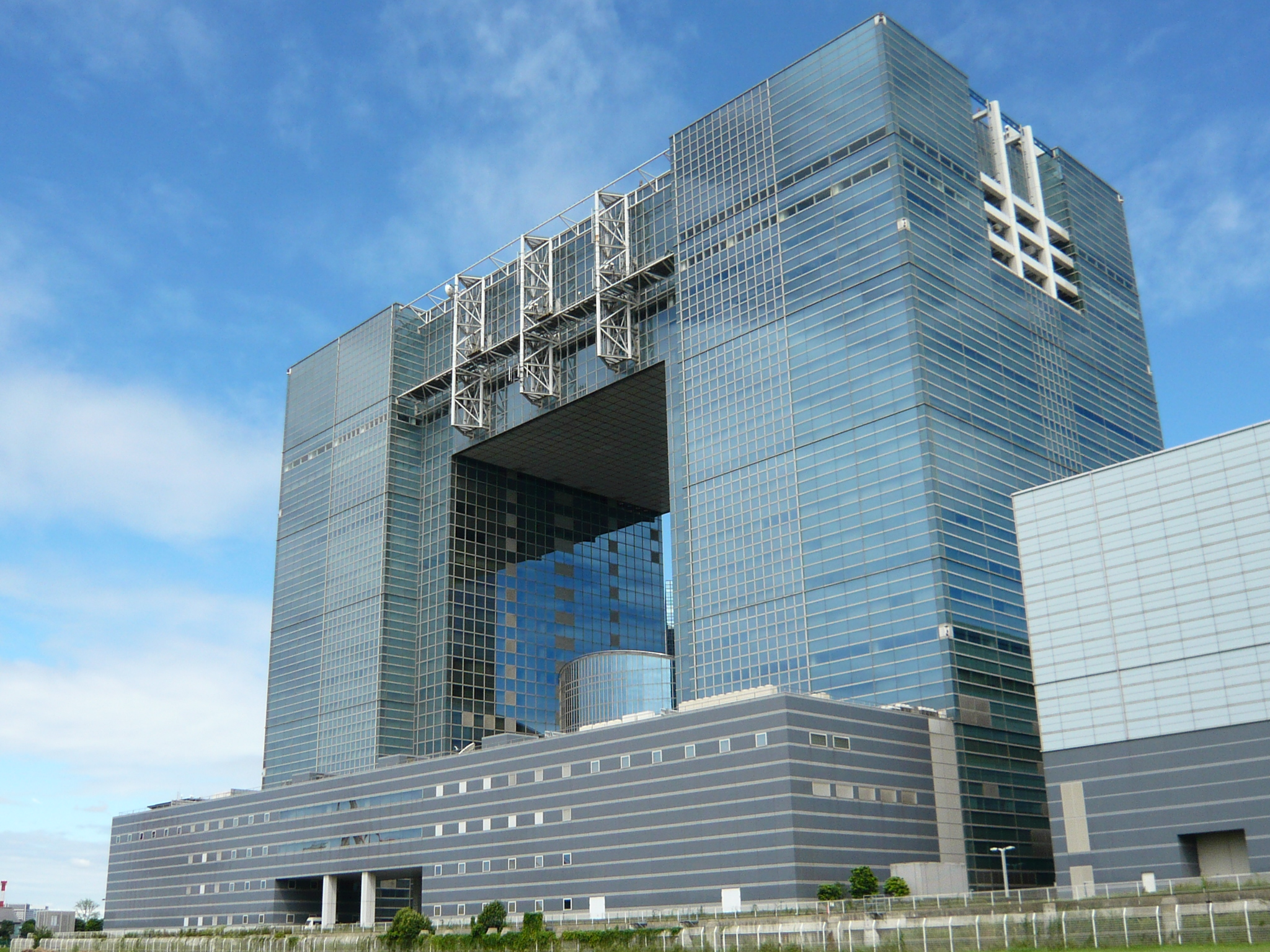
Tokyo Telecom Center in Tokyo

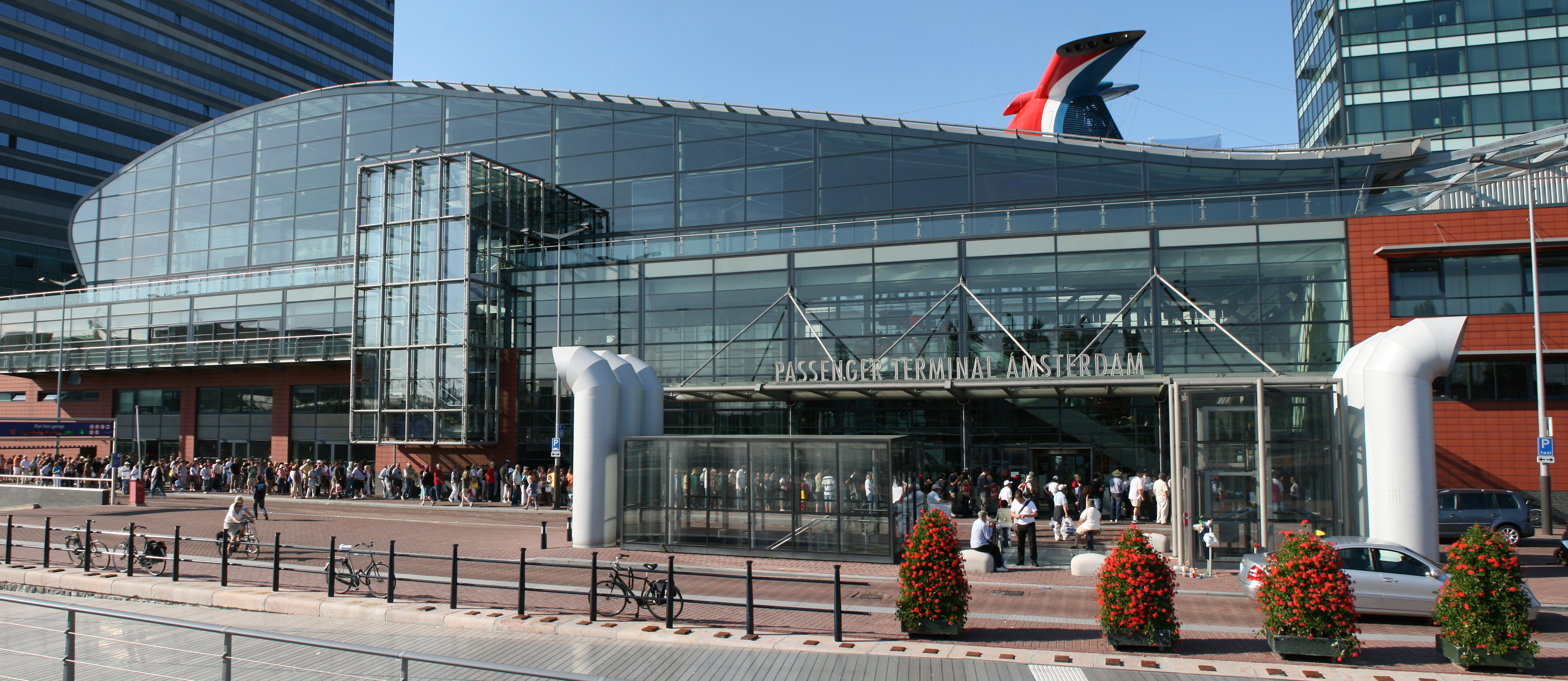
Passenger Terminal Amsterdam in Amsterdam

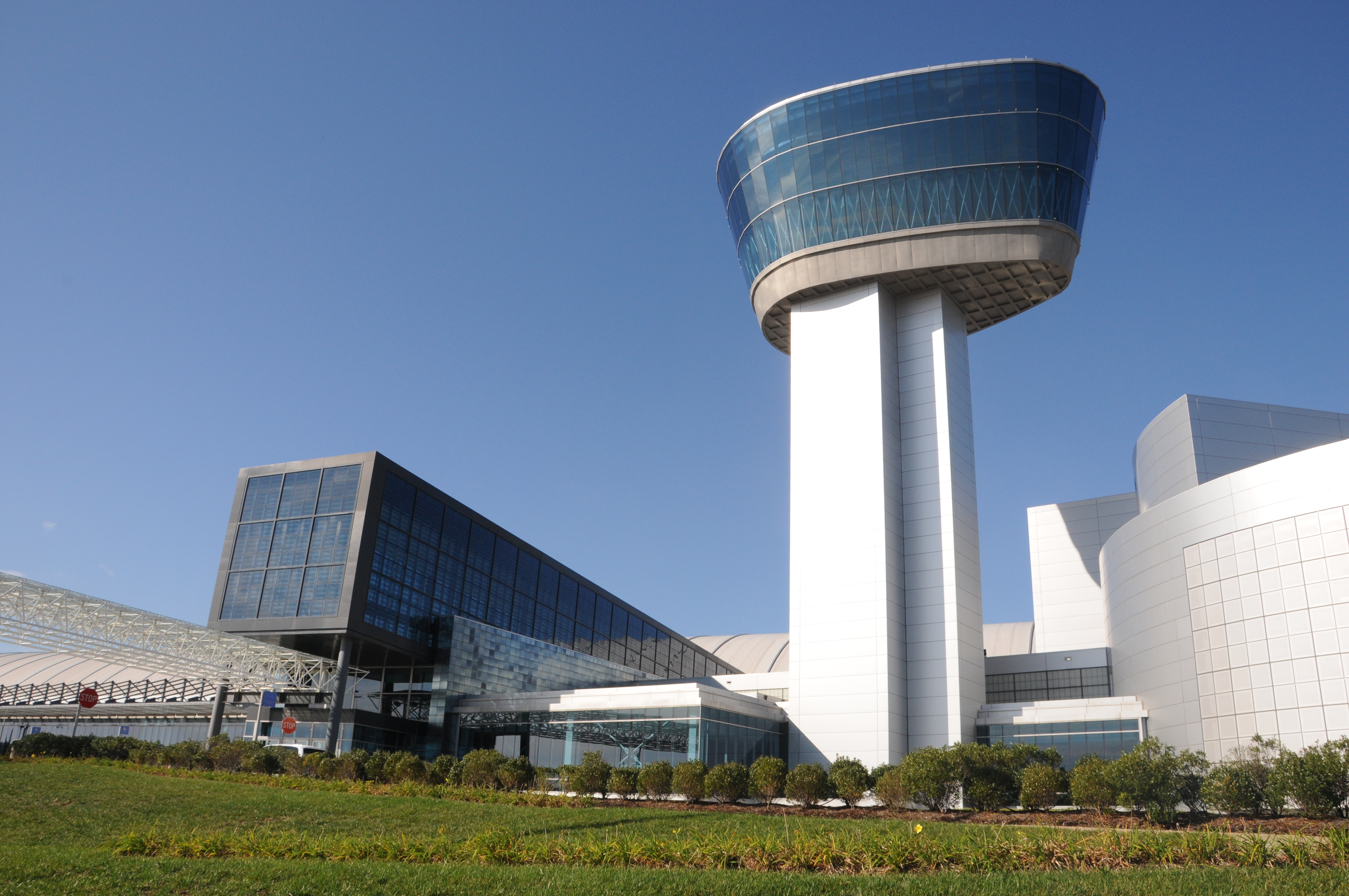
Steven F. Udvar-Hazy Center in Chantilly, Virginia

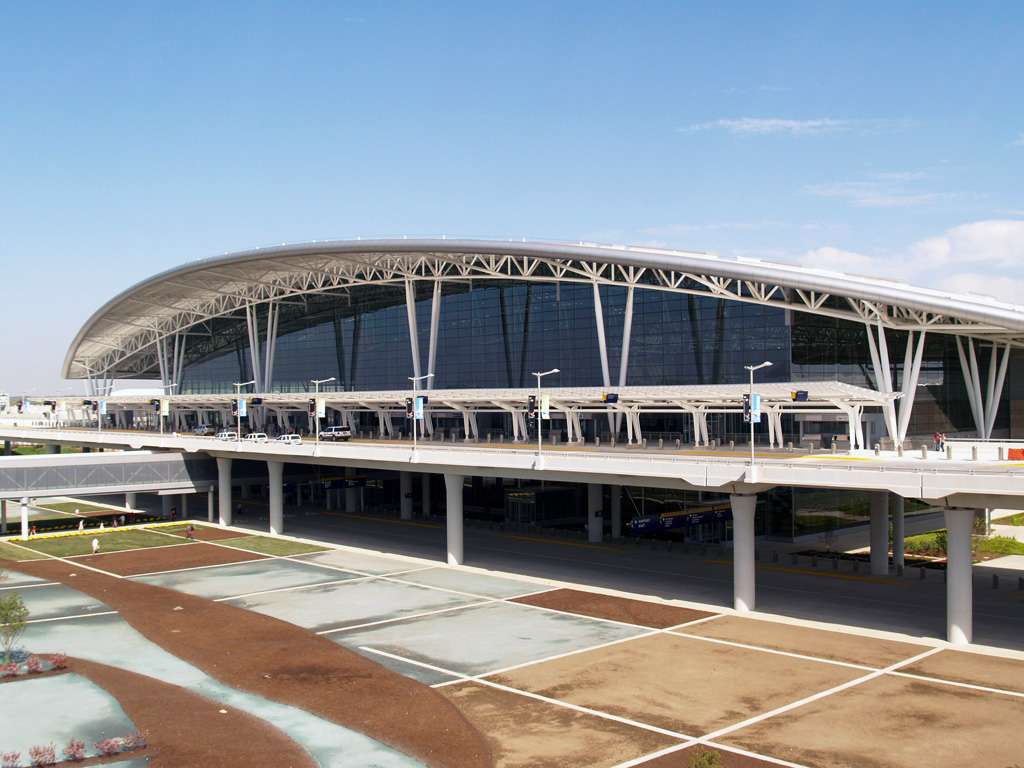
Indianapolis International Airport Colonel H. Weir Cook Terminal in Indianapolis, Indiana

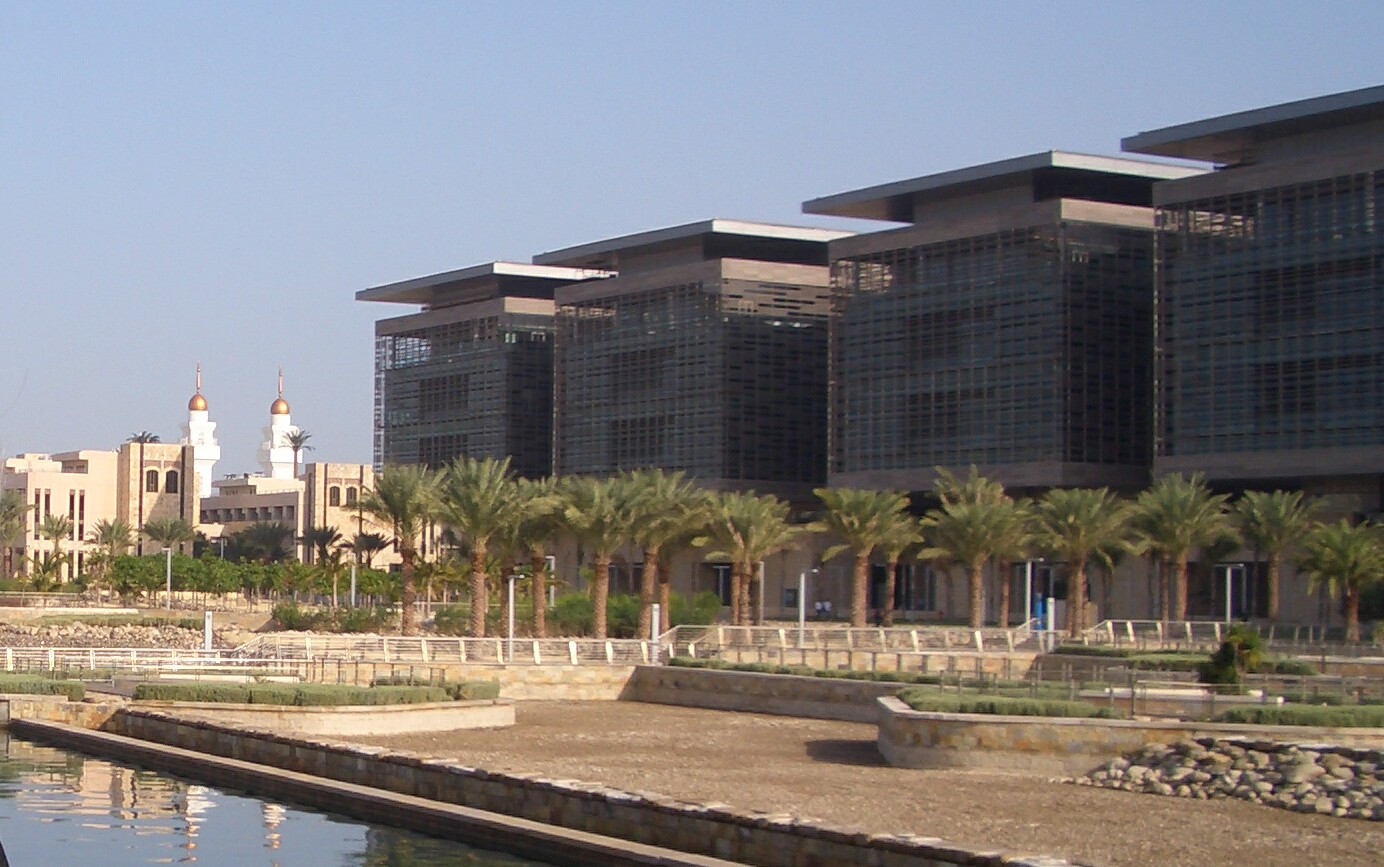
King Abdullah University of Science and Technology in Thuwal, Saudi Arabia

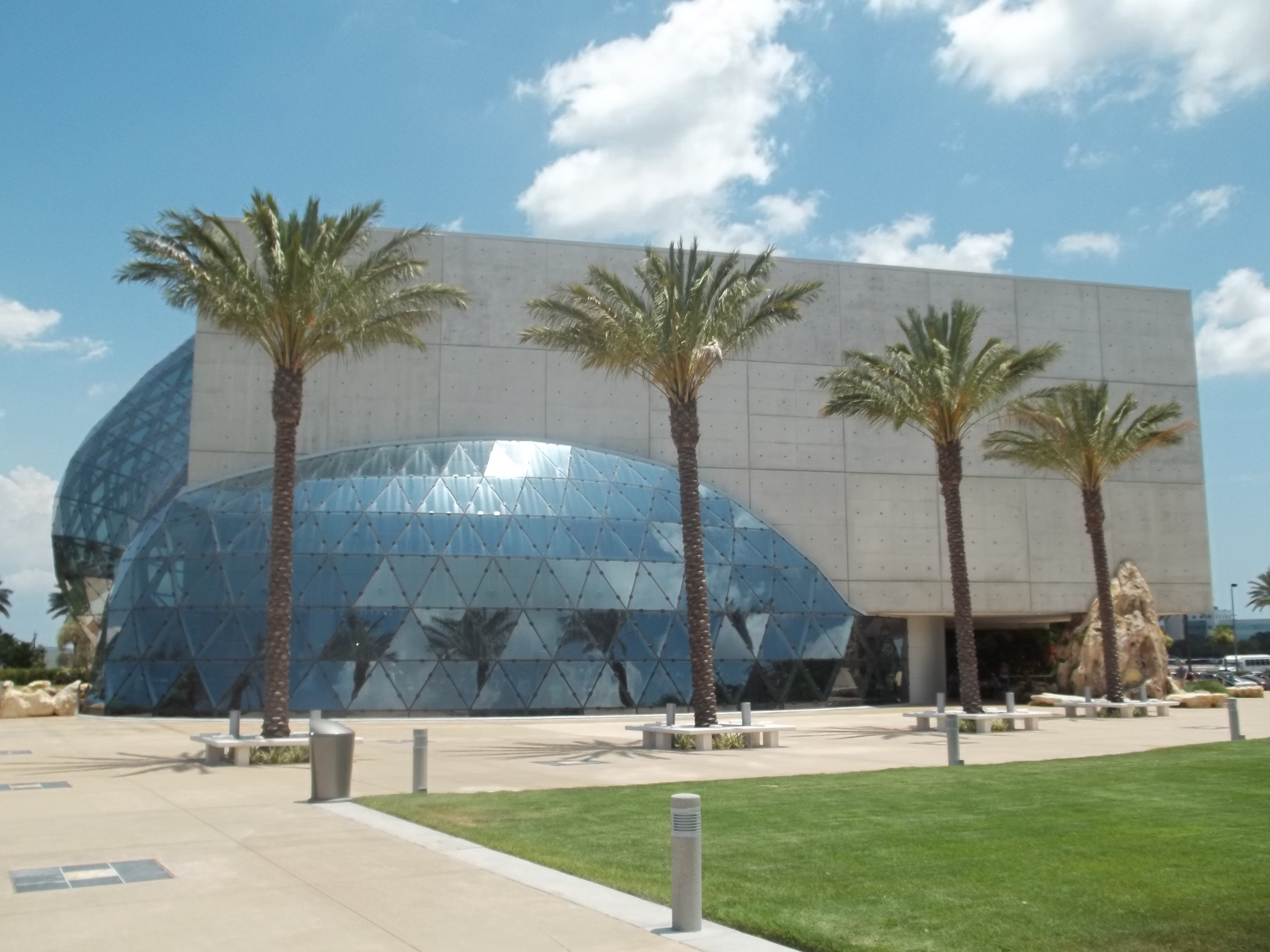
Salvador Dalí Museum in St. Petersburg, Florida

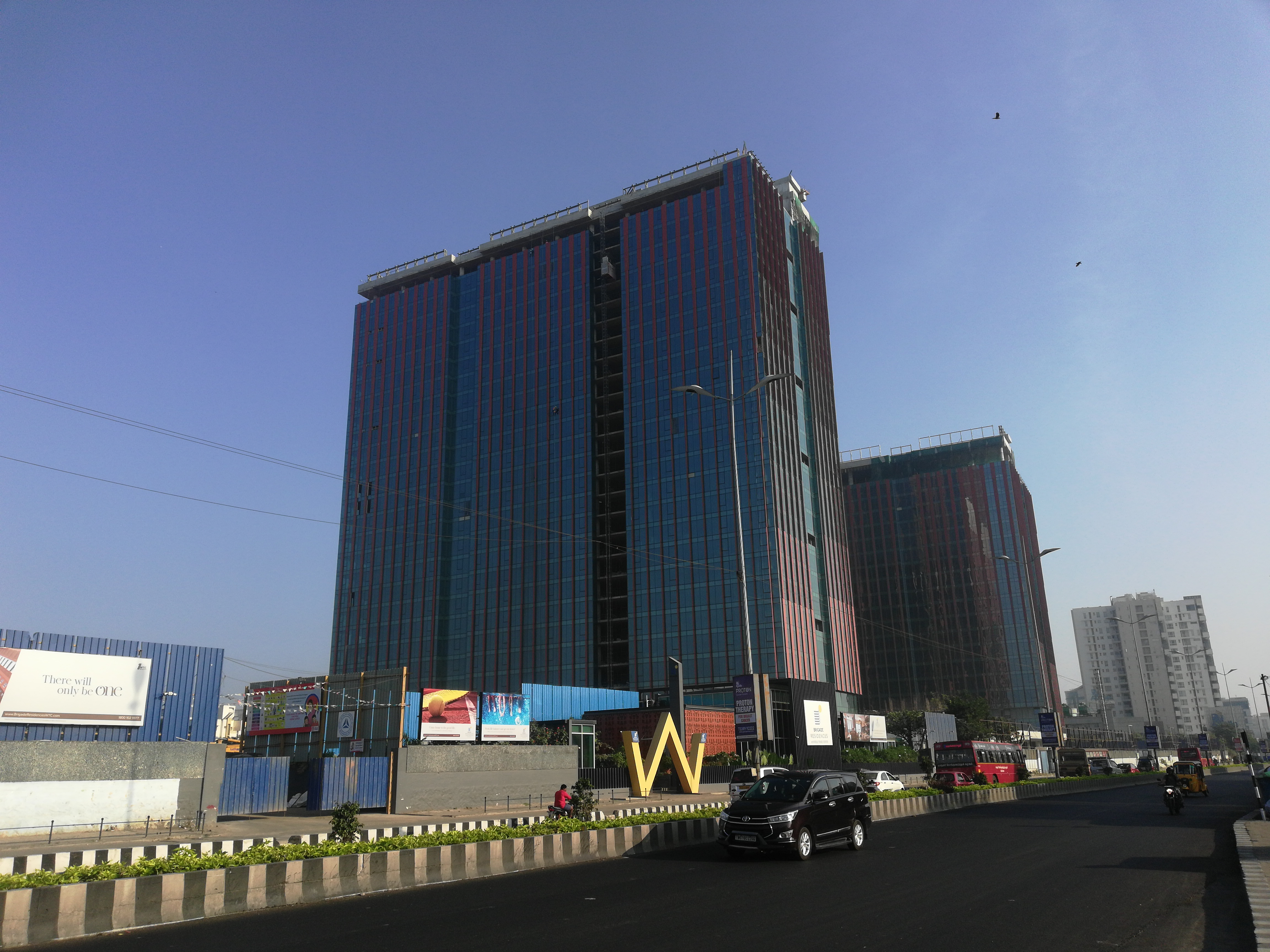
World Trade Center in Chennai, India

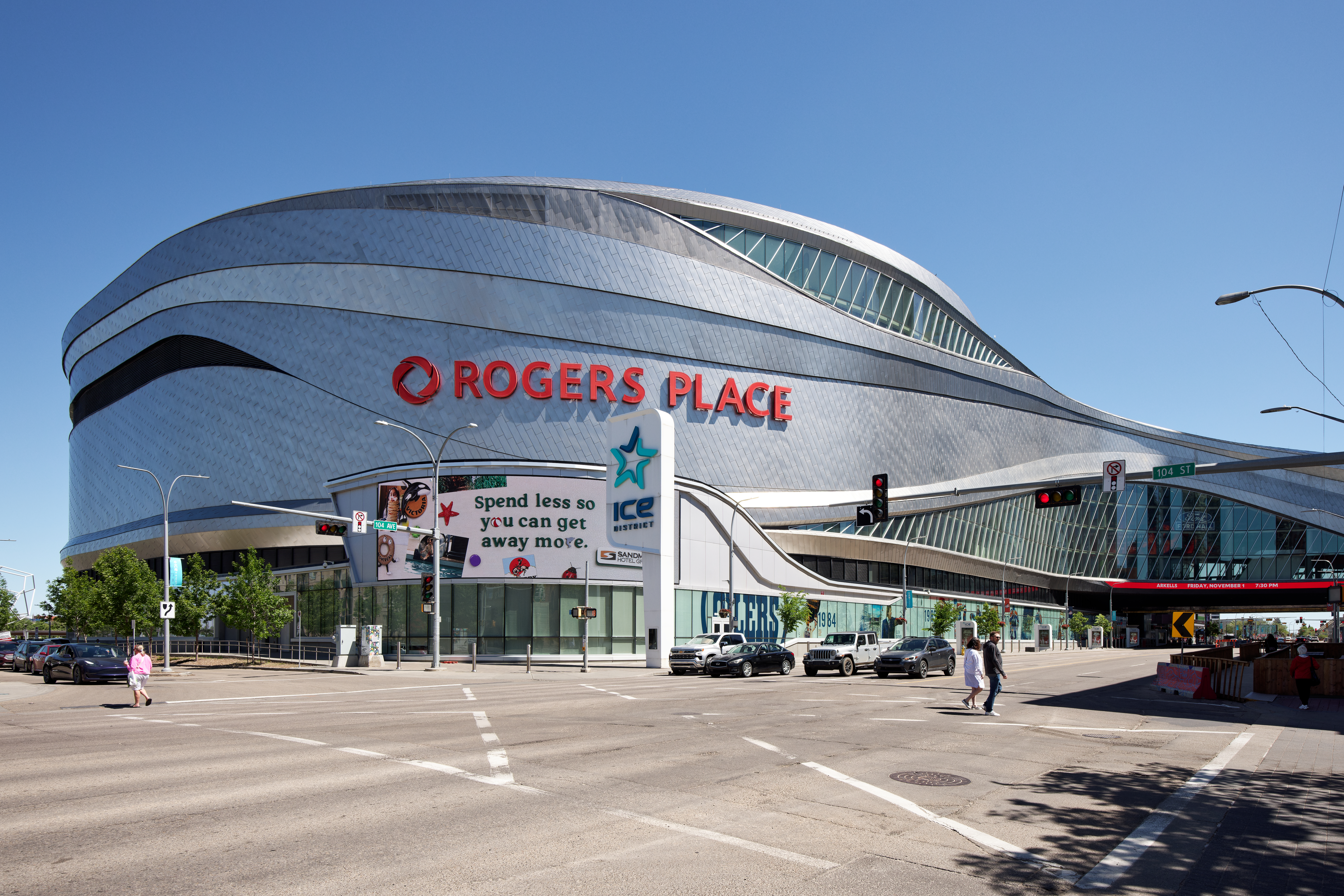
Rogers Place arena in Edmonton, Alberta, Canada

HOK Group, Inc., formerly Hellmuth, Obata + Kassabaum, is an American design, architecture, engineering, and urban planning firm. Founded in 1955, it is headquartered in St. Louis, Missouri.

== History ==
=== Founding ===
HOK was established in St. Louis, Missouri, in 1955. The firm is named for its three founding partners: George F. Hellmuth, Gyo Obata and George Kassabaum, all graduates of the School of Architecture at Washington University in St. Louis.

The practice's first building designs were schools in St. Louis suburbs, and St. Thomas Aquinas High School in Florissant was the first independent school designed by the firm. Another prominent school they designed was the Saint Louis Priory School.

=== Early years ===
By the mid-1960s, the firm began to open additional offices, starting with San Francisco in 1966 for the design of a library at Stanford University and Dallas in 1968 for the master planning and design of Dallas/Fort Worth International Airport. Also in 1968, HOK launched its interior design practice. That year, HOK expanded into Washington, D.C., after winning the commission to design the Smithsonian National Air and Space Museum. In 1973, HOK established a presence in New York by acquiring Kahn & Jacobs, designers of many New York City skyscrapers. By the 1970s, the firm was operating internationally and in 1975 the firm was named as architect of the $3.5 billion King Saud University in Riyadh, at the time the single largest building project in the world. In 1979, George Kassabaum was elected into the National Academy of Design as an Associate Academician.

In 1983, HOK formed HOK Sport Venue Event, a subsidiary devoted entirely to designing sport stadiums, arenas, and convention centers, an architectural boom market at the time. In January 2009, the Board of HOK Group, Inc. and managers of HOK Sports Facilities, LLC transferred ownership of HOK Sport to leaders of that practice. The company became an independent firm, and rebranded itself as Populous.

=== Expansion and acquisitions ===
HOK's first office outside the US opened in Hong Kong in 1984, and the second in London in 1987, a practice that would be expanded in 1995 by merging with the British architectural practice Cecil Denny Highton.

The firm expanded into China in 2013, when it acquired the New York and Shanghai offices of hospitality design firm BBG-BBGM, creating one of the world's largest interior design firms, although BBG-BBGM's office in Washington, D.C., continues to operate as BBGM. By 2007, international work represented more than 40% of HOK's annual revenue.

As of July 2026, HOK operates 28 offices across North America, Europe, and Asia, including in Hong Kong, Beijing and Shanghai in China; Dubai in the Middle East; Mumbai, India; and Toronto, Canada, where it established its first offices in 1997 with the acquisition of Urbana Architects.

Other domestic acquisitions include Caudill Rowlett Scott based in Houston, Texas, in November 1994, adding offices in Houston and Atlanta. The purchase of 360 Architecture in January 2015, a 200-person, Kansas City-based firm, gave the group additional capabilities in the design of stadiums, ballparks and arenas. That acquisition enabled HOK to launch a new global Sports, Recreation, and Entertainment design practice after the breakaway of Populous, and to open new offices in Kansas City and Columbus, Ohio (which has since closed). In May 2026, HOK acquired Rossetti Architects, a Detroit-based architecture firm.

On May 15, 2015, the firm announced a multi-year partnership with the United Soccer League (USL) in the US to lead a stadium development, design, and standards initiative to help house all USL clubs in soccer-specific stadiums across North America by the end of the decade.

=== Leadership ===
In 2023, Eli Hoisington and Susan Klumpp Williams were appointed joint co-CEOs of HOK, the firm's youngest CEOs, and the first time it had appointed a woman. They succeeded Bill Hellmuth, founder George Hellmuth's nephew, who was president of the firm from 2004 to 2016 and CEO from 2016 until his passing in 2023. Prior to Bill Hellmuth, Patrick MacLeamy served as HOK's CEO from 2003 to 2016, and chairman since 2012. MacLeamy succeeded HOK chairman Bill Valentine when he retired after 50 years with the firm.

== Design philosophy ==
In 1983, HOK introduced HOK Draw, computer-aided drafting software products that specialized in conceptual architectural design. In the early 2000s, HOK began using Building Information Modeling (BIM) to streamline the design and construction process.

His team designed the Weather Prediction Center with a four-story waterfall to direct rainwater into bio-retention gardens; and a louvred sunlight system for a building used by the Office of the Chief Medical Examiner.

HOK has worked with the Biomimicry Group, co-founded by Janine Benyus, since 2008, which directs designers to use natural models in solving problems such as precipitation capture. In 2010, they collaborated with the energy and daylight consultancy, The Weidt Group, to complete Net Zero Court, a zero-emissions class A commercial office building in St. Louis. Using an ocular roof design, their 2017 Mercedes-Benz Stadium became the first LEED Platinum certified sports stadium in the US. Their design for the Boston Consulting Group HQ in Toronto in 2022, uses principles of wellness-informed architecture, to maximize natural light and encouraging standing.

=== Publications ===
- Mendler, Sandra; Odell, William (2000). The HOK Guidebook to Sustainable Design. New York Weinheim: Wiley. ISBN 978-0-471-37906-5. OCLC 45059599.
- Sargent, Kay (March 4, 2025). Designing Neuroinclusive Workplaces. John Wiley & Sons. ISBN 9781394309351.

== Selected projects ==
- 1962: The Priory Chapel, St. Louis, Missouri, United States
- 1970: Houston Galleria, Houston, Texas, United States
- 1970: Xerox PARC, Palo Alto, California, United States
- 1975: King Saud University, Riyadh, Saudi Arabia
- 1976: National Air and Space Museum, Washington, D.C., United States
- 1977 Hulen Mall, Fort Worth, Texas, United States
- 1979: Cecil H. Green Library, Stanford University, Stanford, California, United States
- 1980: Dulles International Airport Main Terminal expansion, Dulles, Virginia, United States
- 1981: Moscone Center, San Francisco, California, United States
- 1981: Metropolitan Square, St. Louis, Missouri, United States
- 1982: Levi's Plaza, San Francisco, California, United States
- 1983: King Khaled International Airport, Riyadh, Saudi Arabia
- 1985: St. Louis Union Station Renovation and Redevelopment, St. Louis, Missouri, United States
- 1986: BP Building Cleveland, Ohio, United States
- 1986: Kellogg Company Headquarters Battle Creek, Michigan, United States
- 1986: Riverchase Galleria Birmingham, Alabama, United States
- 1991: 801 Grand, Des Moines, Iowa, United States (tallest building in Iowa)
- 1992: Schapiro Center for Engineering and Physical Science Research (CEPSR), Columbia University, New York City, United States
- 1993: Apple Inc. R&D Campus, Cupertino, California, United States
- 1994: Independence Temple, Independence, Missouri, United States
- 1995: Tokyo Telecom Center, Tokyo, Japan (co-designers)
- 1996: Tuntex Sky Tower, Kaohsiung, Taiwan
- 1996–1997: Nortel Brampton Centre HQ, Brampton, Ontario, Canada
- 1997: Foreign and Commonwealth Office Restoration, London, England
- 1997: George Bush Presidential Library, College Station, Texas, United States (on the campus of Texas A&M University)
- 1999: Northwestern Memorial Hospital Facility Replacement and Redevelopment, Chicago, Illinois, United States (co-designers)
- 1999: Edificio Malecon Office Tower, Buenos Aires, Argentina
- 1999: Boeing Leadership Center, St. Louis, Missouri, United States
- 1999: American Airlines Arena (home of NBA's Miami Heat), Miami, Florida, United States
- 2000: Passenger Terminal Amsterdam, Amsterdam, Netherlands
- 2000: Nationwide Arena (home of NHL's Columbus Blue Jackets), Columbus, Ohio, United States
- 2001: United States Environmental Protection Agency Research Center, Research Triangle Park, North Carolina, United States (1.2 million-sq.-ft. campus)
- 2002: Darwin Centre at the Natural History Museum, Passenger Terminal Cork, Cork Airport, Ireland
- 2002: Alfred A. Arraj U.S. Courthouse, Denver, Colorado, United States
- 2003: Steven F. Udvar-Hazy Center of the National Air and Space Museum, Chantilly, Virginia, United States
- 2004: Harlem Hospital Center Master Plan and Patient Pavilion, New York City, United States
- 2005: Cisco Systems Executive Briefing Center Interior Design, San Jose, California, United States
- 2005: Terminal A at Logan International Airport, Boston, Massachusetts, United States (world's first LEED certified air terminal building)
- 2005: Stockton Arena (home of ECHL Stockton Thunder), Stockton, California, United States
- 2006: Lavasa Hill Station Master Plan and Design Guidelines, Moss Valley, Pune, India
- 2006: Natural History Museum of the Adirondacks (The Wild Center), Tupper Lake, New York, United States
- 2006: SJ Berwin European Headquarters Interior Design, London, England, (Business Week/Architectural Record Award winner)
- 2007: Dubai Marina, Dubai, United Arab Emirates
- 2007: Hyatt on the Bund, Shanghai, China
- 2007: Sprint Center, Kansas City, Missouri, United States
- 2008: Frost Art Museum, Florida International University, Miami, Florida, United States
- 2008: Midfield Terminal at the Indianapolis International Airport, Indianapolis, Indiana, United States (master designer)
- 2008: Kansas City Power & Light District, Kansas City, Missouri, United States
- 2009: Doha City Centre, Doha, Qatar, (design of five hotel towers for largest retail development in the Middle East)
- 2009: King Abdullah University of Science and Technology (KAUST), Thuwal, Saudi Arabia (Saudi Arabia's first LEED certified project and the world's largest LEED Platinum project)
- 2009: Carnival House, head office of Carnival UK, Southampton, England
- 2009: Bakrie Tower, Jakarta, Indonesia
- 2009: Huntington Park (home of Triple-A MiLB Columbus Clippers), Columbus, Ohio, United States
- 2010: Indira Gandhi International Airport – Terminal 3, Delhi, India (LEED Gold certification)
- 2010: New Building 20 at NASA's Lyndon B. Johnson Space Center, Houston, Texas, (LEED Platinum certification)
- 2010: MetLife Stadium (home of NFL's New York Giants and New York Jets), East Rutherford, New Jersey, United States
- 2011: Salvador Dalí Museum, St. Petersburg, Florida
- 2011: Brigade Gateway Enclave, Bengaluru, India
- 2011: Keangnam Hanoi Landmark Tower, Hanoi, Vietnam (tallest building in Vietnam)
- 2012: Canon USA Headquarters, Melville, New York
- 2012: Baku Flame Towers, Baku, Azerbaijan
- 2012: Harlem Hospital Center Mural Pavilion, New York City
- 2013: San Francisco Mint Adaptive Reuse, San Francisco, California
- 2013: BBC Broadcasting House Headquarters Workplace Strategy and Interior Design, London, England
- 2013: Husky Stadium (home of University of Washington football), Seattle, Washington, United States
- 2013: Auburn University Recreation & Wellness Center, Auburn, Alabama, United States
- 2014: 535 Mission Street, San Francisco, California, United States
- 2014: Anaheim Regional Transportation Intermodal Center, Anaheim, California, United States
- 2014: National Oceanic and Atmospheric Administration Inouye Regional Center, Pearl Harbor, Hawaii, United States
- 2014: Hamad International Airport Passenger Terminal Complex, Doha, Qatar
- 2015: PayPal Park (home of MLS's San Jose Earthquakes), San Jose, California, United States
- 2015: Porsche U.S. Headquarters and Customer Experience Center, Atlanta, Georgia
- 2015: University of Chicago William Eckhardt Research Center, Chicago, Illinois
- 2016: Abu Dhabi National Oil Company Headquarters, Abu Dhabi, United Arab Emirates
- 2016: Rogers Place (home of NHL Edmonton Oilers), Edmonton, Alberta, Canada
- 2016: Perot Tower, Mixed Use, Dallas, Texas
- 2016: St Bartholomew's Hospital Redevelopment and King George V Building, London, England
- 2017: University at Buffalo School of Medicine and Biomedical Sciences, Buffalo, New York
- 2017: Capital Market Authority Tower, Riyadh, Saudi Arabia
- 2017: Mercedes-Benz Stadium (home of the NFL's Atlanta Falcons and MLS's Atlanta United FC) Atlanta, Georgia, United States
- 2017: Little Caesars Arena (home of NHL's Detroit Red Wings and NBA's Detroit Pistons), Detroit, Michigan, United States
- 2018: Hartsfield–Jackson Atlanta International Airport Passenger Terminal Modernization, Atlanta
- 2018: Central and Wolfe Campus, Sunnyvale, California, United States
- 2018: Kentucky International Convention Center Redevelopment, Louisville, Kentucky, United States
- 2018: LG Science Park, Seoul, South Korea
- 2019: FC Barcelona New Palau Blaugrana Arena, Barcelona, Spain
- 2019: Las Vegas Ballpark (home of Pacific Coast League Las Vegas Aviators), Summerlin, Nevada, United States
- 2020: World Trade Center Towers, Chennai, India
- 2020: Lynn Family Stadium (home of the USL Championship's Louisville City FC and the NWSL's Racing Louisville FC), Louisville, Kentucky, United States
- 2020: Spire London Skyscraper, London, England
- 2020: LaGuardia Airport Central Terminal B, Queens, New York (Phase 1)
- 2021: UPMC Vision and Rehabilitation Hospital at UPMC Mercy, Pittsburgh, Pennsylvania, United States
- 2021: Stanford University School of Medicine Center at Stanford University, California.
- 2022: AdventHealth Training Center, Orlando, Florida, United States
- 2022: Energizer Park, St. Louis, Missouri
- 2022: Boston Consulting Group Canadian Headquarters, Toronto, Ontario, Canada
- 2023: Emory University Health Sciences Research Building II, Atlanta, Georgia, United States
- 2024: Roig Arena, Valencia, Spain
- 2025: KPMG New York Headquarters
- 2025: Bon Secours Hospital Limerick
- 2025: Osvaldo N. Soto Miami-Dade Justice Center
- 2027 (projected): Etihad Park, Queens, New York, United States
