= St. Louis =

Independent city in Missouri, United States

- Independent city
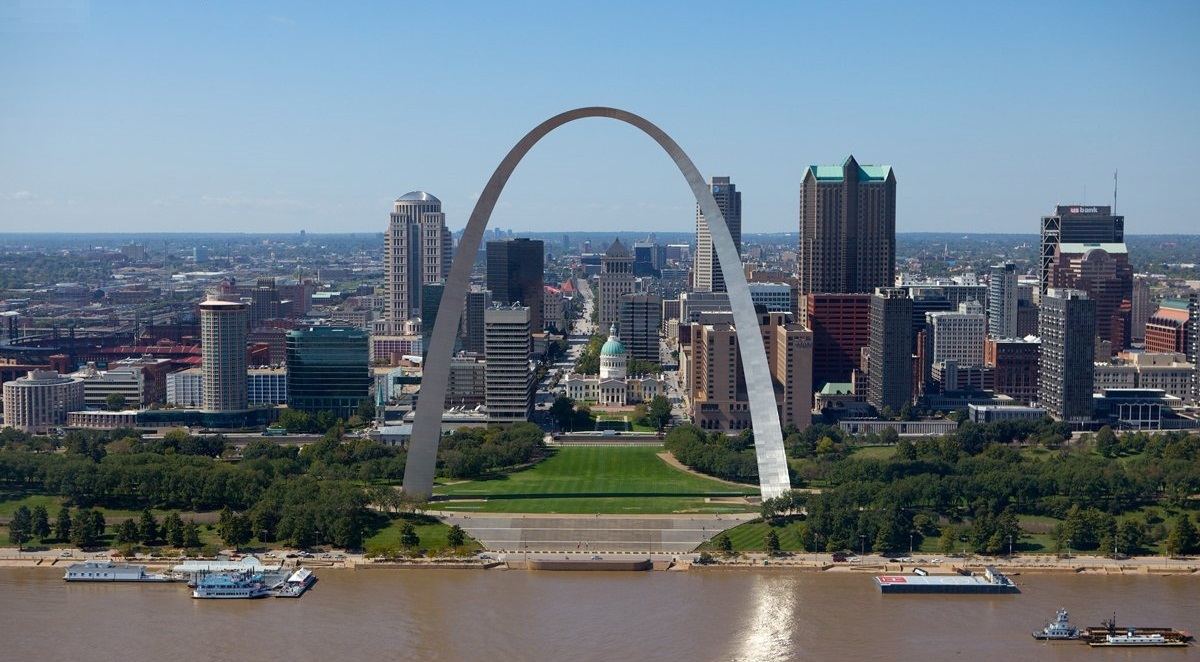
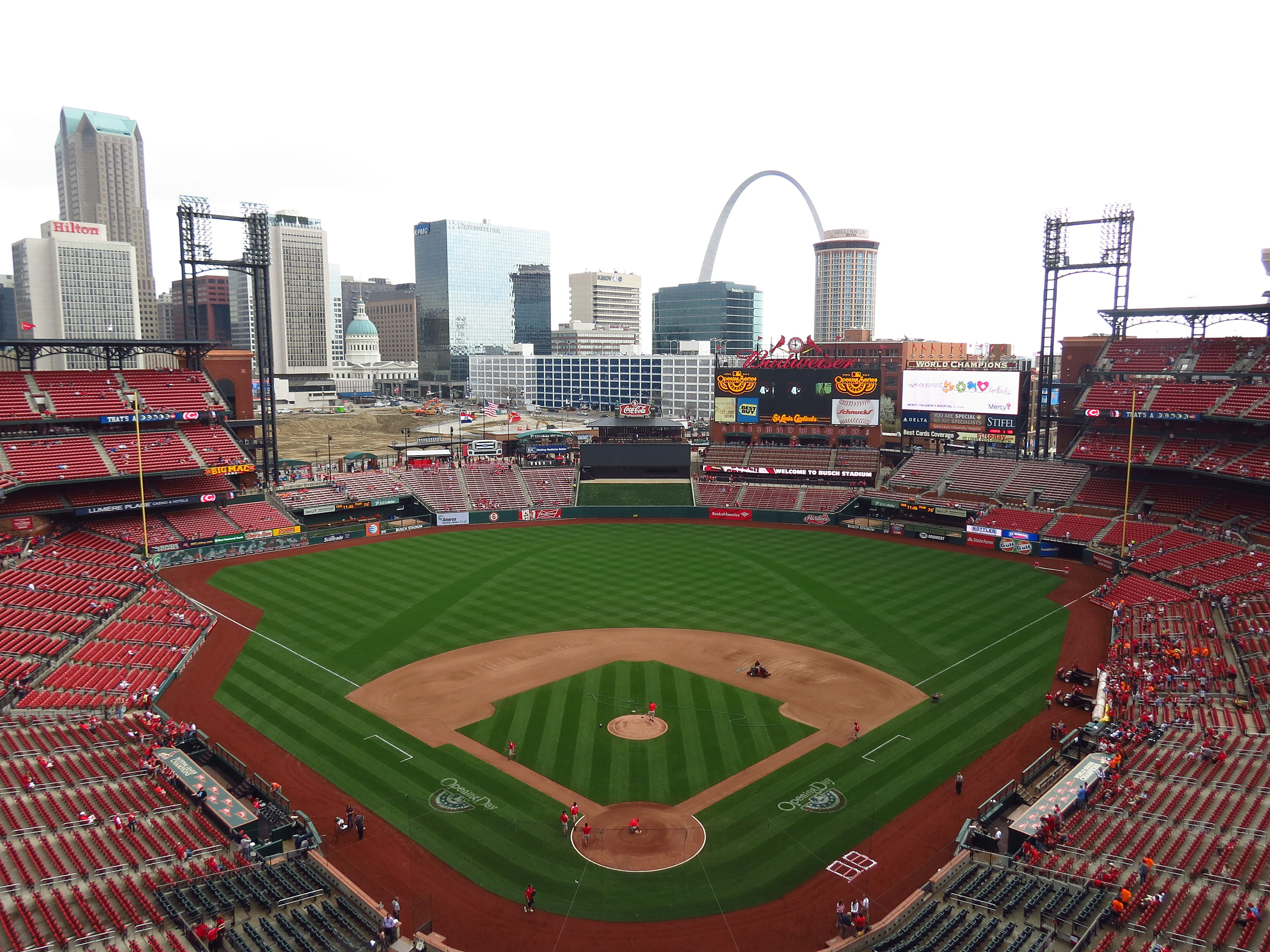
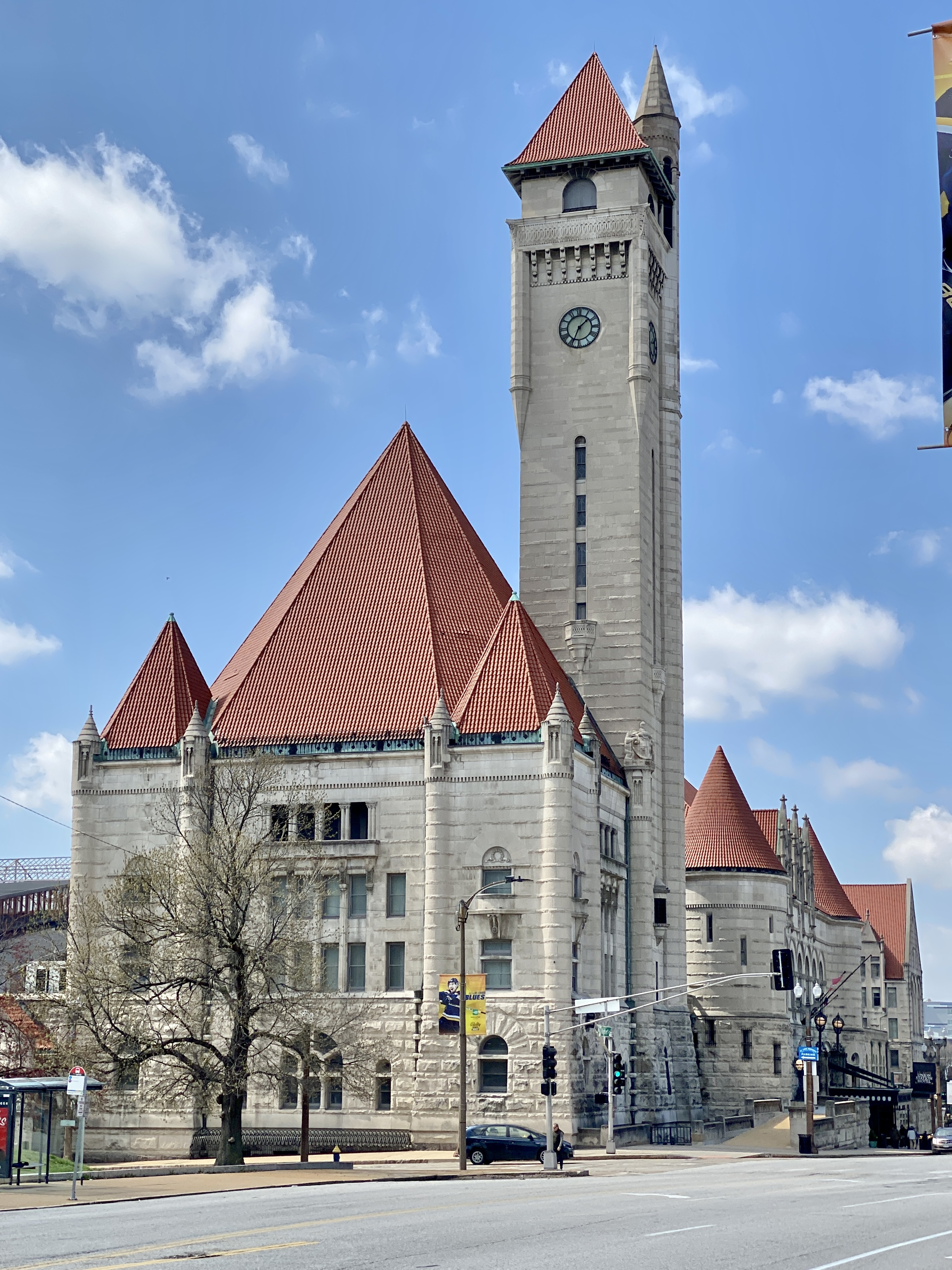
- Downtown St. Louis featuring the Gateway Arch and Mississippi River Cathedral Basilica of Saint Louis Busch Stadium St. Louis Union Station Missouri Botanical Garden Fox Theatre St. Louis Art Museum at Forest Park

- Flag Seal
- Nicknames: "Gateway to the West", The Gateway City, Mound City, The Lou, Rome of the West, River City, The STL, St. Lou
- Interactive map of St. Louis
- Location within Missouri Location within the United States
- Coordinates: 38°37′38″N 90°11′52″W
- Country: United States
- State: Missouri
- CSA: St. Louis–St. Charles–Farmington, MO–IL
- Metro: St. Louis, MO-IL
- Founded: February 14, 1764
- Incorporated: 1822
- Named for: Louis IX of France

Government
  - Type: Mayor–council
  - Body: Board of Aldermen
  - Mayor: Cara Spencer (D)
  - President, Board of Aldermen: Megan Green (D)

Area
  - Independent city: 66.17 sq mi (171.39 km^{2})
  - Land: 61.72 sq mi (159.85 km^{2})
  - Water: 4.45 sq mi (11.53 km^{2})
  - Urban: 910.4 sq mi (2,357.8 km^{2})
  - Metro: 8,458 sq mi (21,910 km^{2})
- Elevation: 466 ft (142 m)
- Highest elevation: 614 ft (187 m)

Population (2020)
  - Independent city: 301,578
  - Estimate (2025): 278,144 ▼
  - Rank: US: 82nd Midwest: 13th Missouri: 2nd
  - Density: 4,886.2/sq mi (1,886.59/km^{2})
  - Urban: 2,156,323 (US: 22nd)
  - Urban density: 2,369/sq mi (914.5/km^{2})
  - Metro: 2,809,299 (US: 23rd)
  - CSA: 2,914,230 (US: 20th)
- Demonym(s): St. Louisan; Saint Louisan

GDP
  - Greater St. Louis: $209.9 billion (2022)
- Time zone: UTC−6 (CST)
  - Summer (DST): UTC−5 (CDT)
- ZIP Codes: List: 63101–63141 63143–63147 63150–63151 63155–63158 63160 63163–63164 63166–63167 63169 63171 63177–63180 63182 63188 63190 63195 63197–63199
- Area code: 314/557
- FIPS code: 29-65000
- Website: stlouis-mo.gov

St. Louis (Note: /seɪnt ˈluːɪs, sənt-/ saynt LOO-iss, sənt-) (officially the City of St. Louis) is an independent city in the U.S. state of Missouri. It lies near the confluence of the Mississippi and the Missouri rivers. In 2020, the city proper had a population of 301,578, while its metropolitan area, which extends into Illinois, had an estimated population of over 2.8 million. It is the largest metropolitan area in Missouri and the second-largest in Illinois. The city's metropolitan statistical area is the 23rd-largest in the United States.

The land that became St. Louis had been occupied by Native American cultures for thousands of years before European settlement. The city was founded on February 14, 1764, by French fur traders Gilbert Antoine de St. Maxent, Pierre Laclède, and Auguste Chouteau. They named it for King Louis IX of France, and it quickly became the regional center of the French Illinois Country. In 1804, the United States acquired St. Louis as part of the Louisiana Purchase. In the 19th century, St. Louis developed as a major port on the Mississippi River; from 1870 until the 1920 census, it was the fourth-largest city in the country. It separated from St. Louis County in 1877, becoming an independent city and limiting its political boundaries. In 1904, it hosted the Louisiana Purchase Exposition, also known as the St. Louis World's Fair, and the Summer Olympics.

St. Louis is designated as one of 173 global cities by the Globalization and World Cities Research Network. The GDP of Greater St. Louis was $226.6 billion in 2023. St. Louis has a diverse economy with strengths in the service, manufacturing, trade, transportation, and aviation industries. It is home to fourteen Fortune 1000 companies, seven of which are also Fortune 500 companies. Federal agencies headquartered in the city or with significant operations there include the Federal Reserve Bank of St. Louis, the U.S. Department of Agriculture, and the National Geospatial-Intelligence Agency.

The city's attractions include the 630-foot (192 m) Gateway Arch, the Saint Louis Zoo, Forest Park, the City Museum, the Missouri Botanical Garden, the Saint Louis Science Center, and the Saint Louis Art Museum.

Major research universities in Greater St. Louis include Washington University in St. Louis, Saint Louis University, and the University of Missouri–St. Louis. The Washington University Medical Center hosts an agglomeration of medical and pharmaceutical institutions, including Barnes-Jewish Hospital. St. Louis has four professional sports teams: the St. Louis Cardinals of Major League Baseball, the St. Louis Blues of the National Hockey League, St. Louis City SC of Major League Soccer, and the St. Louis Battlehawks of the United Football League.

== History ==
=== Mississippian culture and European exploration ===
Historical affiliations

Kingdom of France 1690s–1763
Kingdom of Spain 1763–1800
French First Republic 1800–1803
United States 1803–present

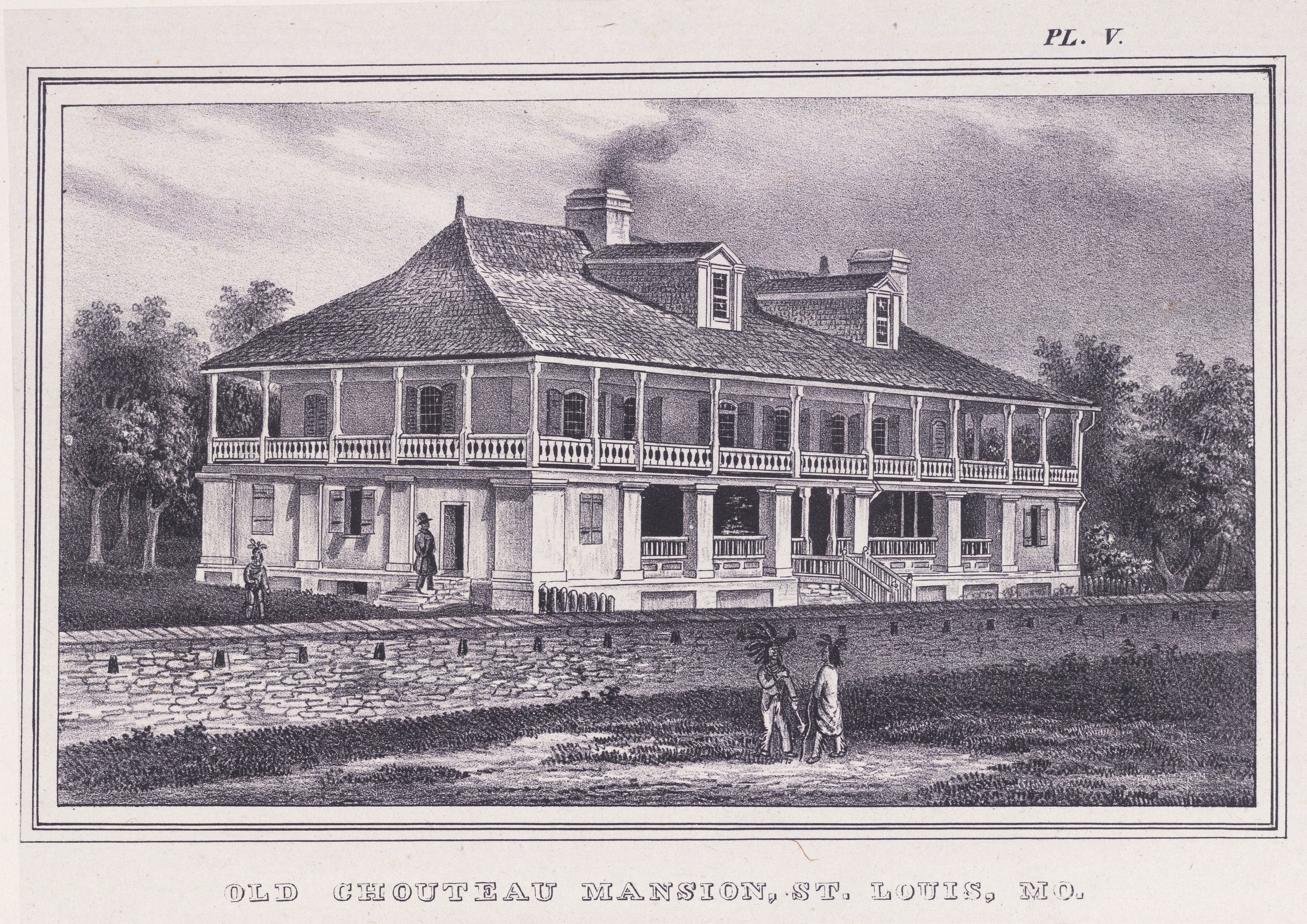
The home of Auguste Chouteau is in St. Louis. Gilbert Antoine de St. Maxent, Chouteau, and Pierre Laclède founded St. Louis in 1764.

The area that became St. Louis was a center of the Native American Mississippian culture, which built numerous temple and residential earthwork mounds on both sides of the Mississippi River. Their major regional center was at Cahokia Mounds, active from 900 to 1500. Due to numerous major earthworks within St. Louis boundaries, the city was nicknamed "Mound City". These mounds were mostly demolished during the city's development. Historic Native American tribes in the area encountered by early Europeans included the Siouan-speaking Osage people, whose territory extended west, and the Illiniwek. Sugarloaf Mound in South St. Louis was repatriated to the Osage Nation in 2025.

European exploration of the area was first recorded in 1673, when French explorers Louis Jolliet and Jacques Marquette traveled through the Mississippi River valley. Five years later, La Salle claimed the region for France as part of La Louisiane, also known as Louisiana. The earliest European settlements in the Illinois Country (also known as Upper Louisiana) were built by the French during the 1690s and early 1700s at Cahokia, Kaskaskia, and Fort de Chartres. Migrants from the French villages on the east side of the Mississippi River, such as Kaskaskia, also founded Ste. Genevieve in the 1730s.

In 1764, after France lost the Seven Years' War, Pierre Laclède and his stepson Auguste Chouteau founded what was to become the city of St. Louis. (French lands east of the Mississippi had been ceded to Great Britain and the lands west of the Mississippi to Spain; Catholic France and Spain were 18th-century allies. Louis XV of France and Charles III of Spain were cousins, both from the House of Bourbon.) The French families built the city's economy on the fur trade with the Osage, and with more distant tribes along the Missouri River. The Chouteau brothers gained a monopoly from Spain on the fur trade with Santa Fe. French colonists used African slaves as domestic servants and workers in the city.

During the negotiations for the 1763 Treaty of Paris, French negotiators agreed to transfer France's colonial territories west of the Mississippi and Missouri rivers to New Spain to compensate for Spanish territorial losses during the war. These areas remained under Spanish control until 1803, when they were transferred to the French First Republic. During the American Revolutionary War, St. Louis was unsuccessfully attacked by British-allied Native Americans in the 1780 Battle of St. Louis.

=== Founding ===
The founding of St. Louis was preceded by a trading business between Gilbert Antoine de St. Maxent and Pierre Laclède (Liguest) in late 1763. St. Maxent invested in a Mississippi River expedition led by Laclède, who searched for a location to base the company's fur trading operations. Though Ste. Genevieve was already established as a trading center, he sought a place less prone to flooding. He found an elevated area overlooking the flood plain of the Mississippi River, not far south from its confluence with the Missouri and Illinois rivers. In addition to having an advantageous natural drainage system, there were nearby forested areas to supply timber and grasslands which could easily be converted for agricultural purposes. Laclède declared that this place "might become, hereafter, one of the finest cities in America". He dispatched his 14-year-old stepson, Auguste Chouteau, to the site, with the support of 30 settlers in February 1764.

Laclède arrived at the future town site two months later and produced a plan for St. Louis based on the New Orleans street plan. The default block size was 240 by 300 feet, with just three long avenues running parallel to the west bank of the Mississippi. He established a public corridor of 300 feet fronting the river, but later this area was released for private development.

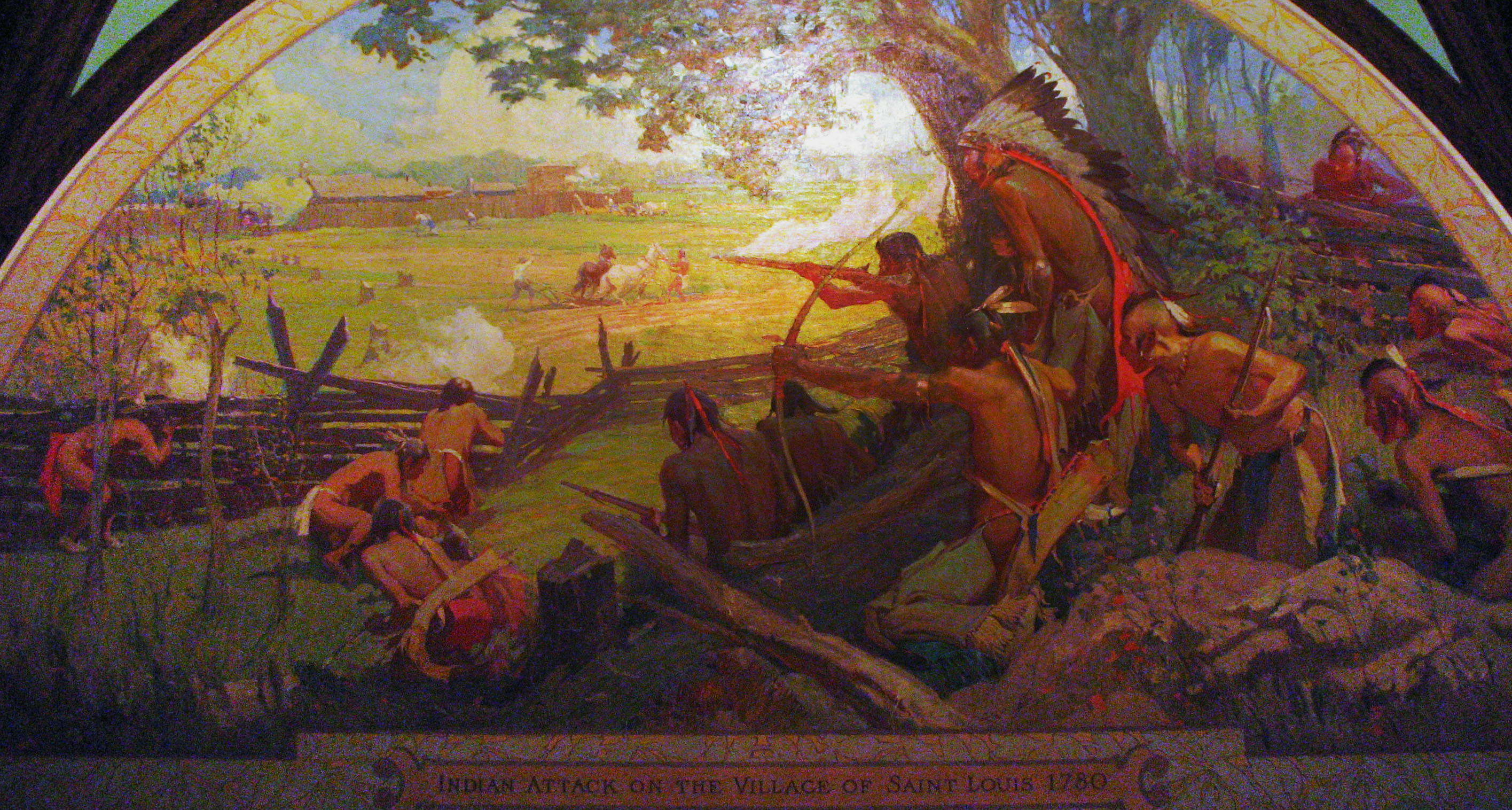
The mural Indian Attack on the Village of St. Louis, 1780, depicts that during the American Revolutionary War, St. Louis was unsuccessfully attacked by British-allied Native Americans in the Battle of St. Louis in 1780.

For the city's first few years, it was not recognized by any governments. Although the settlement was thought to be under the control of the Spanish government, no one asserted any authority over it, and thus St. Louis had no local government. This vacuum led Laclède to assume civil control, and all problems were disposed in public settings, such as communal meetings. In addition, Laclède granted new settlers lots in town and the surrounding countryside. In hindsight, many of these original settlers thought of these first few years as "the golden age of St. Louis". In 1763, the Native Americans in the region around St. Louis began expressing dissatisfaction with the victorious British, objecting to their refusal to continue to the French tradition of supplying gifts to Natives. Odawa chieftain Pontiac began forming a pan-tribal alliance to counter British control over the region but received little support from the indigenous residents of St. Louis. By 1765, the city began receiving visits from representatives of the British, French, and Spanish governments.

St. Louis was transferred to the French First Republic in 1800 (although all of the colonial lands continued to be administered by Spanish officials), then sold by the French to the U.S. in 1803 as part of the Louisiana Purchase. St. Louis became the capital of, and gateway to, the new territory. Shortly after the official transfer of authority was made, the Lewis and Clark Expedition was commissioned by President Thomas Jefferson. The expedition departed from St. Louis in May 1804 along the Missouri River to explore the vast territory. There were hopes of finding a water route to the Pacific Ocean, but the party had to go overland in the Upper West. They reached the Pacific Ocean via the Columbia River in summer 1805. They returned, reaching St. Louis on September 23, 1806. Both Lewis and Clark lived in St. Louis after the expedition. Many other explorers, settlers, and trappers (such as Ashley's Hundred) would later take a similar route to the West.

=== 19th century ===
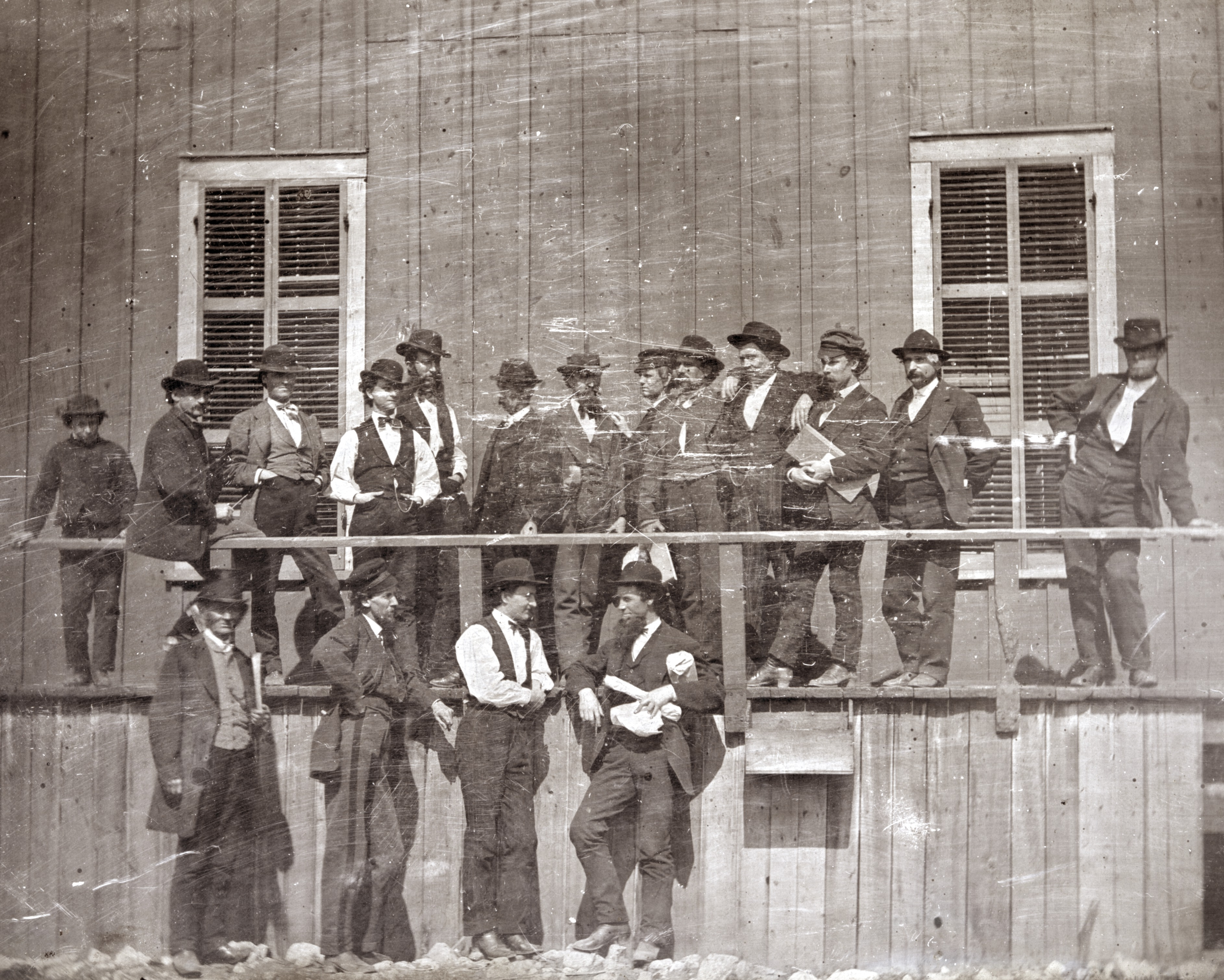
White men pose in 1852 at Lynch's slave market at 104 Locust Street

The city elected its first municipal legislators (called trustees) in 1808. Steamboats first arrived in St. Louis in 1817, improving connections with New Orleans and eastern markets. Missouri was admitted as a state in 1821. St. Louis was incorporated as a city in 1822, and continued to develop largely due to its busy port and trade connections.

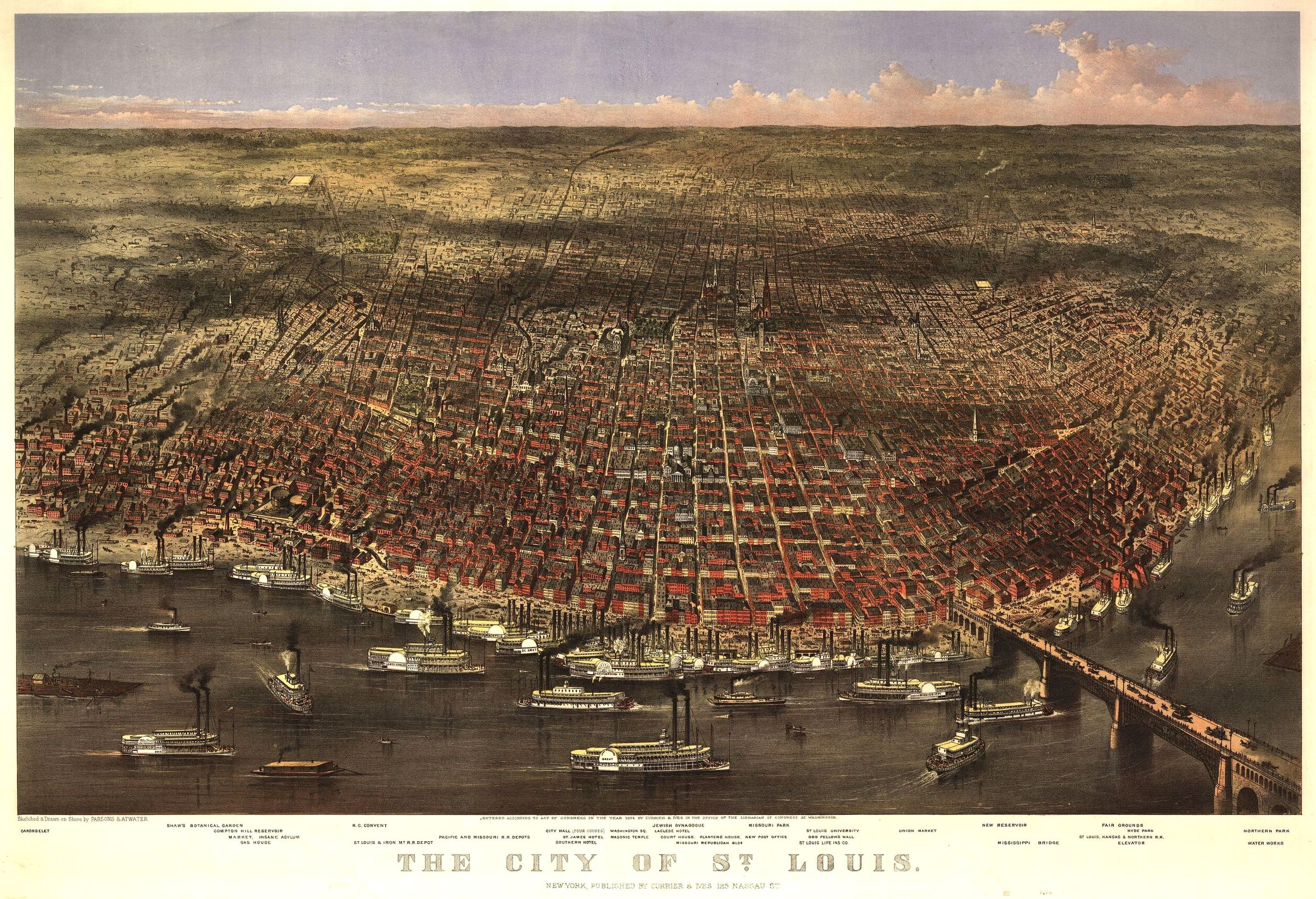
City of St. Louis and Riverfront, 1874

Immigrants from Ireland and Germany arrived in St. Louis in significant numbers starting in the 1840s, and the population of St. Louis grew from less than 20,000 inhabitants in 1840, to 77,860 in 1850, to more than 160,000 by 1860. By the mid-1800s, St. Louis had a greater population than New Orleans.

Settled by many Southerners in a slave state, the city was split in political sympathies and became polarized during the American Civil War. In the decades preceding the war, tensions ran high between abolitionists and pro-slavery residents, exemplified by the repeated destruction of abolitionist Elijah Parish Lovejoy's printing press and his eventual murder by a mob in nearby Alton, Illinois in 1837. In 1861, 28 civilians were killed in a clash with Union troops. The war hurt St. Louis economically, due to the Union blockade of river traffic to the south on the Mississippi River. The St. Louis Arsenal constructed ironclads for the Union Navy.

Slaves worked in many jobs on the waterfront and on the riverboats. Given the city's location close to the free state of Illinois and others, some slaves escaped to freedom. Others, especially women with children, sued in court in freedom suits, and several prominent local attorneys aided slaves in these suits. About half the slaves achieved freedom in hundreds of suits before the American Civil War began in 1861.

After the war, St. Louis profited via trade with the West, aided by the 1874 completion of the Eads Bridge, named for its design engineer. Industrial developments on both banks of the river were linked by the bridge, the second in the Midwest over the Mississippi River after the Hennepin Avenue Bridge in Minneapolis. The bridge connects St. Louis, Missouri to East St. Louis, Illinois. The Eads Bridge became a symbolic image of the city of St. Louis, from the time of its erection until 1965 when the Gateway Arch Bridge was constructed. The bridge crosses the St. Louis riverfront between Laclede's Landing, to the north, and the grounds of the Gateway Arch, to the south. Today the road deck has been restored, allowing vehicular and pedestrian traffic to cross the river. The St. Louis MetroLink light rail system has used the rail deck since 1993. An estimated 8,500 vehicles pass through it daily.

On August 22, 1876, the city of St. Louis voted to secede from St. Louis County and become an independent city, and, following a recount of the votes in November, officially did so in March 1877. The 1877 St. Louis general strike caused significant upheaval, in a fight for the eight-hour day and the banning of child labor.

Industrial production continued to increase during the late 19th century. Major corporations such as the Anheuser-Busch brewery, Ralston Purina company and Desloge Consolidated Lead Company were established at St. Louis which was also home to several brass era automobile companies, including the Success Automobile Manufacturing Company; St. Louis is the site of the Wainwright Building, a skyscraper designed in 1892 by architect Louis Sullivan.

=== 20th century ===
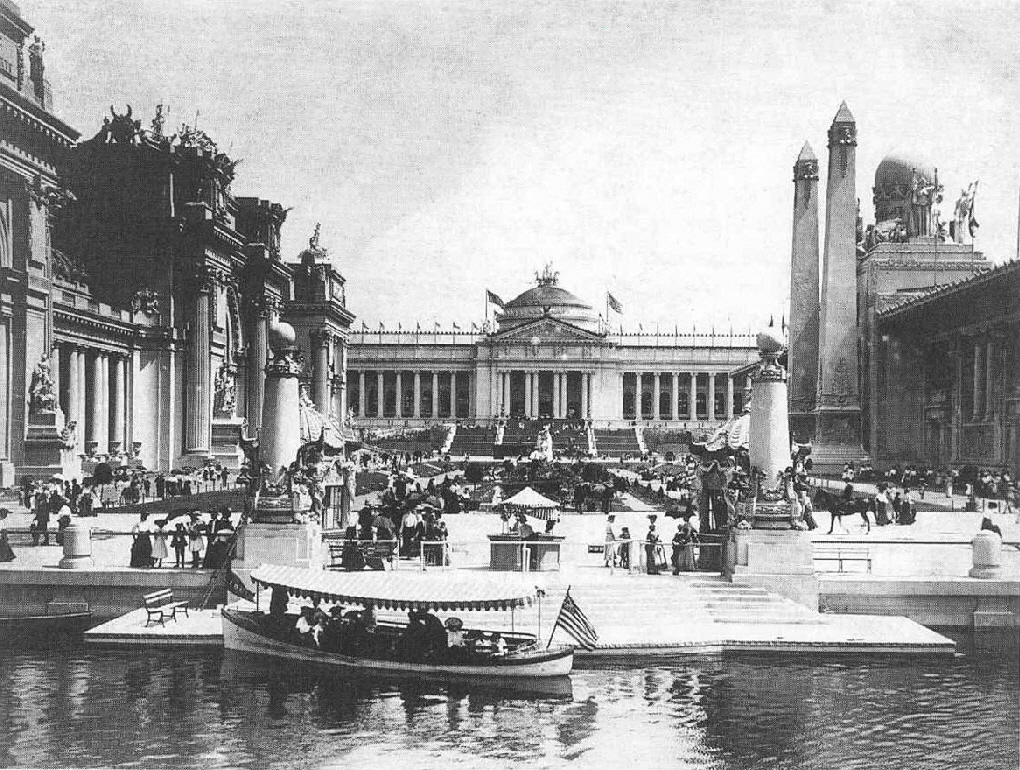
The Government Building is at the 1904 World's Fair.

In 1900, the entire streetcar system was shut down by a several months-long strike, with significant unrest occurring in the city and violence against the striking workers.

In 1904, the city hosted the World's Fair and the Olympics, becoming the first non-European city to host the games. The formal name for the 1904 World's Fair was the Louisiana Purchase Exposition. Permanent facilities and structures remaining from the fair are located in Forest Park, and other notable structures within the park's boundaries include the St. Louis Art Museum, the St. Louis Zoo and the Missouri History Museum, and Tower Grove Park and the Botanical Gardens.

After the Civil War, social and racial discrimination in housing and employment were common in St. Louis. In 1916, during the Jim Crow Era, St. Louis passed a residential segregation ordinance saying that if 75% of the residents of a neighborhood were of a certain race, no one from a different race was allowed to move in. That ordinance was struck down in a court challenge, by the NAACP, after which racial covenants were used to prevent the sale of houses in certain neighborhoods to "persons not of Caucasian race". Again, St. Louisans offered a lawsuit in challenge, and such covenants were ruled unconstitutional by the U.S. Supreme Court in 1948 in Shelley v. Kraemer.

In 1926, Douglass University, a historically black university was founded by B. F. Bowles in St. Louis, and at the time no other college in St. Louis County admitted black students.

In the first half of the 20th century, St. Louis was a destination in the Great Migration of African Americans from the rural South seeking better opportunities. During World War II, the NAACP campaigned to integrate war factories. In 1964, civil rights activists protested at the construction of the Gateway Arch to publicize their effort to gain entry for African Americans into the skilled trade unions, where they were underrepresented. The Department of Justice filed the first suit against the unions under the Civil Rights Act of 1964.

Between 1900 and 1929, St. Louis, had about 220 automakers, close to 10 percent of all American carmakers, about half of which built cars exclusively in St. Louis. Notable names include Dorris, Gardner and Moon.

In the first part of the century, St. Louis had some of the worst air pollution in the United States. In April 1940, the city banned the use of soft coal mined in nearby states. The city hired inspectors to ensure that only anthracite was burned. By 1946, the city had reduced air pollution by about 75%.

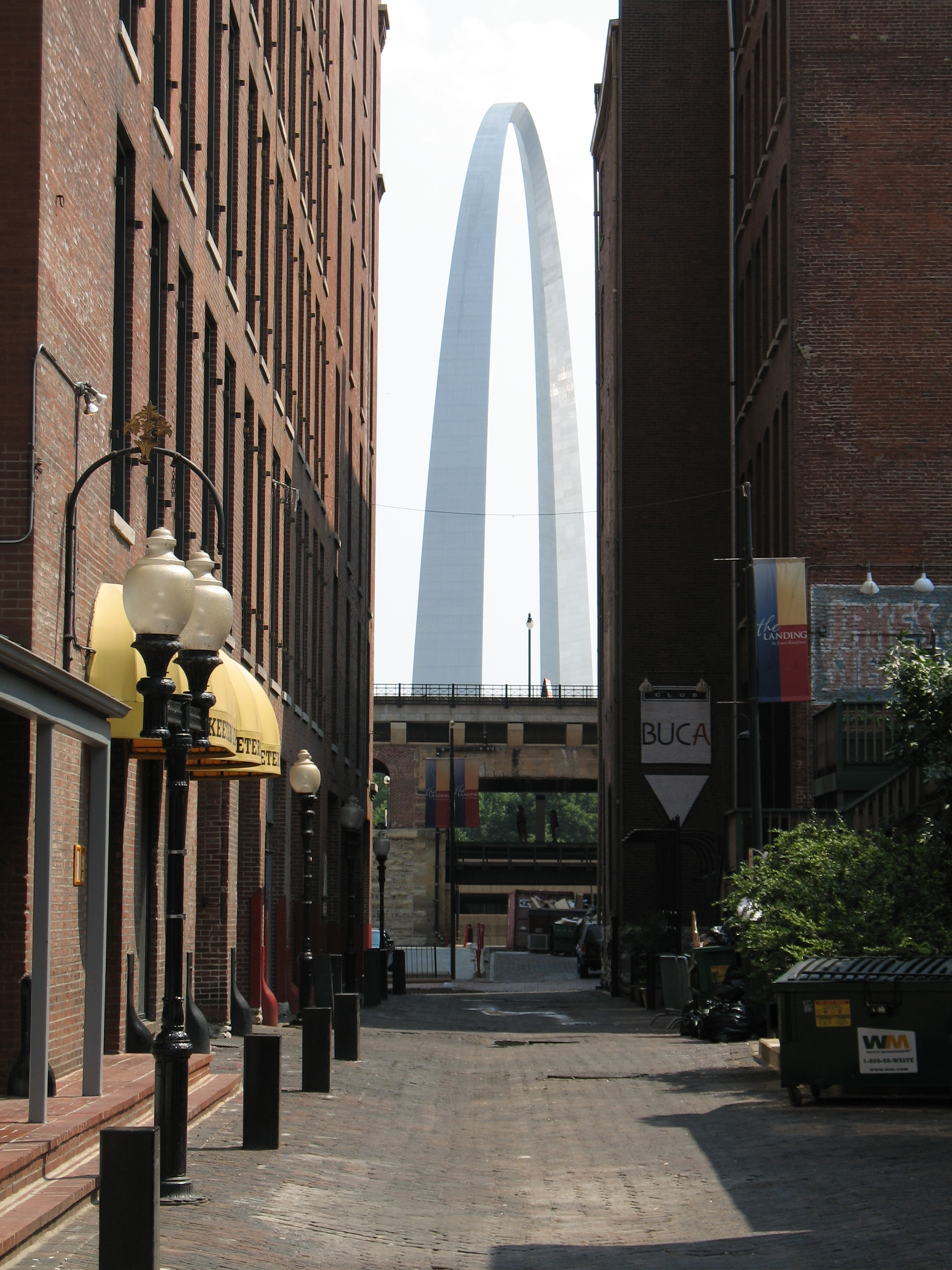
The Arch (completed 1965) is visible from Laclede's Landing, the remaining section of St. Louis's commercial riverfront.

De jure educational segregation continued into the 1950s, and de facto segregation continued into the 1970s, leading to a court challenge and interdistrict desegregation agreement. Students have been bused mostly from the city to county school districts to have opportunities for integrated classes, although the city has created magnet schools to attract students.

St. Louis, like many Midwestern cities, expanded in the early 20th century due to industrialization, which provided jobs to new generations of immigrants and migrants from the South. It reached its peak population of 856,796 at the 1950 census. Suburbanization from the 1950s through the 1990s dramatically reduced the city's population, as did restructuring of industry and loss of jobs. The effects of suburbanization were exacerbated by the small geographical size of St. Louis due to its earlier decision to become an independent city, and it lost much of its tax base. During the 19th and 20th century, most major cities aggressively annexed surrounding areas as residential development occurred away from the central city; however, St. Louis was unable to do so.

Several urban renewal projects were built in the 1950s, as the city worked to replace old and substandard housing. Some of these were poorly designed and resulted in problems. One prominent example, Pruitt–Igoe, became a symbol of failure in public housing, and was torn down less than two decades after it was built. The degradation and razing of Mill Creek Valley in this time was featured as an example of disenfranchisement in the 2024 Reparations Commission Report.

Since the 1980s, several revitalization efforts have focused on Downtown St. Louis.

=== 21st century ===
The urban revitalization projects that started in the 1980s continued into the new century. The city's old garment district, centered on Washington Avenue in the Downtown and Downtown West neighborhoods, experienced major development starting in the late 1990s as many of the old factory and warehouse buildings were converted into lofts. The American Planning Association designated Washington Avenue as one of 10 Great Streets for 2011. The Cortex Innovation Community, located within the city's Central West End neighborhood, was founded in 2002 and has become a multi-billion dollar economic engine for the region, with companies such as Microsoft and Boeing currently leasing office space. The Forest Park Southeast neighborhood in the central corridor has seen major investment starting in the early 2010s. Between 2013 and 2018, over $50 million worth of residential construction has been built in the neighborhood. The population of the neighborhood has increased by 19% from the 2010 to 2020 Census.

The St. Louis Rams of the National Football League controversially returned to Los Angeles in 2016. The city of St. Louis sued the NFL in 2017, alleging the league breached its relocation guidelines to profit at the expense of the city. In 2021, the NFL and Rams owner Stan Kroenke agreed to settle out of court with the city for $790 million.

=== Tornadoes of St. Louis ===
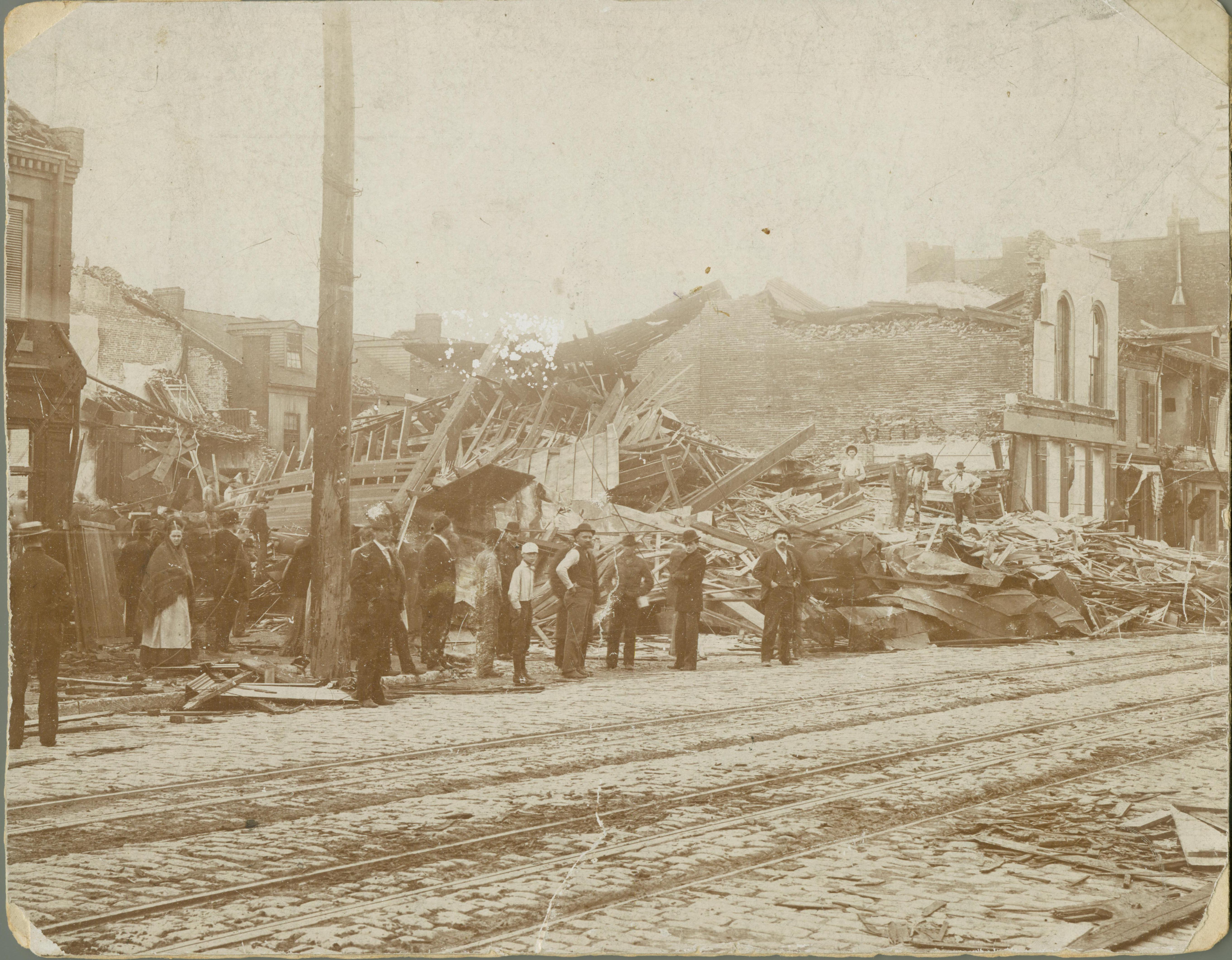
South Broadway had a tornado on May 27, 1896.

St. Louis since official record-keeping began in 1950, has seen numerous tornadoes occur within the city or its metropolitan areas. Even before 1950, the area endured many deadly, and devastating tornadoes. On 8 March 1871, an estimated F3 tornado tracked through the central business district, killing 9 people and injuring 60 others before ending before ending in East St. Louis, Illinois. On 27 May 1896 during a major tornado outbreak sequence, an F4-estimated storm struck the downtown area in Missouri, and eastern metro in Illinois. The tornado killed at least 255 people and injured over a thousand others, becoming one of the deadliest and most destructive tornadoes in American history. During the 20th century, in both of February 1959 and January 1967, two separate tornado outbreaks struck around the region, the strongest being F4 tornadoes of their respective outbreaks. The 1959 F4 tornado was the third deadliest to occur around the St. Louis area, killing 21. The first of these two tornadoes also brought the inquiry for tornado sirens in the city, while the 1967 storm came to the conclusion and installed them.

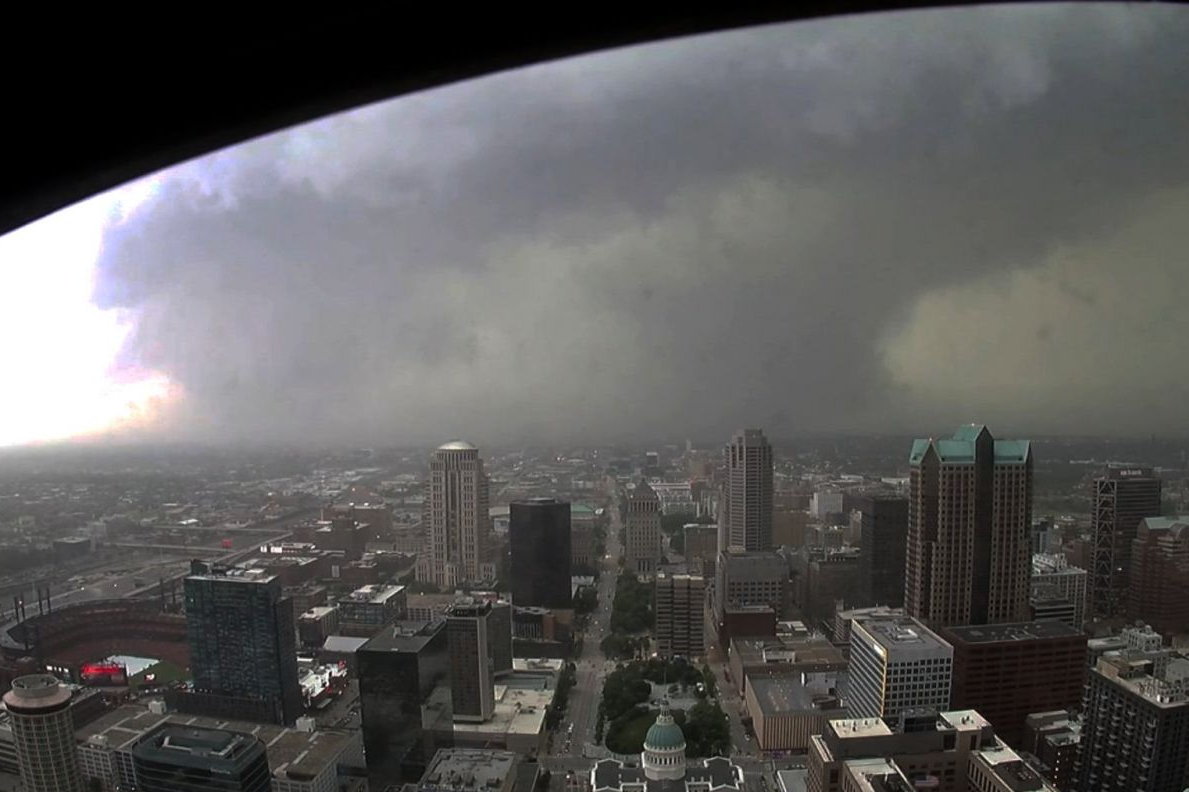
A large tornado seen from the Gateway Arch. Taken in 2025.

In the modern era of the 21st century, the city and metro continued to foresee these impactful events. On Good Friday, 22 April 2011, a violent EF4 tornado impacted the northern suburbs and St. Louis Lambert International Airport, towards Granite City, Illinois. It was the first violent (F4/EF4+) tornado to occur within the limits since the 1967 tornado, however it killed no people and only caused five injuries. On 16 May 2025, a massive EF3 tornado, up to 1.8 miles (2.9 km) wide, struck parts of St. Louis County and City, killing 5 people before moving across the Mississippi River into Illinois and dissipating. This was the largest tornado ever recorded to occur in the region. According to mayor Cara Spencer, the tornado produced up to $1.6 billion in damage, (Note: The aforementioned damage totals are in 2025 USD.) and Missouri governor Mike Kehoe stated on behalf of the Federal Emergency Management Agency that the scope of residential damage was the worst since 22 May 2011, when an EF5 tornado caused devastating damage in Joplin, Missouri over a decade prior.

== Geography ==
=== Topography ===
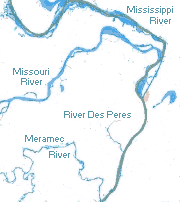
Rivers in the St. Louis area

According to the United States Census Bureau, St. Louis has a total area of 66 square miles (170 km^{2}), of which 62 square miles (160 km^{2}) is land and 4.1 square miles (11 km^{2}) (6.2%) is water. The city is built on bluffs and terraces that rise 100–200 feet above the western banks of the Mississippi River, just south its confluence with the Missouri River and directly across from Illinois. The eastern city limits follow the Mississippi River as the state border. Much of the area is a fertile and gently rolling prairie that features low hills and broad, shallow valleys. Both the Mississippi River and the Missouri River have cut large valleys with wide flood plains.

Near the southern boundary of the city of St. Louis (separating it from St. Louis County) is the River des Peres, practically the only river or stream within the city limits that is not entirely underground. Most of River des Peres was confined to a channel or put underground in the 1920s and early 1930s. The lower section of the river was the site of some of the worst flooding of the Great Flood of 1993.

The St. Louis area experienced a significant flood in 1973, primarily caused by the Mississippi River reaching its highest level in over 150 years. While heavy rainfall and snowmelt contributed, the flood was exacerbated by a saturated drainage basin and high water levels in the Missouri River. The flooding led to levee failures, inundation of homes, businesses, and parkland, and prompted evacuations and sandbagging efforts.

Limestone and dolomite of the Mississippian epoch underlie the area, and parts of the city are karst in nature. This is particularly true of the area south of downtown, which has numerous sinkholes and caves. Most of the caves in the city have been sealed, but many springs are visible along the riverfront. Coal, brick clay, and millerite ore were once mined in the city. The predominant surface rock, known as St. Louis limestone, is used as dimension stone and rubble for construction.

=== Architecture ===
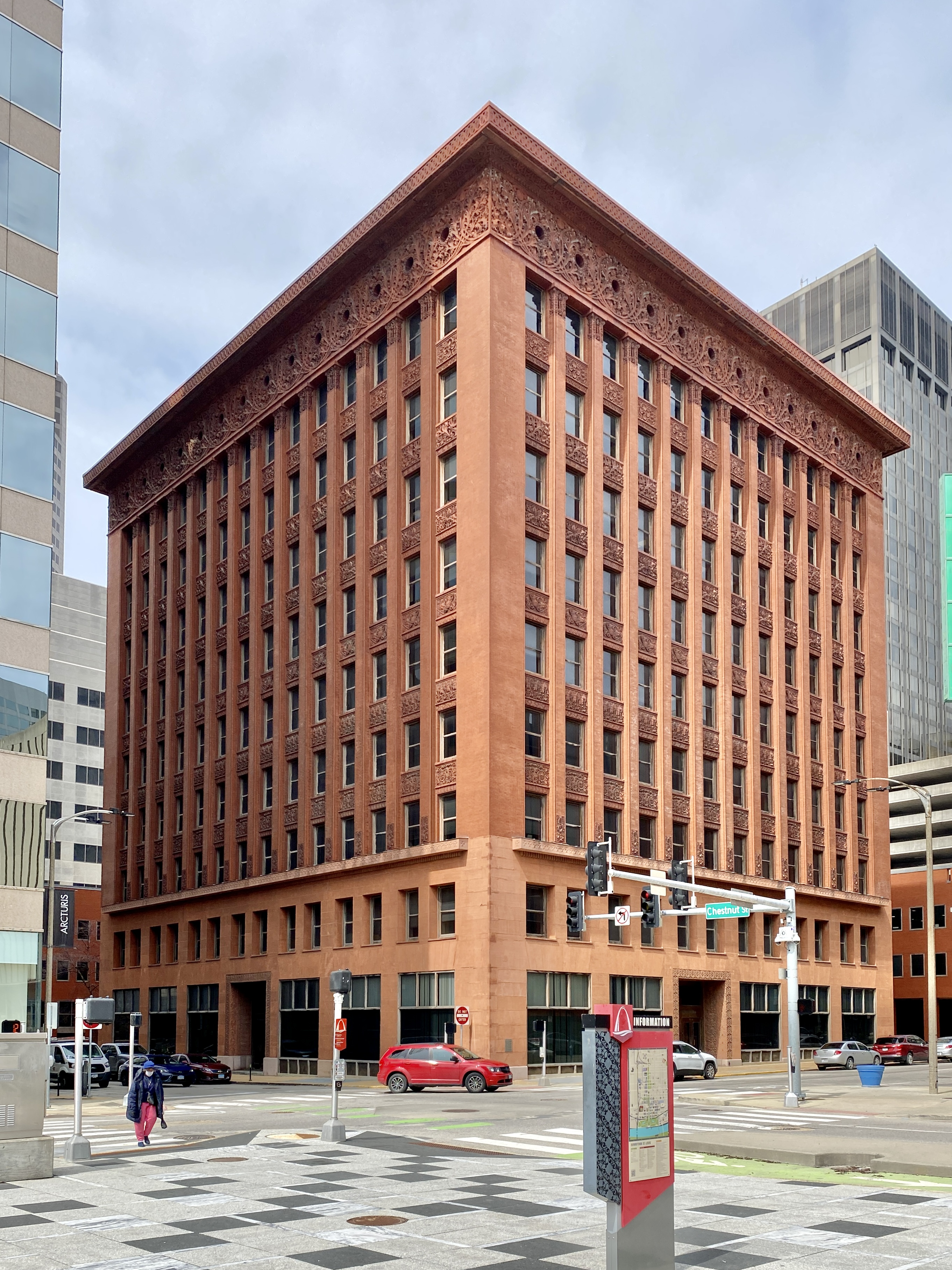
The Wainwright Building (1891) is an important early skyscraper designed by Louis Sullivan.

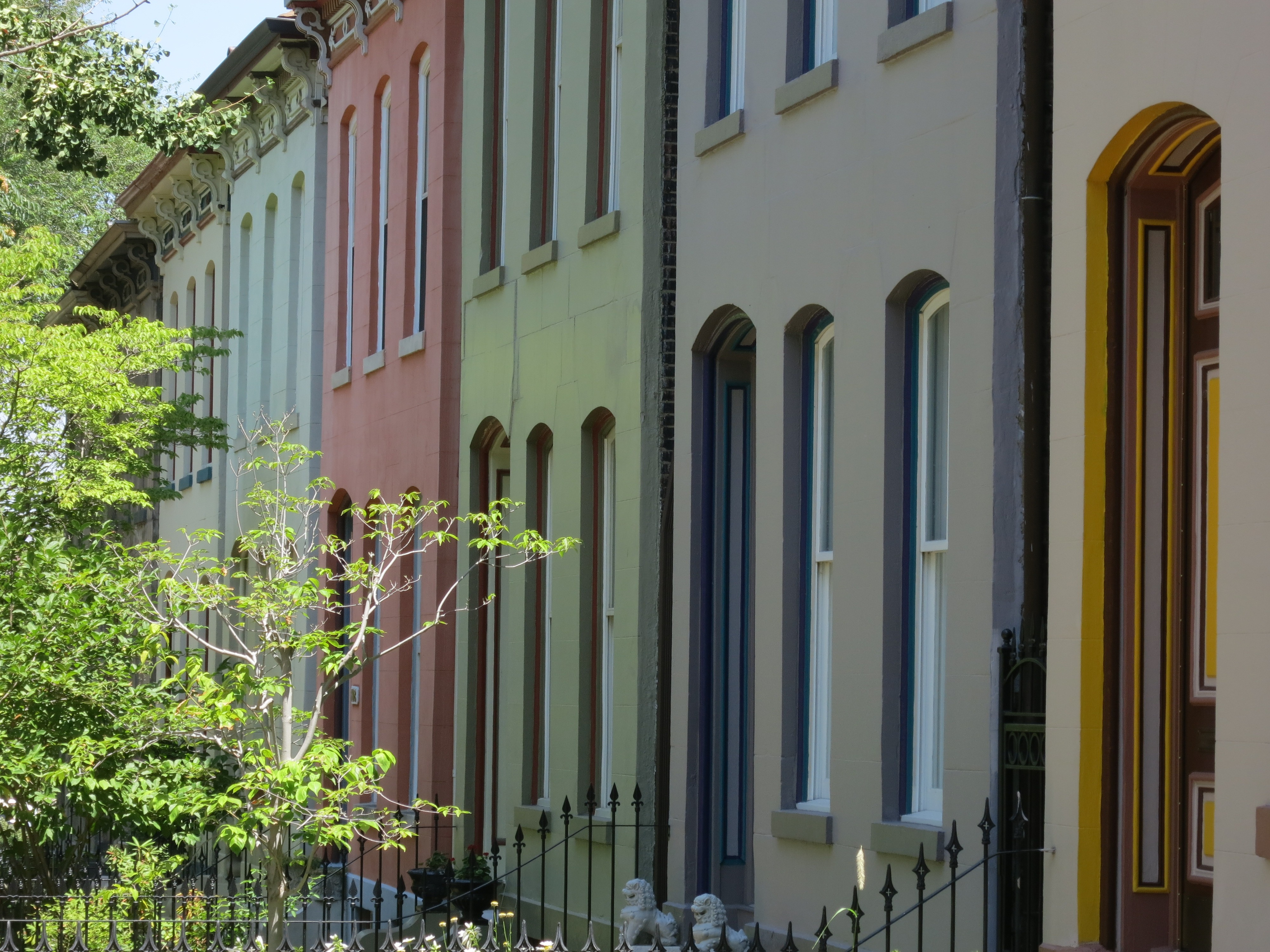
Many houses in Lafayette Square are built with a blending of Greek Revival, Federal and Italianate styles.

The architecture of St. Louis exhibits a variety of commercial, residential, and monumental architecture. St. Louis is known for the Gateway Arch, the tallest monument constructed in the United States at 630 feet (190 m). The Arch pays homage to Thomas Jefferson and St. Louis's position as the gateway to the West. Architectural influences reflected in the area include French Colonial, German, early American, and modern architectural styles.

Several examples of religious structures are extant from the pre-Civil War period, and most reflect the common residential styles of the time. Among the earliest is the Basilica of St. Louis, King of France (referred to as the Old Cathedral). The Basilica was built between 1831 and 1834 in the Federal style. Other religious buildings from the period include SS. Cyril and Methodius Church (1857) in the Romanesque Revival style and Christ Church Cathedral (completed in 1867, designed in 1859) in the Gothic Revival style.

A few civic buildings were constructed during the early 19th century. The original St. Louis courthouse was built in 1826 and featured a Federal style stone facade with a rounded portico. However, this courthouse was replaced during renovation and expansion of the building in the 1850s. The Old St. Louis County Courthouse (known as the Old Courthouse) was completed in 1864 and was notable for having a cast iron dome and for being the tallest structure in Missouri until 1894. Finally, a customs house was constructed in the Greek Revival style in 1852, but was demolished and replaced in 1873 by the U.S. Customhouse and Post Office.

Because much of the city's commercial and industrial development was centered along the riverfront, many pre-Civil War buildings were demolished during construction of the Gateway Arch. The city's remaining architectural heritage of the era includes a multi-block district of cobblestone streets and brick and cast-iron warehouses called Laclede's Landing. Now popular for its restaurants and nightclubs, the district is located north of Gateway Arch along the riverfront. Other industrial buildings from the era include some portions of the Anheuser-Busch Brewery, which date to the 1860s.

St. Louis saw a vast expansion in variety and number of religious buildings during the late 19th century and early 20th century. The largest and most ornate of these is the Cathedral Basilica of St. Louis, designed by Thomas P. Barnett and constructed between 1907 and 1914 in the Neo-Byzantine style. The St. Louis Cathedral, as it is known, has one of the largest mosaic collections in the world. Another landmark in religious architecture of St. Louis is the St. Stanislaus Kostka, which is an example of the Polish Cathedral style. Among the other major designs of the period were St. Alphonsus Liguori (known as The Rock Church) (1867) in the Gothic Revival and Second Presbyterian Church of St. Louis (1900) in Richardsonian Romanesque.

By the 1900 census, St. Louis was the fourth largest city in the country. In 1904, the city hosted a world's fair at Forest Park called the Louisiana Purchase Exposition. Its architectural legacy is somewhat scattered. Among the fair-related cultural institutions in the park are the St. Louis Art Museum designed by Cass Gilbert, part of the remaining lagoon at the foot of Art Hill, and the Flight Cage at the St. Louis Zoo. The Missouri History Museum was built afterward, with the profit from the fair. But 1904 left other assets to the city, like Theodore Link's 1894 St. Louis Union Station, and an improved Forest Park.

One US Bank Plaza, the local headquarters for US Bancorp, was constructed in 1976 in the structural expressionist style. Several notable postmodern commercial skyscrapers were built downtown in the 1970s and 1980s, including the former AT&T building at 909 Chestnut Street (1986), and One Metropolitan Square (1989), which is the tallest building in St. Louis.

During the 1990s, St. Louis saw the construction of the largest United States courthouse by area, the Thomas F. Eagleton United States Courthouse (2000). The Eagleton Courthouse is home to the United States District Court for the Eastern District of Missouri and the United States Court of Appeals for the Eighth Circuit. The most recent high-rise buildings in St. Louis include two residential towers: One Hundred in the Central West End neighborhood and One Cardinal Way in the Downtown neighborhood.

=== Neighborhoods ===
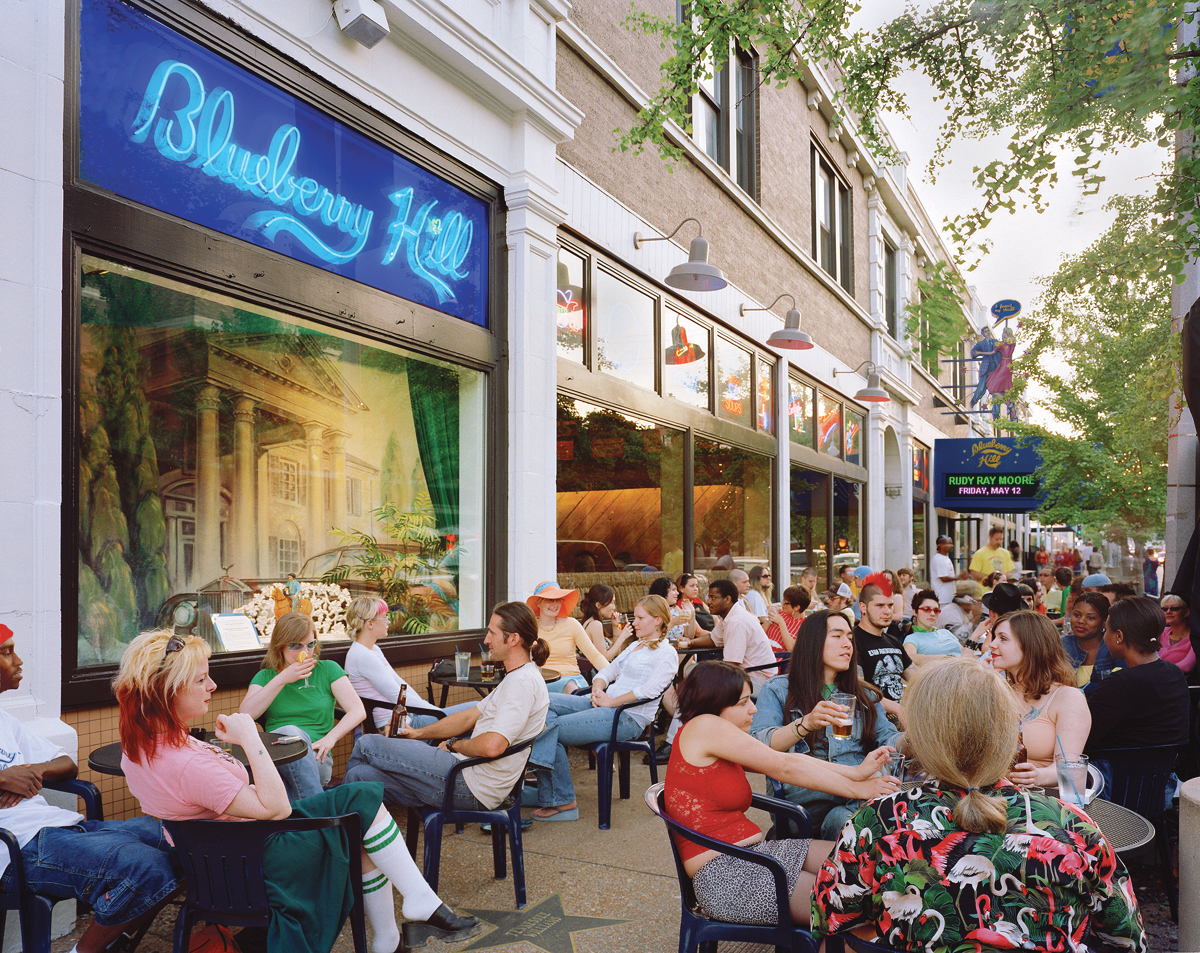
The Delmar Loop is a neighborhood close to Washington University, bordering the city and St. Louis County.

The city is divided into 79 officially-recognized neighborhoods.

=== Climate ===
The urban area of St. Louis has a humid subtropical climate (Köppen: Cfa); however, its metropolitan region even to the south may present a hot-summer humid continental climate (Dfa), which shows the effect of the urban heat island in the city. The city experiences hot, humid summers and chilly to cold winters. It is subject to both cold Arctic air and hot, humid tropical air from the Gulf of Mexico. The average annual temperature recorded at nearby Lambert–St. Louis International Airport, is 57.4 °F (14.1 °C). 100 and 0 °F (38 and −18 °C) temperatures can be seen on an average 3 and 1 days per year, respectively. Precipitation averages 41.70 inches (1,100 mm), but has ranged from 20.59 in (523 mm) in 1953 to 61.24 in (1,555 mm) in 2015. The highest recorded temperature in St. Louis was 115 °F (46 °C) on July 14, 1954, and the lowest was −22 °F (−30 °C) on January 5, 1884.

St. Louis experiences thunderstorms 48 days a year on average. Especially in the spring, these storms can often be severe, with high winds, large hail and tornadoes. Lying within the hotbed of Tornado Alley, St. Louis is one of the most frequently tornado-struck metropolitan areas in the U.S. and has an extensive history of damaging tornadoes. Severe flooding, such as the Great Flood of 1993, may occur in spring and summer; the (often rapid) melting of thick snow cover upstream on the Missouri or Mississippi Rivers can contribute to springtime flooding.

Climate data for St. Louis, Missouri (Lambert–St. Louis Int'l), 1991–2020 normals, (Note: Mean monthly maxima and minima (i.e. the highest and lowest temperature readings during an entire month or year) calculated based on data at said location from 1991 to 2020.) extremes 1874–present (Note: Official records for St. Louis were kept at the Weather Bureau Office from January 1874 to December 1892, Eads Bridge from January 1893 to December 1929, and at Lambert–St. Louis Int'l since January 1930.)
Month	Jan	Feb	Mar	Apr	May	Jun	Jul	Aug	Sep	Oct	Nov	Dec	Year
Record high °F (°C)	77 (25)	86 (30)	93 (34)	93 (34)	98 (37)	108 (42)	115 (46)	110 (43)	104 (40)	94 (34)	86 (30)	78 (26)	115 (46)
Mean maximum °F (°C)	64.7 (18.2)	71.0 (21.7)	79.4 (26.3)	86.4 (30.2)	90.4 (32.4)	95.5 (35.3)	99.2 (37.3)	99.1 (37.3)	93.4 (34.1)	87.0 (30.6)	75.5 (24.2)	66.9 (19.4)	100.7 (38.2)
Mean daily maximum °F (°C)	40.4 (4.7)	45.8 (7.7)	56.6 (13.7)	68.0 (20.0)	77.1 (25.1)	85.9 (29.9)	89.6 (32.0)	88.3 (31.3)	81.1 (27.3)	69.2 (20.7)	55.5 (13.1)	44.5 (6.9)	66.8 (19.3)
Daily mean °F (°C)	32.1 (0.1)	36.7 (2.6)	46.6 (8.1)	57.5 (14.2)	67.5 (19.7)	76.5 (24.7)	80.4 (26.9)	78.8 (26.0)	71.0 (21.7)	59.1 (15.1)	46.5 (8.1)	36.5 (2.5)	57.4 (14.1)
Mean daily minimum °F (°C)	23.8 (−4.6)	27.6 (−2.4)	36.7 (2.6)	47.0 (8.3)	57.9 (14.4)	67.2 (19.6)	71.1 (21.7)	69.3 (20.7)	60.9 (16.1)	49.1 (9.5)	37.4 (3.0)	28.5 (−1.9)	48.0 (8.9)
Mean minimum °F (°C)	4.4 (−15.3)	9.6 (−12.4)	17.8 (−7.9)	32.2 (0.1)	43.5 (6.4)	55.5 (13.1)	61.4 (16.3)	60.1 (15.6)	47.1 (8.4)	33.6 (0.9)	22.0 (−5.6)	11.0 (−11.7)	1.2 (−17.1)
Record low °F (°C)	−22 (−30)	−18 (−28)	−5 (−21)	20 (−7)	31 (−1)	43 (6)	51 (11)	47 (8)	32 (0)	21 (−6)	1 (−17)	−16 (−27)	−22 (−30)
Average precipitation inches (mm)	2.59 (66)	2.23 (57)	3.50 (89)	4.73 (120)	4.82 (122)	4.49 (114)	3.93 (100)	3.38 (86)	2.96 (75)	3.15 (80)	3.42 (87)	2.50 (64)	41.70 (1,059)
Average snowfall inches (cm)	5.7 (14)	4.3 (11)	2.3 (5.8)	0.2 (0.51)	0.0 (0.0)	0.0 (0.0)	0.0 (0.0)	0.0 (0.0)	0.0 (0.0)	0.0 (0.0)	0.9 (2.3)	3.2 (8.1)	16.6 (42)
Average precipitation days (≥ 0.01 in)	9.3	8.7	10.8	11.5	12.6	9.8	8.9	8.4	7.3	8.5	9.0	9.0	113.8
Average snowy days (≥ 0.1 in)	4.7	3.9	1.7	0.2	0.0	0.0	0.0	0.0	0.0	0.0	0.8	3.2	14.5
Average relative humidity (%)	73.0	72.0	68.3	63.5	66.5	67.1	68.0	70.0	71.6	68.7	72.2	75.8	69.7
Average dew point °F (°C)	20.1 (−6.6)	24.1 (−4.4)	33.1 (0.6)	42.3 (5.7)	52.9 (11.6)	62.1 (16.7)	66.6 (19.2)	65.1 (18.4)	58.6 (14.8)	46.0 (7.8)	36.0 (2.2)	25.5 (−3.6)	44.4 (6.9)
Mean monthly sunshine hours	161.2	158.3	198.3	223.5	266.5	291.9	308.9	269.8	236.1	208.4	140.9	129.9	2,593.7
Percentage possible sunshine	53	53	53	56	60	66	68	64	63	60	47	44	58
Average ultraviolet index	1.7	2.7	4.5	6.4	7.9	9.0	9.1	8.2	6.3	4.0	2.3	—	—
Source 1: NOAA (relative humidity, dew point, and sun 1961−1990)
Source 2: UV Index Today (1995 to 2022)

=== Flora and fauna ===
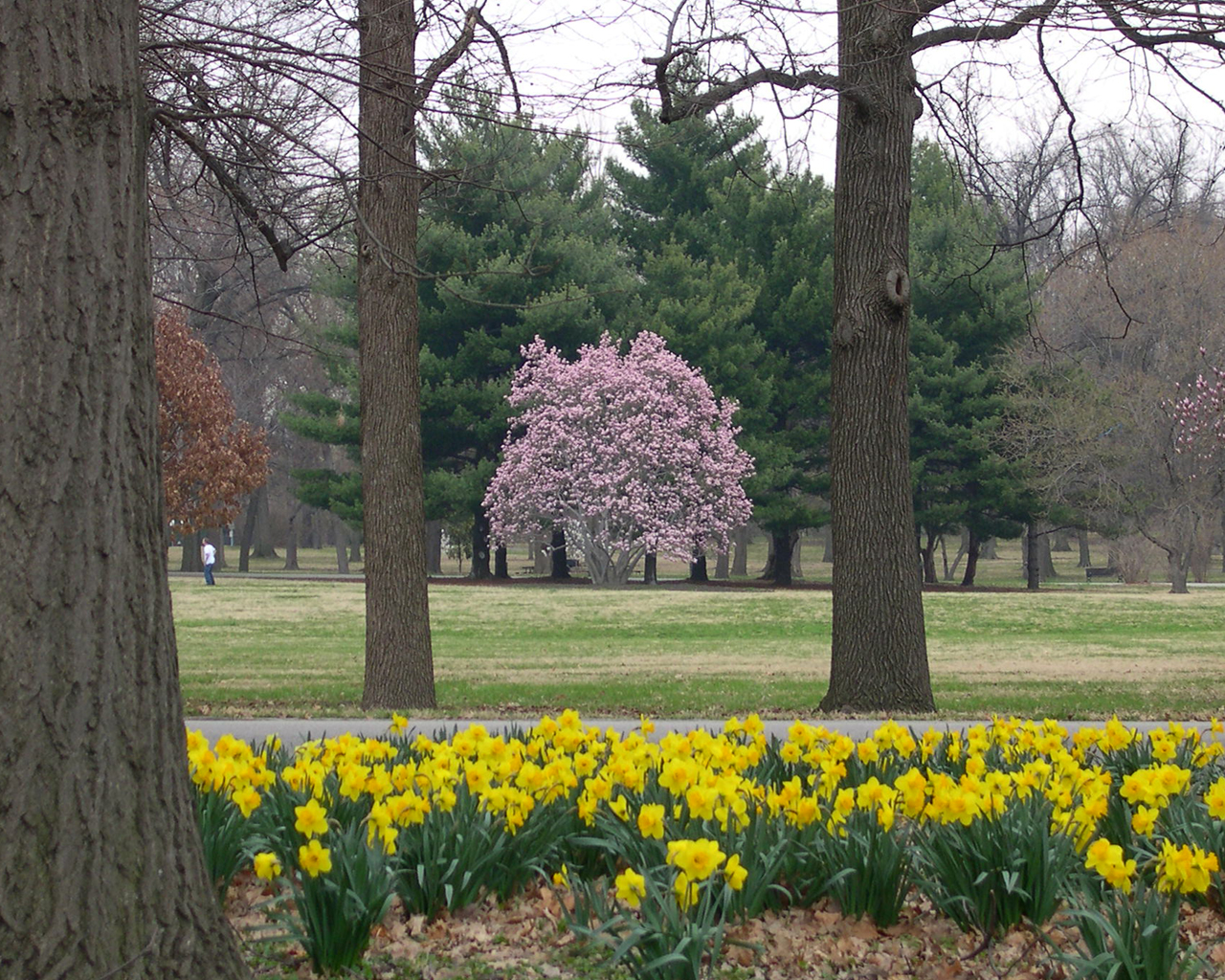
Tower Grove Park in spring

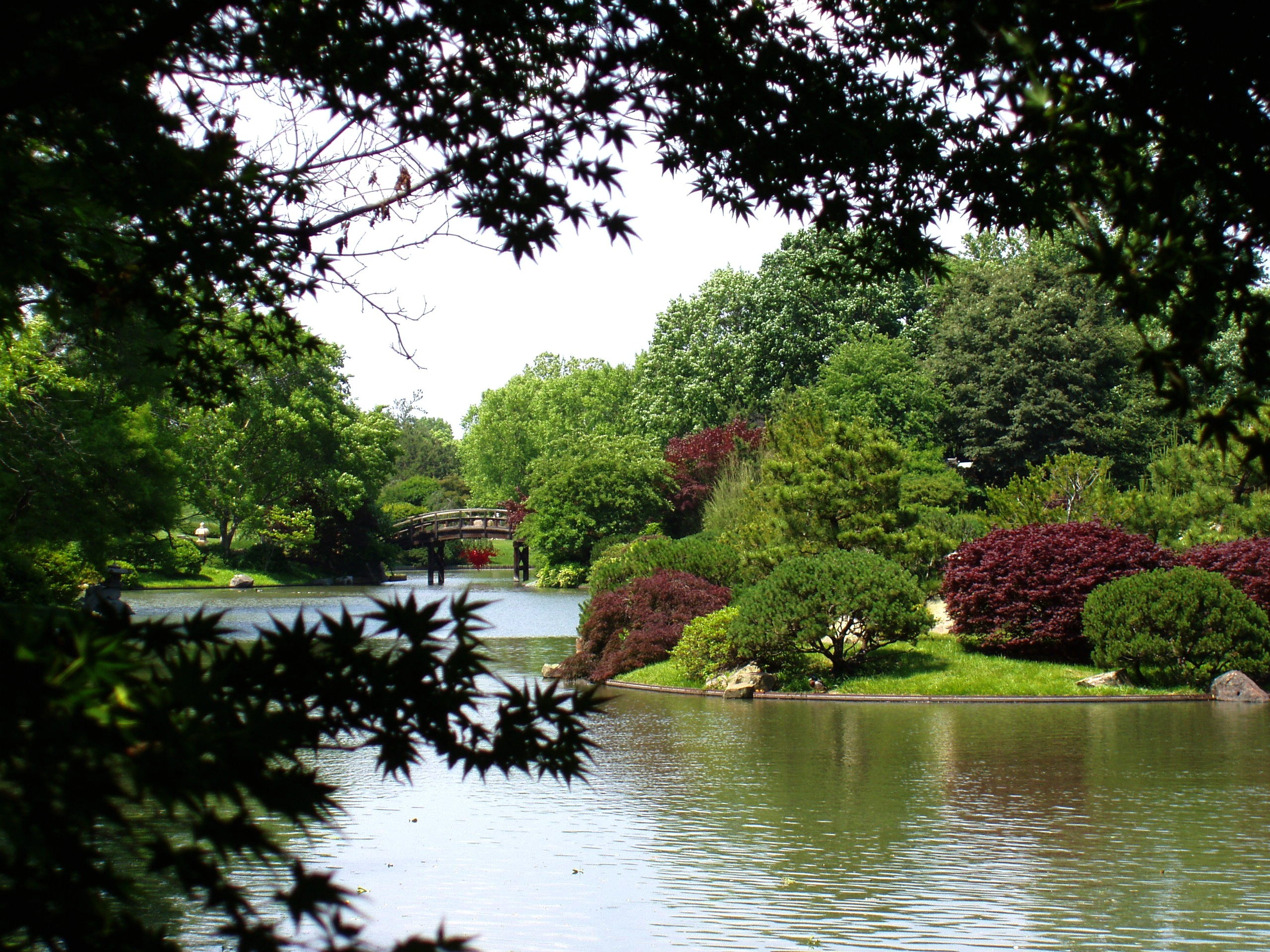
Missouri Botanical Garden

Before the founding of the city, the area was mostly prairie and open forest. Native Americans maintained this environment, good for hunting, by regular prairie burns. Trees are mainly oak, maple, and hickory, similar to the forests of the nearby Ozarks; common understory trees include eastern redbud, serviceberry, and flowering dogwood. Riparian areas are forested with mainly American sycamore.

Most of the residential areas of the city are planted with large native shade trees. The largest native forest area is found in Forest Park. In autumn, the changing color of the trees is notable. Most species here are typical of the eastern woodland, although numerous decorative non-native species are found. The most notable invasive species is Japanese honeysuckle, which officials are trying to manage and remove because of its damage to native trees.

Wildlife includes urbanized coyotes, white-tailed deer, eastern gray squirrel, cottontail rabbit, and the nocturnal Virginia opossum. Large bird species are abundant in parks and include Canada goose, mallard duck, shorebirds, and wading birds, like the great egret and great blue heron. Gulls are common along the Mississippi River; these species follow barge traffic.

Winter populations of bald eagles are along the Mississippi River around the Chain of Rocks Bridge. The city is on the Mississippi Flyway, used by migrating birds, and has a large variety of small bird species, common to the eastern U.S. The Eurasian tree sparrow, an introduced species, was limited in North America to the counties surrounding St. Louis but is expanding northward. The city has special sites for birdwatching of migratory species, including Tower Grove Park.

Common frog species include the American toad and species of chorus frogs called spring peepers, which are found in nearly every pond. Some years have outbreaks of cicadas or ladybugs. Mosquitoes, no-see-ums, and houseflies are common insect nuisances, especially in July and August; because of this, windows are almost always fitted with screens. Invasive populations of honeybees have declined in recent years. Numerous native species of pollinator insects have recovered to fill their ecological niche, and armadillos are throughout the St. Louis area.

== Demographics ==
Historical population
Census	Pop.	Note	%±
1810	1,600		—
1830	4,977		—
1840	16,469		230.9%
1850	77,860		372.8%
1860	160,773		106.5%
1870	310,864		93.4%
1880	350,518		12.8%
1890	451,770		28.9%
1900	575,238		27.3%
1910	687,029		19.4%
1920	772,897		12.5%
1930	821,960		6.3%
1940	816,048		−0.7%
1950	856,796		5.0%
1960	750,026		−12.5%
1970	622,236		−17.0%
1980	453,805		−27.1%
1990	396,685		−12.6%
2000	348,189		−12.2%
2010	319,294		−8.3%
2020	301,578		−5.5%
2025 (est.)	278,144	▼	−7.8%
U.S. Decennial Census; 2020 Census

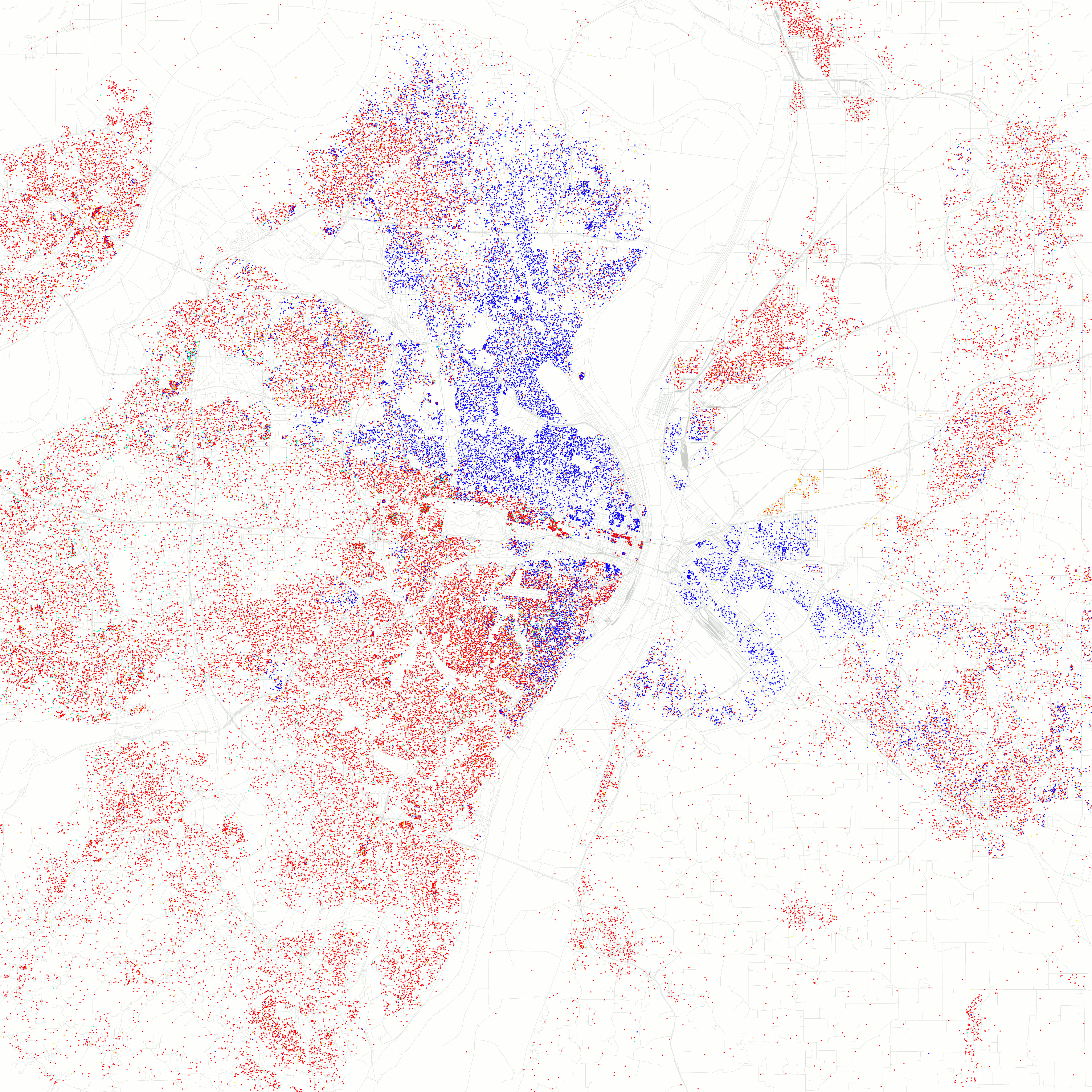
Map of racial distribution in St. Louis, 2010 U.S. Census. Each dot is 25 people: ⬤ White ⬤ Black ⬤ Asian ⬤ Hispanic ⬤ Other

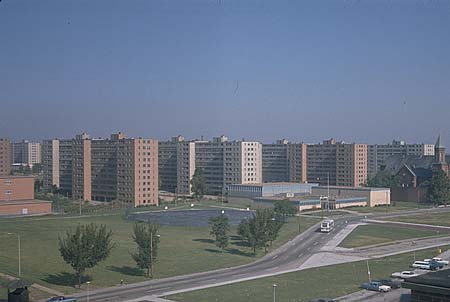
Pruitt–Igoe was a large housing project constructed in 1954, which became infamous for poverty, crime and segregation. It was demolished in 1972.

St. Louis grew slowly until the American Civil War, when industrialization and immigration sparked a boom. Mid-19th century immigrants included many Irish and Germans; later there were immigrants from southern and eastern Europe. In the early 20th century, African American and white migrants came from the South; the former as part of the Great Migration out of rural areas of the Deep South. Many came from Mississippi and Arkansas. Italians, Serbians, Lebanese, Syrians, and Greeks settled in St. Louis by the late 19th-Century.

After years of immigration, migration, and expansion, the city reached its peak population in 1950. That year, the Census Bureau reported St. Louis's population as 82% White and 17.9% African American. After World War II, St. Louis began losing population to the suburbs, first because of increased demand for new housing, unhappiness with city services, ease of commuting by highways, and later, white flight. As of the 2020 Census, St. Louis has lost 64.8% of its population since the 1950 United States census. During this period, the population of Greater St. Louis, which includes more than one county, has grown every year and continues to do so.

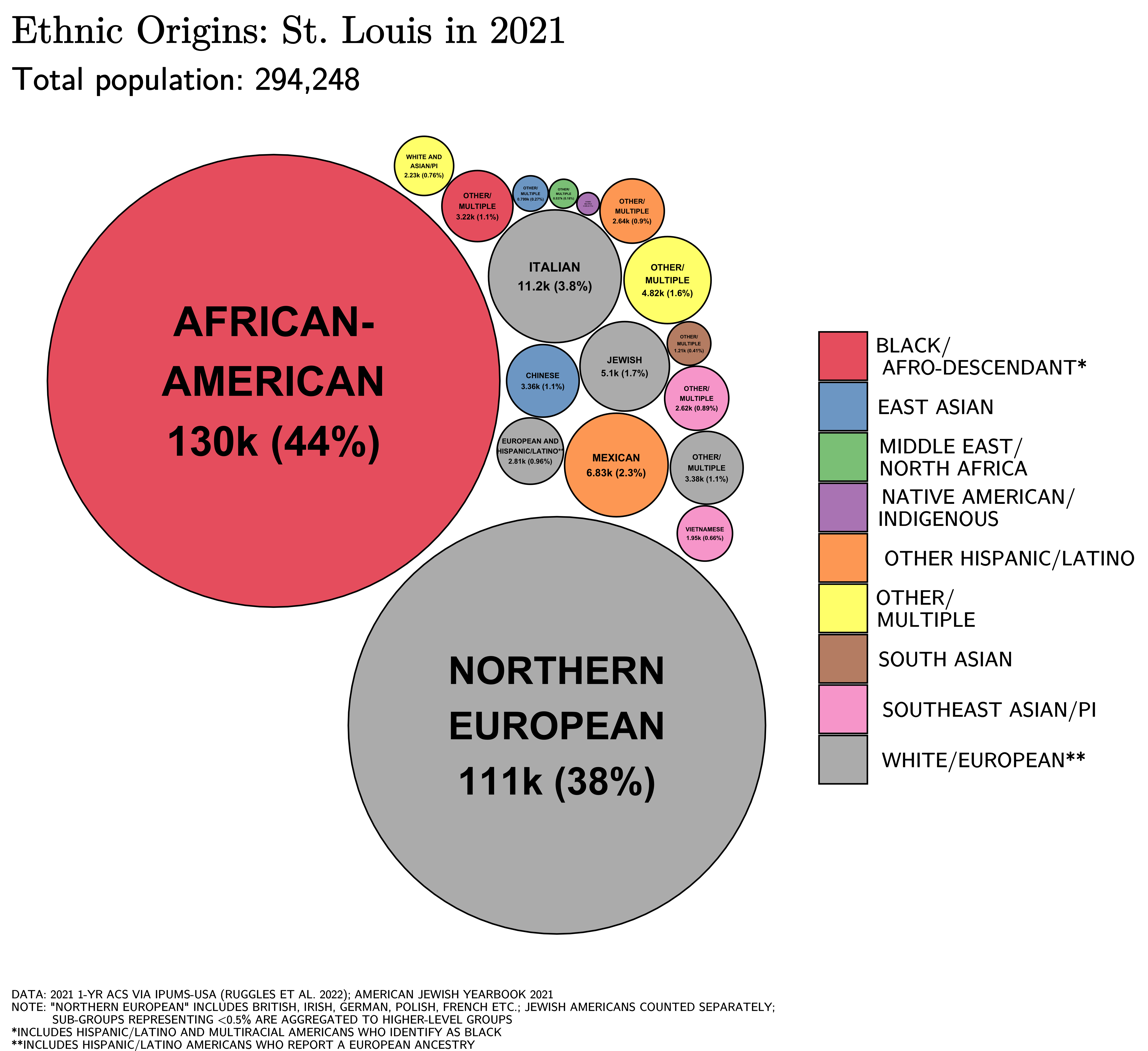
Ethnic origins in St. Louis

According to the 2010 United States census, St. Louis had 319,294 people living in 142,057 households, of which 67,488 households were families. The population density was 5,158.2 people per square mile (1,991.6 people/km^{2}). About 24% of the population was 19 or younger, 9% were 20 to 24, 31% were 25 to 44, 25% were 45 to 64, and 11% were 65 or older. The median age was about 34 years.

The African-American population is concentrated in the north side of the city (the area north of Delmar Boulevard is 94.0% black, compared with 35.0% in the central corridor and 26.0% in the south side of St. Louis). Among the Asian-American population in the city, the largest ethnic group is Vietnamese (0.9%), followed by Chinese (0.6%) and Indians (0.5%). The Vietnamese community has concentrated in the Dutchtown neighborhood of south St. Louis; Chinese are concentrated in the Central West End. People of Mexican descent are the largest Latino group, and make up 2.2% of St. Louis's population. They have the highest concentration in the Dutchtown, Benton Park West (Cherokee Street), and Gravois Park neighborhoods. People of Italian descent are concentrated in The Hill.

In 2010, St. Louis's per-capita rates of online charitable donations and volunteerism were among the highest among major U.S. cities.

As of 2010, 91.05% (270,934) of St. Louis city residents age 5 and older spoke English at home as a primary language, while 2.86% (8,516) spoke Spanish, 0.91% (2,713) Serbo-Croatian, 0.74% (2,200) Vietnamese, 0.50% (1,495) African languages, 0.50% (1,481) Chinese, and French was spoken as a main language by 0.45% (1,341) of the population over the age of five. In total, 8.95% (26,628) of St. Louis's population age 5 and older spoke a mother language other than English.

Historical racial composition	2020	2010	2000	1990	1970	1940
White	43.9%	43.9%	43.9%	50.9%	58.7%	86.6%
—Non-Hispanic	42.9%	42.2%	43.0%	50.2%	57.9%	86.4%
Black	43.0%	49.2%	51.2%	47.5%	40.9%	13.3%
Hispanic or Latino (of any race)	5.1%	3.5%	2.0%	1.3%	1.0%	0.2%
Asian	4.1%	2.9%	2.0%	0.9%	0.2%	(X)

=== 2020 census ===
St. Louis city, Missouri – Racial and ethnic composition Note: the US Census treats Hispanic/Latino as an ethnic category. This table excludes Latinos from the racial categories and assigns them to a separate category. Hispanics/Latinos may be of any race.
Race / Ethnicity (NH = Non-Hispanic)	Pop 1980	Pop 1990	Pop 2000	Pop 2010	Pop 2020	% 1980	% 1990	% 2000	% 2010	% 2020
White alone (NH)	239,420	198,956	149,329	134,702	129,368	52.84%	50.15%	42.89%	42.19%	42.90%
Black or African American alone (NH)	204,970	187,805	177,446	156,389	128,993	45.24%	47.34%	50.96%	48.98%	42.77%
Native American or Alaska Native alone (NH)	642	874	862	684	614	0.14%	0.22%	0.25%	0.21%	0.20%
Asian alone (NH)	1,696	3,616	6,820	9,233	12,205	0.37%	0.91%	1.96%	2.89%	4.05%
Native Hawaiian or Pacific Islander alone (NH)	x	x	83	62	88	x	x	0.02%	0.02%	0.03%
Other race alone (NH)	826	310	647	478	1,773	0.18%	0.08%	0.19%	0.15%	0.59%
Mixed race or Multiracial (NH)	x	x	5,980	6,616	13,132	x	x	1.72%	2.07%	4.35%
Hispanic or Latino (any race)	5,531	5,124	7,022	11,130	15,405	1.22%	1.29%	2.02%	3.49%	5.11%
Total	453,085	396,685	348,189	319,294	301,578	100.00%	100.00%	100.00%	100.00%	100.00%

=== Bosnian population ===
About fifteen families from Bosnia settled in St. Louis between 1960 and 1970. After the Bosnian War started in 1992, more Bosnian refugees began arriving and by 2000, tens of thousands of Bosnian refugees settled in St. Louis with the help of Catholic aid societies. Many of them were professionals and skilled workers who had to take any job opportunity to be able to support their families. Most Bosnian refugees are Muslim, ethnically Bosniaks (87%); they have settled primarily in south St. Louis and South County. Bosnian-Americans are well integrated into the city, developing many businesses and ethnic/cultural organizations.

An estimated 70,000 Bosnians live in the metro area, which is tied with Chicago for largest population of Bosnians in the United States and the largest Bosnian population outside their homeland. The highest concentration of Bosnians is in the neighborhood of Bevo Mill and in Affton, Mehlville, and Oakville of south St. Louis County.

Bosnian Muslim Romani people have also settled in St. Louis.

=== Crime ===
Since 2014 the city of St. Louis has had, as of April 2017, one of the highest murder rates, per capita, in the United States, with 188 homicides in 2015 (59.3 homicides per 100,000) and ranks No. 13 of the most dangerous cities in the world by homicide rate. Detroit, Flint, Memphis, Birmingham, and Baltimore have higher overall violent crime rates than St. Louis, when comparing other crimes such as rape, robbery, and aggravated assault. These crime rates are high relative to other American cities, but St. Louis index crime rates have declined almost every year since the peak in 1993 (16,648), to the 2014 level of 7,931 (which is the sum of violent crimes and property crimes) per 100,000. In 2015, the index crime rate reversed the 2005–2014 decline to a level of 8,204. Between 2005 and 2014, violent crime has declined by 20%, although rates of violent crime remains 6 times higher than the United States national average and property crime in the city remains 2 1/2 times the national average. St. Louis has a higher homicide rate than the rest of the U.S. for both whites and blacks and a higher proportion committed by males. As of October 2016, 7 of the homicide suspects were white, 95 black, 0 Hispanic, 0 Asian and 1 female out of the 102 suspects. In 2016, St. Louis was the most dangerous city in the United States with populations of 100,000 or more, ranking 1st in violent crime and 2nd in property crime. It was also ranked 6th of the most dangerous of all establishments in the United States, and East St. Louis, a suburb of the city itself, was ranked 1st. The St. Louis Police Department at the end of 2016 reported a total of 188 murders for the year, the same number of homicides that had occurred in the city in 2015. At the end of 2017, St. Louis had 205 murders but recorded only 159 inside St. Louis city limits. The new Chief of Police, John Hayden said two-thirds (67%) of all the murders and one-half of all the assaults are concentrated in a triangular area in the northern end of the city.

Another factor that influences comparison of murder rates between St. Louis and other cities is the city's unique municipal boundaries. While other municipalities have annexed suburbs, St. Louis has not annexed any suburban area since 1876. The city of St. Louis contains about approximately 10% of the metropolitan area's population, meaning a smaller portion of the metro population is included in citywide crime statistics.

== Economy ==
The gross domestic product of Greater St. Louis was $226.5 billion in 2023, up from $211.5 billion the previous year. Greater St. Louis had a GDP per capita of $68,574 in 2021, up 10% from the previous year. As of November, 2024, the education and health services industries employed the greatest number of people in the region, followed by the trade, transportation, and utilities industries and professional and business services.

=== Major companies and institutions ===
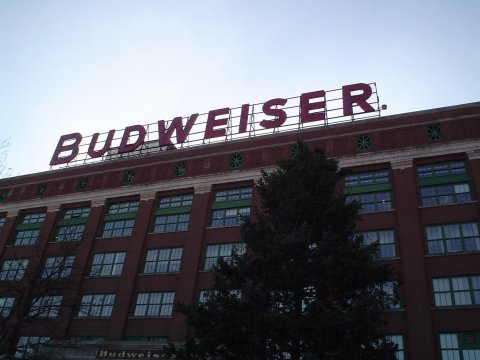
The Anheuser-Busch packaging plant is in St. Louis.

As of 2025, Greater St. Louis is home to seven Fortune 500 companies: Centene Corporation, Reinsurance Group of America, Emerson Electric, Edward Jones, Graybar Electric, Post Holdings, and Core & Main. An additional seven other area companies are listed on the Fortune 1000: Ameren Corporation, Olin Corporation, Stifel Financial, Peabody Energy, Advantage Solutions, Energizer Holdings, and Caleres.

Other major corporations headquartered in the region include Anheuser-Busch, Bunge Global, Wells Fargo Advisors, Enterprise Holdings, World Wide Technology, Arco Construction, McCarthy Holdings, Clayco Construction, Apex Oil, Alberici, and Schnuck Markets.

Several once-independent pillars of the local economy have been purchased by other corporations. Among them are Anheuser-Busch, purchased by Belgian-based InBev; Missouri Pacific Railroad, merged with the Omaha, Nebraska-based Union Pacific Railroad in 1982; McDonnell Douglas, whose operations are now part of Boeing Defense, Space & Security; Trans World Airlines, which was headquartered in the city for its last decade of existence prior to being acquired by American Airlines; and Ralston Purina, now a wholly owned subsidiary of Nestlé. The May Department Stores Company was purchased by Federated Department Stores, now Macy's, although it still has its regional headquarters in the area. Most of the assets of Furniture Brands International were sold to Heritage Home Group in 2013, which moved to North Carolina. German-based Bayer acquired Monsanto in 2018.

The Federal Reserve Bank of St. Louis is one of two federal reserve banks in Missouri.

St. Louis is a center of medicine and biotechnology. The Washington University School of Medicine is affiliated with Barnes-Jewish Hospital, the fifth largest hospital in the world. Both institutions operate the Alvin J. Siteman Cancer Center. The School of Medicine also is affiliated with St. Louis Children's Hospital, one of the country's top pediatric hospitals. Both hospitals are owned by BJC HealthCare. The McDonnell Genome Institute at Washington University played a major role in the Human Genome Project. Saint Louis University Medical School is affiliated with SSM Health's Cardinal Glennon Children's Hospital and Saint Louis University Hospital. It also has a cancer center, vaccine research center, geriatric center, and a bioethics institute. Several different organizations operate hospitals in the area, including BJC HealthCare, Mercy, SSM Health Care, and Tenet. Other health care and biotechnology institutions with operations in the region include Pfizer, the Donald Danforth Plant Science Center, Bayer, Sigma-Aldrich, Mallinckrodt, and Multidata Systems International.

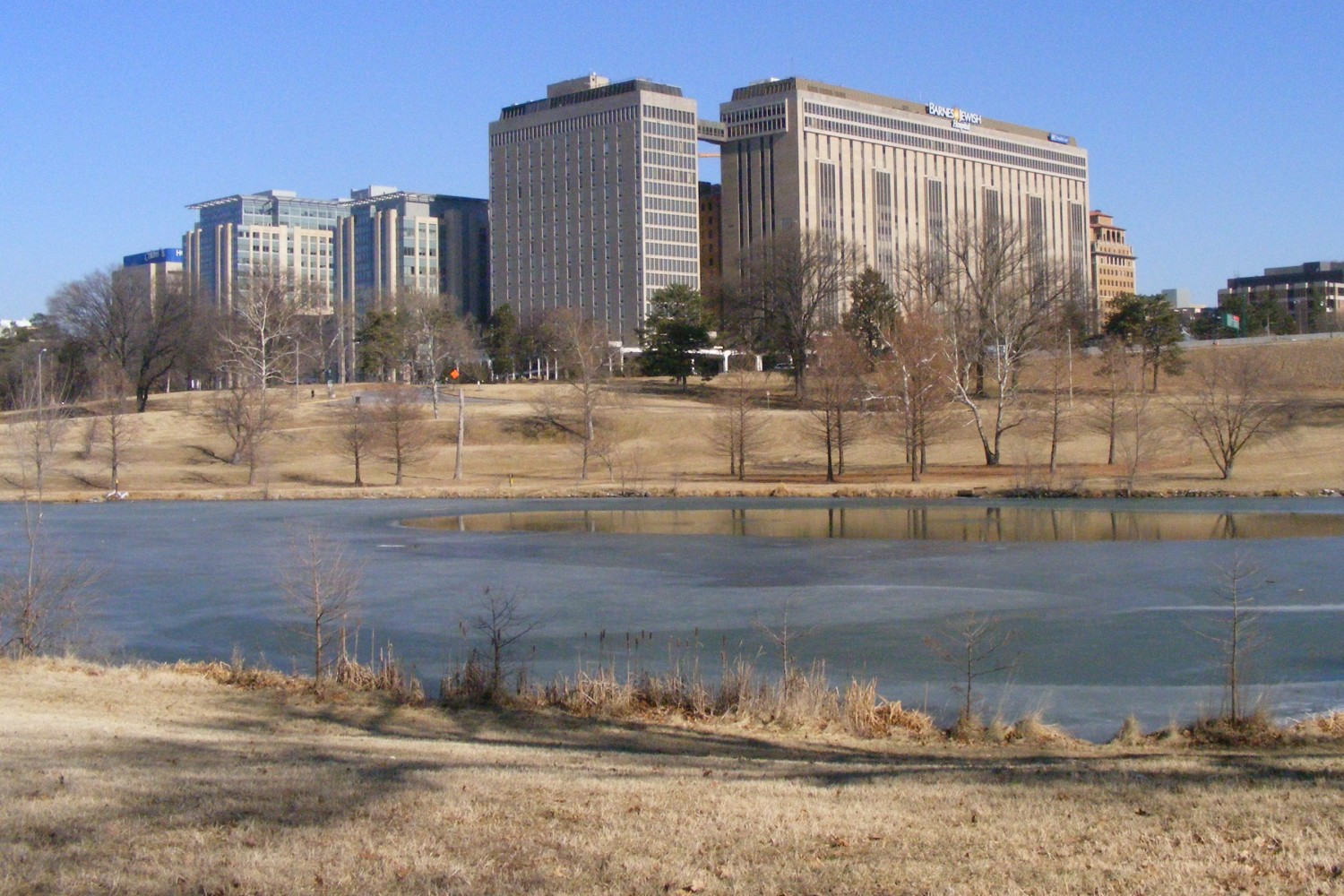
Barnes-Jewish Hospital is affiliated with the Washington University School of Medicine.

Cortex Innovation Community in Midtown is the region's largest innovation hub. Cortex is home to offices of Square, Microsoft, Aon, Boeing, and Centene. Cortex has generated 3,800 tech jobs in 14 years, and once built out, is projected to generate $2 billion in development and create 13,000 jobs for the region. The nonprofit Arch Grants is attracting new startups to the region, while the nonprofit LaunchCode trains future tech workers.

According to the St. Louis Business Journal, the top employers in Greater St. Louis as of March 29, 2023 are:

#	Employer	Local employees
1	BJC Health Care	33,797
2	Washington University	21,278
3	Walmart	17,000
4	Boeing Defense, Space & Security	16,681
5	SSM Health	15,631

According to St. Louis's 2022 Annual Comprehensive Financial Report, the top employers in the city only as of 2021 are:

#	Employer	Employees
1	Washington University	19,380
2	Barnes Jewish Hospital	18,920
3	Saint Louis University	9,152
4	City of St. Louis	7,033
5	Defense Finance and Accounting Service	6,051
6	Wells Fargo Advisors	5,801
7	U.S. Postal Service	4,960
8	St. Louis Board of Education	4,131
9	SSM SLUH	3,794
10	State of Missouri	3,259

== Arts and culture ==
Name	Description	Photo
Gateway Arch	At 630 feet (190 m), the Gateway Arch is the world's tallest arch and tallest human-made monument in the Western Hemisphere. Built as a monument to the westward expansion of the United States, it is the centerpiece of Gateway Arch National Park which was known as Jefferson National Expansion Memorial until 2018.	
St. Louis Art Museum	Built for the 1904 World's Fair, with a building designed by Cass Gilbert, the museum houses paintings, sculptures, and cultural objects. The museum is located in Forest Park, and admission is free.	
Missouri Botanical Garden	Founded in 1859, the Missouri Botanical Garden is one of the oldest botanical institutions in the United States and a National Historic Landmark. It spans 79 acres in the Shaw neighborhood, including a 14-acre (5.7-hectare) Japanese garden and the Climatron geodesic dome conservatory.	
Cathedral Basilica of St. Louis	Dedicated in 1914, it is the mother church of the Archdiocese of St. Louis and the seat of its archbishop. The church is known for its large mosaic installation (which is one of the largest in the Western Hemisphere with 41.5 million pieces), burial crypts, and its outdoor sculpture.	
City Hall	Located in Downtown West, City Hall was designed by Harvey Ellis in 1892 in the Renaissance Revival style. It is reminiscent of the Hôtel de Ville, Paris.	
Central Library	Completed in 1912, the Central Library building was designed by Cass Gilbert. It serves as the main location for the St. Louis Public Library.	
City Museum	City Museum is a play house museum, consisting largely of repurposed architectural and industrial objects, housed in the former International Shoe building in the Washington Avenue Loft District.	
Old Courthouse	Built in the 19th century, it served as a federal and state courthouse. The Scott v. Sandford case (resulting in the Dred Scott decision) was tried at the courthouse in 1846.	
St. Louis Science Center	Founded in 1963, it includes a science museum and a planetarium, and is situated in Forest Park. Admission is free. It is one of two science centers in the United States which offers free general admission.	
St. Louis Symphony	Founded in 1880, the St. Louis Symphony Orchestra is the second oldest symphony orchestra in the United States, preceded by the New York Philharmonic. Its principal concert venue is Powell Symphony Hall.	
Union Station	Built in 1888, it was the city's main passenger intercity train terminal. Once the world's largest and busiest train station, it was converted in the 1980s into a hotel, shopping center, and entertainment complex. Today, it also continues to serve local rail (MetroLink) transit passengers, with Amtrak service nearby. On December 25, 2019, the St. Louis Aquarium opened inside Union Station. The St. Louis Wheel, a 200 ft 42 gondola ferris wheel, is also located at Union Station.	
St. Louis Zoo	Built for the 1904 World's Fair, it is recognized as a leading zoo in animal management, research, conservation, and education. It is located in Forest Park, and admission is free.	

The same year as the 1904 World's Fair, the Strassberger Music Conservatory Building was constructed at 2300 Grand. Otto Wilhelmi was the architect. In 1911, the conservatory had over 1,100 students. The building is presently in the National Register of Historic Places. A well known graduate was Alfonso D'Artega.

With its French past and waves of Catholic immigrants in the 19th and 20th centuries, from Ireland, Germany and Italy, St. Louis is a major center of Roman Catholicism in the United States. St. Louis also boasts the largest Ethical Culture Society in the United States and is one of the most generous cities in the United States, ranking ninth in 2013. Several places of worship in the city are noteworthy, such as the Cathedral Basilica of St. Louis, home of the world's largest mosaic installation. Other churches include the Basilica of St. Louis, King of France, the oldest Roman Catholic cathedral west of the Mississippi River and the oldest church in St. Louis; the St. Louis Abbey, whose distinctive architectural style garnered multiple awards at the time of its completion in 1962; and St. Francis de Sales Oratory, a neo-Gothic church completed in 1908 in South St. Louis and the second largest church in the city.

The city is identified with music and the performing arts, especially blues, jazz, and ragtime. The St. Louis Symphony is the second oldest symphony orchestra in the United States. Until 2010, it was also home to KFUO-FM, one of the oldest classical music FM radio stations west of the Mississippi River. Opera Theatre of St. Louis has been called "one of America's best summer festivals" by the Washington Post. Former general director Timothy O'Leary was known for drawing the community into discussions of challenging operas. John Adams's "The Death of Klinghoffer", which touched off protests and controversy when performed by the Metropolitan Opera in 2014, had no such problems in St. Louis three years before, because the company fostered a citywide discussion, with interfaith dialogues addressing the tough issues of terrorism, religion and the nature of evil that the opera brings up. St. Louis's Jewish Community Relations Council gave O'Leary an award. Under O'Leary, the company—always known for innovative work—gave second chances to other major American operas, such as John Corigliano's "The Ghosts of Versailles", presented in 2009 in a smaller-scale version.

The Gateway Arch anchors downtown St. Louis and a historic center that includes: the Federal courthouse where the Dred Scott case was first argued, an expanded public library, major churches and businesses, and retail. An increasing downtown residential population has taken to adapted office buildings and other historic structures. In nearby University City is the Delmar Loop, ranked by the American Planning Association as a "great American street" for its variety of shops and restaurants, and the Tivoli Theater, all within walking distance.

Unique city and regional cuisine reflecting various immigrant groups include toasted ravioli, gooey butter cake, provel cheese, the slinger, the Gerber sandwich, and the St. Paul sandwich. Some St. Louis chefs have begun emphasizing use of local produce, meats and fish, and neighborhood farmers' markets have become more popular. Artisan bakeries, salumeria, and chocolatiers also operate in the city.

St. Louis-style pizza has thin crust, provel cheese, and is cut in small squares. Frozen-custard purveyor Ted Drewes offers its "Concrete": frozen custard blended with any combination of dozens of ingredients into a mixture so thick that a spoon inserted into the custard does not fall if the cup is inverted.

== Sports ==
St. Louis hosts the St. Louis Cardinals of Major League Baseball and the St. Louis Blues of the National Hockey League. In 2019, it became the eighth North American city to have won titles in all four major leagues (MLB, NBA, NFL, and NHL) when the Blues won the Stanley Cup championship. It has collegiate-level soccer teams and is one of three American cities to have hosted the Summer Olympic Games. A third major team, the St. Louis City SC of Major League Soccer, began play in 2023.

=== Professional sports ===
Pro teams in the St. Louis area include:

Club	Sport	First season	League	Venue
St. Louis Cardinals	Baseball	1882	Major League Baseball	Busch Stadium
St. Louis Blues	Ice hockey	1967	National Hockey League	Enterprise Center
St. Louis City SC	Soccer	2023	Major League Soccer	Energizer Park
St. Louis BattleHawks	American football	2020	United Football League	The Dome at America's Center
St. Louis City 2	Soccer	2022	MLS Next Pro	Energizer Park
Gateway Grizzlies	Baseball	2001	Frontier League	Grizzlies Ballpark
St. Louis Ambush	Indoor soccer	2013	Major Arena Soccer League	Family Arena

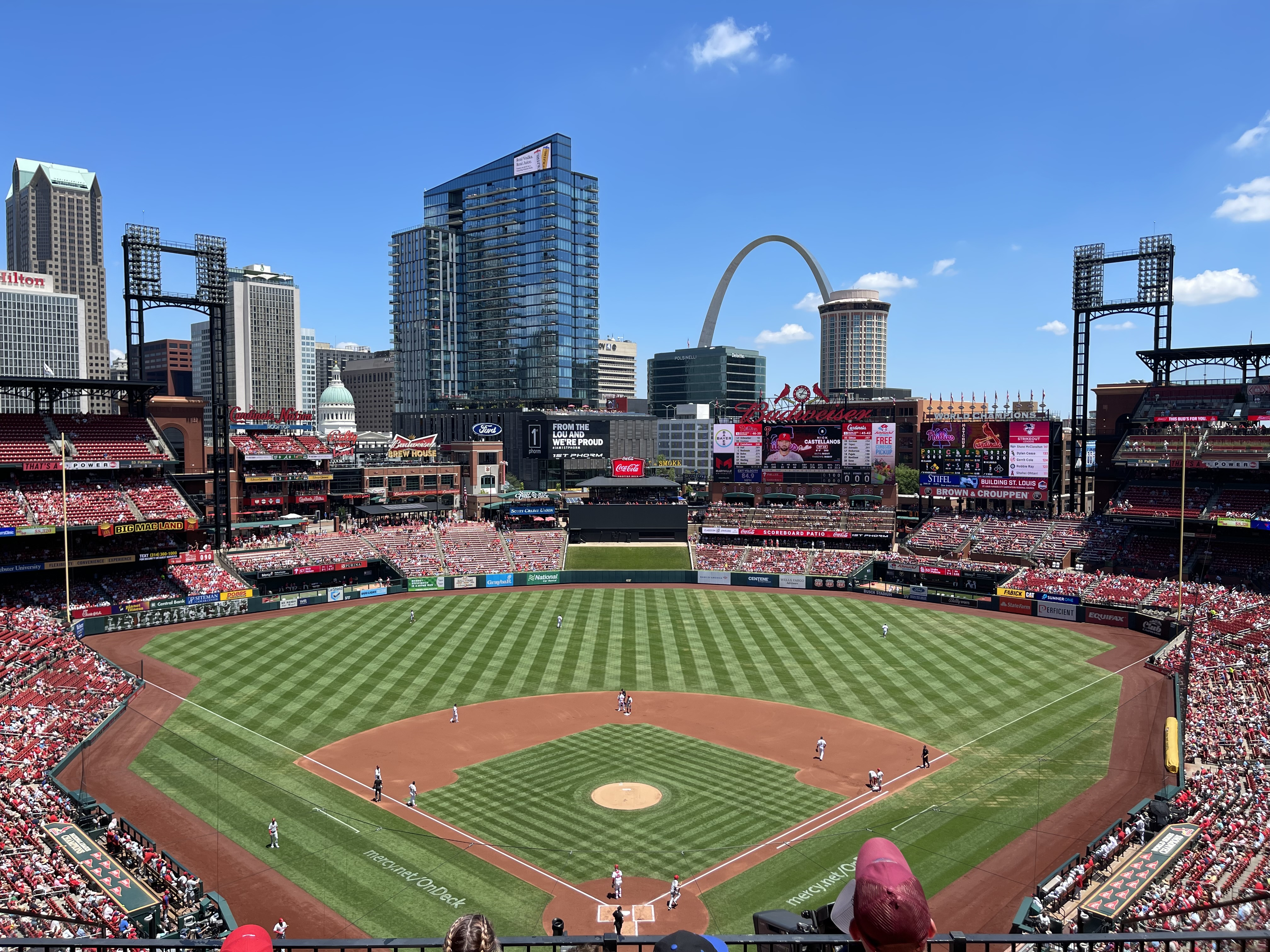
Busch Stadium

The St. Louis Cardinals are one of the most successful franchises in Major League Baseball. The Cardinals have won 19 National League (NL) titles (the most pennants for the league franchise in one city) and 11 World Series titles (second to the New York Yankees and the most by any NL franchise), recently in 2011. They play at Busch Stadium. Previously, the St. Louis Browns played in the American League (AL) from 1902 to 1953, before moving to Baltimore, Maryland to become the current incarnation of the Orioles. The 1944 World Series was an all-St. Louis World Series, matching up the St. Louis Cardinals and St. Louis Browns at Sportsman's Park, won by the Cardinals in six games. It was the third and final time that the teams shared a home field. St. Louis also was home to the St. Louis Stars, also known as the St. Louis Giants from 1906 to 1921, who played in Negro league baseball from 1920 to 1931 and won championships in 1928, 1930, and 1931, and the St. Louis Maroons who played in the Union Association in 1884 and in the National League from 1885 to 1889. In 1884, The St. Louis Maroons won the Union Association pennant and started the season with 20 straight wins, a feat that was not surpassed by any major professional sports team in the United States until the 2015–16 Golden State Warriors season when they started their NBA season with 24 straight wins.

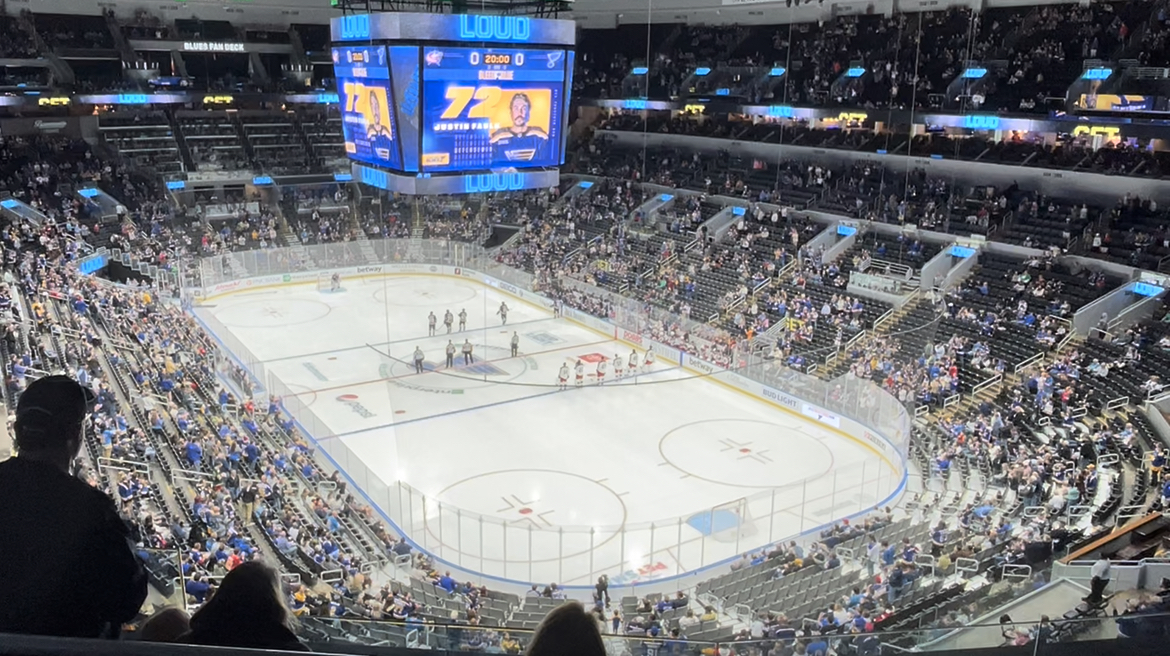
Enterprise Center

The St. Louis Blues of the National Hockey League (NHL) play at the Enterprise Center. They were one of the six teams added to the NHL in the 1967 expansion. The Blues went to the Stanley Cup finals in their first three years, but got swept every time. Although they were the first 1967 expansion team to make the Stanley Cup Finals, they were also the last of the 1967 expansion teams to win the Stanley Cup. They finally won their first Stanley Cup in 2019 after beating the Boston Bruins in the final. This championship made St. Louis the eighth city to win a championship in each of the four major U.S. sports. Prior to the Blues, the city was home to the St. Louis Eagles. The team played in the 1934–35 season.

St. Louis has been home to four National Football League (NFL) teams. The St. Louis All-Stars played in the city in 1923, the St. Louis Gunners in 1934, the St. Louis Cardinals from 1960 to 1987, and the St. Louis Rams from 1995 to 2015. The football Cardinals advanced to the NFL playoffs four times (1964, 1974, 1975 and 1982), never hosting in any appearance. They did, however, win the 1964 Playoff Bowl for third place against the Green Bay Packers by a score of 24–17. The Cardinals moved to Phoenix, Arizona, in 1988. The Rams played at the Edward Jones Dome from 1995 to 2015 and won Super Bowl XXXIV in 2000. They also went to Super Bowl XXXVI but lost to the New England Patriots. The Rams then returned to Los Angeles in 2016.

The St. Louis Hawks of the National Basketball Association (NBA) played at Kiel Auditorium from 1955 to 1968. They won the NBA championship in 1958 and played in three other NBA Finals: 1957, 1960, and 1961. In 1968 the Hawks moved to Atlanta. St. Louis was also the home to the St. Louis Bombers of the Basketball Association of America from 1946 to 1949 and the National Basketball Association from 1949 to 1950 and the Spirits of St. Louis of the American Basketball Association from 1974 to 1976 when the ABA and NBA merged.

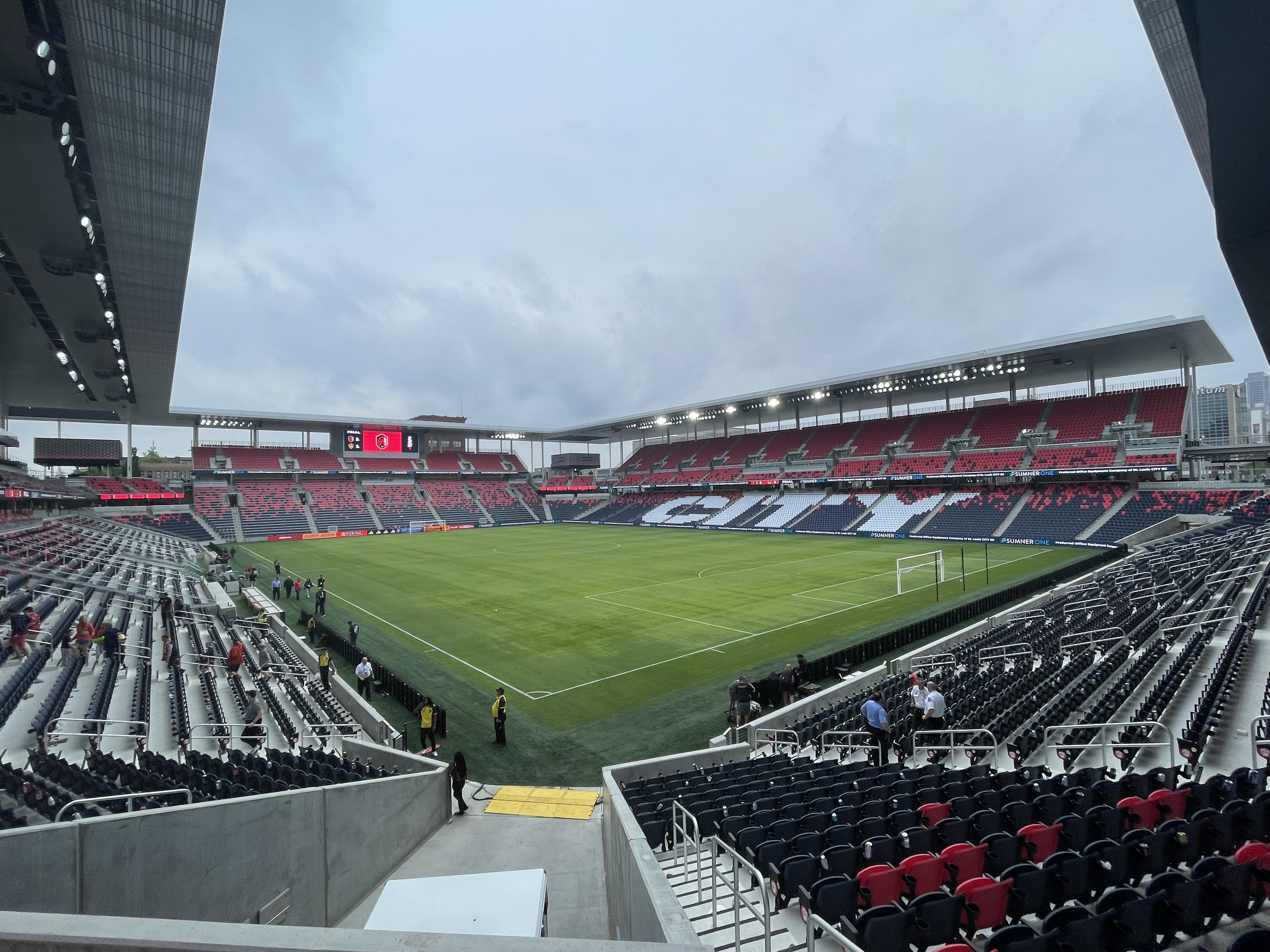
Energizer Park

Major League Soccer's St. Louis City SC began play in 2023 at Energizer Park. Their MLS Next Pro affiliate is St. Louis City 2, which began play in 2022 and also plays at Energizer Park. Formerly, USL Championship's Saint Louis FC played in the area from 2015 to 2020 at World Wide Technology Soccer Park.

The St. Louis BattleHawks of the XFL began play in 2020, using The Dome at America's Center as their home field. After a two-year hiatus of the league, the Battlehawks returned in 2023, when the XFL resumed play.

St. Louis hosts several minor league sports teams. The Gateway Grizzlies of the independent Frontier League play in the area in Sauget, IL. The St. Louis Trotters of the Independent Basketball Association play at Matthews-Dickey Boys and Girls Club. The St. Louis Ambush indoor soccer team plays in nearby St. Charles at the Family Arena as a part of the Major Arena Soccer League. The St. Louis Slam play in the Women's Football Alliance at Harlen C. Hunter Stadium.

The region hosts INDYCAR, NHRA drag racing, and NASCAR events at World Wide Technology Raceway at Gateway in Madison, Illinois. Thoroughbred flat racing events are hosted at Fairmount Park Racetrack near Collinsville, Illinois.

=== Chess ===
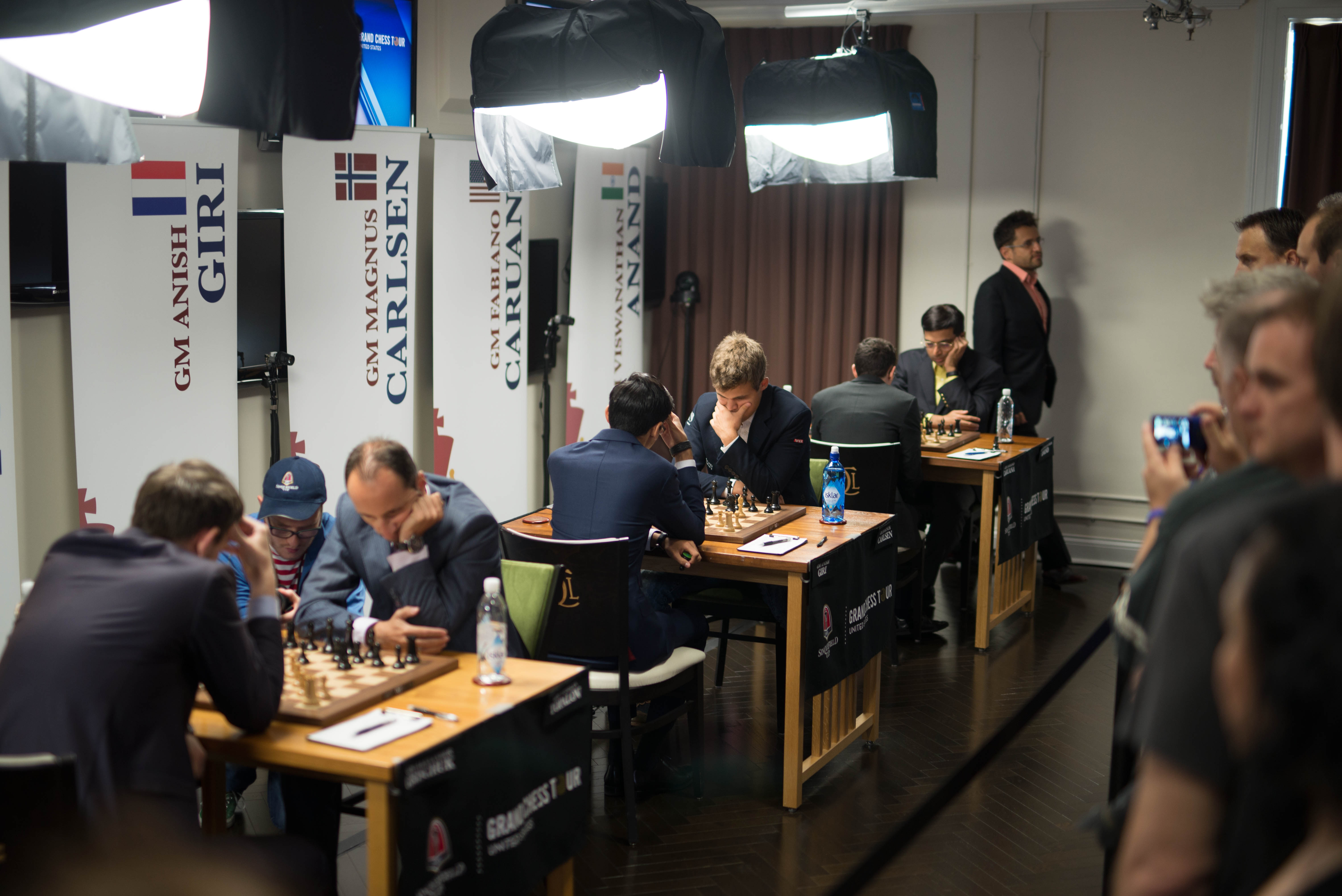
The Sinquefield Cup chess tournament is hosted annually in St. Louis.

St. Louis is home to the Saint Louis Chess Club where the U.S. Chess Championship is held. St. Louisan Rex Sinquefield founded the Chess Club and Scholastic Center of St. Louis (which was renamed as St. Louis Chess Club later) and moved the World Chess Hall of Fame to St. Louis in 2011. The Sinquefield Cup Tournament started at St. Louis in 2013. In 2014 the Sinquefield Cup was the highest-rated chess tournament of all time. Former U.S. Chess Champions Fabiano Caruana and Hikaru Nakamura have lived in St. Louis. Former women's chess champion Susan Polgar also resided in St. Louis in 2007 but lives in Florida in 2025.

=== College and amateur sports ===
St. Louis has hosted the Final Four of both the women's and men's college basketball NCAA Division I championship tournaments, and the men's Frozen Four collegiate ice hockey tournament. Saint Louis University has won 10 NCAA men's soccer championships, and the city has hosted the College Cup several times. In addition to collegiate soccer, many St. Louisans have played for the United States men's national soccer team, and 20 St. Louisans have been elected into the National Soccer Hall of Fame. St. Louis also is the origin of the sport of corkball, a type of baseball in which there is no base running.

Although the area does not have a National Basketball Association team, it hosted the St. Louis Phoenix, an American Basketball Association team, in the 2011-2012 season.

Club Atletico Saint Louis, a semi-professional soccer team, competes within the National Premier Soccer League and plays out of DeSmet high school stadium since 2023.

== Parks and recreation ==
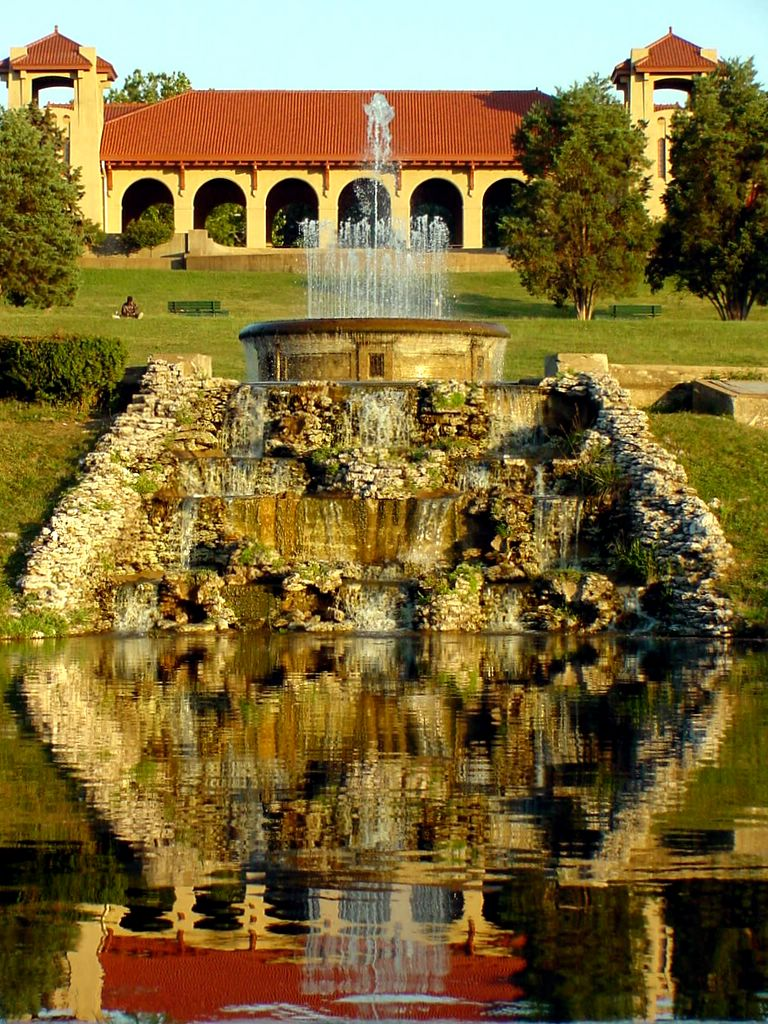
Forest Park features a variety of attractions, including the St. Louis Zoo, the St. Louis Art Museum, the Missouri History Museum, and the St. Louis Science Center.

The city operates more than 100 parks, with amenities that include sports facilities, playgrounds, concert areas, picnic areas, and lakes. Forest Park, located on the western edge of city, is the largest, occupying 1,400 acres of land, making it almost twice as large as Central Park in New York City. The park is home to five major institutions, including the St. Louis Art Museum, the St. Louis Zoo, the St. Louis Science Center, the Missouri History Museum, and the Muny amphitheatre. Another significant park in the city is Gateway Arch National Park, which was known as Jefferson National Expansion Memorial until 2018 and is located on the riverfront in downtown St. Louis. The centerpiece of the park is the 630-foot (192 m) tall Gateway Arch, a National Memorial designed by noted architect Eero Saarinen and completed on October 28, 1965. Also part of the historic park is the Old Courthouse, where the first two trials of Dred Scott v. Sandford were held in 1847 and 1850.

Other parks include the Missouri Botanical Garden, Tower Grove Park, Carondelet Park, and Citygarden. The Missouri Botanical Garden, a private garden and botanical research facility, is a National Historic Landmark and one of the oldest botanical gardens in the United States. The Garden features 79 acres of horticultural displays from around the world. This includes a Japanese strolling garden, Henry Shaw's original 1850 estate home and a geodesic dome called the Climatron. Immediately south of the Missouri Botanical Garden is Tower Grove Park, a gift to the city by Henry Shaw. Citygarden is an urban sculpture park located in downtown St. Louis, with art from Fernand Léger, Aristide Maillol, Julian Opie, Tom Otterness, Niki de Saint Phalle, and Mark di Suvero. The park is divided into three sections, each of which represent a different theme: river bluffs; flood plains; and urban gardens. Another downtown sculpture park is the Serra Sculpture Park, with the 1982 Richard Serra sculpture Twain.

== Government ==
Citywide office	Elected official
Mayor of St. Louis	Cara Spencer
President of the Board of Aldermen	Megan Green
City Comptroller	Donna Baringer
Recorder of Deeds	Michael Butler
Collector of Revenue	Gregory F.X. Daly
License Collector	Mavis T. Thompson
Treasurer	Adam Layne
Circuit Attorney	Gabe Gore
St. Louis City Interim Sheriff	John Hayden Jr.

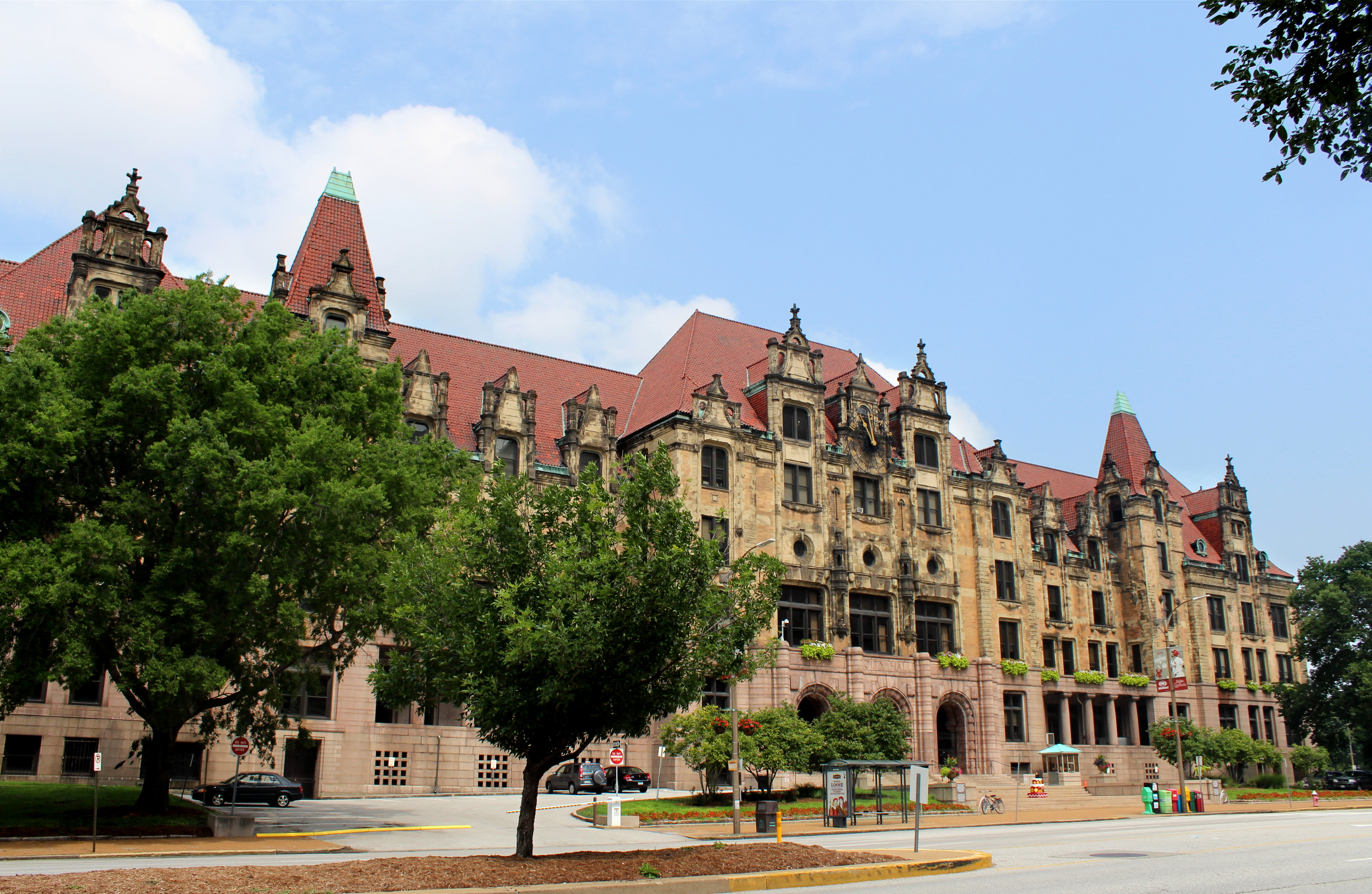
City Hall was completed in 1898, evoking features of the Hôtel de Ville, Paris.

St. Louis is one of the 41 independent cities in the U.S. that does not legally belong to any county. St. Louis has a strong mayor–council government with legislative authority and oversight vested in the Board of Aldermen and with executive authority in the mayor and six other elected officials. The mayor is the chief executive officer of the city and is responsible for appointing city department heads. The Board of Aldermen is made up of 14 members (one elected from each of the city's wards) plus a board president who is elected citywide. The 2014 fiscal year budget topped $1 billion for the first time, a 1.9% increase over the $985.2 million budget in 2013. 238,253 registered voters lived in the city in 2012, down from 239,247 in 2010, and 257,442 in 2008.

Municipal elections in St. Louis are held in odd-numbered years, with the primary elections in March and the general election in April. The mayor is elected in odd-numbered years following the United States presidential election using a top-two approval voting primary. The aldermen representing odd-numbered wards are up for election at the same time as the mayor. The president of the board of aldermen and the aldermen from even-numbered wards are elected in the off-years. The Democratic Party has dominated St. Louis city politics for decades. The city has not had a Republican mayor since 1949, and the last time a Republican was elected to another citywide office was in the 1970s. As of 2015, all 28 of the city's aldermen are Democrats.

Forty-eight individuals have held the office of mayor of St. Louis, four of whom—William Carr Lane, John Fletcher Darby, John Wimer, and John How—served non-consecutive terms. The most terms served by a mayor was by Lane, who served 8 full terms plus the unexpired term of Darby. The current mayor is Cara Spencer, who took office on April 15, 2025. She is the city's third consecutive female mayor. Her predecessor Tishaura Jones who took office April 20, 2021, was the first African-American woman to hold the post. Jones succeeded Lyda Krewson, the first female mayor of the city, who retired in 2021 after serving for four years. The longest-serving mayor was Francis Slay, who took office April 17, 2001, and left office April 18, 2017, a total of 16 years and six days over four terms in office. The shortest-serving mayor was Arthur Barret, who died 11 days after taking office.

Although St. Louis separated from St. Louis County in 1876, some mechanisms have been put in place for joint funding management and funding of regional assets. The St. Louis Zoo-Museum district collects property taxes from residents of both St. Louis City and County, and the funds are used to support cultural institutions including the St. Louis Zoo, St. Louis Art Museum and the Missouri Botanical Gardens. Similarly, the Metropolitan Sewer District provides sanitary and storm sewer service to the city and much of St. Louis County. The Bi-State Development Agency (now known as Metro) runs the region's MetroLink light rail system and bus system.

The City of St. Louis Sheriff's Office (STLSO or STLCSO) primarily provides security services for the courtrooms, and serves court documents and issues gun carry permits. In 2022, it gained the ability to make arrests and traffic stops. Formed in 1876, the Sheriff's Office has over 200 employees, of which 165 are deputies. Its budget was $11.97 million in 2025.

=== State and federal government ===
United States presidential election results for St. Louis
Year	Republican		Democratic		Third party(ies)	
Year	No.	%	No.	%	No.	%
2024	19,342	16.64%	94,458	81.24%	2,471	2.13%
2020	21,474	16.04%	110,089	82.24%	2,304	1.72%
2016	20,832	15.72%	104,235	78.68%	7,420	5.60%
2012	22,943	15.93%	118,780	82.45%	2,343	1.63%
2008	24,662	15.50%	132,925	83.55%	1,517	0.95%
2004	27,793	19.22%	116,133	80.29%	712	0.49%
2000	24,799	19.88%	96,557	77.40%	3,396	2.72%
1996	22,121	18.13%	91,233	74.78%	8,649	7.09%
1992	25,441	17.26%	102,356	69.44%	19,607	13.30%
1988	40,906	26.96%	110,076	72.55%	732	0.48%
1984	61,020	35.20%	112,318	64.80%	0	0.00%
1980	50,333	29.48%	113,697	66.59%	6,721	3.94%
1976	58,367	32.47%	118,703	66.03%	2,714	1.51%
1972	72,402	37.67%	119,817	62.33%	0	0.00%
1968	58,252	26.37%	143,010	64.74%	19,652	8.90%
1964	59,604	22.28%	207,958	77.72%	0	0.00%
1960	101,331	33.37%	202,319	66.63%	0	0.00%
1956	130,045	39.14%	202,210	60.86%	0	0.00%
1952	144,828	38.00%	235,893	61.89%	427	0.11%
1948	120,656	35.10%	220,654	64.19%	2,460	0.72%
1944	134,411	39.54%	204,687	60.22%	821	0.24%
1940	168,165	41.79%	233,338	57.98%	948	0.24%
1936	127,887	32.23%	260,063	65.54%	8,880	2.24%
1932	123,448	34.57%	226,338	63.38%	7,319	2.05%
1928	161,701	47.67%	176,428	52.01%	1,065	0.31%
1924	139,433	52.70%	95,888	36.24%	29,276	11.06%
1920	163,280	57.77%	106,047	37.52%	13,325	4.71%
1916	83,798	51.72%	74,059	45.71%	4,175	2.58%
1912	46,509	33.14%	58,845	41.93%	34,973	24.92%
1908	74,160	52.76%	60,917	43.34%	5,473	3.89%
1904	57,547	49.70%	51,858	44.79%	6,387	5.52%
1900	60,597	48.64%	59,931	48.11%	4,046	3.25%
1896	65,708	56.16%	50,091	42.81%	1,197	1.02%
1892	35,528	49.94%	34,669	48.73%	942	1.32%
1888	33,656	53.40%	27,401	43.48%	1,969	3.12%

St. Louis is split between 8 districts in the Missouri House of Representatives: the 76th, 77th, 78th, 79th, 80th, 81st, 82nd, and 84th districts. The 5th Missouri Senate district is entirely within the city, while the 4th is shared with St. Louis County.

At the federal level, St. Louis is the heart of Missouri's 1st congressional district, which also includes part of northern St. Louis County. A Republican has not represented a significant portion of St. Louis in the U.S. House since 1953. The city shifted from Republican voting to a Democratic stronghold at the presidential level since 1928. George H. W. Bush in 1988 was the most recent Republican to win even a quarter of the city's votes in a presidential election.

The United States Court of Appeals for the Eighth Circuit and the United States District Court for the Eastern District of Missouri are based in the Thomas F. Eagleton United States Courthouse in downtown St. Louis. St. Louis is also home to a Federal Reserve System branch, the Federal Reserve Bank of St. Louis. The National Geospatial-Intelligence Agency (NGA) also maintains major facilities in the St. Louis area.

== Education ==
=== Colleges and universities ===
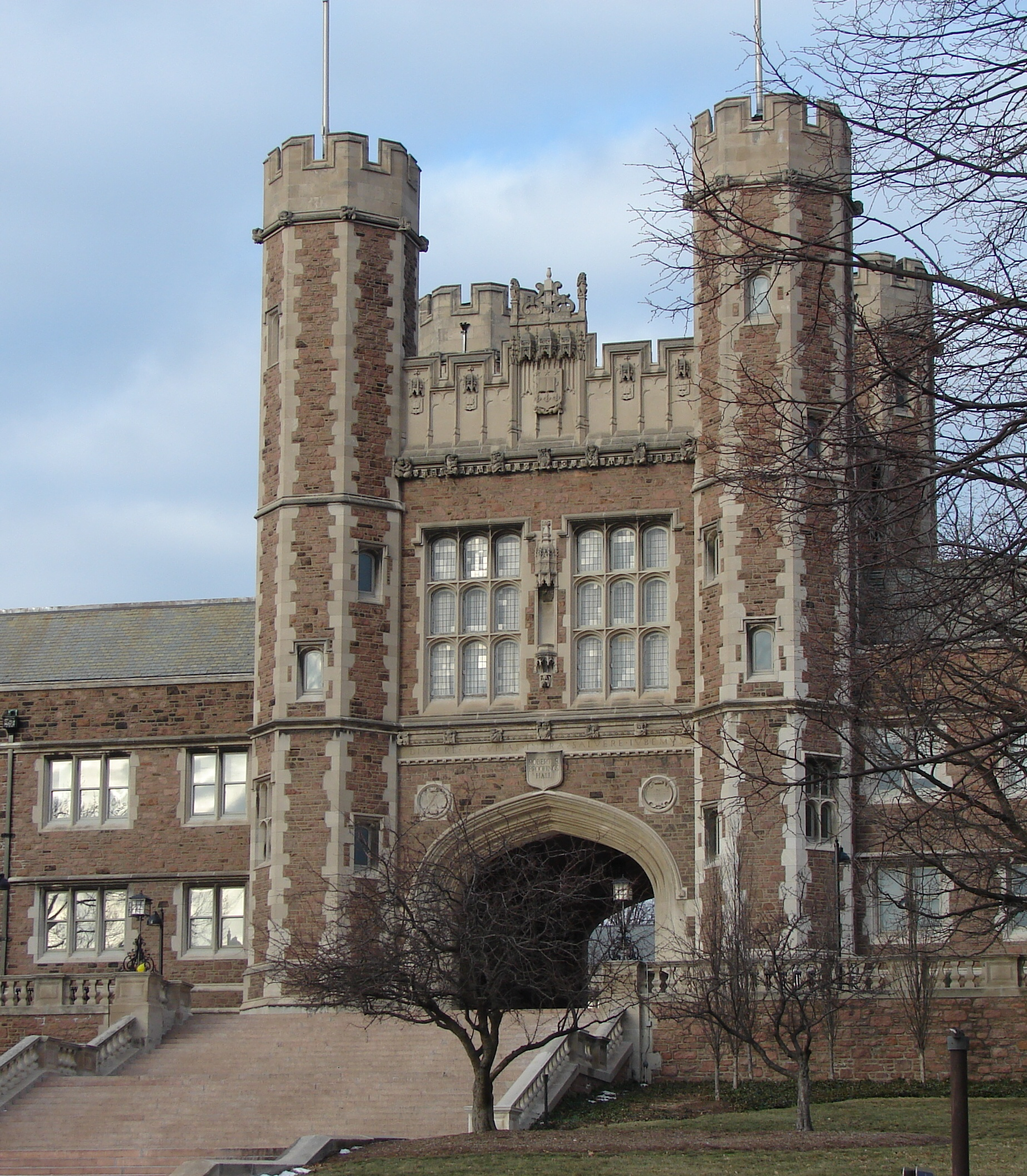
Brookings Hall is at Washington University in St. Louis.

The city is home to three national research universities, Washington University in St. Louis, Saint Louis University, and the University of Missouri-St. Louis, as classified under the Carnegie Classification of Institutions of Higher Education. Washington University School of Medicine in St. Louis has been ranked among the top 10 medical schools in the country by U.S. News & World Report for as long as the list has been published, and as high as second, in 2003 and 2004. U.S. News & World Report also ranks the undergraduate school and other graduate schools, such as the Washington University School of Law, in the top 20 in the nation.

St. Louis Metropolitan Region is home to St. Louis Community College. It is also home to several other four-year colleges & universities, including Harris–Stowe State University, a historically black public university, Webster University, Missouri Baptist University, University of Health Sciences & Pharmacy (the former Saint Louis College of Pharmacy), Southern Illinois University-Edwardsville (SIUE), and Lindenwood University.

In addition to Catholic theological institutions such as Kenrick-Glennon Seminary and Aquinas Institute of Theology sponsored by the Order of Preachers, St. Louis is home to three Protestant seminaries: Eden Theological Seminary of the United Church of Christ, Covenant Theological Seminary of the Presbyterian Church in America, and Concordia Seminary of the St. Louis-based Lutheran Church–Missouri Synod.

=== Primary and secondary schools ===
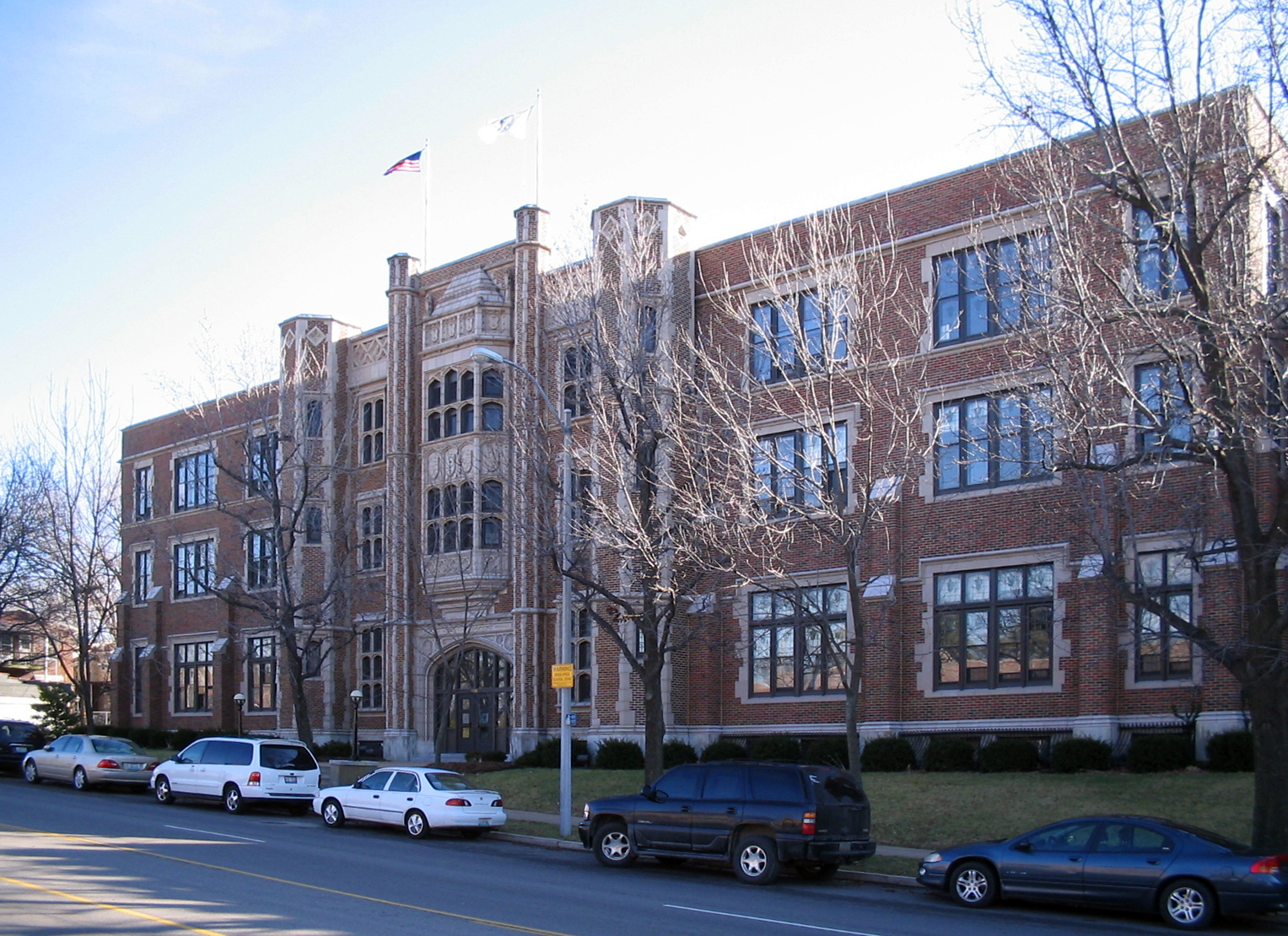
St. Louis University High School was founded in 1818. Its current building was built in 1924.

The St. Louis Public Schools (SLPS), which covers the entire city, operates more than 75 schools, attended by more than 25,000 students, including several magnet schools. Since 2017, SLPS operates under full accreditation from the state of Missouri, having previously lost its accreditation in 2007. The Board of Education of the city of St. Louis oversees the district. Since 2000, charter schools have operated in the city of St. Louis using authorization from Missouri state law. These schools are sponsored by local institutions or corporations and take in students from kindergarten through high school. In addition, several private schools exist in the city, and the Archdiocese of St. Louis operates dozens of parochial schools in the city, including parochial high schools. The city also has several private high schools, including secular, Montessori, Catholic and Lutheran schools. St. Louis University High School – a Jesuit preparatory high school founded in 1818 – is the oldest secondary educational institution in the U.S. west of the Mississippi River. The state-operated K-12 boarding school Missouri School for the Blind is in St. Louis.

== Media ==
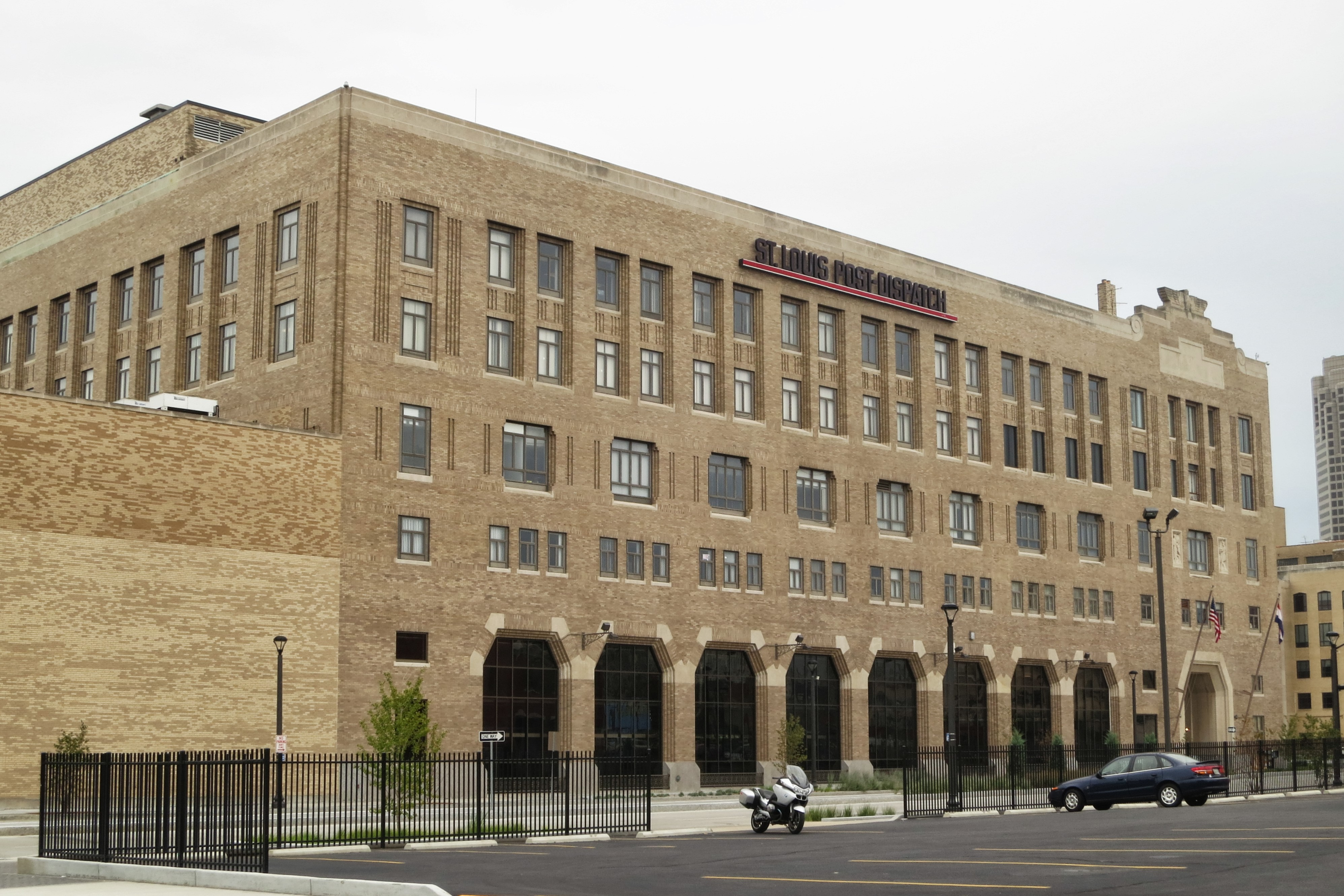
The former St. Louis Post-Dispatch building is in downtown St. Louis.

Greater St. Louis commands the 24th-largest media market in the United States. All of the major U.S. television networks have affiliates in St. Louis, including KTVI 2 (Fox), KMOV 4 (CBS, with ABC on channel 32.1), KSDK 5 (NBC), KETC 9 (PBS), KPLR-TV 11 (The CW), KNLC 24 (MeTV), KDNL 30 (Independent), WRBU 46 (Ion), and WPXS 51 Daystar Television Network. Among the area's most popular radio stations are KMOX (AM sports and talk, notable as the longtime flagship station for St. Louis Cardinals broadcasts), KLOU (FM oldies), WIL-FM (FM country), WARH (FM adult hits), and KSLZ (FM Top 40 mainstream). St. Louis also supports public radio's KWMU, an NPR affiliate. All-sports stations, such as KFNS 590 AM "The Fan" and WXOS "101.1 ESPN" are also popular. KSHE 95 FM "Real Rock Radio" has broadcast rock music since November 1967 - longer than any other radio station in the United States.

The St. Louis Post-Dispatch is the region's major newspaper. Others in the region include Ladue News, West Newsmagazine, the Webster-Kirkwood Times, and the Call Newspapers which all serve parts of St. Louis County. Three weeklies serve the African-American community: the St. Louis Argus, the St. Louis American, and the St. Louis Sentinel. St. Louis Magazine, a monthly magazine, covers topics such as local history, cuisine, and lifestyles, while the weekly St. Louis Business Journal provides coverage of regional business news. St. Louis was served by an online newspaper, the St. Louis Beacon, but that publication merged with KWMU in 2013. The primary alternative newspaper was the Riverfront Times before it was closed in 2024.

Many books and movies have been written about St. Louis. A few of the most influential and prominent films are Meet Me in St. Louis and American Flyers, and novels include The Killing Dance, Meet Me in St. Louis, The Runaway Soul, The Rose of Old St. Louis, and Circus of the Damned.

Because St. Louis was a prime location for immigrants to move to, much of the early social work depicting immigrant life was based on St. Louis, such as in the book The Immigrant in St. Louis.

== Transportation ==
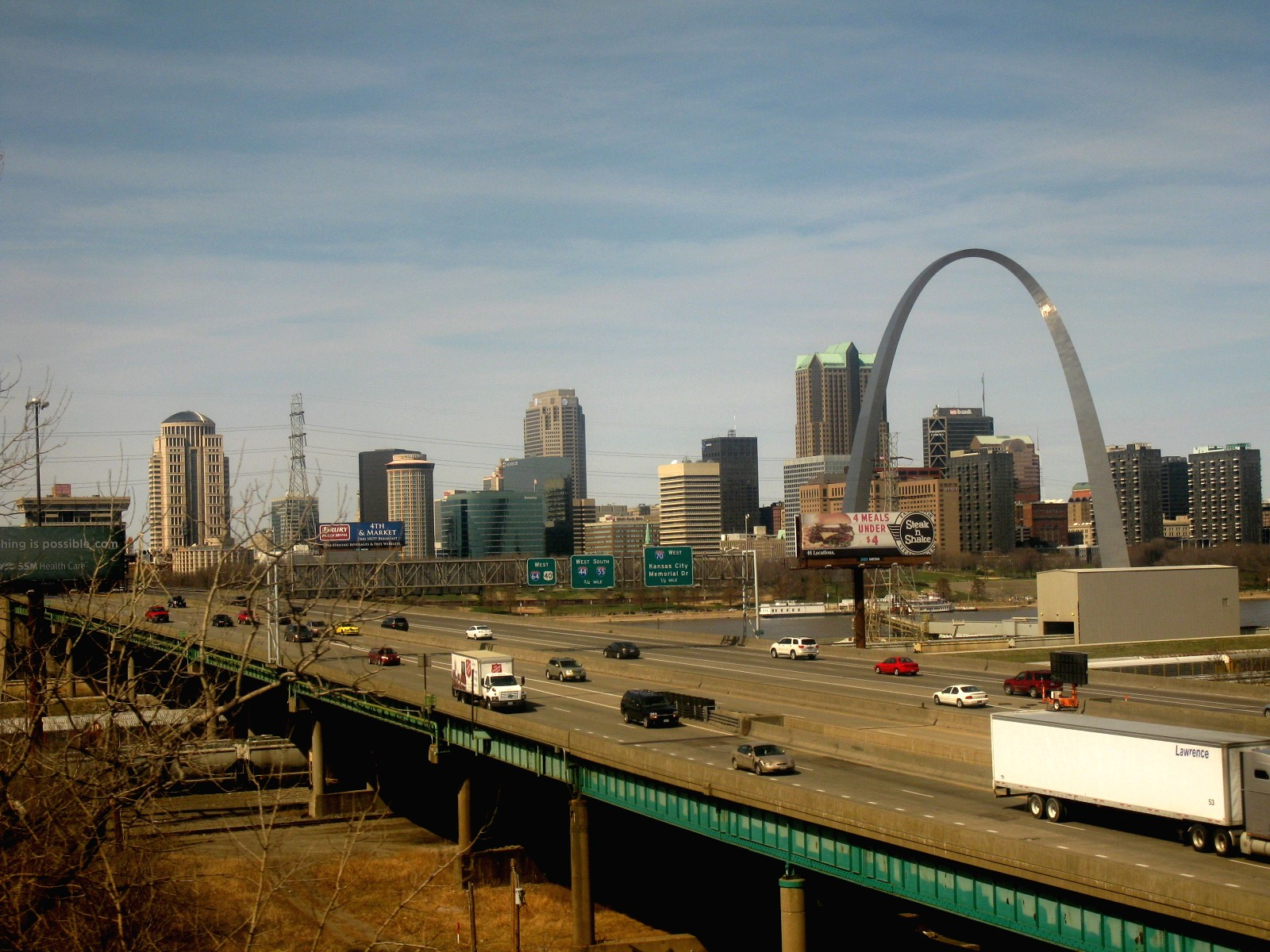
Interstate 64 crosses the Mississippi in downtown St. Louis.

Road, rail, ship, and air transportation modes connect the city with surrounding communities in Greater St. Louis, national transportation networks, and international locations. St. Louis also supports a public transportation network that includes bus and light rail service.

=== Roads and highways ===
Four interstate highways connect the city to a larger regional highway system. Interstate 70, an east–west highway, runs from the northwest corner of the city to downtown St. Louis. The north–south Interstate 55 enters the city at the south near the Carondelet neighborhood and runs toward the center of the city, and both Interstate 64 and Interstate 44 enter the city on the west, running parallel to the east. Two of the four interstates (Interstates 55 and 64) merge south of Gateway Arch National Park and leave the city on the Poplar Street Bridge into Illinois, while Interstate 44 terminates at Interstate 70 at its new interchange near N Broadway and Cass Ave. A small portion of the Interstate 270 outer belt freeway runs through the northern end of the city.

The 563-mile Avenue of the Saints links St. Louis with Saint Paul, Minnesota.

Major roadways include the north–south Memorial Drive, located on the western edge of Gateway Arch National Park and parallel to Interstate 70, the north–south streets of Grand Boulevard and Jefferson Avenue, both of which run the length of the city, and Gravois Road, which runs from the southeastern portion of the city to downtown and used to be signed as U.S. Route 66. An east-west roadway that connects the city with surrounding communities is Martin Luther King, Jr. Drive, which carries traffic from the western edge of the city to downtown.

=== Buses and taxis ===
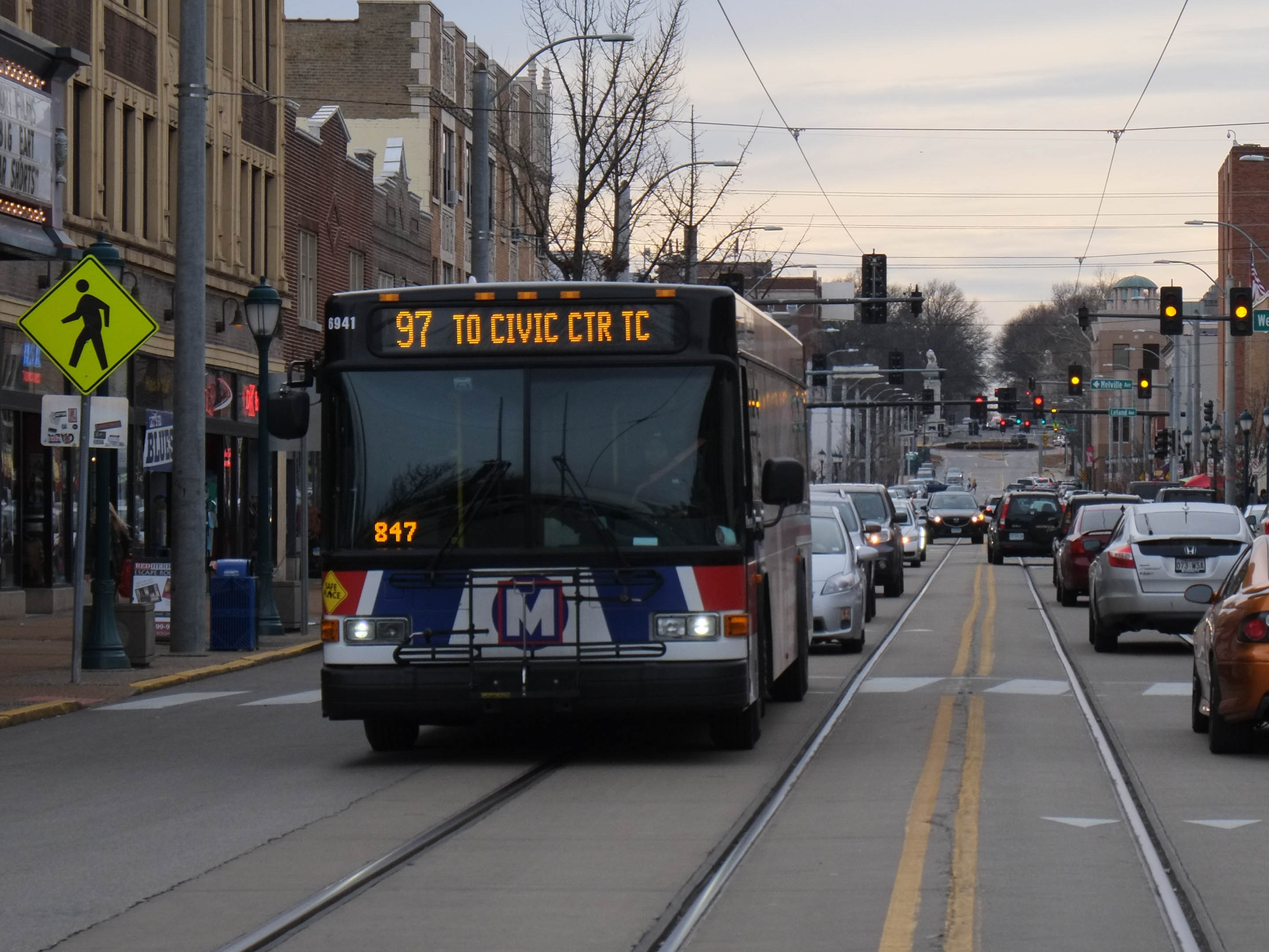
MetroBus in the Delmar Loop neighborhood bound for Civic Center station

Local bus service in the city of St. Louis is provided by the Bi-State Development Agency via MetroBus, with more than 75 routes connecting to MetroLink light rail transit and stops in the city and region. The city is also served by Madison County Transit, which connects downtown St. Louis to Madison County, Illinois. National bus service in the city is offered by Greyhound Lines, Burlington Trailways and Amtrak Thruway, with a station at the Gateway Transportation Center, and Megabus, with a stop at St. Louis Union Station.

Taxicab service in the city is provided by private companies regulated by the Metropolitan Taxicab Commission. Rates vary by vehicle type, size, passengers and distance, and by regulation all taxicab fares must be calculated using a taximeter and be payable in cash or credit card. Solicitation by a driver is prohibited, although a taxicab may be hailed on the street or at a stand.

=== Light rail and subways ===
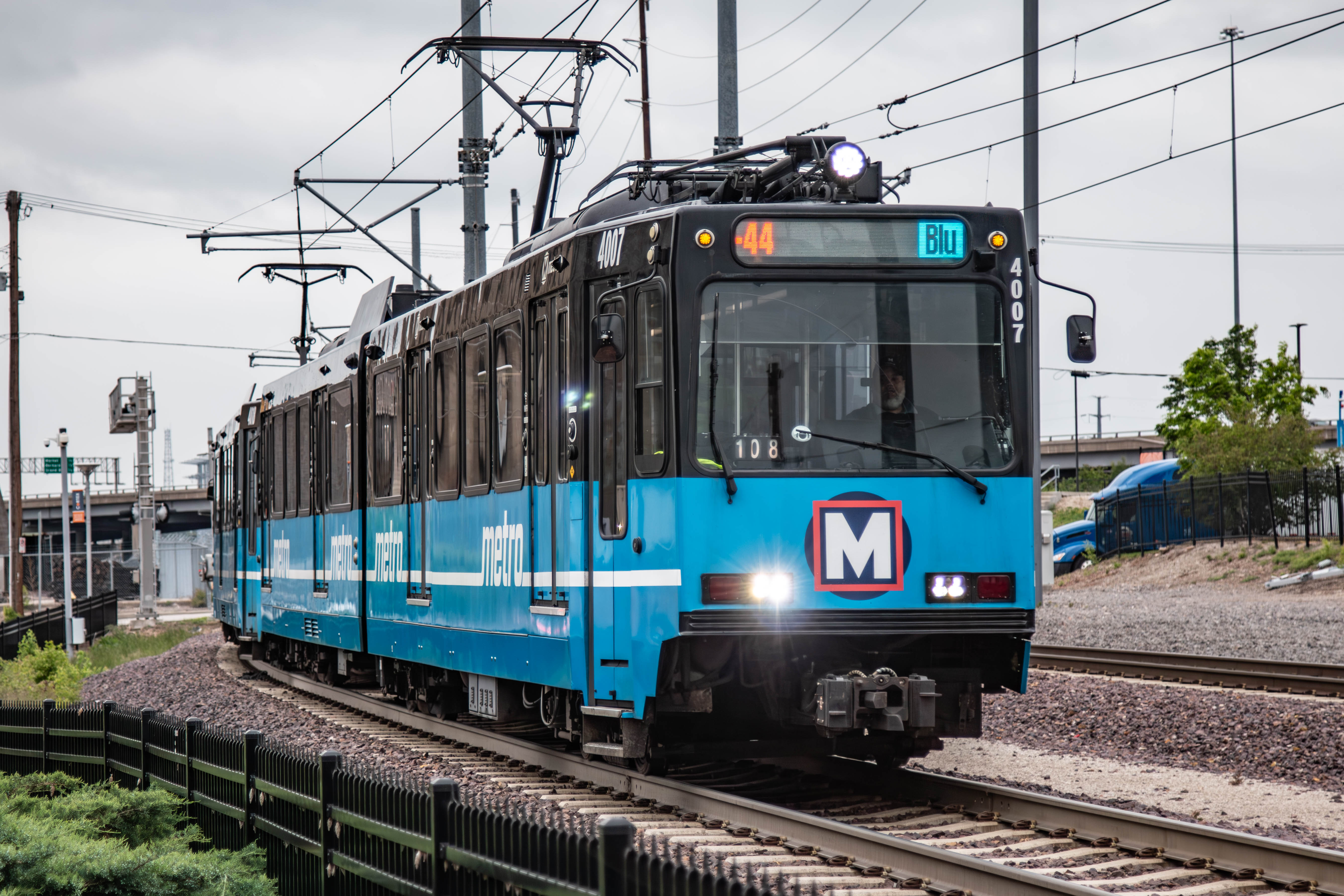
A St. Louis MetroLink Blue Line train leaves Cortex station

The St. Louis metropolitan area is served by MetroLink (known as Metro) and is the 11th-largest light rail system in the country with 46 mi (74 km) of double track light rail. The Red Line and The Blue Line both serve all the stations in the inner city, and branch to different destinations beyond in the suburban areas. Both lines enter the city north of Forest Park on the western edge of the city or on the Eads Bridge in downtown St. Louis to Illinois. All of the system track is in independent right of way, with both surface level and underground subway track in the city. All stations are independent entry, and all platforms are flush-level with trains. Rail service is provided by the Bi-State Development Agency (also known as Metro), which is funded by a sales taxes levied in the city and other counties in the region. The Gateway Multimodal Transportation Center acts as the hub station in the city of St. Louis, linking the city's light rail system, local bus system, passenger rail service, and national bus service. It is located just east of the historic grand St. Louis Union Station.

=== Heavy rail ===
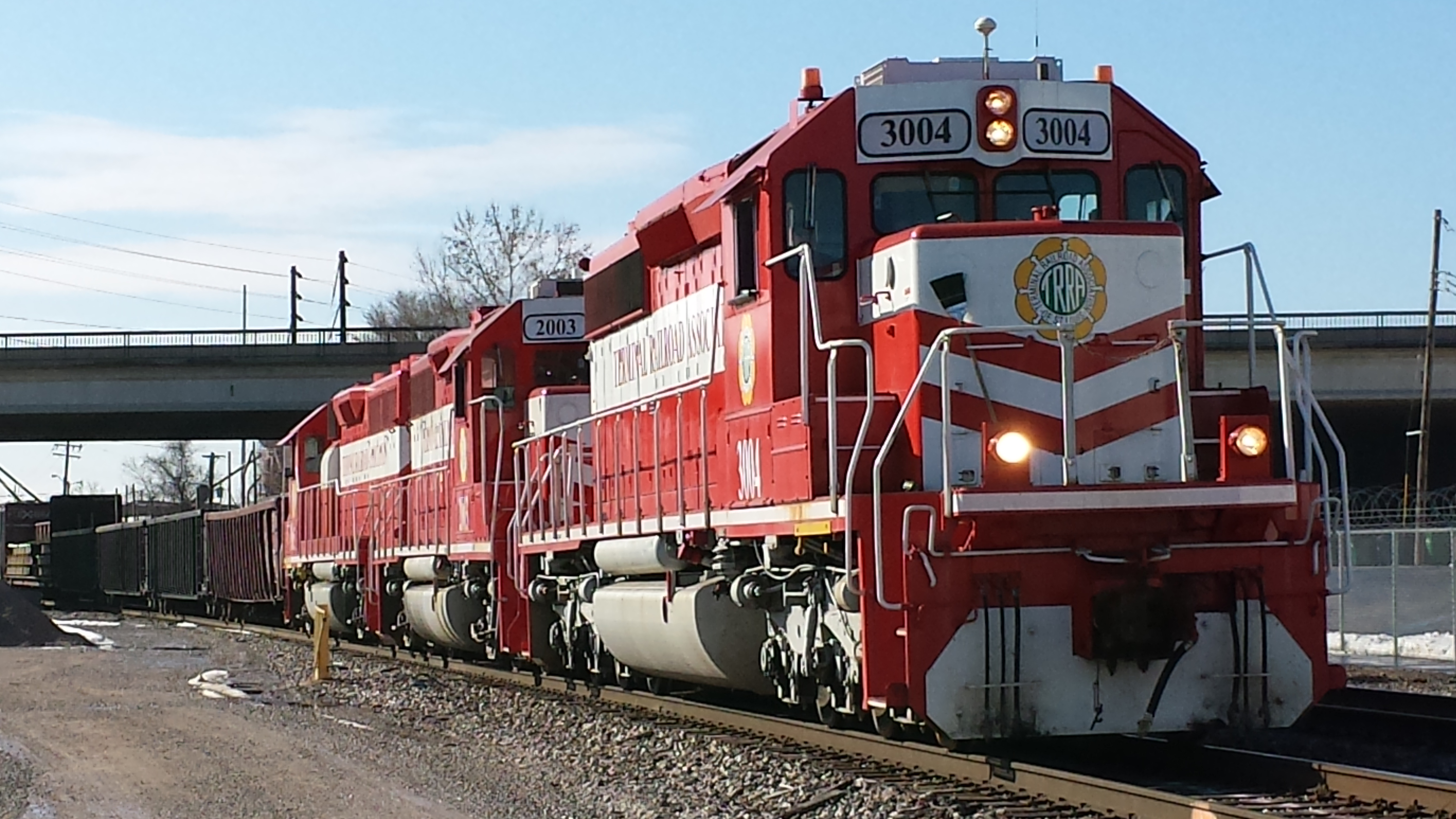
An eastbound Terminal Railroad Association of St. Louis freight train passes under the Hampton Avenue viaduct

Inter-city rail passenger train service in the city is provided by Amtrak at the Gateway Multimodal Transportation Center downtown. Amtrak trains terminating in the city include the Lincoln Service to Chicago and the Missouri River Runner to Kansas City, Missouri. St. Louis is an intermediate stop on the Texas Eagle route which provides long-distance passenger service between Chicago, San Antonio, and three days a week, to Los Angeles.

St. Louis is the nation's third-largest freight rail hub, moving Missouri exports such as fertilizer, gravel, crushed stone, prepared foodstuffs, fats, oils, nonmetallic mineral products, grain, alcohol, tobacco products, automobiles, and automobile parts. Freight rail service in St. Louis is provided on tracks owned by Union Pacific Railroad, Norfolk Southern Railway, Foster Townsend Rail Logistics – formerly Manufacturers Railway (St. Louis), Terminal Railroad Association of St. Louis, Affton Trucking, and the BNSF Railway.

The Terminal Railroad Association of St. Louis (reporting mark: TRRA) is a switching and terminal railroad jointly owned by all the major rail carriers in St. Louis. The company operates 30 diesel-electric locomotives to move railcars around the classification yards, deliver railcars to local industries, and ready trains for departure. The TRRA processes and dispatches a significant portion of railroad traffic moving through the city and owns and operates a network of rail bridges and tunnels including the MacArthur Bridge (St. Louis) and the Merchants Bridge. This infrastructure is also used by inter-city rail and long-distance passenger trains serving St. Louis.

=== Water ===
River transportation is available through the Port of St. Louis, which is 19.3 miles of riverbank on the Mississippi River that handles more than 32 million tons of freight annually. The Port is the second largest inland port by trip-ton miles, and the third largest by tonnage in the United States, with more than 100 docks for barges and 16 public terminals on the river. The Port Authority added two new small fire and rescue craft in 2012 and 2013.

=== Air ===
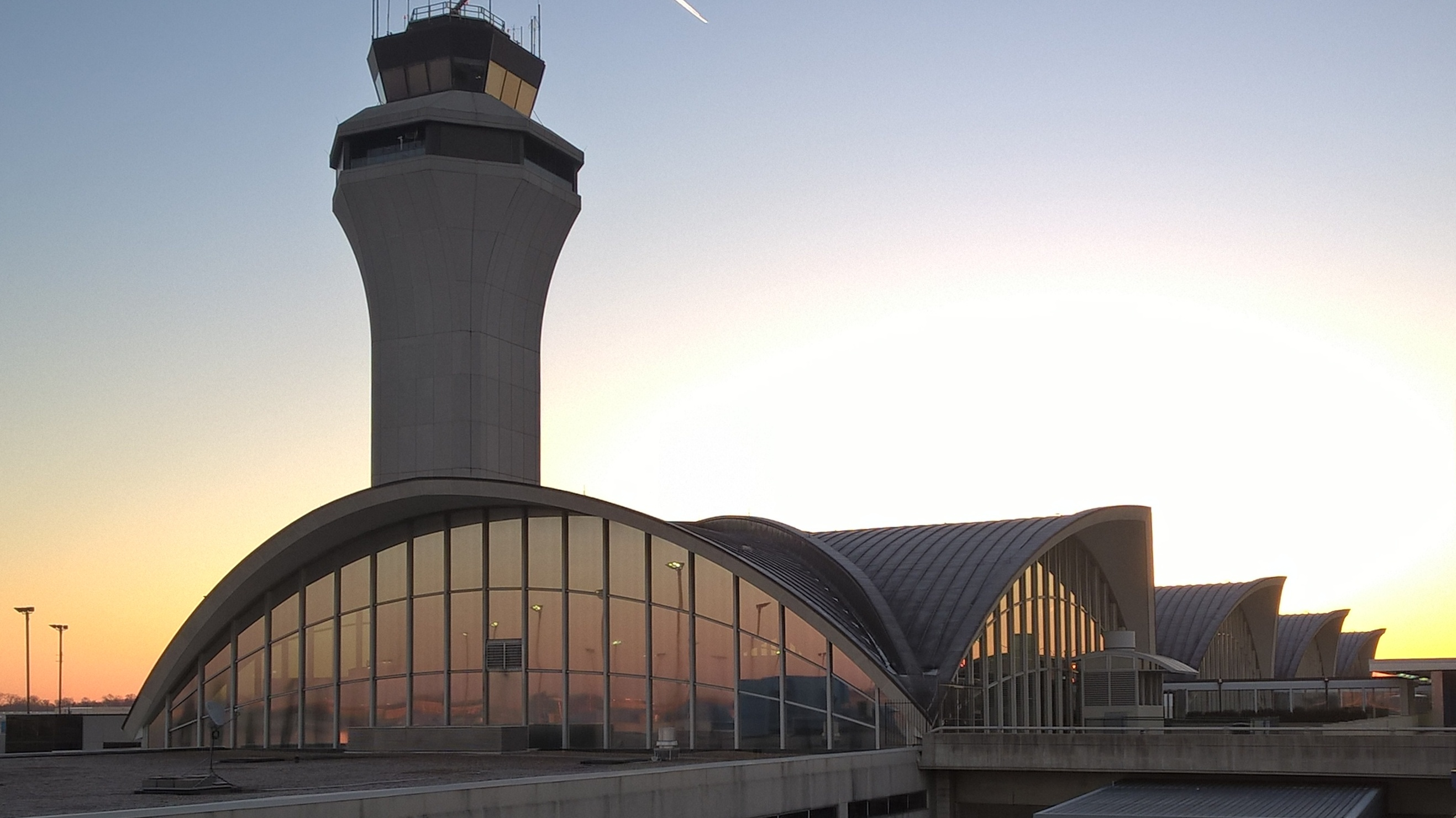
St. Louis Lambert International Airport control tower and main terminal

St. Louis is served by two passenger airports. St. Louis Lambert International Airport, owned and operated by the City of St. Louis, is 11 miles northwest of downtown along highway I-70 between I-170 and I-270 in St. Louis County. It is the largest and busiest airport in the state. In 2016, when the airport had more than 255 daily departures to about 90 domestic and international locations, it served more than 15 million passengers. The airport serves as a focus hub city for Southwest Airlines; it was once a hub for Trans World Airlines and a focus-city for American Airlines and AmericanConnection. The airport has two terminals with a total of five concourses. International flights and passengers use Terminal 2, whose lower level holds the Immigration and Customs gates. Passengers can move between the terminals on complimentary buses that run continuously, or via MetroLink for a fee. It was possible to walk between the terminals until Concourse D was closed in 2008.

MidAmerica St. Louis Airport is the secondary passenger airport serving the metropolitan area. Located 17 miles east of the city downtown core, the airport serves domestic passengers. Air cargo transportation is available at Lambert International and at other nearby regional airports, including MidAmerica St. Louis Airport, Spirit of St. Louis Airport, and St. Louis Downtown Airport.

== Sister cities ==
St. Louis has 16 sister cities:

- Bologna, Italy
- Bogor, Indonesia
- Brčko, Brčko District, Bosnia and Herzegovina
- Donegal, County Donegal, Ireland
- Galway, County Galway, Ireland
- Georgetown, Guyana
- Lyon, France
- Nanjing, China
- Rosario, Santa Fe, Argentina
- Saint-Louis, Senegal
- Samara, Russia
- San Luis Potosí, Mexico
- Stuttgart, Germany
- Suwa, Japan
- Szczecin, Poland
- Wuhan, China

== See also ==
- List of cities in Missouri
- 1939 St. Louis smog
- Caves of St. Louis
- Cuisine of St. Louis
- Delmar Divide
- Downtown St. Louis
  - Laclede's Landing, St. Louis
  - Downtown West, St. Louis
- Great Flood of 1993
- Heat wave of 2006 derecho series
- History of the Jews in St. Louis
- LaClede Town
- LGBT culture in St. Louis
- List of mayors of St. Louis
- List of neighborhoods of St. Louis
- List of tallest buildings in St. Louis
- National Register of Historic Places listings in St. Louis (city, A–L), Missouri
- National Register of Historic Places listings in St. Louis (city, M-Z), Missouri
- Roman Catholic Archdiocese of St. Louis
  - Cathedral Basilica of Saint Louis
- St. Louis Fire of 1849
- St. Louis in the Civil War
- List of Veiled Prophet Parade themes
- USS St. Louis, 7 ships
