= Mass media in St. Louis =

St. Louis is a major center of media in Missouri and the Midwestern United States. The following is a list of media outlets based in the city.

== Print ==
=== Magazines ===
- Feast, local dining, monthly. Ceased in 2025.

Gazelle Magazine

- Missouri Lawyers Weekly, regional legal news, weekly
- Sauce Magazine, local dining, monthly
- Yoga & Spa Magazine, fitness and lifestyle, quarterly
- St. Louis Magazine, general interest, monthly

=== Newspapers ===
The St. Louis Post-Dispatch is the city's primary newspaper, published daily.

Other papers published in Greater St. Louis include:

- The St. Louis American, local African-American news, weekly
- St. Louis Business Journal, business news, weekly
- The Riverfront Times, progressive alternative weekly
- St. Louis Jewish Light, Jewish religious news, weekly
- St. Louis Reporter, Christian religious news, owned by the Lutheran Church–Missouri Synod, monthly
- St. Louis Review, Christian religious news, owned by the Archdiocese of St. Louis, weekly

The following is a list of student newspapers at colleges in Greater St. Louis:

- The University News, St. Louis University, weekly
- The Current, University of Missouri–St. Louis, weekly
- Student Life, Washington University in St. Louis, published Monday, Wednesday, Friday
- Webster University Journal, Webster University, weekly
- Pawprint, Maryville University, weekly

St. Louis Community College has a student newspaper for each of its campuses:

- The Forum, Florissant Valley
- The Scene, Forest Park
- The Montage, Meramec

== Digital ==
Yutes Media House is a St. Louis-based digital media company focused on youth-driven content, including sports, music, culture, and community storytelling. The platform produces multimedia content such as video series, photo essays, podcasts, and articles highlighting local talent and events.

InsideSTL.com is a website covering local entertainment and culture.

== Radio ==
The St. Louis radio market includes the city itself, six counties in east-central Missouri, and four counties in southwestern Illinois. In its Fall 2013 ranking of radio markets by population, Arbitron ranked the St. Louis market 22nd in the United States.

The following is a list of radio stations which broadcast from and/or are licensed to the city of St. Louis:

=== AM ===
Frequency	Callsign	Format	City of License	Notes
550	KTRS	News/Talk	St. Louis, Missouri	Broadcasts from studios in Maryland Heights, Missouri
590	KFNS	Sports	St. Louis, Missouri	Broadcasts from studios in Kirkwood, Missouri
630	KYFI	Religious	St. Louis, Missouri	Bible Broadcasting Network
690	KSTL	Urban Gospel	St. Louis, Missouri	-
770	WEW	Brokered programming	St. Louis, Missouri	-
850	KFUO	Religious	St. Louis, Missouri	Lutheran Church-Missouri Synod
920	KWUL	Talk	St. Louis, Missouri	-
1010	KXEN	Religious	St. Louis, Missouri	-
1120	KMOX	News/Talk	St. Louis, Missouri	-
1380	KXFN	Religious	St. Louis, Missouri	-
1600	KATZ	Urban Gospel	St. Louis, Missouri	-

=== FM ===
Frequency	Callsign	Format	City of License	Notes
88.1	KLJT		St. Louis, Missouri	-
90.3	KWUR	Freeform	Clayton, Missouri	Washington University in St. Louis college radio; broadcasts from St. Louis
90.7	KWMU	Public	St. Louis, Missouri	University of Missouri–St. Louis; NPR
91.5	KSIV-FM	Religious	St. Louis, Missouri	Bott Radio Network
91.9	K220HT	Religious	St. Louis, Missouri	Translator of KAWZ, Twin Falls, Idaho
92.3	WIL-FM	Country	St. Louis, Missouri	Broadcasts from studios in Creve Coeur, Missouri
93.7	KSD	Country	St. Louis, Missouri	-
94.7	KSHE	Rock	Crestwood, Missouri	Broadcasts from studios in St. Louis
95.5	KXBS	Christian Rhythmic Contemporary	Bethalto, Illinois	
96.3	WFUN-FM	Urban Adult Contemporary	St. Louis, Missouri	-
97.1	KFTK-FM	News/Talk	Florissant, Missouri	Broadcasts from studios in St. Louis
98.1	KYKY	Hot Adult Contemporary	St. Louis, Missouri	-
100.3	KATZ-FM	Classic hip-hop	Bridgeton, Missouri	Broadcasts from studios in St. Louis
102.5	KEZK-FM	Adult Contemporary	St. Louis, Missouri	-
103.3	KLOU	Classic Hits	St. Louis, Missouri	-
104.1	KMOX-FM	News/Talk	Hazelwood, Missouri	-
104.9	KTLK-FM	Conservative talk	Columbia, Illinois	Broadcasts from studios in St. Louis
105.7	KPNT	Modern rock	Collinsville, Illinois	Broadcasts from studios in St. Louis
106.5	WARH	Adult Hits	Granite City, Illinois	-
107.7	KSLZ	Top 40	St. Louis, Missouri	-

== Television ==
The St. Louis television market includes the city itself, 14 counties in east-central Missouri, and 15 counties in southwestern Illinois. In its Fall 2018 ranking of television markets by population, Arbitron ranked the St. Louis market 21st in the United States.

The following is a list of television stations that broadcast from and/or are licensed to St. Louis.

Display Channel	Network	Callsign	City of License	Notes	
2.1	FOX	KTVI (Cable 2)	St. Louis, Missouri	Broadcasts from studios in Maryland Heights, Missouri	
2.2	Antenna TV	KTVI (Cable 2)	St. Louis, Missouri	Broadcasts from studios in Maryland Heights, Missouri	
2.3	Grit	KTVI (Cable 2)	St. Louis, Missouri	Broadcasts from studios in Maryland Heights, Missouri	
2.4	Shop LC	KTVI (Cable 2)	St. Louis, Missouri	Broadcasts from studios in Maryland Heights, Missouri	
4.1	CBS	KMOV (Cable 4)	St. Louis, Missouri	-	
4.2	First Alert Weather Now	KMOV (Cable 4)	St. Louis, Missouri	-	
4.3	Cozi TV	KMOV (Cable 4)	St. Louis, Missouri	-	
4.4	Ion Mystery	KMOV (Cable 4)	St. Louis, Missouri	-	
32.1	ABC	KMOV (Cable 4)	St. Louis, Missouri	-	
4.5	365BLK	KDTL-LD	St. Louis, Missouri	-	
32.2	Independent	KDTL-LD	St. Louis, Missouri	-	
32.3	Outlaw	KDTL-LD	St. Louis, Missouri	-	
5.1	NBC	KSDK (Cable 5)	St. Louis, Missouri	-	
5.2	Get	KSDK (Cable 5)	St. Louis, Missouri	-	
5.3	True Crime Network	KSDK (Cable 5)	St. Louis, Missouri	-	
5.4	Quest	KSDK (Cable 5)	St. Louis, Missouri	-	
5.5	Nosey	KSDK (Cable 5)	St. Louis, Missouri	-	
5.6	Confess	KSDK (Cable 5)	St. Louis, Missouri	-	
7.1	HSN	KPTN-LD	St. Louis, Missouri	-	
7.2	SonLife	KPTN-LD	St. Louis, Missouri	-	
7.3	Fubo Sports	KPTN-LD	St. Louis, Missouri	-	
7.4	Defy	KPTN-LD	St. Louis, Missouri	-	-
7.5	Infomercials	KPTN-LD	St. Louis, Missouri	-	
7.6	Salem News Channel	KPTN-LD	St. Louis, Missouri	-	
7.7	BeIN Sports Xtra	KPTN-LD	St. Louis, Missouri	-	
9.1	PBS	KETC	St. Louis, Missouri	-	
9.2	PBS Kids	KETC	St. Louis, Missouri	-	
9.3	World	KETC	St. Louis, Missouri	-	
9.4	Create	KETC	St. Louis, Missouri	-	
11.1	CW	KPLR-TV (Cable 11)	St. Louis, Missouri	Broadcasts from studios in Maryland Heights, Missouri	
11.2	Court TV	KPLR-TV (Cable 11)	St. Louis, Missouri	Broadcasts from studios in Maryland Heights, Missouri	
11.3	Comet	KPLR-TV (Cable 11)	St. Louis, Missouri	Broadcasts from studios in Maryland Heights, Missouri	
11.4	Rewind TV	KPLR-TV (Cable 11)	St. Louis, Missouri	Broadcasts from studios in Maryland Heights, Missouri	
15.1	HSN	K15KP-D	St. Louis, Missouri		
15.2	QVC	K15KP-D	St. Louis, Missouri		
15.3	HSN2	K15KP-D	St. Louis, Missouri		
15.4	QVC2	K15KP-D	St. Louis, Missouri		
15.5	QVC3	K15KP-D	St. Louis, Missouri		
16.1	Daystar	KDTL-LD	St. Louis, Missouri	-	
24.1	MeTV	KNLC	St. Louis, Missouri	-	
24.2	MeTV Toons	KNLC	St. Louis, Missouri	-	
24.3	Heroes and Icons	KNLC	St. Louis, Missouri	-	
24.4	Movies!	KNLC	St. Louis, Missouri	-	
24.5	Catchy Comedy	KNLC	St. Louis, Missouri	-	
24.6	Start TV	KNLC	St. Louis, Missouri	-	
24.7	MeTV+	KNLC	St. Louis, Missouri	-	
24.8	Story Television	KNLC	St. Louis, Missouri	-	
24.9	Dabl	KNLC	St. Louis, Missouri	-	
25.1	Visión Latina	K25NG-D	St. Louis, Missouri	-	
25.2	Three Angels Broadcasting Network	K25NG-D	St. Louis, Missouri	-	
25.3	New Tang Dynasty Television	K25NG-D	St. Louis, Missouri	-	
25.4	Defy	K25NG-D	St. Louis, Missouri	-	
25.5	NBC True CRMZ	K25NG-D	St. Louis, Missouri	-	
25.6	Oxygen	K25NG-D	St. Louis, Missouri	-	
25.7	Telemundo	K25NG-D	St. Louis, Missouri	-	
25.8	Infomercials	K25NG-D	St. Louis, Missouri	-	
30.1	Independent	KDNL-TV (Cable 12)	St. Louis, Missouri	-	
30.2	TBD	KDNL-TV (Cable 12)	St. Louis, Missouri	-	
30.3	Charge!	KDNL-TV (Cable 12)	St. Louis, Missouri	-	
30.4	The Nest	KDNL-TV (Cable 12)	St. Louis, Missouri	-	
33.1	Buzzr	KBGU-LD	St. Louis, Missouri	-	
33.2	Defy	KBGU-LD	St. Louis, Missouri	-	
33.3	Shop LC	KBGU-LD	St. Louis, Missouri	-	
33.4	MtrSpt1	KBGU-LD	St. Louis, Missouri	-	
33.5	Infomercials	KBGU-LD	St. Louis, Missouri	-	
33.6	ShopHQ	KBGU-LD	St. Louis, Missouri	-	
33.7	Jewelry TV	KBGU-LD	St. Louis, Missouri	-	
38.1	HSN	K38HD-D	St. Louis, Missouri		
45.1	Telemundo	WODK-LD			
45.2	Infomercials	WODK-LD			
45.3	[blank]	WODK-LD			
45.4	Infomercials	WODK-LD			
45.5	Defy	WODK-LD			
45.6	Fubo Sports	WODK-LD			
45.7	[blank]	WODK-LD			
46.1	Ion	WRBU	East St. Louis, Illinois	Broadcasts from studios in St. Louis	
46.2	Bounce TV	WRBU	East St. Louis, Illinois	Broadcasts from studios in St. Louis	
46.3	Laff	WRBU	East St. Louis, Illinois	Broadcasts from studios in St. Louis	
46.4	Ion Plus	WRBU	East St. Louis, Illinois	Broadcasts from studios in St. Louis	
46.5	Scripps News	WRBU	East St. Louis, Illinois	Broadcasts from studios in St. Louis	
46.6	Jewelry TV	WRBU	East St. Louis, Illinois	Broadcasts from studios in St. Louis	
46.7	QVC	WRBU	East St. Louis, Illinois	Broadcasts from studios in St. Louis	
46.8	HSN	WRBU	East St. Louis, Illinois	Broadcasts from studios in St. Louis	
51.1	Daystar	KUMO-LD	St. Louis, Missouri	Translator of WPXS, Mount Vernon, Illinois	
51.2	Daystar Español	KUMO-LD	St. Louis, Missouri	Translator of WPXS, Mount Vernon, Illinois	
51.3	Retro TV	KUMO-LD	St. Louis, Missouri	Translator of WPXS, Mount Vernon, Illinois	
