= KDNL-TV =

Television station in St. Louis

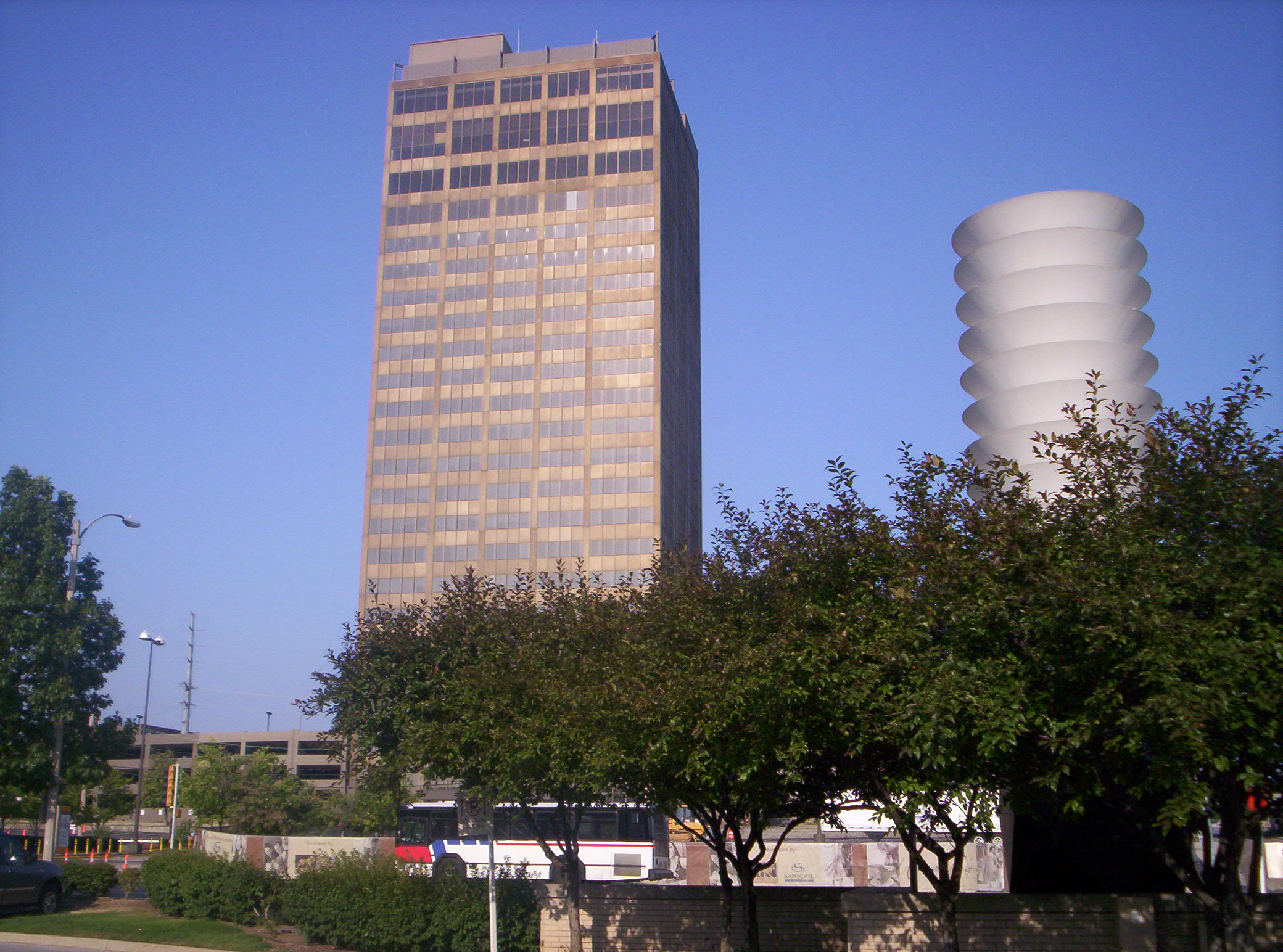
- In 2022, KDNL-TV moved its studios from downtown St. Louis to the University Tower in Richmond Heights.
- St. Louis, Missouri; United States
- Channels: Digital: 31 (UHF); Virtual: 30
- Branding: STL30

Programming
- Affiliations: 30.1: Independent; for others, see § Subchannels

Ownership
- Owner: Sinclair Broadcast Group; (KDNL Licensee, LLC)

History
- Founded: June 7, 1966
- First air date: June 8, 1969
- Former channel numbers: Analog: 30 (UHF, 1969–2009)
- Former affiliations: Independent (1969–1986); Fox (1986–1995); ABC (1995–2026); UPN (secondary, 1995–1998)

Technical information
- Licensing authority: FCC
- Facility ID: 56524
- ERP: 1,000 kW
- HAAT: 320.5 m (1,052 ft)
- Transmitter coordinates: 38°34′50″N 90°19′45″W

Links
- Public license information: Public file; LMS
- Website: stl30.com

KDNL-TV (channel 30), branded as STL30, is an independent television station in St. Louis, Missouri, United States. Owned by Sinclair Broadcast Group, the station maintains studios at the University Tower on South Brentwood Boulevard in the suburb of Richmond Heights and a transmitter in Shrewsbury.

Channel 30 in St. Louis was sought on several occasions in the 1950s and early 1960s, though no station materialized. The fourth attempt to build the channel was originally spearheaded by a group of local investors as well as Washington attorney John Dean; after the construction permit for KDNL-TV was sold to Thomas Mellon Evans, the station began broadcasting on June 8, 1969. It served as the second independent station for the St. Louis area, airing syndicated reruns as well as financial news and sports. Cox Broadcasting purchased KDNL-TV in 1981, in part because it held a permit for over-the-air subscription television broadcasting. Cox launched this service in June 1982, but it was a business failure, and Cox shut it down in February 1983. The station continued to be an overall money-loser and a misfit in the Cox station portfolio, even though it became the first local affiliate of Fox in 1986.

Barry Baker and Larry Marcus, former executives of rival independent KPLR-TV who were fired for trying to buy that station, purchased KDNL-TV from Cox in 1989. It became the first station in a St. Louis–based company eventually known as River City Broadcasting, which soon acquired other independent and Fox-affiliated stations. Ratings and revenue improved with the success of the Fox network, with total viewership approaching KPLR-TV, and led the station to start a local news department in January 1995. Under a deal announced in 1994 but carried out in August 1995, KDNL-TV lost its Fox affiliation and switched with KTVI to become the affiliate of ABC in St. Louis.

In 1996, River City merged into Sinclair Broadcast Group. However, KDNL's news department failed to gain traction, hurt by the traditionally poor ratings for ABC programming in the market; high turnover in news talent; a lack of full-day news service; and the resistance to change of many St. Louis viewers. In 1999, Baker left Sinclair and assigned an option to purchase KDNL-TV and six Sinclair-owned radio stations in St. Louis to Emmis Communications; the option resulted in a lawsuit settled with Sinclair retaining the TV station and selling off the radio properties. More critically, it led to neglect of the station's transmitter facility, causing signal issues, and the suspension of early evening newscasts for the struggling news operation. In the wake of the advertising slump after the September 11 attacks, Sinclair closed the KDNL-TV news department in 2001 and laid off all 47 staff. Since then, the station has largely been the fourth- or fifth-rated station in the market, with two short-lived and outsourced attempts at local news programming since the 2001 newsroom closure. ABC disaffiliated from KDNL on September 1, 2026, and moved to a subchannel of KMOV; KDNL replaced ABC network programming with syndicated shows and The National News Desk, Sinclair's national newscast. The station also made plans to resume local newscast production.

== Channel 30 prior to KDNL-TV ==
Three different attempts were made to start channel 30 in St. Louis. The assignment was added in 1952 when the Federal Communications Commission (FCC) ended its nearly four-year freeze on new television stations and introduced assignments in the new ultra high frequency (UHF) band. Applications were filed by the Empire Coil Company and the Lutheran Church–Missouri Synod for the channel, with the latter receiving the construction permit in February 1953 after Empire Coil withdrew. The church planned to run KFUO-TV as a noncommercial station in conjunction with its existing radio station. While it initially planned an early 1954 start, the station project was said to still be in consideration by February 1954, and the church surrendered the permit for cancellation in January 1956 after finding the potential for a UHF station poor.

In September 1956, the Plaza Radio and Television Company of New York applied for channel 30. Plaza also applied for authority to broadcast subscription television (STV) programming using the proposed station. The FCC indicated it would need to hold hearings to determine whether the channel should be awarded, even though no other group was seeking channel 30, because Plaza held but was not using a permit for channel 26 in San Francisco. This application and another for a station in Detroit were dismissed by the FCC in September 1958.

== Pre-construction ==
For the third time, channel 30 in St. Louis was sought when Washington, D.C.–based Globe Television Corporation filed to build the station in June 1964. The two leading stockholders in Globe were lawyers: Vincent B. Welch and Edward P. Morgan of the Washington firm of Welch, Mott & Morgan. Welch had founded the communications law firm in 1946, and Welch and Morgan were applying for new television stations nationwide, including Minneapolis; Columbus, Ohio; and Henderson, Nevada. The Welch–Morgan group was awarded the St. Louis permit and stations in Miami and San Jose, California, in October 1964. Globe Television renamed itself the Continental Summit Television Corporation after the permit was awarded; in June 1965, the company requested an extension of time to build. It stated that the Missouri Pacific Building, its intended transmitter site, was inadequate, as downtown office buildings interfered with the signal in the Illinois portion of the metropolitan area. It also requested that its application be switched from channel 30 to 24, which was inserted as part of a national overhaul of the UHF table of allocations that year. (Note: The channel 24 station, permitted with the call sign KGSL-TV, never took to the air. Continental was successful in building KGSC-TV in San Jose and, per Welch, learned that television "is a very expensive business with extreme losses". Welch noted that the recession of 1969–1970 made it impossible to obtain financing. The permit was canceled in March 1971.)

Boyd Fellows, the former general manager of educational station KETC and assistant to the president of Continental, then left that company to become the president of a new firm seeking channel 30, the Greater St. Louis Television Corporation. Other officers included a Black dentist, Dr. Benjamin F. Davis, and a Washington attorney, John Dean; his then-wife, Karla Hennings, was also a stockholder. Dean had participated in the formation of Greater St. Louis Television Corporation in January, while he was still employed by Welch & Morgan; when the firm found out about the work, it dismissed Dean for what Welch called "unethical conduct". Though characterizations of his dismissal varied, one former associate told the St. Louis Post-Dispatch that he was ordered to leave immediately and not given time to pack up his belongings. This story came to light during the Watergate hearings, during which Dean was a crucial witness as to the cover-up of the Watergate scandal, and was first reported by syndicated columnist Jack Anderson.

The Greater St. Louis Television Corporation received the construction permit for channel 30 on June 7, 1966, and took the call sign KDNL-TV on August 17.

== Evans Broadcasting ownership ==
Citing "unanticipated difficulties and unexpected changed circumstances", the stockholders of Greater St. Louis Television Corporation filed in April 1968 to sell the construction permit to financier Thomas Mellon Evans. The transfer was granted by the FCC in late July. At the time, Evans was in the middle of a push into UHF television, buying dormant construction permits for stations from Dallas to Worcester, Massachusetts.

Under Evans, construction activity finally commenced. The former studios of KMOX-TV at 13th and Cole streets were acquired to house channel 30, while the station was approved to build a tower in Shrewsbury, on land that was part of the Kenrick Seminary of the Roman Catholic Archdiocese of St. Louis. In April, a 1,100-foot (340 m) mast began rising on the site.

KDNL-TV debuted on June 8, 1969. Its program schedule was dominated by syndicated reruns of former network shows as well as a daytime financial news program, TV 30 Financial Observer. Channel 30 was the first station built by the newly formed Evans Broadcasting Corporation, which had plans to start activating additional stations. KDNL-TV trailed the established independent station in the St. Louis market, KPLR-TV, and had less than half of its audience share as of July 1972.

In 1977, KDNL added coverage of St. Louis Blues hockey road games, which aired through the 1980–81 season; after that, the games moved to KSDK (channel 5).

Evans made one attempt at expanding the reach of KDNL-TV deeper into Illinois. In June 1979, a subsidiary company, Southern Illinois Broadcasting Corporation, was granted the permit to build channel 13 at Mount Vernon, Illinois, for which it had filed two years prior. However, the Evans proposal attracted protests from southern Illinois residents who feared the channel would merely be used to rebroadcast KDNL-TV programming and wanted to see a full-fledged local station for their area. A farmer in Salem, Illinois, went as far as to refuse to lease her land for transmitter site construction when she learned of Evans's plans for channel 13. Though Evans had secured another site and even shipped the 1,000-foot (300 m) tower to Salem to be erected, the FCC responded to the residents' concerns by rescinding the permit grant in November 1979. In February 1980, citing the potential for years of litigation, it withdrew its attempt to build channel 13.

In April 1976, Evans Broadcasting applied for authority to broadcast over-the-air subscription television (STV) programming using KDNL-TV. The application languished because another company, Midwest St. Louis, had filed for channel 24 and proposed the same type of programming, and at the time the FCC only permitted one STV station per market. Despite that, the possibility of reaching the large, then-uncabled St. Louis market with pay TV programming excited interest from buyers in the STV space. Time Inc., which through its American Television and Communications unit had cable and pay TV operations, entered into negotiations to purchase the station from Evans. Evans reached an agreement to sell the station to Buford Television, a Texas company in the process of moving into subscription programming with stations such as WBTI in Cincinnati, in September 1979. With that sale pending, in February 1980, the FCC granted subscription authority to KDNL-TV. Though the FCC granted the Buford deal on April 30, the agreement was withdrawn on May 8.

== Cox Broadcasting ownership ==
Evans announced in March 1981 that he had sold KDNL-TV for $13.2 million to Cox Broadcasting, which at the time owned no UHF stations and only one independent, KTVU in Oakland, California. Upon completing the purchase in January 1982, Cox announced its plans to debut subscription television service on the station later in the year, once it had acquired sufficient equipment and personnel to handle the new operation. Cox Broadcasting president William A. Schwartz believed that the service could be viable even if just 15 to 20 percent of residents signed up for it, citing the large market and relatively low cable penetration. Beginning on June 1, 1982, KDNL-TV replaced its prime time and late night lineup with Preview, a subscription service featuring first-run movies and late night adult programming. Subscribers paid $24.90 a month plus a $49.95 installation fee.

Preview failed in St. Louis due to poor economic conditions and a lack of sports rights (though seven St. Louis Cardinals baseball games were telecast), in addition to a faster-than-anticipated wiring of the area for cable. In October, the company began aggressively discounting installation fees for new subscribers, causing it to lose money for every subscriber that signed up for Preview. Amid losses estimated at $100,000 a month and with just 10,000 households signed up, Cox announced in December 1982 that it would cease subscription television service on February 28, 1983. The Preview operation also hurt the station's ability to sell commercial advertising; advertisers were put off by the lost ad inventory and adult programming. Michael S. Kievman told a panel at the 1983 conference of the Association of Independent Television Stations (INTV) that he had received comments like "No one watches you, you're not really a TV station."

Emerging from Preview, Cox invested $2 million in updating the station's facilities. Blues hockey returned to the station, though it moved to KPLR-TV in 1986. KDNL-TV became a charter affiliate of Fox at its launch in October 1986. However, at the outset, Fox programming was little help for the station, which in May 1987 was tying KETC in the critical early evening period and was being beaten by KPLR by a factor of six-to-one. The network's flagging The Late Show with Joan Rivers was pulled from KDNL-TV's schedule two months before its cancellation.

== River City Broadcasting ownership ==
=== Building a media group ===
I said [to Cox], 'What does an outfit like yours want with that loser? It's never going to be No. 1.' That's all that mattered to them, being No. 1. They didn't see how the station could fit in. They didn't see the potential.

— Barry Baker, on how he convinced Cox to sell KDNL-TV

In the fall of 1988, two senior executives of KPLR-TV owner Koplar Communications—Barry Baker and Larry Marcus—formed Better Communications Inc. to acquire television and radio stations; an attempt to purchase KPLR-TV themselves resulted in company president Ted Koplar terminating their employment. Instead, their first purchase was KDNL, acquired from Cox. In selling channel 30, Cox Broadcasting president Stanley G. Mouse noted that the station "[did] not fit the profile of our other television stations", which included five network affiliates plus two independents in larger markets (KTVU and WKBD-TV in Detroit), all of which broadcast local news; another Cox source noted that the station had been a money-loser for Cox, in part because of the failed Preview service in 1982–1983. At the time of the purchase, KDNL had a total sign-on to sign-off share of five percent, trailing KPLR at 11 percent.

For Barry and Marcus, the purchase of KDNL-TV was the first act in the construction of a broadcasting group. In May 1989, a deal was struck to acquire KABB, an independent station in San Antonio, Texas, under the name River City Television Partners, which came to represent the entire group. The firm then expanded into radio broadcasting when it acquired St. Louis radio station KSTZ out of bankruptcy in 1990. River City changed the call letters and branded the station as "The Fox", a complement to his Fox affiliate. With the addition of the radio station, the company became River City Broadcasting (RCB).

KDNL finally took flight under River City ownership. Within a year, aided in part by the introduction of meters to measure ratings, the station doubled its total-day audience share from five to eleven percent, narrowly behind KPLR, as well as its revenue. By December 1993, it was the fourth highest-rated Fox affiliate in the nation, with an intensive focus on children's programming, counterprogramming the other stations, and Fox network programming. The 1994 edition of its Fox 30 Kids Fair, featuring guest appearances by two Power Rangers, attracted more than 50,000 attendees.

In February 1994, River City announced it would take the next step in growing KDNL-TV by starting a local half-hour 9 p.m. newscast to air beginning in early 1995. General manager Gregg Filandrinos credited the decision to start a newscast to Fox's acquisition of National Football League television rights. Renovation work estimated at more than $3 million began later that year to add news facilities to the channel 30 studios.

=== Affiliation switch to ABC and launch of local news ===
The arrival of NFL football to Fox, however, also triggered a massive realignment in television station affiliations which began in earnest on May 23, 1994, when New World Communications announced it would switch 12 of its stations affiliated with ABC, CBS, and NBC to Fox. Included were three stations New World had just agreed to acquire from Argyle Television, including KTVI, the then-ABC affiliate in St. Louis. With KTVI switching to Fox, the ABC affiliation was now open. KSDK and KMOV, the two strongest stations in the market, both were in long-term agreements with their respective networks. This left two primary contenders: KPLR and KDNL, plus home shopping station WHSL (channel 46). Though KPLR was the stronger-rated independent and a VHF station unlike KDNL, it was heavily committed to sports with contracts for Cardinals baseball and Blues hockey games that would lead to significant preemptions of network prime time programming, and it had also signed on to affiliate with The WB when it launched in 1995. The sports preemptions hurt KPLR in its negotiations with ABC.

On August 26, 1994, ABC announced that KDNL-TV would become its St. Louis affiliate beginning in mid-1995. Once that took place, KDNL-TV planned to scale up its nascent news operation to a level befitting a "Big Three" affiliate. The already-planned 9 p.m. newscast would shift to 10 p.m. and be joined by new 5 and 6 p.m. newscasts. The agreement was concurrent with a renewal for two of the three ABC stations River City was buying at the time: WSYX in Columbus, Ohio, and WLOS in Asheville, North Carolina. The third station, KOVR in Stockton, California, was excluded because it was losing its ABC affiliation to a station owned by the Belo Corporation.

In its last months with Fox, on January 1, 1995, KDNL began airing a 9 p.m. newscast, News 30 Now. It was the first new television newsroom in St. Louis since KPLR went on the air in 1959 and heavily relied on talent from elsewhere. Of the station's anchors and reporters, only one was already working in the market—the station's public affairs director, who doubled as the weekend anchor. The on-air talent came from stations as far away as Winnipeg, Orlando, and Spokane, Washington. Unlike other startup newsrooms of the period at Fox affiliates, KDNL shied away from an offbeat, edgy style in favor of a more straightforward news presentation.

In addition, KDNL began airing Star Trek: Voyager in overnight hours in 1995 after becoming a secondary affiliate of UPN. KDNL dropped UPN programming in January 1998, leaving the network without a St. Louis affiliate until 1999, when Christian station KNLC briefly began airing some of its programming.

Last logo as an ABC affiliate, used until 2026

KDNL-TV became the new ABC affiliate in St. Louis on August 7, 1995, with its level of network programming increasing from 35 to 85 hours a week. KDNL aired all ABC programming that KTVI had aired but maintained KTVI's preemption of the soap opera Loving. Fox Kids programming did not immediately move to KTVI; KNLC stepped in to pick up the shows, but issues over signal quality and replacement of commercials with public service announcements (including urging children to protest an execution), plus the size of the Fox Kids Club in St. Louis, the nation's largest, resulted in the children's block moving to KTVI in September 1996.

Immediately upon the switch, News 30 moved from 9 p.m. to 10 p.m. and debuted a 6 p.m. edition. The station also signed Don Marsh, a veteran St. Louis news anchor who had left KTVI the year before, to anchor its newscasts.

== Sinclair Broadcast Group ownership ==
=== Purchase of River City ===
On April 11, 1996, River City announced that it would merge with the Sinclair Broadcast Group for $2.3 billion, creating a company with 29 television and 34 radio stations nationwide. Barry Baker relocated to Baltimore, where Sinclair is headquartered, and remained with the combined company as the president and chief executive officer of its broadcasting division. At the time, KDNL-TV was unsettled in senior management. Original news director Gary Whitaker had left to run a TV station in Springfield, Missouri; the general manager then resigned to produce a syndicated talk show. Channel 30 was described by insiders as adrift, poorly rated, and with low morale in the newsroom. Its 10 p.m. newscast was well behind third-place KTVI. Sinclair continued to expand the former River City cluster in St. Louis by adding three radio stations being spun off by Heritage Media in 1997.

However, KDNL-TV's news efforts gained little traction and were plagued by high turnover as well as a reputation for sensationalized reporting. Tripp Frohlichstein, writing in the St. Louis Journalism Review, found the news department insufficiently staffed and the anchor team lacking chemistry; of the station's two daily newscasts, he wrote that KDNL-TV "gives the impression that it is not serious about the news". Don Marsh left the television news business in August 1998 when he failed to come to terms with Sinclair on a contract renewal; he was replaced by Patrick Emory, who had worked for CNN as well as KMOV-TV and KSDK. The other main anchor, Leslie Lyles—who had been with the station since the news department started—exited in 1999 and returned to Charleston, South Carolina, where she had been working prior to joining the KDNL news team. The station had three news directors in less than three and a half years, one of them—David Cohen—resigning in the wake of a racist joke he made at a news meeting. He told a Black reporter proposing a story on heart disease that "anyone who eats fried chicken and mashed potatoes is going to have heart disease". Gail Pennington of the St. Louis Post-Dispatch would later comment that the constant changes in on-air personnel were anathema to viewers, noting that "St. Louis doesn't like change." Frohlichstein concurred, writing, "More than most cities, St. Louis viewers stick with what they know."

=== Emmis option dispute ===
In February 1999, Barry Baker quit his position at Sinclair, where he was the "heir apparent" to company president David D. Smith, to become the president and chief operating officer of USA Networks. His employment agreement with Sinclair gave him the option to buy back Sinclair's media properties in one of two markets—St. Louis or Greenville, South Carolina—if exercised before August 8, 1999. In June, Baker transferred the option agreement to Emmis Communications, an Indianapolis-based radio and television station group that already owned three St. Louis radio stations, which then proceeded to attempt to exercise the agreement to purchase KDNL-TV and Sinclair's six local radio stations. (Note: The radio stations: KPNT (105.7 FM); KXOK-FM (97.1 FM, now KFTK-FM); WVRV (101.1 FM, now WXOS); WRTH (1430 AM, later KZQZ); WIL-FM (92.3); and KIHT (96.3 FM, now WFUN-FM).)

The manner in which the option agreement was transferred and executed instead led to a legal fight. In January 2000, Sinclair sued Emmis and Baker in its home state of Maryland and charged that the proposed buyer had no rights to acquire the stations, saying the option was too vague to take effect and was not designed to allow a party other than Baker to purchase them. In the lawsuit, Sinclair noted that Emmis asked Sinclair to pay millions of dollars to replace KDNL's transmitter and in employee severance costs, as well as to assign its ABC affiliation agreement unchanged to Emmis. The lawsuit was read by one Wall Street analyst as a stalling tactic to allow it to keep the cash flow from the radio stations for as long as possible before selling them. Two months later, Baker and Emmis filed a countersuit against Sinclair, accusing Sinclair of interfering with their agreement and engaging in "gross mismanagement" of the St. Louis stations. In June, Sinclair and Emmis settled the legal actions; Sinclair retained KDNL-TV and sold the St. Louis radio stations, the last ones it owned, to Emmis for $220 million.

The effect of the option agreement dispute was to leave KDNL-TV in a state of limbo and neglect for a year. Maintenance of the station's equipment fell off, and after a late 1999 fire affecting the transmission line on its Shrewsbury mast, the transmitter repeatedly failed, forcing KDNL off the air. Because of this and work to install KDNL's digital signal, which signed on January 2, 2001, the station operated on severely reduced power, leaving many non-cable homes without KDNL or ABC programming. The news department downsized from 5 and 10 p.m. newscasts, having abandoned the 6 p.m. timeslot in 1996, to just the 10 p.m. edition. While the early report was reinstated in December 2000, it could not regain the viewers it had, with more than twice as many St. Louis-area households watching Sabrina the Teenage Witch on KPLR-TV. Despite this turmoil, KDNL shocked industry observers by winning the regional Emmy Award for best large-market newscast.

=== Discontinuation of local news ===
...in St. Louis, the landscape for news is always treacherous, especially for a station like KDNL. News viewership here is deeply entrenched, with television watchers overwhelmingly choosing KSDK and KMOV. Read a ratings report from 10 years ago, or even 20, and the substance is very much the same: Channel 5 in first place, and Channel 4 battling to go ahead but never quite managing.

— Gail Pennington, television critic, St. Louis Post-Dispatch

On September 28, 2001, KDNL-TV general manager Tom Tipton informed the staff and the public that the station would cease airing local news on October 12, laying off all 47 staffers in its newsroom. Tipton cited "the increased competitive landscape and current market conditions" that "made it increasingly difficult to operate a competitive news operation". Other factors included a negative jolt to advertising revenue compounded by the September 11 attacks and financial trouble within Sinclair itself. At the time, Sinclair was closing down some of its underperforming news departments across the country. In November 2000, it shut down the newsroom at WTWC-TV in Tallahassee, Florida; it also had cut back the newsroom at WXLV-TV in Winston-Salem, North Carolina, before closing it altogether in January 2002. As a result of closing its news department, KDNL-TV became the only Big Four-affiliated station in the 25 largest media markets in the United States not to offer any local news.

Sinclair once again tried to sell the station in June 2002 as part of the company's eventually aborted attempt to sell all seven of its ABC-affiliated stations to focus on its Fox and WB stations.

Even without local news, KDNL had largely been among the weakest affiliates of ABC since switching to the network and generally ranked fifth in total ratings. The network's difficulty in St. Louis was not new: the market had always been an underperformer for ABC, even when KTVI was the affiliate, though NBC and CBS had higher-than-average viewership.

In 2017, Sinclair entered into an agreement to acquire Tribune Media, owner of KTVI and KPLR. The two stations were in the top four in ratings, but KDNL was not; Sinclair proposed to own KTVI and KDNL while providing services to KPLR. In February 2018, it amended its proposal to specify a spin-off of KPLR to an independent buyer. On April 24, 2018, the Meredith Corporation, owner of KMOV, announced that it would purchase KPLR-TV for $65 million; the bid was soon scrapped amid objections by the Department of Justice, with Sinclair instead proposing to sell KPLR to a divestiture trust. The larger Sinclair–Tribune deal never progressed; after the FCC designated it for hearing by an administrative law judge, Tribune called off the deal and sued Sinclair in August 2018.

=== Local news programming since 2001 ===
==== News share agreement with KSDK (2011–2014) ====
On January 3, 2011, NBC affiliate KSDK began producing weeknight 5 and 10 p.m. newscasts for KDNL through a news share agreement. The newscasts, known as STL Now on ABC 30, were produced at KSDK's Market Street studios in Downtown St. Louis and required the hiring of additional personnel. KDNL general manager Tom Tipton stated that the station did not want to run simulcast or repurposed newscasts in its efforts to return daily news broadcasts to the station. The KSDK-produced newscasts on KDNL were pre-taped in advance. There was no sports report featured during the program. The news share agreement between the two stations was quite unusual given the rarity of a Big Three network affiliate producing newscasts for another Big Three station. In this case, KDNL and KSDK competed against one another in both timeslots. Although KDNL only aired local news programming on weekdays, the station did air replays of KSDK's entertainment/features program Show Me St. Louis on weekends. The agreement with KSDK was to end on December 31, 2013, but it continued into January 2014.

==== The Allman Report (2014–2018) ====
On February 10, 2014, the St. Louis Post-Dispatch reported that the station intended to restart an in-house news department, with 5 and 10 p.m. newscasts slated to be anchored by KFTK (97.1 FM) morning host and former KMOV reporter Jamie Allman. On November 24, 2014, KDNL officially announced that it would launch its new news program, The Allman Report, in January 2015. KDNL and Allman described the program as an extension of his radio show, with a conservative, "debate-driven format" that focused on local headlines and issues. The Allman Report originated from the studios of Pelopidas in Brentwood rather than from KDNL's facilities.

The program continued until April 9, 2018, when it was canceled by KDNL amid calls for a viewer and advertiser boycott. The cancellation took place two weeks after Allman tweeted a message alluding to him wanting to assault 17-year-old David Hogg, a student who was on campus at the time of the Parkland high school shooting, by sodomizing him with a heated fire poker for his gun control activism. Allman was fired from KFTK and took his Twitter account private. Allman was later re-hired by Salem Media Group-owned radio station KXFN in February 2019, though the program was short-lived after KXFN's sale to Relevant Radio, which converted it to a Spanish-language Catholic talk format in the fall of the same year. After converting his show to a self-distributed podcast, he began hosting mornings on KTLK-FM (104.9) after iHeartMedia converted that station to a conservative talk format in August 2021.

=== Disaffiliation from ABC ===
Deadline reported on July 24, 2026, that KDNL would disaffiliate from ABC on September 1 after the expiration of its affiliation agreement; the network moved that day to a subchannel of KMOV. KDNL replaced ABC programming with syndicated fare and The National News Desk, Sinclair's nationally-produced newscast. Sinclair also planned to restart local newscasts on the station, with a KDNL spokesperson saying, "this new direction allows us to invest directly in local news and programming, reinforcing our long-term commitment to serving the St. Louis community".

== Local programming ==
KDNL-TV's local programming, as of June 2023, included City Corner, a weekly public affairs program; a selection of St. Louis-area church services; and Them Yo People, a man-on-the-street interview program produced in St. Louis and also aired in other nearby markets.

== Technical information ==
=== Subchannels ===
KDNL-TV is broadcast from a transmitter in Shrewsbury. Its signal is multiplexed:

Subchannels of KDNL-TV
Subchannel	Res.	Short name	Programming
30.1	720p	KDNL	Main KDNL-TV programming
30.2	480i	ROAR	Roar
30.3	480i	Charge!	Charge!
30.4	480i	TheNest	The Nest
30.5	480i	Comet	Comet
11.2	480i	365BLK	365BLK (KPLR-TV)

Broadcast on behalf of another station

=== Analog-to-digital conversion ===
KDNL-TV shut down its analog signal, over UHF channel 30, on February 17, 2009, the original date on which full-power television stations in the United States were scheduled to transition from analog to digital broadcasts under federal mandate (the official date was pushed back to June 12). The station's digital signal continued to broadcast on its pre-transition UHF channel 31, using virtual channel 30.
