= KFTK-FM =

Radio station in Florissant, Missouri, serving St. Louis

- Florissant, Missouri; United States
- Broadcast area: Greater St. Louis
- Frequency: 97.1 MHz (HD Radio)
- Branding: 97.1 FM Talk

Programming
- Format: Talk radio
- Subchannels: HD2: Westwood One Sports
- Affiliations: Compass Media Networks; Fox News Radio; Premiere Networks; Radio America; Westwood One

Ownership
- Owner: Audacy, Inc. (Sale to Hoffman Media Group pending.); (Audacy License, LLC)
- Sister stations: KEZK-FM; KMOX; KMOX-FM; KYKY; WFUN-FM

History
- First air date: April 15, 1977
- Former call signs: KSCF (1977–1980); KCFM (1980–1985); KLTH (1985–1989); KHTK (1989–1992); KXOK-FM (1992–2000); KFTK (2000–2016)
- Call sign meaning: "FM Talk"

Technical information
- Licensing authority: FCC
- Facility ID: 73890
- Class: C1
- ERP: 100,000 watts
- HAAT: 171 meters (561 ft)
- Transmitter coordinates: 38°46′45.1″N 90°43′43.4″W

Links
- Public license information: Public file; LMS
- Webcast: Listen live (via Audacy)
- Website: www.audacy.com/971talk

KFTK-FM (97.1 MHz) is a commercial radio station licensed to Florissant, Missouri, and serving the Greater St. Louis area. It airs a talk radio format. and is owned by Audacy, Inc. The station's studios are on Olive Street in downtown St. Louis.

KFTK-FM is a class C1 station, and has an effective radiated power (ERP) of 100,000 watts, the maximum for most stations. Its transmitter is located on Magdalen Lane in O'Fallon. Besides a standard analog transmission, KFTK-FM broadcasts using HD Radio technology, carrying the Westwood One Sports on its HD2 digital subchannel.

== Programming ==
KFTK-FM airs a conservative talk format. It has mostly local shows on weekdays during the day, with Marc Cox in mornings, Annie Frey in early afternoons and Mark Reardon in late afternoons. The rest of the weekday schedule is nationally syndicated programs: Brian Kilmeade and Friends, Fox Across America with Jimmy Failla, The Dana Loesch Show, Coast to Coast AM with George Noory and This Morning, America's First News with Gordon Deal.

Weekends focus on specialty topics, including money, health, guns and home improvement. Some shows are paid brokered programming. Syndicated shows include Our American Stories with Lee Habeeb, The Guy Benson Show and Markley, Van Camp and Robbins. Most hours begin with an update from Fox News Radio.

== History ==
=== Early years ===
The station signed on the air on April 15, 1977. Its call sign was KSCF, which stood for St. Charles and Florissant. The station featured a middle of the road/easy listening format. One of the original owners was Harlan "Grant" Horton, a longtime St. Louis broadcaster at KSD, WRTH, KMOX, KXOK and WEW. The sign on of 97.1 caused KADI-FM to move from its original frequency of 96.5 to 96.3 to accommodate the new radio station.

=== Adult contemporary (1980–1989) ===
In 1980, after the KCFM call letters were dropped by 93.7, they were picked up by 97.1, and the station aired an adult contemporary format. Then in November 1985, the call letters were changed once again. They became KLTH "K-Lite 97", with a soft adult contemporary format. KLTH gradually segued into a format called "new adult contemporary" (NAC), a forerunner of smooth jazz. The station was re-branded as "Breeze 97".

=== Top 40 (1989–1992) ===
On August 2, 1989, the station was sold once again. The new owners flipped the station to Top 40 as "Hot 97" with the call letters KHTK. The Top 40 format ended when then-rival WKBQ was briefly under lease by the station's owner Saul Frischling of Pittsburgh. Both top 40 stations were merged at 106.5, with DJs from both stations moving to the new outlet.

=== Urban AC (1992–1998) ===
On November 11, 1992, KHTK changed call letters to KXOK-FM, and flipped to urban AC as "Mix 97.1". In effect, the urban oldies format from the former KXOK (630 AM) was moved to FM. "Mix" would try to compete with the urban AC leader in St. Louis, KMJM-FM ("Majic 108"). KXOK AM and KXOK-FM would briefly simulcast until the AM station was taken off the air ahead of a sale to a religious broadcaster. The station carried the syndicated Tom Joyner Morning Show, which was heard in the market for many years across multiple stations.

=== Classic rock (1998–2000) ===
In 1998, Frischling sold KXOK-FM to the Sinclair Broadcast Group, which owned television station KDNL-TV, along with radio stations KPNT, WVRV, WIL-FM, and KIHT. In September of that year, the urban format was dropped, and the station began simulcasting KPNT.

On September 25, 1998, KXOK-FM began stunting with a 48-hour loop of "Welcome to the Jungle" by Guns N' Roses. Two days later, KXOK-FM switched formats. It began playing classic rock as "97 FM The Rock" while retaining the KXOK-FM call letters. To celebrate St. Louis Cardinals baseball player Mark McGwire hitting 70 home runs, the station launched by playing 7,000 songs in a row without commercials or DJ interruption. The first song on "The Rock" was "There's Only One Way to Rock" by Sammy Hagar.

Despite a less-than-optimal signal, the station enjoyed the most success seen on the frequency to that date playing classic rock. It was a competitor to Emmis Communications' KSHE, at times beating the veteran rock station in the overall ratings. KSHE aired the syndicated Bob and Tom Show in morning drive time, while KXOK countered with local hosts (and KSHE alumni) Randy Raley and Mike Doran. Other KXOK DJs included Tom O'Keefe (middays), Jason Mack (afternoons), and Michelle Matthews (evenings). Overnights were automated. The station began with a standard classic rock format, playing rock hits from the 1960s and 70s. That evolved to playing a sizable amount of 1980s hair bands. The station would also play occasional 1990s music from artists like Pearl Jam, The Black Crowes, and Cracker.

=== Talk (2000–present) ===
In the fall of 2000, Emmis Communications added to its St. Louis radio station cluster by purchasing properties from Sinclair Broadcasting, which wanted to focus on its television properties. The sale to Emmis led KXOK and KSHE to become sister stations. Upon purchasing KXOK, and to avoid overlap with KSHE, KXOK changed formats. It became a talk radio station on October 16, 2000. The call letters changed to KFTK two days later.

Initially, the station focused on a female audience, in contrast to male-dominated talk stations already on the air in St. Louis. Syndicated personalities included Bob and Sheri, Dr. Joy Browne, Clark Howard, Dr. Laura, Phil Hendrie, Rhona at Night, Loveline, and John and Jeff, as well as local host Dave Glover. The station used the name "97.1 FM Talk". Failing to reach much of an audience, the station shifted toward more political talk in 2002, adding such syndicated hosts as Don Imus, Bill O'Reilly, and Sean Hannity. The station briefly changed its name to "97-1 the Link...Real Life Radio", but soon returned to the "FM Talk" moniker.

The call sign was modified from KFTK to KFTK-FM on September 8, 2016. On September 15, 2016, KFTK-FM began simulcasting on WQQX (1490 AM), renamed KFTK, and FM translator station K254CR to improve the station's coverage in downtown St. Louis and the Illinois side of the market.

Emmis exited the St. Louis market in 2018. KFTK-FM and KNOU were sold to Entercom (now Audacy). The simulcast over KFTK 1490 ended on March 20, 2020, when the AM station's license was cancelled by the FCC. It was revealed that the AM station's ownership was a shell corporation. In reality, a convicted felon owned it. FM translator K254CR was not affected, and was subsequently reassigned to simulcast KFTK-FM. That lasted until March 22, 2021, when K254CR began rebroadcasting AM sister station KMOX.

In 2018, KFTK-FM ended The Jaime Allman Show. Allman was accused of threatening gun-control advocate David Hogg on social media. In January 2024, KFTK-FM began syndicating a local program, The Josh Hammer Show.

On June 29, 2026, Audacy announced the sale of KFTK-FM and its sister stations to Hoffman Media Group.
