= WXOS =

ESPN Radio affiliate in East St. Louis, Illinois

- East St. Louis, Illinois; United States
- Broadcast area: Greater St. Louis
- Frequency: 101.1 MHz (HD Radio)
- Branding: 101 ESPN

Programming
- Format: Sports
- Subchannels: HD2: ESPNews
- Affiliations: ESPN Radio; St. Louis Blues

Ownership
- Owner: Hubbard Broadcasting; (St. Louis FCC License Sub, LLC)
- Sister stations: KPNT, KSHE, WARH, WIL-FM

History
- First air date: May 13, 1966 (as WMRY)
- Former call signs: WMRY (1966–1989); WSNL (1989–1991); WFXB (1991–1994); WVRV (1994–2006); WMVN (2006–2008)
- Call sign meaning: X's and O's (icons representing players in football play diagrams)

Technical information
- Facility ID: 56512
- Class: C1
- ERP: 100,000 watts
- HAAT: 300.4 meters (986 ft)
- Transmitter coordinates: 38°28′56″N 90°23′53″W

Links
- Webcast: Listen Live
- Website: 101espn.com

WXOS (101.1 FM) is a commercial radio station affiliated with ESPN Radio and licensed to East St. Louis, Illinois, broadcasting to the Greater St. Louis area. Owned by Hubbard Broadcasting, its studio facilities are located on Olive Boulevard in St. Louis, while its transmitter is located in south St. Louis County near Concord.

== Programming ==
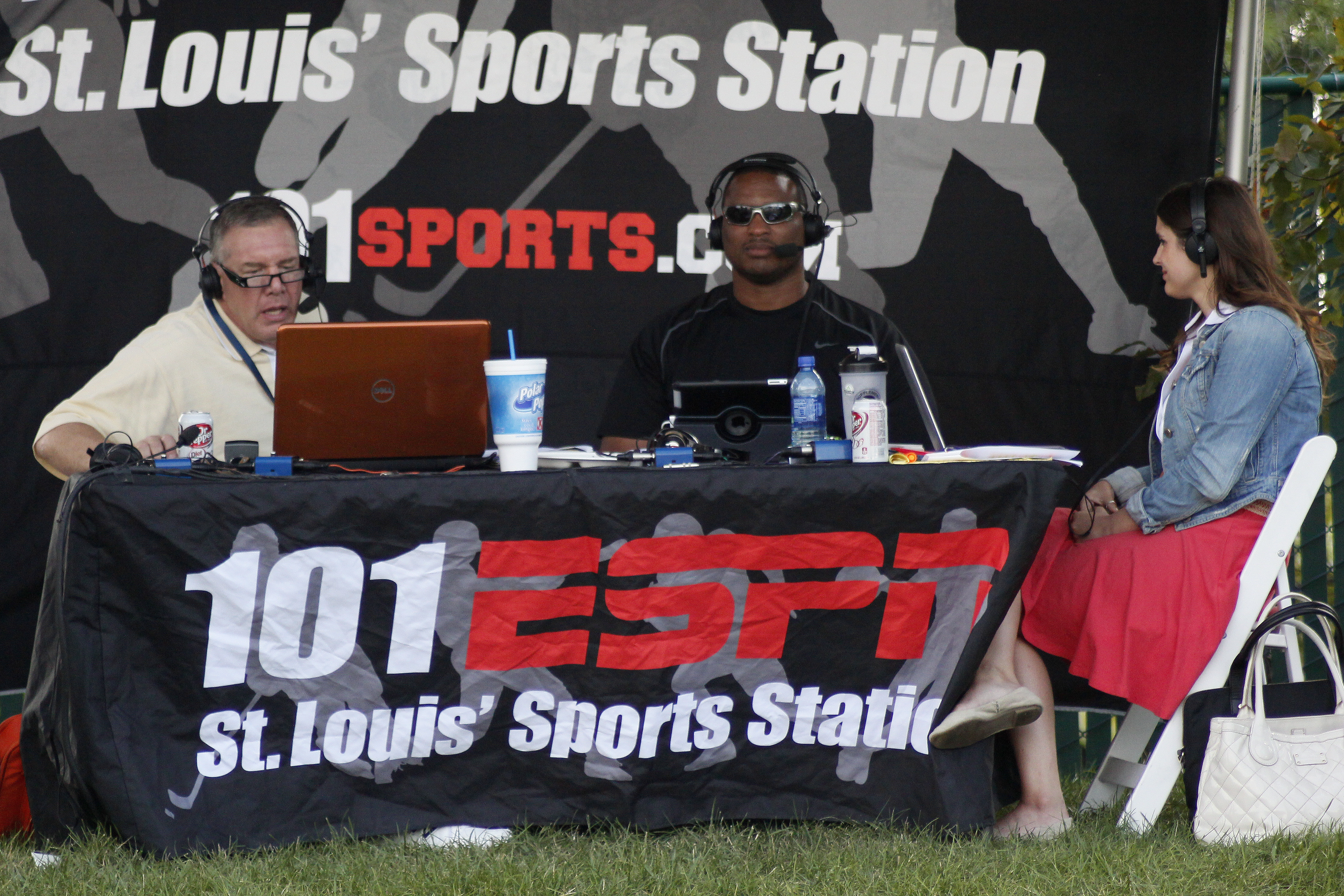
from left: Randy Karraker, D'Marco Farr, and Michelle Smallmon

WXOS, an ESPN Radio affiliate, carries ESPN shows on nights and weekends. The station is the flagship station for the St. Louis Blues. It also previously held the rights to Saint Louis Billikens men's basketball which it acquired from KFNS, until 2020 saw the Bills move to KMOX. Play-by-play announcer Bob Ramsey joined 101 ESPN as a member of the Fast Lane when the station launched. 101 ESPN also airs the College Football Playoff, the World Series, the NBA Finals, and other events from ESPN Radio.

Sportswriter and The Fast Lane Producer Michelle Smallmon had been filling the spot left by Chris Duncan on The Fast Lane. However, that spot was permanently filled by Brad Thompson in 2014. Smallmon later became a co-host on "The Bernie Miklasz Show" in 2018 but left the show in 2019. As of May 2020, Randy Karraker and Smallmon co-host the station's morning drive program, "Karraker & Smallmon".

WXOS held the radio rights to the St. Louis Rams of the National Football League from 2009 to 2015 after which they relocated to Los Angeles. Rams games were previously aired on KLOU. The station also broadcasts selected Chicago Bulls and Memphis Grizzlies games.

== History ==
=== Early years ===
WXOS has adopted several call signs and formats since it began airing on May 13, 1966. The station first broadcast under WMRY and had studios based out of the Our Lady of the Snows shrine near Belleville. The station, however, never broadcast a religious format. Rather, they aired non-commercial pop music with periodic positive motivational messages from different faiths interspersed. In the mid-1980s, the station became a commercial station, and aired a progressive rock format. Their studios were relocated to an office park in St. Louis County, Missouri.

=== 1991–1994: Various rock formats ===
In January 1991, the station flipped to soft AC as "Sunny 101", WSNL. Two months later, the station flipped to "mellow rock" as WFXB, "The Fox", and simulcast on KFXB (105.7 FM). In February 1993, the simulcasting ended, though 101.1 would continue to carry the mellow rock format, which would evolve to a AAA format, and then an "Arrow"-type classic hits format, while still being called "The Fox".

=== 1994–2006: "The River" ===
On November 24, 1994, the station would return to AAA as "101 The River" and the WVRV call letters. By Summer of 1997, the format evolved to modern AC. In 2004, the format shifted to adult top 40, but retained the "River" moniker and call letters.

=== 2006–2008: "Movin" ===
MoViN' logo (2006–2008)

On September 8, 2006, at 11:00 a.m., WVRV changed its format to rhythmic adult contemporary, changed its moniker to "MOViN 101.1", and adopted the slogan of "Makes You Feel Good". The first song on "MOViN" was "Good Vibrations" by Marky Mark & the Funky Bunch. They were the fourth station to adopt the "MOViN" moniker, after KQMV in Seattle, KMVN in Los Angeles and KYMV in Salt Lake City. The announcement was made with no prior notification to its on-air personalities, and they were dismissed on short notice, as is the norm in format switches. The station announced that it would go 90 days without personalities before DJs would be announced. Under the Rhythmic AC format, the station's playlist consisted of "adult rhythmic hits from today, the 1980s and 1990s, plus a sprinkling of rhythmic classics." The station would change call letters to WMVN shortly afterward.

The first on-air DJs were former Steve & DC castmember Jill Devine, Mysti and Raven Rush, who joined on December 15. On February 12, 2007, former KYKY morning show co-host Steph Duran joined MOViN' for mornings. Prior to joining WMVN, Duran had been at KZON and KUPD in Phoenix. She was joined on September 1, 2007, by co host Eric Schmidt. Schmidt had previously worked at WMVN sister station WARH. A veteran of the St. Louis market he had also worked at WVRV, KPNT, WXTM, WMLL, KCLC, and KFAV. WMVN was programmed by Jules Riley, who also programs WARH.

After an economic-related shakeup on March 3, 2008, Mysti and Raven Rush were let go. Schmidt moved to the afternoon drive slot and Steph Duran took a solo morning shift. The format was shifted to hot adult contemporary after this.

=== 2009-present: "ESPN 101" ===
On September 22, 2008, it was announced that WMVN would flip to an all-sports format on January 1, 2009, featuring a combination of local and ESPN Radio programming. The station would also change call letters to the current WXOS. To prepare for the change, on October 10, WMVN began stunting with all-Christmas music, which lasted until the full format flip occurred.

Bonneville International announced the sale of WXOS, as well as 16 other stations, to Twin Cities-based Hubbard Broadcasting on January 19, 2011. The sale was completed on April 29, 2011.
