= WFUN-FM =

Adult R&B radio station in St. Louis

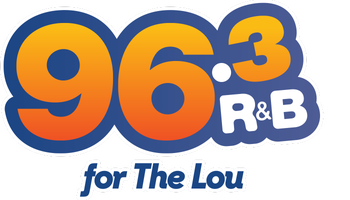
- St. Louis, Missouri; United States
- Broadcast area: Greater St. Louis
- Frequency: 96.3 MHz (HD Radio)
- Branding: 96.3 R&B

Programming
- Language: English
- Format: Urban adult contemporary
- Subchannels: HD2: Classical music "Classical 107.3"; HD3: Classic rock "WAR Radio" Weber Automotive Rocks

Ownership
- Owner: Audacy, Inc. (Sale to Hoffman Media Group pending.); (Audacy License, LLC)
- Sister stations: KEZK-FM; KFTK-FM; KMOX; KMOX-FM; KYKY

History
- First air date: December 11, 1959
- Former call signs: KADI (1959–75); KADI-FM (1975–78); KADI (1978–79); KADI-FM (1979-87); KRJY (1987–94); KIHT (1994–2015); KNOU (2015–20)
- Former frequencies: 96.5 MHz (1959–72)
- Call sign meaning: former call sign of KXBS, which formerly aired a children's radio format as "Fun Radio"

Technical information
- Licensing authority: FCC
- Facility ID: 27022
- Class: C1
- ERP: 92,000 watts
- HAAT: 309 meters (1,014 ft)
- Transmitter coordinates: 38.5744°N 90.3255°W
- Translator: HD2: 107.3 K297BI (St. Louis)

Links
- Public license information: Public file; LMS
- Webcast: Listen live
- Website: www.audacy.com/963rnb

WFUN-FM (96.3 MHz) is a radio station in St. Louis, Missouri. The station airs an urban adult contemporary radio format branded as "96.3 The Lou". Owned by Audacy, Inc., the station's studios are located on Olive Street in St. Louis, while its transmitter is located off Watson Road in Shrewsbury.

WFUN-FM has two HD Radio channels:

- 96.3-HD2 airs a classical music format operated by the non-profit Radio Arts Foundation, branded as "Classic 107.3" (relayed on FM translator K297BI 107.3 FM)
- 96.3-HD3 airs a classic rock format as "WAR-FM Weber Automotive Rocks".

== History ==
=== Early years ===
The 96.5 frequency originally signed on the air on December 22, 1959 as KADI, the sister station to AM 1460 KADY in St. Charles. The stations were owned by William R. Cady (hence the KADI call letters); KADI-FM, the first new commercial FM in St. Louis since 1955, mostly simulcasted the AM station's programming. In 1965, as KADY failed due to financial difficulties, KADI was sold to Vanguard Broadcasting and returned to the air in 1966. In 1969, Richard J. Miller, owner of AM station KXLW in Clayton (now KSIV), acquired KADI and relaunched it with a progressive rock format. In 1972, KADI-FM was moved down one notch on the FM dial to 96.3 MHz to allow new station KSCF (now KFTK-FM) in Florissant to go on the air at 97.1 MHz.

=== 1987-1993: Soft Rock ===
In May 1987, the station's call letters were changed to KRJY, and the station switched to a soft adult contemporary format as "K-Joy 96" (later "J96"). In late 1991, the station switched to 1950s/1960s oldies as "Jukebox 96."

=== 1993-2015: Classic Hits ===
In 1993, the station was sold by R.J. Miller to Heritage Media, who also owned WIL-FM and WRTH. On March 24, 1994, at noon, the station adopted the KIHT call letters and "K-HITS 96" identity, flipping to a "Greatest Hits of the '70s" format, which would evolve into classic hits over the next few years. Heritage's St. Louis properties were sold to the Sinclair Broadcast Group in the mid-1990s, and Sinclair sold the station to Emmis Communications in 2000. In October of that year, KIHT became the flagship for the #1 rated "Steve & DC" morning program. The fans of the much-talked about duo immediately followed them down the dial from WKKX (106.5 FM) to 96.3, and lifted KIHT from tenth place to first in persons 25 to 54 in only one ratings period upon the release of the Arbitron Fall 2000 book—a feat that continues to go unmatched in St. Louis radio history.

In 2014, while keeping a Classic Hits direction, KIHT added more music from the late 1980s to the early 2000s, to compete against adult hits-formatted WARH.

=== 2015-2020: Top 40 ===
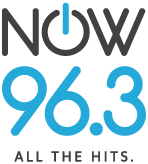
Logo as 96.3 Now, 2015-2020

On January 30, 2015, at 5 a.m., after playing "Always Something There to Remind Me" by Naked Eyes, "I'll Be There For You" by Bon Jovi, "It's Still Rock & Roll To Me" by Billy Joel, "Listen To The Music" by Doobie Brothers, "She's So High" by Tal Bachman, "The Warrior" by Scandal, "Rock'n Me" by The Steve Miller Band, "Get The Party Started" by P!nk, and "Mama Said Knock You Out" by LL Cool J, KIHT flipped to an adult-leaning Top 40/CHR format as "Now 96-3". The first song on "Now" was "Blank Space" by Taylor Swift. On February 5, 2015, KIHT changed call letters to KNOU to match the "Now" branding. In January 2018, KNOU and KFTK-FM were sold by Emmis to Entercom. In March 2018, after Entercom began managing the station under a local marketing agreement, KNOU shifted to a more mainstream CHR as its positioning was redundant to new sister station KYKY.

=== 2020-Present: R&B ===
On November 5, 2020, Urban One agreed to a station swap with Entercom in which they would swap ownership of four stations, including the intellectual property of WFUN-FM (95.5), to Entercom in exchange for WBT/WBT-FM, WFNZ and WLNK in Charlotte, North Carolina. As part of the terms of the deal, Entercom would take over operations via a local marketing agreement on November 23; however, as the station itself would remain with Urban One, it was announced that the Adult R&B format and WFUN-FM's intellectual property would move to KNOU on that date. The change took place at midnight on November 23; subsequently, Gateway Creative Broadcasting announced it would purchase WFUN-FM's former frequency and flip it to Christian Rhythmic CHR under the "Boost Radio" branding in January 2021. On November 24, 2020, the WFUN-FM call sign moved to 96.3; 95.5 then became KXBS.

The KNOU call letters would later be reused on the former KAMP-FM in Los Angeles following a rebranding in April 2021 and would last until December of that year when it flipped to a simulcast of KNX.

On June 29, 2026, Audacy announced the sale of WFUN-FM and its sister stations to Hoffman Media Group.
