= Mama's Pride =

American rock band

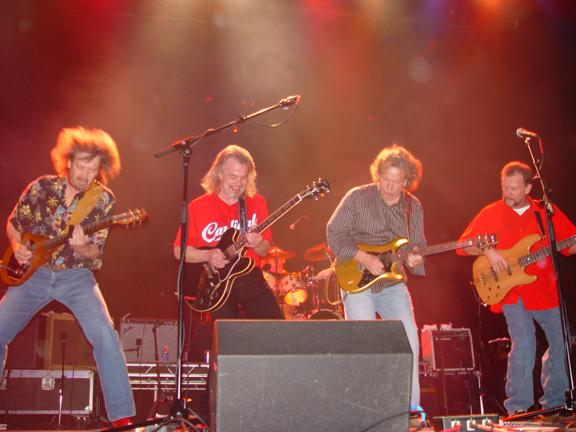
- Mama's Pride in 2006

Background information
- Origin: St. Louis, Missouri, U.S.
- Genres: Southern rock; rock/blues rock
- Years active: 1972–1982, 1992–present
- Labels: Atco, Atlantic
- Members: Pat Liston; Danny Liston; Kevin Sanders; Dickie Steltenpohl; Paul Willett
- Past members: Mike Gordon; Joe Turek; Frank Gagliano; Jeff Schmidt; Jim Vogts; Tom Denman, Gary Bourgeois; Max Baker
- Website: mamaspride.tripod.com

Mama's Pride is an American rock band that was formed in St. Louis, Missouri, in 1972, was active until 1982, then again from 1992.

== History ==
After forming in St. Louis, Missouri, in 1972, the band quickly grew a strong following. They signed to Atco Records in 1974, a division of Atlantic Records at that time, now a division of Warner Brothers. They released the self-titled album Mama's Pride in 1975, which was produced by Grammy Award winning producer Arif Mardin. The band's second album, Uptown & Lowdown, was released in 1977. The band toured with rock acts such as Lynyrd Skynyrd, the Allman Brothers, the Charlie Daniels Band, the Outlaws, Todd Rundgren, Alice Cooper, REO Speedwagon, and Heart.

Ronnie Van Zandt of Lynyrd Skynyrd had expressed interest in producing the band's third album, shortly before his death in 1977. The band spent the majority of 1978 on tour with Gregg Allman as his backing band for his 1978 solo tour. The group disbanded in 1982.

They reunited ten years later in 1992 and released Guard Your Heart, which was produced by Jim Gaines.

The band has been doing yearly reunion shows to sold-out crowds at the Pageant Theater in their hometown of St. Louis since 2003. In 2006, the band released a double live album entitled Alive and Well. On December 1, 2012, the band celebrated their 40th anniversary with a sold-out show at the Pageant. That same week the band was inducted into the KSHE Real Rock Hall of Fame. Their song "Blue Mist" was voted as the #1 KSHE Klassic (as voted on by listeners). On May 18, 2013, Mama's Pride joined Ted Nugent, Styx, and REO Speedwagon for a show at Verizon Wireless Amphitheater in St. Louis.

On November 13, 2015, members of Mama's Pride played the opening of the KSHE Birthday Bash at a sold out Peabody Opera House in St. Louis and opened for REO Speedwagon. Original member Danny Liston (vocals, guitar) and longtime member Richard 'Dickie' Steltenpohl (bass, vocals) were accompanied by James Comparato (guitar, slide guitar, vocals), Steve Pecaro (guitar), Harold Draper (keyboards) and James Jackson (drums). They were also joined on stage by original REO Speedwagon member and early Pavlov's Dog member Steve Scorfina.

On December 10, 2016, the Pat Liston Band played at the Pageant to an enthusiastic crowd supporting the release of Liston's book 13 Notes to Life. The Pat Liston Band consists of original Mama's Pride members Pat Liston (vocals, guitar, piano, slide guitar), Richard 'Dickie' Steltenpohl (bass, vocals) and Tom Denman (keyboards, B3 and vocals) along with James Comparato (Danny Liston and Friends, the Brothers, Pepperland, Portrait: The Music of Kansas, Dollar Crown) (guitar, slide guitar, vocals), R. Scott Bryan (Sheryl Crow, Peter Mayer) (percussion), Tommy Martin (Irish Uilleann pipes) and Andy Herrin (Cavo, Repeat Repeat).

== Discography ==
| Year | Title | Label |
|---|---|---|
| 1975 | Mama's Pride | Atco/Atlantic |
| 1976 | Uptown & Lowdown | Atco/Atlantic |
| 1992 | Guard Your Heart | Independent |
| 2006 | Alive and Well (live album) | Independent |
