= KMOX-FM =

Radio station in Hazelwood–St. Louis, Missouri

Simulcast of KMOX, St. Louis
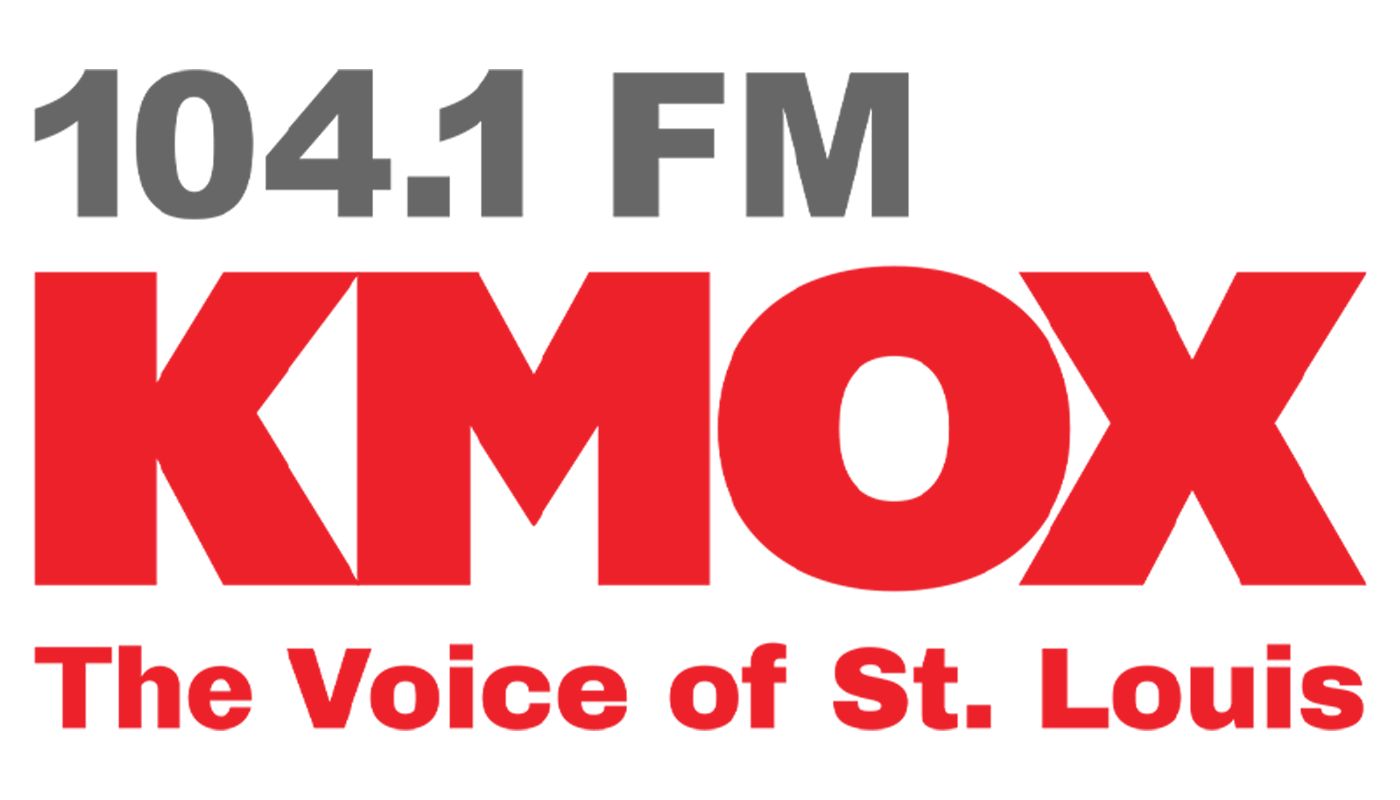
- Hazelwood, Missouri; United States
- Broadcast area: Greater St. Louis
- Frequency: 104.1 MHz (HD Radio)
- Branding: 104.1 FM KMOX

Programming
- Format: Talk radio
- Network: ABC News Radio
- Affiliations: KMOV; Premiere Networks; Westwood One; St. Louis Cardinals Radio Network

Ownership
- Owner: Audacy, Inc. (Sale to Hoffman Media Group pending.); (Audacy License, LLC)
- Sister stations: KEZK-FM; KFTK-FM; KMOX; KYKY; WFUN-FM

History
- First air date: October 16, 1967
- Former call signs: WJBM-FM (1967–1985); WKKX (1985–1994); WKBQ-FM (1994–1997); WALC (1997–1998); WXTM-FM (1998–2000); WMLL (2000–2004); WRDA (2004–2005); WHHL (2005–2025)
- Call sign meaning: Carried over from KMOX

Technical information
- Licensing authority: FCC
- Facility ID: 74578
- Class: C2
- ERP: 50,000 watts
- HAAT: 140 meters (460 ft)
- Transmitter coordinates: 38.652°N 90.284°W

Links
- Public license information: Public file; LMS
- Webcast: Listen live (via Audacy)
- Website: www.audacy.com/kmox

KMOX-FM (104.1 FM) is a commercial radio station licensed to Hazelwood, Missouri, United States, and serves the Greater St. Louis area with a talk radio format as a simulcast of KMOX (1120 AM). Owned by Audacy, Inc., KMOX-FM's studios are located in downtown St. Louis and the transmitter is adjacent to Crossroads College Preparatory School in St. Louis. In addition to a standard analog transmission, KMOX-FM is available online via Audacy.

== History ==
=== Jerseyville era (1967–1985) ===
The station signed on in 1967, licensed to Jerseyville, Illinois, as WJBM-FM, airing a full service format featuring country music as a sister station to WJBM (1480 AM), and a transmitter located north of that community. For its first few years of existence, its reach was limited to the same rural area as their AM partner, with any efforts to market to St. Louis merely coincidental and involving radio advertising targeted across the region.

=== Moving into St. Louis (1985–1997) ===
The station was sold to Shelley Davis' Gateway Radio Partners (GRP) in 1985 without the AM station, and its new owners began to target St. Louis and the northern portion of Metro East, continuing to air country music, now as WKKX. Even with a move of its tower site into the Missouri side of the metro in Florissant, the move-in station struggled against entrenched country competition, and "Kix 104" was unsuccessful, with GRP going bankrupt and Zimmer Broadcasting purchasing the station in July 1991. Two years later, Zimmer then purchased WKBQ-FM 106.5, a move-in station itself.

On January 20, 1994, the programming and call letters of 104.1 FM would be swapped with that of 106.5 FM; WKBQ-FM, now on 104.1, would become "Q104" and assume 106.5's former Top 40/CHR format. For the next year, the station also continued a simulcast on WKBQ (1380 AM) until that station assumed a talk format.

WKBQ-FM became the FM home for St. Louis morning team Steve & DC after one of the most significant stories/controversies in St. Louis radio history in the summer of 1993. The duo announced on January 6, 1994, that they would return on January 20 to "Q104" at a downtown press conference which received live coverage on television and in local publications.

=== Emmis era (1996–2005) ===
With the Telecommunications Act of 1996 de-regulating the radio industry and expanding the number of stations that could be owned in one market, Emmis Communications purchased WKBQ-FM and WKKX for $42.5 million, with immediate changes for both stations coming after the holidays. WKBQ's Top 40/CHR format was dropped for modern AC as WALC, "Alice 104.1", on January 24, 1997, inspired by the successful and similarly named station in San Francisco.
Compared to WKKX, which remained under the same format until being sold in 2000 to Bonneville International, the programming on 104.1 was in constant flux, as Emmis attempted to find a proper format for the station that would draw ratings. WALC flipped to active rock as "Extreme Radio 104.1" on June 25, 1998, with new WXTM-FM call letters taking effect on July 15. WXTM was the original St. Louis affiliate of The Howard Stern Show.

On September 24, 2000, at 2 p.m., after playing "Fade to Black" by Metallica, and after Emmis purchased KPNT (and moved Stern to that station), WXTM flipped to 1980s music as WMLL. Branded as "The Mall", the branding was a reference to the downtown Gateway Mall green space. The format would later evolve to encompass 1990s music, and would be the home of popular morning DJs Steve & DC."WMLL 104.1 Jerseyville, IL St. Louis, MO 2000 2002".

WMLL began stunting with Christmas music on November 20, 2003; on December 25, the stunting changed to a "wheel of formats" by playing music from any given genre, as well as old airchecks from throughout 104.1's history.

At noon on January 8, 2004, the stunting stopped and the station flipped to an adult standards format as WRDA, "Red @ 104.1". The first songs on "Red" were "My Kind of Town" and "The Lady is a Tramp", both by Frank Sinatra. The station specialized in "Music with Class" as they called it, playing classic standards singers such as Frank Sinatra, Dean Martin and Bobby Darin, along with more modern 'crooners' such as Rod Stewart and Michael Bublé. The format, unusual for a major-market FM station and driven entirely by the swing revival fad of the time which had already begun to peter out, had little revenue and listenership and as the fad faded, its remaining older demographic immediately made the station non-viable long-term.

=== Radio One/Hot 104.1 era (2005–2025) ===
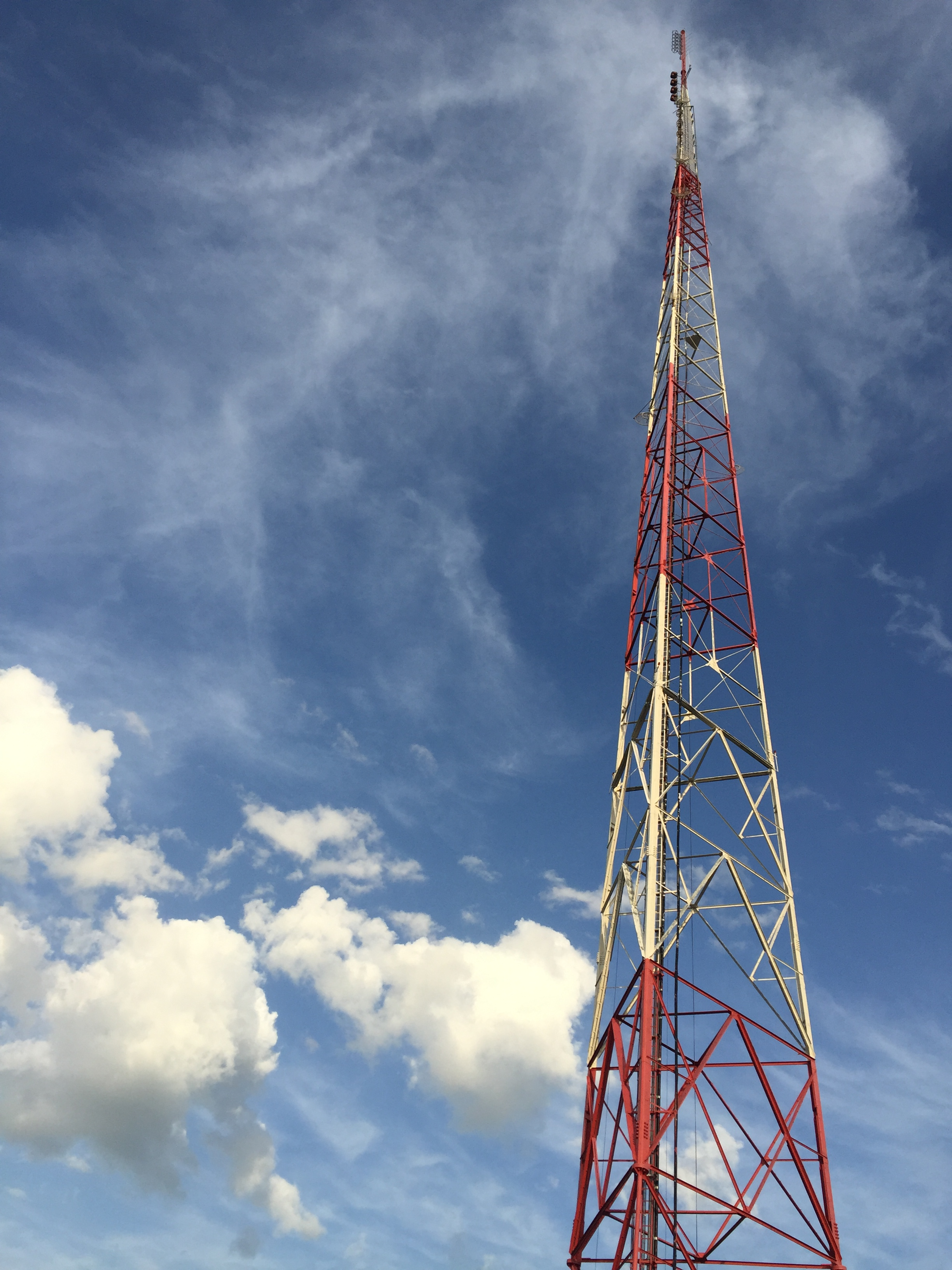
KMOX-FM transmitting tower

Emmis began the process of selling WRDA to Radio One, for $20 million in the latter part of September 2005. The station flipped to urban contemporary format as "Hot 104.1" on October 1, 2005, with Radio One immediately assuming operations of the station under a temporary local marketing agreement. The call letters would change to WHHL on November 24, 2005. Radio One would take full possession of the station in 2006, and soon began the process of moving the station towards the central part of the market. By 2008, WHHL's transmitter was moved to atop an outbuilding of Crossroads College Preparatory School just north of Forest Park, and the station changed their city of license from Jerseyville to Hazelwood.

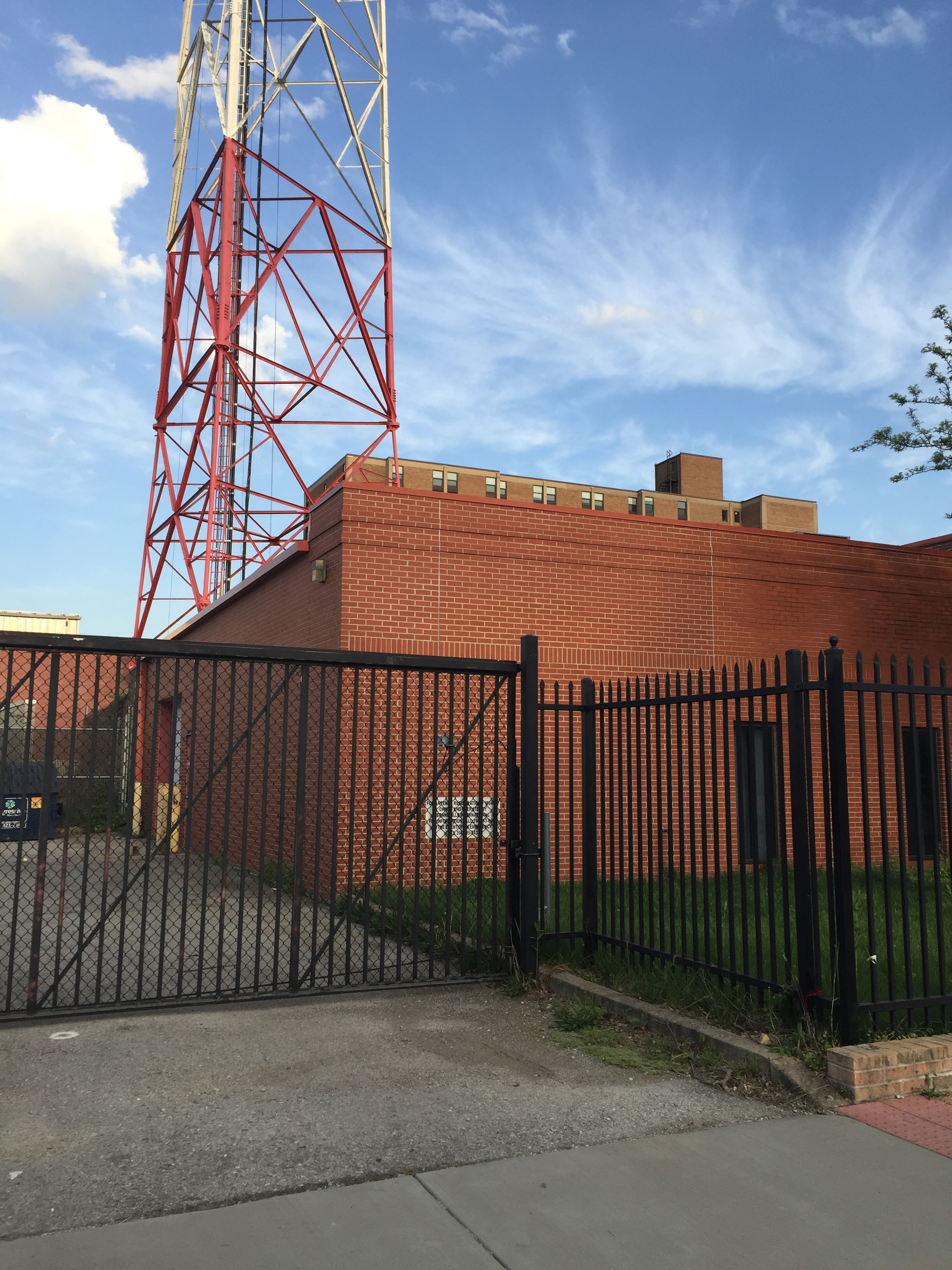
KMOX-FM transmitter building

On November 5, 2020, Urban One announced that it would swap WHHL, the intellectual property of WFUN-FM, and two other stations in Philadelphia and Washington, D.C. to Entercom (which has since been renamed as Audacy), in exchange for its stations in Charlotte, North Carolina. Entercom took over the station under a local marketing agreement on November 23. The swap was consummated on April 20, 2021. Audacy retained the format and personnel of the station unchanged for four years after its acquisition.

=== KMOX news/talk simulcast (2025–present) ===
On March 6, 2025, as part of a company-wide series of layoffs at Audacy, the entire "Hot" airstaff was dismissed, and the station began to run fully automated. Multiple news outlets began reporting that WHHL would soon begin simulcasting KMOX, with the timing of the move scheduled to be held ahead of the start of the 2025 season of the St. Louis Cardinals, for whom KMOX is the flagship station. Such a move would provide KMOX a full-power FM signal throughout the St. Louis metropolitan area for the first time since the late 1960s, when the original KMOX-FM (now the separately-owned KLOU) diverged from simulcasting the AM station due to new FCC policies at the time encouraging unique FM programming.

The move was officially confirmed by Audacy on March 10. The station changed its call letters to KMOX-FM on March 24. The former WHHL/"Hot" hip-hop format moved to KEZK-FM's second HD Radio subchannel, which is simulcast in analog form via K254CR (98.7 FM), an FM translator formerly used to simulcast KMOX. From then on, Audacy has promoted KMOX's FM presence over that of the 1120 frequency as 104.1 KMOX outside station identifications.

On June 29, 2026, Audacy announced the sale of its St. Louis stations, including KMOX-FM, to Hoffman Media Group.

== Programming ==
Weekdays on KMOX-AM-FM begin with an all-news wake-up show, Total Information AM, anchored by Debbie Monterrey and Tom Ackerman. The program provides "Traffic and Weather Together" every ten minutes and news updates from the KMOX team and ABC News Radio. There is also a news-sharing agreement with KMOV channel 4. (KMOV and KMOX were both owned by CBS from 1958 to 1986.) The rest of the weekday daytime schedule features local talk programs with The Chris and Amy Show (Chris Rongey and Amy Marxkors) in late mornings and The Dave Glover Show in afternoon drive time. Sports shows are heard at noon and in the evening. The station switches to nationally syndicated talk shows at night including Our American Stories with Lee Habeeb and The Other Side of Midnight with Lionel. America in the Morning is heard before sunrise.

KMOX-AM-FM are the flagship stations for St. Louis Cardinals baseball. The stations have extensive pre- and post-game broadcasts surrounding each Cardinals game. Sports shows are heard on weekday evenings and on Sundays. Weekends feature specialty shows on money, health, gardening, veterans and home repair, some of which are paid brokered programming. Saturday and Sunday mornings also have Total Information AM news blocks. And Saturday overnights feature Old Time Radio shows.
