= KNGN =

Radio station in McCook, Nebraska

- McCook, Nebraska; United States
- Frequency: 1360 kHz

Programming
- Format: Religious

Ownership
- Owner: My Bridge

History
- First air date: June 23, 1961
- Former call signs: KWRV (1961–1966); KICX (1966–1990)
- Call sign meaning: Kansas Nebraska Good News

Technical information
- Licensing authority: FCC
- Facility ID: 65925
- Class: D
- Power: 1,000 watts day
- Transmitter coordinates: 40°11′45″N 100°41′57″W
- Translators: K252FV (98.3 MHz, McCook)

Links
- Public license information: Public file; LMS
- Website: http://www.kngn.org/

KNGN (1360 AM) is a radio station broadcasting a religious music format. It is licensed to McCook, Nebraska and owned by My Bridge.

== History ==
=== Secular programming ===
KWRV signed on the air on June 23, 1961. It was owned by the Regional Broadcasting Corporation and maintained studios on Norris Street in McCook. KWRV was knocked off the air for two hours one day in May 1962 when a snake pursued a mouse into its transmitter.

KWRV was sold in 1966 to Semeco Broadcasting Corporation—named for principals Walter E. Sehnert, Vernon A. Meints, and KWRV general sales manager W. O. Corrick—for $91,000. The new owners changed the station's call letters to KICX effective May 19, 1966. The station maintained a middle-of-the-road music format and affiliations with the ABC Information and Intermountain networks. KICX's programming began to be simulcast on KICX-FM 95.9 when that station signed on January 31, 1979.

=== Change to religion ===
Semeco, now owned by Corrick's estate, sold KICX-AM-FM to Ron Crowe and Associates for $200,000 in 1989. In order to buy another McCook station, KSWN, Crowe had to spin off a station, and he chose to donate KICX AM to the Lutheran Church–Missouri Synod. The station relaunched as KNGN, for "Kansas Nebraska Good News", on April 8, 1990. Locally, the station was operated by Peace Lutheran Church and relied heavily on programming from the synod's KFUO in St. Louis.

However, as time went on, the synod could no longer afford to continue running the station. As a result, in 2001, the station's license was transferred to the locally based Kansas Nebraska Good News Broadcasting Corporation. The station also relocated from its original studios at Peace Lutheran to a larger facility at a former country school in McCook.

In 2018, the station added an FM translator, K252FV on 98.3 MHz. The new translator enabled the station to go 24-hours for the first time in its history.

On August 2, 2022, the station's owners filed to transfer the broadcast license to MyBridge Radio. The sale, which included translator K252FV, was consummated on May 22, 2023 at a price of $40,000.
