= Mama's Pride (album) =

1975 studio album by Mama's Pride

Studio album by Mama's Pride
- Released: January 1, 1975
- Recorded: 1974
- Genre: Southern rock; blues rock; rock
- Label: Atco; Atlantic
- Producer: Arif Mardin

Mama's Pride chronology
Mama's Pride (1975)	Uptown & Lowdown (1977)

Mama's Pride is the debut studio album by American rock band Mama's Pride. It was released on January 1, 1975, by Atco Records, a division of Atlantic Records at the time, now a division of Warner Brothers. The album was produced by Arif Mardin. Although a commercial failure, the album spawned the band's signature song "Blue Mist", which gained popularity amongst the locals and radio stations of St. Louis, the band's home city.

== Track listing ==
All tracks are written by Danny and Pat Liston, unless noted otherwise

No.	Title	Writer(s)	Length
1.	"In the Morning"	Danny Liston, Max Baker	5:08
2.	"Who Do You Think You're Foolin'"	Danny Liston, Frank Gagliano, Joe Turek	3:27
3.	"Blue Mist"	Pat Liston	4:03
4.	"Laurie Ann"	Pat Liston	4:21
5.	"Missouri Skyline"	Danny Liston, Kevin Saunders, Max Baker, Pat Liston	4:06
6.	"Ole St. Lou"	Danny Liston, Joe Turek, Kevin Saunders, Max Baker, Pat Liston	6:09
7.	"Kind Lovin' Woman"	Danny Liston, Max Baker	4:33
8.	"Where Would You Be"	Pat Liston	6:21
9.	"Young and Free"	Pat Liston	3:43

== Personnel ==
Ref:

=== Mama's Pride ===
- Danny Liston – vocals, guitar
- Pat Liston – vocals, guitar, slide guitar, organ
- Max Baker – guitar, 12-string acoustic guitar, backing vocals
- Frank Gagliano – keyboards
- Kevin Saunders – drums, percussion, backing vocals
- Joe Turek – bass, backing vocals

=== Production ===
- Arif Mardin – producer
- Karl Richardson – engineer
- Gerry Block, Steve Gursky – assistant engineer
- Lew Hahn – re-mixing
- Walden And Brusco, Inc. – management
- Frank Moscati – photography
- Bob Defrin – art direction
