= KEZK-FM =

Adult contemporary radio station in St. Louis

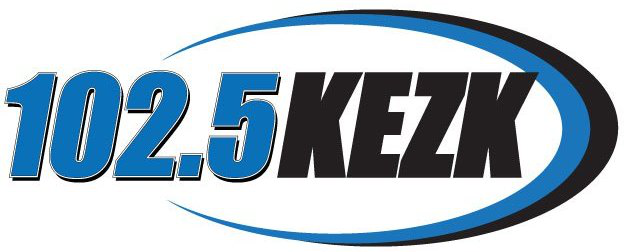
- St. Louis, Missouri; United States
- Broadcast area: Greater St. Louis
- Frequency: 102.5 MHz (HD Radio)
- Branding: 102.5 KEZK

Programming
- Language: English
- Format: Adult contemporary
- Subchannels: HD2: Urban contemporary; HD3: Channel Q
- Affiliations: Premiere Networks

Ownership
- Owner: Audacy, Inc. (Sale to Hoffman Media Group pending.); (Audacy License, LLC)
- Sister stations: KFTK-FM; KMOX; KMOX-FM; KYKY; WFUN-FM

History
- First air date: February 8, 1969
- Former call signs: KDNA (1969–1973)
- Call sign meaning: "Easy" (former format)

Technical information
- Licensing authority: FCC
- Facility ID: 13507
- Class: C0
- ERP: 100,000 watts
- HAAT: 309 m (1,014 ft)
- Transmitter coordinates: 38°34′27.9″N 90°19′31.9″W
- Translator: HD2: 98.7 K254CR (St. Louis)

Links
- Public license information: Public file; LMS
- Webcast: Listen live (via Audacy); HD2: Listen live (via Audacy)
- Website: audacy.com/kezk; HD2: audacy.com/hot987

KEZK-FM (102.5 FM) is a commercial radio station licensed to St. Louis, Missouri, United States. Owned by Audacy, Inc., it airs an adult contemporary format, with studios on Olive Street in downtown St. Louis and transmitter in Shrewsbury. In addition to a standard analog transmission, KEZK broadcasts in HD Radio and is available online via Audacy.

== History ==
=== KDNA and easy listening ===
The 102.5 frequency in St. Louis had originally been the home of listener-supported free form KDNA from 1969 to 1972. KDNA was a non-commercial station, supported by listener donations, yet it broadcast on a commercial frequency. In 1972, it relocated to the non-commercial part of the FM dial, and became KDHX at 88.1 MHz.

Heftel Broadcasting paid for the frequency, and in June 1973, it put KEZK on the air. KEZK carried a beautiful music format and its call sign reflected that format with the EZ call letters, referring to easy listening. It was among St. Louis' highest rated FM stations in the 1970s and 1980s. By the mid-1980s, however, listeners interested in the beautiful music format were beginning to age and most advertisers were seeking a younger audience. In response, KEZK began adding more vocals to its mostly instrumental playlist.

=== Soft AC ===
On January 1, 1991, KEZK completed the transition to a soft adult contemporary format, playing music mostly from the 1970s and 1980s as well as some current soft hits. Through the early 2000s, KEZK moved to a mainstream adult contemporary music format.

In 1996 ownership changed from EZ Broadcasting to American Radio Systems Corporation and Pat McMahon replaced Bob Burch as Program Director. At the time, the morning show anchored by St. Louis radio veteran Ed Goodman and co hosted my Mary Phelan, were the top rated FM radio morning show in the market. Jeff Kapugi became KEZK's Program Director in November 2010, replacing Mark Edwards. The next program director was Cat Thomas.

=== Fresh 102.5 ===
On December 27, 2010, the station rebranded from "Soft Rock 102.5 KEZK" to "Fresh 102.5" adopting the brand used on sister CBS Radio stations WWFS New York City, WCFS-FM Chicago and WIAD Washington, D.C.

However, while those three stations had playlists more closely resembling hot adult contemporary stations, KEZK continued to feature 1970s artists such as Billy Joel and Chicago. The name "Fresh" was more of a rebranding than a format change, as sister station KYKY already features a hot AC format.

=== Today's Hits & Yesterday's Favorites ===
On May 26, 2015, at 7:05 a.m., after stunting the prior weekend with 1980s music (ending with "Kokomo" by The Beach Boys), KEZK dropped the "Fresh" handle, rebranding as "102.5 KEZK, Today's Hits and Yesterday's Favorites." The first song after the relaunch was "P.Y.T." by Michael Jackson. While many AC stations have moved more contemporary, KEZK continues to play artists from the 1980s, such as Michael Jackson, Madonna, Billy Joel and Hall & Oates.

After the annual Christmas music programing concluded at the end of 2020, while using the slogan "All Your Favorites From the 80s and Today," the station shifted to a playlist with little to no recurrent music, and heavy emphasis on the 1980s and to a lesser extent, the 2000s. KEZK also plays songs from the 1970s, 1990s, and 2010s.

On February 2, 2017, CBS Radio announced it would merge with Entercom. The merger was approved on November 9, 2017, and was consummated on November 17.

On June 29, 2026, Audacy announced the sale of KEZK and its sister stations to Hoffman Media Group.

== Programming ==
=== Christmas music ===
KEZK has been "St. Louis’ Official Christmas Station" since 2003. They switch to Christmas music during the second week of November, and air Christmas music until December 25, when the station usually plays 36 hours of commercial-free Christmas music from noon on Christmas Eve until midnight on December 25. KEZK also played Christmas music in late March until early April 2020 during the first few weeks of the COVID-19 pandemic quarantines, calling it “Christmas In March”.

=== HD Radio ===
KEZK-FM's HD2 channel carries an urban contemporary format as "Hot 98.7", reflecting its simulcast on FM translator K254CR (98.7 FM). Prior to March 24, 2025, the HD2 channel and K254CR simulcast KMOX; the change to "Hot" was a format swap with WHHL (104.1 FM), which became KMOX-FM.

Broadcast translator for KEZK-FM HD2
Call sign	Frequency	City of license	FID	ERP (W)	HAAT	Class	Transmitter coordinates	FCC info	Notes
K254CR	98.7 FM	St. Louis, Missouri	138424	250	162 m (531 ft)	D	38°36′47.2″N 90°20′9.4″W	LMS	Previously assigned to rebroadcast KFTK (1490 AM); reassigned to KFTK-FM and then KMOX after KFTK (AM)'s license was cancelled by the FCC, and KEZK-FM HD2 after KMOX began simulcasting on KMOX-FM.

== Awards ==
In 2007, the station was nominated for the top 25 markets Adult Contemporary station of the year award by Radio & Records magazine. Other nominees included WMJX in Boston, KOST in Los Angeles; WALK-FM in Nassau, New York; WLTW in New York City; and WBEB in Philadelphia.
