= KYKY =

- St. Louis, Missouri; United States
- Broadcast area: Greater St. Louis
- Frequency: 98.1 MHz (HD Radio)
- Branding: Y98

Programming
- Language: English
- Format: Hot adult contemporary

Ownership
- Owner: Audacy, Inc. (Sale to Hoffman Media Group pending.); (Audacy License, LLC)
- Sister stations: KEZK-FM; KFTK-FM; KMOX; KMOX-FM; WFUN-FM

History
- First air date: April 2, 1960
- Former call signs: KSTL-FM (1960–1967); KRCH (1967–1972); KSLQ (1972–1982)

Technical information
- Licensing authority: FCC
- Facility ID: 20358
- Class: C1
- ERP: 90,000 watts
- HAAT: 309 meters (1,014 ft)
- Transmitter coordinates: 38.5734°N 90.3251°W

Links
- Public license information: Public file; LMS
- Webcast: Listen live (via Audacy)
- Website: www.audacy.com/y98

KYKY (98.1 FM) is a commercial radio station in St. Louis, Missouri, serving the Greater St. Louis region of Missouri and Illinois. KYKY airs a hot adult contemporary radio format and is owned by Audacy, Inc. KYKY operates from offices and studios located on Olive Street in Downtown St. Louis. Its transmitter is on a TV/FM radio tower off Mackenzie Road in Shrewsbury.

KYKY broadcasts using the HD Radio technology.

== History ==
On April 2, 1960, KSTL-FM first signed on as the FM counterpart to daytime-only KSTL (690 AM), owned by Radio St. Louis, Inc.

In 1972, the station was purchased by Bartell Media Corporation, the owner of legendary AM Top 40 stations KCBQ in San Diego and WOKY in Milwaukee, and was enjoying high ratings with WDRQ in Detroit as more people were tuning to FM stations for contemporary hits in the 1970s. Bartell turned KRCH into Top 40 outlet KSLQ. Around 1981, KSLQ adjusted its format to adult contemporary. In October 1982, the call letters were changed to the current KYKY, and rebranded as "KY98", which would later change to "Y98". In 1985, KYKY was purchased by EZ Communications, and evolved the format to hot AC.

On February 2, 2017, CBS Radio announced it would merge with Entercom. The merger was approved on November 9, 2017, and consummated on November 17.

Beginning in 2023, KYKY aired a replay of Kansas City sister station KZPT's morning show (Ponch & Nikki) in afternoon drive. The next year, KZPT would begin airing KYKY's morning show (Bret Mega) on delay in the afternoons. In March 2025, Ponch & Nikki departed both stations as part of Audacy corporate layoffs. The Bret Mega show also began airing on Audacy stations WTDY-FM in Philadelphia and KFBZ in Wichita.

On June 29, 2026, Audacy announced the sale of KYKY and its sister stations to Hoffman Media Group.
