= KXFN =

Radio station in St. Louis

Simulcasts KFUO, Clayton, MO
- St. Louis, Missouri; United States
- Broadcast area: Greater St. Louis
- Frequency: 1380 kHz

Programming
- Format: Christian

Ownership
- Owner: Lutheran Church–Missouri Synod
- Sister stations: KFUO

History
- First air date: 1925
- Former call signs: KFVE (1925–1927); KWK (1927–1984); KGLD (1984–1992); KASP (1992–1994); WKBQ (1994–1995); KRAM (1995–1996); WKBQ (1996–1998); KKWK (1998); KZJZ (1998–1999); KSLG (1999–2012)
- Call sign meaning: Former "Fan" branding

Technical information
- Licensing authority: FCC
- Facility ID: 74579
- Class: B
- Power: 2,000 watts (day); 1,000 watts (night)
- Transmitter coordinates: 38°31′26″N 90°14′17.8″W
- Translator: 105.3 K287BY (St. Louis)

Links
- Public license information: Public file; LMS
- Webcast: Listen live
- Website: kfuo.org

KXFN (1380 AM) is a radio station licensed to St. Louis, Missouri, United States. It is owned by the Lutheran Church – Missouri Synod and airs sacred music as a simulcast of KFUO in Clayton, Missouri. The station has a colorful history as the Top 40 station KWK.

The transmitter site is located near Dupo, Illinois.

== History ==
The station is among the oldest in St. Louis. It began broadcasting in 1925 as KFVE, licensed to the Film Corporation of America in St. Louis. In November 1927, it adopted what would be its most famous call sign, KWK. At first, KWK was an affiliate of the NBC Blue Network.

KWK was owned by Thomas Patrick and had its offices and studios in The Chase Park Plaza Hotel. The station opened an FM counterpart on 99.1 in September 1946. It later closed its operations in April 1950 due to a lack of FM acceptance at the time. Later, it was the Mutual Broadcasting System affiliate in St. Louis until August 1969, when the station switched from adult standards to an R&B format that featured Bill Bailey, Bernie Hayes, and Don Sainte-Johnn. Sainte-Johnn eventually joined KFRC in San Francisco.

KWK's claim to national fame was a film clip in which a disc jockey at the station is seen smashing one of Elvis Presley's records and declaring "Rock and roll has got to go!" It was a clear sign that KWK had veered away from the rock format. This clip can be seen in the 1981 film This Is Elvis.

On July 31, 1973, the station went off the air until November 1, 1978, when it returned as a Top 40 station, and in March 1979, it began simulcasting with its sister station WWWK (106.5 FM). In June 1984, KWK became KGLD, and flipped to oldies. The call letters stood for "Gold".

On January 1, 1992, KGLD changed to all-sports radio KASP. The station went back to simulcasting with WKBQ-FM (the former WWWK) in 1993. (WKBQ-FM would swap frequencies with WKKX (104.1 FM) in January 1994.) In December 1994, the station flipped to hot talk as "Straight Talk 1380". Programming on "Straight Talk" included Steve & DC in mornings (simulcast with WKBQ-FM), The Fabulous Sports Babe, Ken Hamblin, Tom Leykis, and Jim Bohannon.

On February 22, 1995, the station changed its call sign to KRAM, shortly after the Los Angeles Rams football team announced that they would relocate to St. Louis. On March 21, 1996, 1380 AM returned to simulcasting WKBQ-FM, switching its call sign to WKBQ. That November, Emmis Communications bought it in a deal with WKBQ-FM and WKKX. Emmis donated the station to a ministry, which changed the call sign to KKWK on February 16, 1998, and flipped the station to a short lived urban talk format.

KKWK switched to a jazz format with new KZJZ call sign adopted on September 1, 1998. KZJZ played mostly classic jazz, had a full-time air staff, and won a Marconi Award.

Having low advertising revenues, the station switched to a satellite-run southern gospel format as KSLG in November 1999. KSLG switched back to sports in 2004, initially carrying Sporting News Radio programming, and later switched to ESPN Radio. On December 3, 2007, KSLG switched affiliations from ESPN to Fox Sports Radio and rebranded as "Team 1380".

On July 1, 2010, Grand Slam Sports, owner of fellow St. Louis sports station KFNS, announced its intention to purchase KSLG pending Federal Communications Commission (FCC) approval. It began managing the station immediately under a local marketing agreement. This resulted in the return of the syndicated Jim Rome Show to the St. Louis market after an absence of approximately a year. On June 20, 2012, KSLG changed its call sign to KXFN with the FN referring to "Fan", similar to now co-owned KFNS.

Citing increased competition and declining ratings, KXFN changed its format in May 2013 to a female-oriented talk format, branded as "1380 The Woman". Concurrently, KFNS switched to a male-focused hot talk/comedy format as "590 The Man".

Less than ten months later, KXFN dropped its talk format to carry Yahoo! Sports Radio. On April 1, 2014, it assumed much of KFNS's hot talk format and airstaff as "1380 The X, Xtreme Talk Radio". KFNS itself reverted to sports, but retained the "Man" nickname. For several months, KFNS and KXFN staffers were publicly critical of station management. There was on-air sparring between hosts, and even a physical altercation between KFNS' morning host and the station manager (who subsequently resigned).

On October 1, 2014, KXFN changed to a music/talk format with multiple styles of shows, offering music of different genres as well as comedy talk content. That lasted until the following March, when TalkSTL.com began leasing the airtime on KXFN, once again restoring the previous sports talk format. By that December, TalkSTL.com's parent company, Markel Radio Group, bought and began programming KFNS, which had fallen silent the previous November after Grand Slam Sports went into bankruptcy. Markel then relaunched a new version of "590 The Fan", moving some of the staff and programming over from KXFN. After a brief simulcast on both stations, KXFN fell silent on December 19, 2015.

On August 1, 2016, the Salem Media Group announced the $190,000 purchase of KXFN through Grand Slam Sports bankruptcy receiver Detalus Consulting, pairing it with the recently purchased and relaunched WSDZ. Salem was able to secure FM translators for KXFN and WSDZ as part of the FCC's AM Revitalization Translator Waiver Period.

The Pulse's logo

On January 6, 2017, KXFN returned to the air and launched a health and wellness talk format, branded as "1380 The Pulse". The health talk format lasted less than a year. On October 16, 2017, KXFN changed to conservative talk, branded as "The Answer". WSDZ, which had been carrying Salem's conservative talk line-up, simultaneously flipped to urban gospel.

On November 14, 2019, the station was sold to Immaculate Heart Media, Inc., and adopted Relevant Radio's Spanish language programming.

On February 6, 2023, the Lutheran Church – Missouri Synod purchased KXFN from Relevant Radio for $570,000 and changed programming to sacred music. On April 2, 2026, the FCC granted a license to cover moving transmission of the station's daytime signal to the nighttime signal transmitter site.
