= KFUO (AM) =

Radio station in Clayton, Missouri, United States

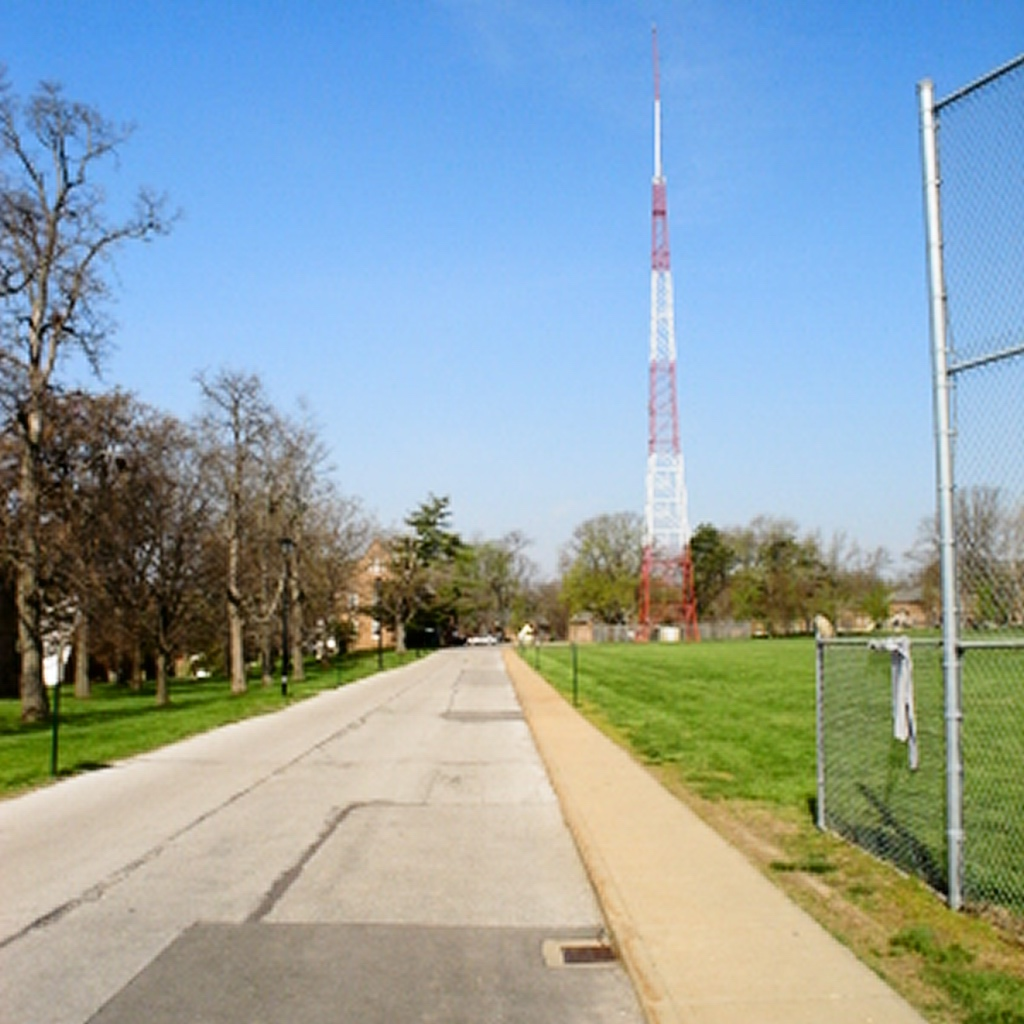
- KFUO tower and studios on the campus of Concordia Seminary, April 2007
- Clayton, Missouri; United States
- Broadcast area: Greater St. Louis
- Frequency: 850 kHz (HD Radio)

Programming
- Format: Christian radio

Ownership
- Owner: Lutheran Church – Missouri Synod
- Sister stations: KXFN

History
- First air date: October 26, 1924
- Former frequencies: 550 kHz; 830 kHz
- Call sign meaning: randomly assigned, adopted the slogan "Keep Forward Upward Onward"

Technical information
- Licensing authority: FCC
- Facility ID: 39258
- Class: D
- Power: 3,800 watts (daytime only)
- Transmitter coordinates: 38°31′27.2″N 90°14′21.5″W
- Translators: 92.7 K224FT (St. Louis); 104.5 K283CI (St. Louis); 105.3 K87BY (St. Louis)

Links
- Public license information: Public file; LMS
- Website: www.kfuo.org

KFUO (850 kHz) is a non-commercial radio station licensed to Clayton, Missouri, and serving Greater St. Louis. It has a Christian radio format. Owned and operated by The Lutheran Church – Missouri Synod (LCMS), its radio studios and offices are in the LCMS headquarters in Kirkwood, Missouri.

KFUO is a daytimer station and signs off at sunset, with its operation limited by the primary Class A station on 850 kHz, KOA in Denver. KFUO's daytime-only operation means its on-air hours vary depending on time of year, and the station broadcasts between 80 1/2 and 102 1/2 hours per week, depending on the times of sunrise and sunset in Denver. KFUO's power is 3,800 watts, using one of the towers of sister station KXFN's nighttime transmitter site in Dupo, Illinois. KFUO formerly was powered at 5,000 watts, from a transmitter site on the grounds of the Concordia Seminary in Clayton.

The station's FM translators at 92.7 MHz, 104.5 MHz and 105.3 MHz, relay station KFUO and streaming at kfuo.org, play sacred music when the 850 signal is off the air.

KFUO broadcasts using HD Radio technology.

== Programming ==
KFUO is the oldest continuously operating Christian radio station in the United States, with its first broadcast on October 26, 1924. The LCMS subsidizes the station as needed. The station accepts pledges from businesses, individuals, congregations, and organizations which go directly to the station's owner, the Lutheran Church–Missouri Synod. KFUO derives only limited revenue from sponsorship messages and retains its non-commercial status.

Programming includes Bible studies (e.g., Thy Strong Word), theological and social commentary (e.g., Law and Gospel and Issues, Etc.), and Christian lifestyle shows such as The Coffee Hour and Midday Moments. Several hours a day are devoted to Lutheran sacred music, which is also available on the website when the AM station is off the air during the night.

The station broadcasts a total of four Lutheran church services each weekend. They are heard late Saturday afternoon, two on Sunday morning and one heard late Sunday afternoon.

== History ==
=== Fundraising ===
The station's establishment began with a February 19, 1923, meeting of the Board of Control of Concordia Seminary, when board chairman Richard Kretzschmar urged that a radio station be built at either the seminary or at Concordia Publishing House. This proposal was presented to the board of directors of the Lutheran Laymen's League, which agreed to financially support the effort, with an initial pledge of $2,285. Students at the seminary raised $1,500 from friends and families, and also allocated $1,000 from the student treasury. The St. Louis Lutheran Publicity Association promised $1,000 for annual maintenance. In total, $7,000 was raised by the end of May 1923.

Since the project was estimated to cost $14,000, the seminary board asked the Walther League (the young adult organization of the LCMS) for assistance. The Walther League agreed to raise the remaining $7,000. A "radio committee" that included John H. C. Fritz, dean of the seminary, and Walter A. Maier, executive secretary of the Walther League, was formed to oversee the project.

=== Sign on ===
Construction was begun at the seminary, then located on South Jefferson Avenue in St. Louis. The station went on air for the first time on October 26, 1924, covering the cornerstone laying for the new seminary being constructed in Clayton. The control room and studio for the 500-watt transmitter were located in the attic in December 1924. The station license was issued to Concordia College in St. Louis, with the call letters KFUO, which were randomly assigned from an alphabetical roster of available call signs.

The station was formally dedicated and began regular broadcasting on December 14, 1924.

=== Early programming ===
Initially the station shared 550 kHz with station KSD (now KTRS), owned by the St. Louis Post-Dispatch, and broadcast two programs each week, on Sundays and Wednesdays. In 1927, the Federal Radio Commission moved KFUO to a time share with station KFVE (later KWK) at 1280 kHz, but reversed that decision a month later. That same year the station moved to the new campus of Concordia Seminary in Clayton. The $50,000 cost of the new facilities and 1000-watt transmitter was funded by the Lutheran Laymen's League. The League also agreed to provide $20,000 to $25,000 annually for operations. Under the agreement, which had been accepted by the LCMS convention on June 15, 1926, the station was placed under the authority of the seminary's Board of Control. The new facilities were dedicated, and broadcasting begun, on May 29, 1927.

By 1928 the station was broadcasting 21 hours per week. Under the terms of the shared frequency arrangement with KSD, KSD had 80% of the broadcast time while KFUO had 20%. In 1936, KFUO petitioned the Federal Communications Commission (FCC) to allow it to use 50% of the time and increase its transmitter power to 5,000 watts, and in September of that year KSD petitioned the FCC to move KFUO to a different frequency so that KSD would have exclusive rights to the 550 kHz frequency. While the FCC was considering both petitions, Elzey Roberts, the publisher of the St. Louis Star-Times, offered to buy KFUO for $100,000, but the offer was declined. In March 1938, the FCC denied both petitions. KFUO appealed, but the United States Court of Appeals for the District of Columbia affirmed the decision in 1939.

=== Frequency changes ===
In 1940, KFUO petitioned the FCC to move to daytime-only operation on 830 kHz, and increase its transmitter power to 5,000 watts. The FCC approved the move to 830 kHz on July 1, 1940, and the 5,000-watt power increase on November of that year. But the new transmitter did not become operational until September 1941.

Many stations were required to change frequencies in 1941, with the implementation of the North American Regional Broadcasting Agreement (NARBA). The FCC reassigned KFUO to 850 kHz, where it has remained. The increase in power and broadcast hours required the erection of a new tower and antenna system, installation of the new transmitter, and the renovation and enlargement of the studio.

During this time, KFUO also began broadcasting The Lutheran Hour, which is still heard on over 700 stations worldwide.

In 1953, the LCMS received a construction permit for a non-commercial television station, KFUO-TV, that would operate starting in early 1954 on channel 30. The station never went on the air, and the LCMS surrendered the permit in January 1956 because it had decided that a UHF station was not viable. Channel 30 was later awarded to a different party and went on the air as KDNL-TV on June 8, 1969.

In 1989, the LCMS was given radio station KICX in McCook, Nebraska, and changed its call sign to KNGN on April 8, 1990. The station aired much of the KFUO programming. In 2001, the LCMS decided it could no longer afford to operate the station and transferred its license to the local operators.

On February 6, 2023, the LCMS bought KXFN (1380 AM) for $570,000 from Catholic talk radio network Relevant Radio.

=== FM radio ===
FM station KFUO-FM, originally at 104.1 MHz, began operation in 1948 as a simulcast of the AM station. It later moved to 99.1 MHz. In 1975, due to Federal Communications Commission (FCC) regulations requiring separate programming on FM stations, KFUO-FM switched to broadcasting classical music. But the expense of running both stations was increasing and the LCMS decided to sell the FM outlet.

In March 2010, KFUO-FM was sold to Gateway Creative Broadcasting. On July 7 of that year the station switched to a Contemporary Christian format, known as "Joy 99". It now has the call sign KLJY.

=== FCC charges ===
In 1997, KFUO-AM-FM was investigated by the FCC. The agency charged that the LCMS had violated the FCC's Equal Employment Opportunity requirements by not hiring enough minorities and women and by requiring a knowledge of Lutheran doctrine to be hired by KFUO and KFUO-FM. After losing appeals within the FCC, the LCMS appealed to the United States Court of Appeals for the District of Columbia Circuit. That court found, in Lutheran Church–Missouri Synod v. FCC (1998), that the FCC's requirements were unconstitutional.

Even though the LCMS had prevailed, one negative result of the investigation was the failure of the LCMS's bid to purchase radio station KSLH from the St. Louis Public Schools to simulcast KFUO 24 hours per day. The LCMS had submitted the highest bid for the station, $1 million, in 1993, but the application to transfer the license that it filed in February 1994 was put on hold for 18 months and then cancelled by the FCC while the litigation continued. KSLH was sold to another bidder and is now KSIV-FM.

=== Studios and streaming ===
KFUO began streaming its broadcast on the station's web site, kfuo.org, in 1998. Program archives on the site were spotty until the station began formally archiving its programs in 2003. In 2004, KFUO launched its HD radio station, the first in Missouri.

The studios of KFUO were moved to the LCMS International Center, the denomination's headquarters in Kirkwood, Missouri, on June 24, 2013, to provide modern facilities and to allow easier access to denomination's leaders and organizations. The transmitter remained at Concordia Seminary. At the time of the move, the old studio at the seminary had been the oldest in continuous operation in the United States.

In 2025, the station began transmitting at a reduced power of 1,900 watts from the site of KXFN's nighttime transmitter near Dupo, Illinois. On April 3, 2026, the old tower on the Concordia Seminary campus was demolished. KFUO was later authorized to transmit with a power of 3,800 watts.

== Issues, Etc. controversy ==
During Holy Week 2008 (March 18) the theological talk show, Issues, Etc., was abruptly discontinued from KFUO's program line-up after 15 years on the air. The producer and host of Issues, Etc. were fired with no explanation. The show had also been distributed to Christian radio stations across the U.S. In each city outside the St. Louis area the program was sponsored by local LCMS congregations, not by KFUO or the national LCMS office.

Three weeks after the cancellation, KFUO management issued an official announcement citing programmatic and stewardship (business) reasons as the cause for cancellation. Management claimed that the station was running deficits into the hundreds of thousands of dollars every year, that Issues, Etc. (the most expensive program to produce at KFUO) was contributing significantly to those deficits, and that the LCMS no longer had the ability to subsidize or overcome these shortfalls. There was no way to verify management's claims because the station does not have a policy of making its financial information available to the public.

On April 14, 2008, a group of some 50 to 60 people suspecting ulterior motives for the cancellation held a demonstration at the LCMS International Center. An online petition to reinstate the show collected more than 7,000 signatures.

Issues, Etc. resumed operations as an independent listener-supported broadcast on June 30, 2008, on another St. Louis radio station, KSIV, and through on-line internet streaming at issuesetc.org. Radio stations in five other states now carry the program live, and podcast downloads are distributed through the show's website. In February 2009, the LCMS officially gave up its legal claim to the trademark name "Issues, Etc.", which it had allowed to lapse in 1999. The trademark name is now owned by Lutheran Public Radio, the current production company of Issues, Etc.

On March 13, 2012, Issues, Etc. returned to KFUO in a new arrangement whereby Lutheran Public Radio pays the station for broadcast airtime. The program now maintains complete control of its own financial matters and program content as gained following the 2008 split.

== Translators ==
In the early 2020s, KFUO obtained authorization from the FCC to operate FM translators in the St. Louis area:

- K224FT 92.7 MHz: St. Charles County
- K283CI 104.5 MHz: Metro East, downtown St. Louis, and North St. Louis County
- K287BY 105.3 MHz: Mid-St. Louis County and North Jefferson County

== Former logo ==
Former logo

== Awards ==
In 2000, KFUO won a "Gold Angel" award at the 23rd annual "International Angel Awards" ceremony held in Hollywood, California. The award is the highest honor bestowed by Excellence in Media, a Hollywood-based organization devoted to promoting morality in film, television, video, radio, and print.

== See also ==
- Louis J. Sieck, president of KFUO's board of directors from 1926 to 1943
