= KSHE =

Radio station in Crestwood–St. Louis, Missouri

Coordinates: 38.5734°N 90.3251°W

- Crestwood, Missouri; United States
- Broadcast area: Greater St. Louis
- Frequency: 94.7 MHz (HD Radio)
- Branding: KSHE 95

Programming
- Format: Classic rock
- Subchannels: HD2: "KSHE Klassics” (Deep tracks)
- Affiliations: United Stations Radio Networks

Ownership
- Owner: Hubbard Broadcasting; (St. Louis FCC License Sub, LLC)
- Sister stations: KPNT, WARH, WIL-FM, WXOS

History
- First air date: February 11, 1961
- Call sign meaning: The pronoun she, as the station originally had an airstaff of all women, who were its original target audience

Technical information
- Licensing authority: FCC
- Facility ID: 19523
- Class: C0
- ERP: 100,000 watts
- HAAT: 309 meters (1,014 ft)

Links
- Public license information: Public file; LMS
- Webcast: Listen live
- Website: kshe95.com

KSHE (94.7 FM - styled as K-SHE) is a commercial radio station licensed to Crestwood, Missouri, and serving the Greater St. Louis area. It is owned by Hubbard Broadcasting and it airs a classic rock format, using the slogan "KSHE 95, Real Rock Radio". KSHE is also the oldest rock radio station in the world that is still running. The studios are on Olive Boulevard near Interstate 270 in Creve Coeur.

KSHE is a Class C0 station. It has an effective radiated power (ERP) of 100,000 watts, the maximum for most stations. The transmitter is off MacKenzie Road in Shrewsbury.

== History ==
=== Classical music ===
After working as an engineer for 20 years with the Pulitzer stations KSD and KSD-TV, Ed Ceries invested his life savings and his considerable engineering efforts in constructing his own FM station. He built some of the equipment himself. The station signed on the air on February 11, 1961. The studios were in the basement of the Ceries' home in suburban Crestwood.

The station used the call sign KSHE. Initially it had a classical music format. For a while, all the announcers were women, which was the reason the call letters were chosen to include "SHE." Most of the basement was used for the station operations, with the Associated Press Teletype installed next to the clothes washer. The record library room doubled as an administrative office where Mrs. Ceries also did her ironing.

Listener loyalty was strong. At times, fans would come to the station with copies of classical selections they thought would be a good addition to those owned by KSHE. Advertisers were not convinced FM radio—-particularly classical music-—had much of an audience. After the first year, the format was adjusted to contain about 90% middle of the road (MOR) music and 10% classical, with nine daily news broadcasts. In 1964, the station was sold to Century Broadcasting.

=== Rock music ===
New general manager Howard Grafman hired Harvey Sheldon to change the station's format to rock and roll, with Ron Elz assisting in music selection. The individual disc jockeys were permitted to decide what to play. The first rock song played on KSHE in November 1967, that ushered in their format change was Jefferson Airplane's "White Rabbit". KSHE sometimes played music nonstop for hours without station identification, which eventually was brought to the attention of the Federal Communications Commission (FCC). That triggered a warning to identify as required.

The station would play whole albums in the late afternoon and late at night as a special feature. Albums played in their entirety included The Firesign Theatre's Waiting for the Electrician or Someone Like Him, The Who's Tommy, Bonzo Dog Doo-Dah Band's Gorilla, Arlo Guthrie's Alice's Restaurant, and Iron Butterfly's In-A-Gadda-Da-Vida.

During the 1970s and early 1980s, KSHE helped launch the careers of several midwestern bands such as Styx, Cheap Trick, REO Speedwagon and Head East. KSHE had a playlist, which popularized international rock artists as Lake from Germany, Stingray from South Africa, and rising bands from Australia and New Zealand including Midnight Oil and Split Enz. Starting in the late 1970s and continuing into the present day, Sunday evenings were dedicated to playing seven albums from seven different artists on a show called the Seventh Day. The albums usually were played from 7:00 pm until after midnight.

Instead of the standard reading of news ripped from the Associated Press or United Press International wire machine ("rip and read"), early KSHE newscasts introduced news topics by preceding the story with rock music excerpts that had lyrics introducing or commenting on the topic.

=== Specialty shows ===
During the 1970s and into the 1980s, KSHE had the KSHE Klassics Show with Ruth Hutchinson as the DJ. Ruth was the mother of one of the station personnel and was in her 80s during this run. This 60-90 minute show, airing one night a week, featured songs that KSHE had listed as Klassics, usually deep cuts of somewhat popular bands, songs by bands that were largely unknown outside of the midwest, or songs by bands that had limited to little following in the United States. Among the more obscure KSHE Klassics are "Blue Mist" (Mama's Pride), "Dead and Gone" (Gypsy), "Two Hangmen" (Mason Proffit), "Lake Shore Drive" (Aliotta Haynes Jeremiah), "Last Illusion" (JF Murphy & Salt), "The Martian Boogie" (Brownsville Station), "From a Dry Camel" (Dust), "Rosewood Bitters" (Michael Stanley), "Lady of the Lake" (Starcastle), "Sail On Sail Away" (Moxy) and "Lady Fantasy" (Camel).

From 1996 to 2012, KSHE aired The Bob & Tom Show in morning drive time, syndicated from WFBQ in Indianapolis. The current wake-up program is "The A.D. Show" with A.D. Rowntree and station veteran John Ulett.

KSHE created a virtual museum on its website for its long-time fans. The site contains video clips, audio clips, pictures and memorabilia. The first inductees of the KSHE Museum in 2007 were Rush, Kiss, Ted Nugent, and REO Speedwagon.

At times, KSHE devotes an hour to a genre of rock music. They include Hair Band Doran (DJ: Mike Doran) from 8pm-9pm weekdays (previously called '80s at 8) and Monday Night Metal with Tom "Real Rock" Terbrock on Tuesday nights at 9 p.m. KSHE DJ Lern has "Monday Night Metal," every Monday at 9 p.m. At 5 pm each weekday, KSHE plays "The Daily Dose of Led Zepplin" with Tim Virgin, two Led Zeppelin songs presented with trivia about their creation or notable performances of the songs. The station carries "The Kshe Klassic Show" on Sunday mornings with John Ulett (Uman). He's been full time on the radio station for 47 years and is considered to be the longest running rock DJ in the world. He also co-hosts a show with St. Louis radio legend Mark Klose called Vinyl Exam on Sundays at noon.

=== Mascot ===
The station mascot is a sunglasses-and-headphones-wearing pig named "Sweetmeat." Its likeness originally appeared on the cover of Blodwyn Pig's 1969 album Ahead Rings Out.

Like the pig pictured on the LP cover, Sweetmeat first appeared with a joint in his mouth. This "controversial" detail disappeared in the early 1980s in favor of an updated, cartoon "rocker" pig. In recent years, the station has returned to using the original image, along with the original KSHE-95 text logo.

At top, the cartoon Sweetmeat used in the 1980s; at bottom, "vintage" Sweetmeat used as of June 2013.

Sweetmeat also inspired the name of Austin, Texas Christian punk/thrash band One Bad Pig.
