= WARH =

Radio station in Granite City, Illinois, serving St. Louis, Missouri

- Granite City, Illinois; United States
- Broadcast area: Greater St. Louis
- Frequency: 106.5 MHz (HD Radio)
- Branding: 106.5 The Arch

Programming
- Format: Adult hits
- Subchannels: HD2: Soft adult contemporary "The Breeze"; HD3: 1980s hits "My 80s Mix"

Ownership
- Owner: Hubbard Broadcasting; (St. Louis FCC License Sub, LLC)
- Sister stations: KPNT; KSHE; WIL-FM; WXOS

History
- First air date: November 24, 1965
- Former call signs: WGNU-FM (1965–1979); WWWK (1979–1981); KWK-FM (1981–1987); KWK (1987–1988); WKBQ (1988–1994); WKKX (1994–2000); WSSM (2000–2005)
- Call sign meaning: "The Arch" (referencing the Gateway Arch)

Technical information
- Licensing authority: FCC
- Facility ID: 74577
- Class: C1
- ERP: 90,000 watts
- HAAT: 309 meters (1014 ft)
- Transmitter coordinates: 38.5734°N 90.3251°W

Links
- Public license information: Public file; LMS
- Webcast: Listen live Listen live (HD2)
- Website: www.1065thearch.com

WARH (106.5 FM "106-5 The Arch") is a commercial radio station licensed to Granite City, Illinois and serving Greater St. Louis, including sections of Illinois and Missouri. WARH is owned by Hubbard Broadcasting and airs an adult hits radio format. The station's studios and offices are in Creve Coeur, Missouri (although a St. Louis address is used). Its transmitter is located near Resurrection Cemetery off Mackenzie Road in St. Louis.

The station's name pays tribute to the iconic Gateway Arch monument in Downtown St. Louis. The format is musically similar to the syndicated Jack FM stations in the U.S. and Canada. However, "The Arch" uses a live and local DJ staff around the clock, whereas "Jack" stations are, for the most part, automated with no live voices. WARH uses voice actor Howard Cogan for voice imaging; Cogan was the former voice of the network syndicated version of Jack FM. Formerly, the station's voice imaging was done by John O'Hurley as 'Simon Archer".

WARH broadcasts in the HD Radio format; WARH-HD2 carries a soft adult contemporary, known as "The Breeze". KTMY from Minneapolis, known as "My Talk Radio". The HD2 subchannel previously simulcasted KTMY in Minneapolis, which featured a female-oriented entertainment talk format. Before March 2017, it featured less familiar rock songs from the 1960s to the present, branded as "106-5 The Deep".) WARH-HD3 carries an all-1980s hits format branded as "My 80s Mix"; this launched on WARH-HD3 in May 2021, after being moved from KSHE's HD3 sub-channel.

== History ==
=== Country (1965–1977) ===
On November 24, 1965, WGNU-FM first signed on as the FM counterpart of WGNU (920 AM), under the ownership of Chuck Norman. Both stations simulcast a country music format for Granite City and its surrounding communities.

=== AOR (1979–1986) ===
KWK / StereoWK logo circa 1980.

In 1979, Norman sold the FM station to Doubleday Broadcasting Co., a subsidiary of publisher Doubleday and Company, who would boost the station's signal to cover most of the St. Louis radio market. Doubleday planned to change the call sign to KWK-FM to match its KWK (1380 AM); however, the Federal Communications Commission (FCC) rejected the application in June 1979, ruling that Granite City and St. Louis were not sufficiently adjacent to permit the usage of conforming call signs, and that the usage of a "K" call sign on an Illinois station might cause confusion as to the station's location. In the interim, the station became WWWK on March 17, 1979. Doubleday appealed the decision; on July 6, 1981, the U.S. Court of Appeals ruled against the FCC and allowed the station to become KWK-FM, noting that WGNU-FM had already been authorized to identify as "Granite City–St. Louis" since 1973, and that the FCC had not produced any evidence of confusion in prior instances of a change from a "W" to "K" call sign.

During this period, the station simulcast the album oriented rock (AOR) format of KWK as "Stereo WK". Doubleday sold the stations to Robinson Broadcasting in 1984.

=== Top 40 (1986–1993) ===
The simulcast ended in 1986, with AM 1380 flipping to oldies as KGLD, while KWK-FM moved to a Top 40/CHR format. The stations were sold to Chase Broadcasting in 1986.

In February 1988, KWK (Note: The "-FM" suffix had been dropped in 1987.) changed call letters to WKBQ-FM, and retained the Top 40 format, but would rebrand as "Q106.5". After the market's CHR powerhouse station KHTR dropped its CHR format that November, WKBQ became the only Top 40 station in the market until the launch of KHTK in August 1989. When mid-1989 rolled along, WKBQ briefly went towards a rock-lean, but returned back to a mainstream direction by mid-1990. In September 1991, WKBQ-FM brought the morning team of Steve and DC to St. Louis from Birmingham, Alabama. In 1993, Steve and DC and WKBQ-FM faced controversy over the use of a racial epithet on the air. The following year, they aired an interview with a woman accusing a local broadcaster of harassing her, which may have contributed to his death by suicide in a small plane crash. Also in 1993, WKBQ-FM again was simulcast on AM 1380.

=== Country (1993–2000) ===
In late 1993, WKBQ-FM was purchased by Zimmer Radio Group of Cape Girardeau, Missouri. On January 20, 1994, WKBQ-FM and country-formatted sister station WKKX swapped frequencies, with WKBQ-FM moving to 104.1 FM, and WKKX moving to 106.5 FM (AM 1380 would continue to simulcast WKBQ-FM after the swap). The station became "New Country Kix 106.5", with the popular morning duo Steve and DC heard for the second time on the 106.5 MHz frequency. That led to the team scoring its biggest ratings in St. Louis, as the Steve and DC morning show consistently ranked No. 1 in the all-important Persons 18-49 and Persons 25-54 demographics on WKKX.

In November 1996, Emmis Broadcasting bought the station.

=== Smooth jazz (2000–2005) ===
In 2000, Emmis swapped WKKX to Bonneville International for Los Angeles country music station KZLA. At 12:00 a.m. on October 4, 2000, after the sale to Bonneville closed, WKKX changed call letters to WSSM and adopted a smooth jazz format as "Smooth 106.5" (later "106.5 Smooth Jazz").

=== Adult hits (2005–present) ===
On April 10, 2005, after playing "Thank You" by Euge Groove, the station adopted an adult hits format, branded as "106-5 The Arch". The first song on "The Arch" was "Roll With the Changes" by REO Speedwagon. The call sign was changed to WARH on April 18, 2005. WARH was initially programmed by Jules Riley. The program director since 2019 is Marty Linck, who also serves as the program director for sister station KSHE.

On January 19, 2011, Bonneville announced the sale of WARH, as well as 16 other stations in four markets (St. Louis, Chicago, Cincinnati and Washington, D.C.), to Minneapolis-based Hubbard Broadcasting. The sale was completed on April 29, 2011.
