= Steve and DC =

Radio show, featuring comedy bits, calls and interviews

The Steve and DC Morning Show
- Country of origin: United States
- Home station: WFFN (Tuscaloosa)
- Hosted by: Steve Shannon (Terrence Trawick); DC Chymes (Isaiah Wilhelm)
- Original release: 1991 (WKBQ, St. Louis)
- Website: 953thebear.com/show/the-steve-and-dc-morning-show/

The Steve and DC Morning Show is a radio program that began broadcasting in 1991 on WKBQ-FM (106.5) radio, St. Louis, Missouri. Hosted by radio personalities Steve Shannon (Terrence Trawick) and DC Chymes (Isaiah Wilhelm), the program followed a standard "morning show" format, featuring current news stories, entertainment industry gossip, games, phone shams, current affairs debates and personal stories from the program's staff and their families. After the duo broke up in 2008, they each worked in radio separately; the duo reunited in 2021 on WFFN in Tuscaloosa, Alabama.

== Career ==
Shannon and Chymes met at the University of Alabama. Before introducing The Steve and DC Morning Show in St. Louis in 1991, the duo co-hosted radio shows in Tuscaloosa, Alabama; Birmingham, Alabama; and New Orleans, Louisiana. At its peak, the St. Louis-based show was syndicated in over forty markets nationwide.

In addition to the traditional talk-show format, Shannon and Chymes incorporated a number of outside individuals, including BJ Lange ("the No Limit Honkey") and Emory Deschamps ("the Mad Hoosier"), to pull pranks. Other contributors to the show included intern Kelly Manno (née Sumpter), reporter "Racy" Stacy Carmichael, producer Dan Duffy, news anchor Margie Ellisor, and executive producer Jim Manno.

=== Controversies ===
In 1992, Shannon and Chymes were involved in a highly publicized morning show stunt called "The Wheel of Whoopie," which had several city locations listed on the wheel. The winning couple would take a cell phone, go to that location, and engage in sexual relations, with the audio from the act being broadcast live over the air. Chymes told Kidd Kraddick's "The Morning Mouth" magazine that the audio was mostly "an occasional groan or grunt but mostly it was (things) you had to imagine." The FCC became involved but the station managed to avoid a fine by firing the station's program director (who was in Canada for the World Series and had no knowledge of the stunt) and the show's producer as a show of good faith.

In 1993, Chymes and Shannon were fired by WKBQ (104.1 FM) after using a racial epithet at a black female caller. The incident proceeded from a discussion about why Martin Luther King Jr. had been shot instead of Jessie Jackson, who was also present at King's assassination. After several months and "racial sensitivity" classes, the duo returned to the air.

In March 1994, Chymes and Shannon aired an interview with a woman who was being harassed by a St. Louis weatherman, Bob Richards, after she ended their extramarital affair. The interview aired several times. Though the affair and subsequent harassment was already public knowledge, Richards, who had heard and was reportedly devastated by the interview, committed suicide two days later. Shannon and Chymes were widely condemned by competing media outlets for airing the interview. However, Steve & DC maintained that the woman had the right to have her side of the story be told.

== End of the show ==
On April 23, 2008, Shannon announced he was leaving the show to pursue a career in Birmingham, Alabama, hosting the morning news program on Clear Channel station WERC 960 AM.

Following Shannon's departure from the program, Chymes continued to host the syndicated radio show, renaming it DC and the Family, until 2011.

== Revival ==
In September 2021, Chymes (by then having changed his on-air pseudonym to DC Daniel) joined WFFN in Tuscaloosa, Alabama, where Shannon had been employed since 2016. As part of Daniel's position as Director of Content for WFFN-FM and TownSquare Media Tuscaloosa, he rejoined Shannon on-air, reviving the show in October 2021.
