= WIL-FM =

Country music radio station in St. Louis

- St. Louis, Missouri; United States
- Broadcast area: Greater St. Louis
- Frequency: 92.3 MHz (HD Radio)
- Branding: 92.3 WIL

Programming
- Format: Country
- Subchannels: HD2: Americana; HD3: Oldies

Ownership
- Owner: Hubbard Broadcasting; (St. Louis FCC License Sub, LLC)
- Sister stations: KPNT, KSHE, WARH, WXOS

History
- First air date: July 15, 1962
- Former call signs: WIL-FM (1962–1973); KFMS (1973–1974)
- Call sign meaning: Carried over from the former WIL (1430 AM)

Technical information
- Licensing authority: FCC
- Facility ID: 72390
- Class: C0
- ERP: 100,000 watts
- HAAT: 300 meters (980 ft)
- Translator: HD3: 94.3 W232CR (Alton, Illinois)

Links
- Public license information: Public file; LMS
- Webcast: Listen live
- Website: 923wil.com

WIL-FM (92.3 FM) is a commercial radio station licensed to St. Louis, Missouri, United States, and serving Greater St. Louis. It airs a country music format and is owned by Hubbard Broadcasting. The studios are on Olive Boulevard, near Interstate 270 in Creve Coeur (with a St. Louis address).

The transmitter is located at 5489 Butler Hill Road in St. Louis. WIL-FM uses HD Radio technology. Its HD2 subchannel plays Americana music known as "Second Fiddle." The HD3 subchannel plays oldies and feeds FM translator W232CR at 94.3 MHz.

== History ==
WIL-FM signed on the air on July 15, 1962, as the FM sister station to WIL (1430 AM). In its first decade, it mostly simulcast the AM station, which aired a Top 40 format, and were owned by WIL, Inc., a subsidiary of Balaban Stations. At the time, their studios were in Broadcasting House in St. Louis. WIL-FM was only powered at 30,000 watts, a fraction of its current output.

WIL-FM took the call sign KFMS on March 30, 1973. After a year, it returned to WIL-FM, effective September 1, 1974. In the 1970s, WIL had switched to a personality country format, while the FM aired a more music-intensive country format, with less chatter and fewer commercials.

Over time, as more people tuned to the FM band for music listening, WIL-FM became the dominant station. Eventually, the AM station changed its call letters to KZQZ and is now dark. WIL-FM was later acquired by Salt Lake City-based Bonneville International.

Bonneville announced its sale of WIL-FM (and 16 other stations) to Hubbard Broadcasting on January 19, 2011. The sale was completed on April 29, 2011.

On January 30, 2017, WIL-FM re-branded as "New Country 92.3". On October 6, 2020, the station dropped the "New Country 92.3" branding and returned to using its call letters in its branding as "92.3 WIL".

== HD Radio ==
Starting in 2012, WIL-FM's HD2 digital subchannel began airing Americana music, calling itself "Second Fiddle". Previously, WIL-FM-HD2 was branded as "Kerosene Country", and largely had the same playlist as WIL-FM.

On February 18, 2020, WIL-FM signed on a third subchannel, and began airing an oldies format, branded as "My Mix 94.3." The subchannel feeds FM translator W232CR at 94.3 MHz in Alton, Illinois.

== See also ==
- List of three-letter broadcast call signs in the United States
