= Hoffmann Family of Companies =

American family private equity firm

Hoffmann Family of Companies is a Florida-based family-run private equity firm headquartered in Naples, Florida that owns various companies. Established in 2015, it is led by billionaire David Hoffmann.

David Hoffmann stated an aim to establish the second-largest group of newspapers in the U.S. The firm owns 19 publications, including a stake in Lee Enterprises, publications in California through its Hoffmann Media Group subsidiary, the Town Crier on Mackinac Island, Florida Weekly, and the Napa Valley Register in California, as well as a large stake in the St. Louis Post-Dispatch.

According to its website it owns 120 brands and employs 16,000 people across 30 countries. Holdings include wineries, golf courses, sports businesses, wood products companies, transportation businesses and newspapers.

It bought the Old Corkscrew Golf Club in Lee County, Florida in 2022 and is redeveloping it.

In December 2025, it was announced that the family is buying the Pittsburgh Penguins NHL hockey team from Fenway Sports Group.

== Companies ==
- Arnold Transit Company (now part of Hoffman Marine) serving Mackinac Island in Michigan
- Star Line Ferry serving Mackinac Island
- The St. Ignace News covering St. Ignace, Michigan and Mackinac County, Michigan
- Washington Missourian in Washington, Missouri
- Oberweis Dairy
- Elmer Chocolate of Louisiana.
- Ave Maria Sun, newspaper in Fort Myers, Florida
- Florida Weekly newspaper in Naples, Florida
- Babcock Ranch Telegraph in Babcock Ranch, Florida
- Florida Healthcare News
- Hertz Arena
- JED Transportation in Hazelwood, MO
- Corporate Transportation in Hazelwood, MO
- Mid American Coaches in Washington, MO
- LEO Events in Memphis, TN
- Florida Everblades
- Pittsburgh Penguins
- Lincoln Journal Star, newspaper in Lincoln, Nebraska

== See also ==
- Augusta, Missouri
