= KLPW =

KLPW may refer to:

- KLPW (AM), a radio station (1220 AM) licensed to serve Union, Missouri, United States
- KRTE-FM, a radio station (107.3 FM) licensed to serve Steelville, Missouri, which held the call sign KLPW-FM from 2010 to 2021
- KQDZ, a radio station (101.7 FM) licensed to serve Elsberry, Missouri, which held the call sign KLPW-FM until 2010
