= KQQZ =

Radio station in Fairview Heights, Illinois (1968–2020)

- Fairview Heights, Illinois; United States
- Broadcast area: Greater St. Louis
- Frequency: 1190 kHz

Ownership
- Owner: Entertainment Media Trust; (Entertainment Media Trust, Dennis J. Watkins, Trustee)
- Operator: Insane Broadcasting Company
- Sister stations: KFTK; KZQZ; WQQW

History
- First air date: November 1, 1968
- Last air date: April 12, 2020 (Note: This date applies for the transmissions, the license was officially revoked on March 20, 2020.)
- Former call signs: KHAD (1968–2000); KRFT (2000–2009)

Technical information
- Facility ID: 5281
- Class: B
- Power: 10,000 watts (day); 650 watts (night)
- Transmitter coordinates: 38°42′25″N 90°3′10″W

KQQZ was a commercial AM radio station that was licensed to serve Fairview Heights, Illinois, United States, on 1190 kHz, and broadcast from 1968 to 2020. The transmitter site was located in the town of Pontoon Beach, Illinois.

KQQZ first broadcast in 1968 as KHAD, a station licensed to De Soto, Missouri. For its first 30 years, KHAD primarily broadcast country music and talk shows. A potential sale to the Rev. Larry Rice was terminated in 2000 after a fire destroyed KHAD's studios and transmitter. Eventually, the Radio Free Texas Trust bought KHAD, changed its call sign to KRFT, and operated KRFT as a sports talk station. The sports format continued until 2010, when financial losses and the Great Recession forced the owners to sell the station.

The station's license, and the licenses of three other co-owned stations in Greater St. Louis, were revoked by the Federal Communications Commission (FCC) on March 20, 2020, after it was revealed that the principal ownership—Entertainment Media Trust—was set up as a shell company for a convicted felon, Robert S. Romanik, who operated the stations under the "Insane Broadcasting Company" name. Despite the cancellation, Romanik continued to broadcast without a valid license on the frequency until April 12, 2020. While having carried a classic country format to the end of its existence, KQQZ also aired a controversial daily talk radio show hosted by Romanik, the content of which led to additional license challenges for having potentially violated federal law against broadcasting obscenities.

== History ==
=== Early years in De Soto ===
This station began operations as KHAD on November 1, 1968, originally licensed to serve De Soto, Missouri. KHAD was a 1,000-watt daytime-only station owned by the DeSoto Broadcasting Company, a six-person partnership whose principals included Pinkney Cole. In 1969, KHAD broadcast 20 hours of country music a week. By 1970, KHAD affiliated with the Mutual Broadcasting System and played 70 hours of country music a week. By 1974, KHAD added middle of the road music and talk shows to its lineup.

In 1976, KHAD had news and talk shows in addition to country music. On December 13, 1977, KHAD strengthened its power from 1,000 to 5,000 watts and remained a daytime-only station.

KHAD was sold in 1981 to the Jefferson County Broadcasting Company—a joint operation between Pinkney and Judy Cole and Erich and Arlene Schafermeyer. The company maintained the previous Mutual Broadcasting System affiliation, with talk shows and middle of the road music through the end of the decade. The station was sold again in 1990 to Jefferson Communications. As of 1992, KHAD had a talk and country music format, with 12 hours of gospel and three hours of bluegrass weekly. In 1993, KHAD was sold to Big River Broadcasting, and to Schafermeyer Broadcasting in 1996 after Erich and Arlene Schafermeyer purchased the remaining shares owned by the Coles; son Kim Schafermeyer assumed the role of principal owner and handled the day-to-day operations of both KHAD and FM adjunct KDJR, which took to the air in 1990. The 1997 Broadcasting Yearbook listed KHAD as a "traditional country" music station.

Following months of negotiations in the fall of 1999, Schafermeyer Broadcasting reached an agreement to sell KHAD to the Rev. Larry Rice, founder and then-owner of St. Louis television station KNLC, for $225,000. Rice had planned to change KHAD's call sign to KCBW and have the station be operated in tandem with a free store in De Soto that his New Life Evangelistic Center ministry was planning to open. On January 27, 2000, the day before the sale was to have closed, an early-morning fire destroyed the studios and transmitter facilities, resulting in the deal being postponed, then called off entirely. Arson was suspected as a likely cause for the fire by area law enforcement, but no arrests were made.

Shortly after the fire, the general manager for both stations filed a complaint with the Jefferson County, Missouri, prosecuting attorney after her last paycheck had bounced; Rice had also been approached by people in phone calls and letters regarding debts owned by the stations. An attorney representing Erich and Arlene Schafermeyer admitted to the debts, but did not specify the exact amounts owed. Kim Schafermeyer had been estranged from his parents since the preceding June over real estate matters; consequently, neither parent had any involvement—nor were informed about—the sales for either station, and both considered the deals "fishy" and "messed-up".

=== Move to St. Louis ===
Silenced in the wake of the arson attack, the Radio Free Texas Trust acquired the license to KHAD in April 2000 for $125,000, changing the call sign to KRFT. The station's transmitter was relocated to a new five-tower site near Collinsville, Illinois, and changed its city of license to University City, serving the Greater St. Louis area. The facility changes were possible after WOWO in Fort Wayne, Indiana, relinquished their Class I-B clear channel status in favor of a regional Class B status, thus removing a direct obligation for this station to adjust their service contours or sign off at night to protect WOWO's nighttime skywave. While KRFT was also capable of adding nighttime service, this required a separate array of towers to be constructed and additional authorization by the FCC, which was not deemed feasible at the time.

Missouri Sports Radio, headed by Greg Marecek and which operated KFNS and KFNS-FM, entered into a local marketing agreement (LMA) to operate KRFT with intent to purchase for $1.6 million. KRFT formally returned to the air on May 13, 2002, as "The Sports Explosion", carrying the Fox Sports Radio lineup around the clock as a complement to KFNS's predominantly local lineup. All three stations were acquired by Big League Broadcasting—then the operators of WQXI in Atlanta—in May 2004 for a combined $11.5 million, $6.5 million of which was used to pay down debt. Following the sale, KRFT's Fox Sports Radio affiliation was transferred to KFNS and KFNS-FM, while KRFT took the Sporting News Radio affiliation, the lone holdover on the lineup being The Jim Rome Show.

In September 2004, Missouri Sports Radio and two other companies reached a $158,000 settlement with the federal government over charges that KRFT and other radio stations profited off illegal gambling activities conducted from 2000 to 2003.

Despite being owned by a company that specialized in sports radio, KRFT flipped to talk radio in March 2006 with a lineup consisting of both syndicated conservative and progressive hosts, a move characterized by the St. Louis Post-Dispatch as "an unusual radio experiment". Programs on KRFT included Imus in the Morning; The Al Franken Show; 2 Live Stews and The Dave Ramsey Show; and shows hosted by Clark Howard, Neal Boortz and Jim Cramer. KRFT switched formats back to sports radio on January 1, 2008, carrying the entire ESPN Radio lineup again as an all-syndicated compliment to KFNS and KFNS-FM; after WXOS acquired the affiliation rights to ESPN Radio, KRFT reverted to Sporting News Radio programming. During this period, KRFT also carried play-by-play broadcasts KFNS and KFNS-FM were unable to carry due to schedule conflicts, or had declined to run altogether.

=== Romanik era ===
==== Insane Broadcasting Company ====
If you can make money with sheep baaing back and forth and if we can market it and people like to listen to sheep baa, I’ll have the sheep-baaingest station in the country.

— Bob Romanik, on Entertainment Media Trust's purchases of KRFT and WFFX

In part due to the aftereffects of the Great Recession locally, Big League Broadcasting began selling off all their assets, having lost more than $9 million in the market over five years. Entertainment Media Trust (EMT)—whose officer, director and trustee was identified as Dennis J. Watkins—acquired KRFT for $600,000 in a transaction filed on September 25, 2009. EMT had previously acquired WIL (1430 AM) from Bonneville International in early 2008, then the third oldest-surviving radio station in Greater St. Louis, (Note: WIL was also the fourth oldest station in St. Louis overall, preceded by KSD, WEW and WCK, respectively.) renaming it KZQZ. The purchase of KRFT was immediately followed with the purchase of WFFX (1490 AM) from KSLG (1380 AM) owner Simmons Media Group, both KRFT and WFFX were valued at over $1 million. EMT's ownership interests also included WQQW (1510 AM) in Highland, Illinois, which was acquired in September 2006 from the Rev. Larry Rice's New Life Evangelistic Center and initially held the WXOZ calls.

Under the name Insane Broadcasting Company, Entertainment Media Trust switched KRFT's format to classic country, branded "Kool Killer Kountry" and under the KQQZ call sign, while WFFX was renamed WQQX upon that deal's closure. Robert "Bob" S. Romanik, who identified himself in a 2010 newspaper interview as a "consultant" for Insane Broadcasting, claimed to have been run by his son Stephen Romanik, also hosted a talk show on KZQZ billed as the "Grim Reaper of Radio". This program initially aired on WXOZ starting on September 4, 2006, when Insane assumed control of that station, billed by Romanik as a "verbal Jerry Springer" where listeners could "be able to get things off of their chest". Romanik had also claimed that the stations were not bought to "knock sports off the air" but viewed them as a good business opportunity, while playing down any involvement in Grand Slam Sports (which itself acquired KFNS and KSLG). By November 2010, EMT received approval from the FCC to upgrade KQQZ's nighttime service from 22 watts to 650 watts; included in this was a city of license change for the station to Fairview Heights, Illinois.

Despite the initial claims that his son headed Insane Broadcasting, Romanik was effectively seen as the de facto head of the group and having taken a "very hands-on role" to station operations, and had been from the beginning, acting as WXOZ's general manager upon launch. The Rev. Larry Rice later expressed regret at the sale of WXOZ upon realizing the parties involved and at first tried to minister to Romanik, after being reassured that Romanik wanted to own WXOZ to play "some old-time songs", Rice shared with him a copy of I Walk the Line and stepped aside. Veteran broadcaster Kevin Slaten was hired by KQQZ in early March 2013 to host an afternoon-drive program, with plans to ultimately develop a full-time lineup of male-oriented talk programming on the station. When Slaten left KQQZ that June 27 to be part of a start-up venture time-brokered on WGNU, Romanik took to the air in Slaten's time slot the next day, repeatedly attacking him on-air for nearly 15 minutes and claiming "his moral compass is all screwed up"; Slaten responded by calling Romanik "a coward" and that KQQZ had "no future" for failing to acquire any additional air talent.

==== Inflammatory on-air content ====
I'm politically insane. I'm a political mercenary. Everybody doesn't deserve fifteen minutes of fame. They deserve fifteen minutes of recognition. That's what I want to give everybody.

— Bob Romanik

Meanwhile, Romanik's talk show, which had since been moved to KQQZ, began to receive local attention for an increasing usage of pejoratives, racial epithets, misogyny and homophobia against local politicians, ethnic groups and different sexual orientations, in particular targeting elected officials affiliated with the Democratic Party and their families. When Caseyville, Illinois, police chief Jose Alvarez fired Steve Romanik from his position as a probationary patrolman on February 11, 2014, due to insufficient qualifications, Romanik contacted Caseyville mayor Leonard Black, who fired Alvarez the next day. In January 2016, Romanik—via his "St. Clair County Freedom Coalition"—headed an unsuccessful campaign to force three circuit court judges in St. Clair County, Illinois out of their positions; all three judges resigned and immediately ran for their old seats. During an on-air interview Romanik conducted with St. Louis Aldermanic President Lewis E. Reed over the city's attempt to prevent the St. Louis Rams from relocating to Los Angeles, Romanik began verbally attacking Alderman Megan Green after her criticism of the usage of public money to keep the team, making comments about her appearance and saying she should be "flushed down the toilet." In a Washington Post profile written shortly after the Congressional baseball shooting, Romanik admitted it was possible the perpetrator, who like Romanik lived in Belleville, Illinois, likely listened to his program, saying "you'd probably see a lot of people right on the same page (with the shooter) all over the country. But around here, for sure."

All of these events, in turn, led to Romanik's background as a former strip club owner, East St. Louis, Illinois, homicide detective, and chief of police in Washington Park, Illinois, drawing additional scrutiny. Following his tenure as Washington Park police chief, Romanik pleaded guilty on March 3, 1997, to obstruction of justice for lying 150 times to a grand jury and was sentenced to a year's probation. Three days before that probation was to have been completed, Romanik was implicated in a bank fraud investigation tied to his strip clubs. After his probation was revoked, Romanik pleaded guilty to those charges on April 14, 1999, and served one year in prison before being released to a halfway house. His private detective license in Illinois was also revoked in 2002, but Steve Romanik had already taken over both that practice and the strip club operations. When running against Francis Slay for Mayor of St. Louis in 2013, Lewis Reed attracted attention after his campaign finance report filings showed Romanik as a substantial donor; Reed denied any knowledge of Romanik's legal past, saying, "I met him about a year ago... I just know him as the radio guy."

Throughout 2016, Romanik ran as the Republican nominee for the Illinois House of Representatives' open 114th district seat, notably berating and verbally attacking his African-American opponent, East St. Louis council member LaToya Greenwood, during his radio shows. During the campaign, Romanik paid $3,900 to an area utility cooperative to cover delinquent electric bills for Horseshoe Lake State Park, Ramsey Lake State Park and Carlyle Lake State Park in a publicity stunt purportedly in Steve Romanik's name, who had died the year before. Greenwood won the election. Following the election, KQQZ flipped formats to talk radio full-time on December 5, 2016, headlined by Romanik's program and a local morning show hosted by a returning Kevin Slaten, along with The Laura Ingraham Show, The Savage Nation, The Jim Bohannon Show and The Glenn Beck Program. KQQZ reverted to classic country in February 2017 after representatives for the syndicated programming contacted the station regarding the content on Romanik's show, this followed his repeated use of a racial slur on-air to refer to rapper Waka Flocka Flame that prompted the St. Louis Post-Dispatch editorial board to advocate for an intervention by the FCC. Romanik publicly asserted that he was in control of the format switch, retorting, "no one's going to tell me what I can and can't say." Both Romanik and Slaten's talk shows were retained, and the station used the branding "Hot Talk/Kool Killer Kountry".

==== License challenges ====
IMHO, the RICO act should be engaged and all of these creeps should be tossed out and the licenses put up for sale. It's just a very shabby deal.

— Mike Anderson, STLMedia.net, May 20, 2011

Among the people targeted on-air by Romanik was Mark Kern, an elected official (Note: RadioInsight identified Kern as the "Commissioner of St. Clair County" but the county website identifies him as having been elected as St. Clair County Board Chairman in 2004.) in St. Clair County, over repeated claims that Kern did not fully reside in the county. In one incident, Romanik drove to Kern's Belleville home and confronted his wife, who filed a police report; Romanik was arrested several days later on trespassing charges. Kern filed an initial challenge to the license renewals of KQQZ and its sister stations in 2012, alleging that Romanik was actually in control of the stations in violation of federal laws that prohibit felons from owning broadcast stations. This later was expanded to claims Romanik had gone so far as negotiate a local marketing agreement between Entertainment Media Trust and Emmis Communications in September 2016 for WQQX—itself renamed KFTK (1490 AM). (Note: This local marketing agreement was assumed by Entercom on March 1, 2018.) In turn, Romanik frequently accused Kern on-air of cross-dressing and engaged in homophobic slurs to describe him.

This was not the first instance of a public figure openly questioning Romanik's involvement; former St. Louis radio personality Mike Anderson accused him of being in control of the group on his media blog as early as November 9, 2009, and called for an invocation of the Racketeer Influenced and Corrupt Organizations Act in a May 20, 2011, posting. Romanik threatened litigation against Anderson in April 2010, to which Anderson responded, "check the FCC license to see the names of the owners... I wish Mr. Romanik luck in the development of his (licensed to someone else) radio group".

In April 2018, Missouri state senator Jamilah Nasheed sent a letter to FCC Chairman Ajit Pai requesting that Romanik be fined and KQQZ's license be cancelled based on violations of United States Code Title 18, Section 1464, prohibiting obscene, indecent or profane language on broadcasts. In May 2018, a judge issued an order of protection against Romanik after he gave out another man's home address on his show one day and told his listeners to "visit" the other man; Romanik said that the other man had posted Romanik's home address on Facebook first. At the same time, Missouri representative Bob Burns was expelled from the state's Democratic Party caucus after Burns received criticism for appearing on Romanik's show several times; Burns claimed that audio from the interviews were edited and taken out of context. Burns would later present morning host Kevin Slaten with a resolution from the Missouri House of Representatives proclaiming Slaten the "Best Sportscaster in St. Louis" despite the mounting controversy surrounding Romanik and KQQZ.

The FCC requested on May 17, 2018, that Romanik answer a series of detailed questions about the operations of EMT, based in part from paperwork filed that was to have reassigned control of the trust to Katrina Sanders in the wake of Steven Romanik's death; Sanders was found to have the same mailing address as Romanik, and was also the same address used for Insane Broadcasting and his political campaigns. On June 5, 2019, the FCC designated all four EMT stations' licenses for a revocation hearing, having discovered in this investigation that "Romanik established EMT and provided all of EMT's funds for the acquisition of the stations, but was not listed as a party in any of EMT's applications", that "EMT's 2012 trust instrument was executed after EMT acquired the stations and does not appear to contain provisions insulating Romanik from ownership of the stations as required under Commission rules", that Romanik had purported to assign EMT's interests in the radio station to his own girlfriend, and that Romanik listed himself as a radio station owner on several political campaign contribution disclosures. An analysis by communication attorneys Erwin Krasnow and John Wells King for Radio & Television Business Report called the hearing designation order "an eyebrow-raising tale likely unmatched in the history of FCC licensing" and "provides a road map for broadcasters who do not want to jeopardize their station licenses."

==== Cancellation and aftermath ====
Whatever you do, Bob, rest assured: The FCC is paying very close attention. You might want to make sure the stations’ music royalties are up to date for “The Sound of Silence,” because that and a lot of static could be on Insane Broadcasting’s playlist in the not-so-distant future.

— Tod Robberson, St. Louis Post-Dispatch editorial page editor

Following the designation for hearing, EMT filed for bankruptcy protection on September 11, 2019, listing combined assets of $2 million ($1.6 million for all four licenses and $400,000 for equipment and facilities). In a brief filed before bankruptcy court that October 8, trustee Donald Samson claimed that several buyers had emerged for all four stations, and requested the FCC to end their investigations so the divestitures could proceed. In an interview with MetroSTL, bankruptcy attorney Andrew Magdy viewed the filing as both a delay tactic and possible legal maneuver for Romanik to have control over any possible sale of the assets and profit from them, while a license revocation would leave him with nothing but debt. Despite this filing, the FCC assigned administrative law judge Jane Hinckley Halprin to preside over the four stations, and set up a timeline that November for the hearings to proceed, in which the hearing would have ultimately commenced on October 19, 2020; EMT filed to dismiss its bankruptcy action at the same time.

Trustee Dennis J. Watkins, who was acting as EMT's legal representative, failed to make a single appearance before Judge Halprin after multiple requests issued to do so, then submitted a pleading in January 2020 which was found to be "procedurally and substantively deficient". This prompted Halprin to issue a ruling admonishing EMT and issuing a deadline of February 10, 2020, for Watkins to explain why the renewals should not be dismissed, writing in her opinion, "the time has come to question whether additional government time and resources should be devoted to this matter". After Watkins failed to submit any rebuttal at that deadline, all four stations had their license renewals dismissed for failure to prosecute, and were ultimately cancelled by the FCC on that March 20. As of March 23, 2020, Kern had filed a proposal with the FCC for the EMT stations to be auctioned after the withdrawal of a proposal by a local black-owned group to take over the stations with the backing of the Multicultural Media, Telecom and Internet Council; the filing also asked the FCC to insure that EMT and Romanik not be allowed to profit from the sale or lease of the stations' towers or equipment. The FCC ruling deleting all four licenses also included a provision protecting the service contours of all four former licenses, pending any future action by the commission.

Despite the cancellation of the station's license, transmissions continued on the 1190 AM frequency until April 12, 2020, in defiance of the FCC's order. Unlicensed transmissions also occurred on the 1430 AM frequency formerly occupied by KZQZ that promptly ceased following published newspaper reports about both now-illicit operations. Romanik's final broadcast that April 10 was characterized with the coarse and inflammatory language common with the history of that show; Bob Burns, since term-limited from his Missouri State House seat, called into the program to express support. A St. Louis Post-Dispatch editorial heralded the silencing as "taking (away) Bob Romanik's ability to pollute the public airwaves with his racism and homophobia...gone will be Romanik's constant use of the N-word, including more than 35 times in his 2½-minute closing rap-song segment. Yes, it truly is time for Romanik to drop the mic. His broadcast-ownership days are over." The Riverfront Times critiqued, "now, it appears that a real reaper, in the form of the Federal Communications Commission, has finally done what complaints from politicians and editorials couldn't: End a the (sic) bafflingly long-lived racist radio call-in show."

Morning host Kevin Slaten soon moved over to an internet-based morning show operated by Donze Communications, licensee of KSGM and KBDZ in the vicinity of Ste. Genevieve, Missouri. Romanik died on May 7, 2022, at the age of 72 following a prolonged battle with cancer.

==== FCC Auction 109 ====
The FCC announced on February 8, 2021, that the former EMT-licensed AM allocations in the St. Louis market, including KQQZ's frequency, would go up for auction on July 27, 2021. No bids were received for any of the four frequencies during the eight-day auction.
