= KHAD (disambiguation) =

KHAD was the security and intelligence agency of the Democratic Republic of Afghanistan.

KHAD may also refer to:

- Harford Field, the airport in Casper, Wyoming, United States, ICAO airportcode KAHD
- KWBB, a radio station in Upton, Wyoming, United States, known as KHAD 2009–2023
- KQQZ, a radio station in University City, Missouri, United States, known as KHAD 1968–2000
- KZQL, a radio station in Mills, Wyoming, United States, known as KHAD 2005–2009

== See also ==
- Khaad, a 2014 Indian film
- Khadi, a hand-spun Indian cotton cloth
  - Khadi and Village Industries Commission
