= KWUL =

KWUL may refer to:

- KWUL (AM), a radio station (920 AM) licensed to serve St. Louis, Missouri, United States
- KQDZ, a radio station (101.7 FM) licensed to serve Elsberry, Missouri, which held the call signs KWUL and KWUL-FM from 2016 to 2025
