= KFNS =

KFNS may refer to:

- KFNS (AM), a radio station (590 AM) licensed to Wood River, Illinois, United States
- KFNS-FM, a radio station (100.7 FM) licensed to Troy, Missouri, United States
