= WGNU =

WGNU may refer to:

- KWUL (AM), a radio station (920 AM) licensed to serve St. Louis, Missouri, United States, which held the call sign WGNU from 1961 to 2023
- WARH, a radio station (106.5 FM) licensed to serve Granite City, Illinois, United States, which held the call sign WGNU-FM from 1965 to 1977
