= 590 The Fan =

590 The Fan may refer to the following sports radio AM stations:

- KFNS (AM) - branded 590 The Fan, in St. Louis, Missouri.
- CJCL - branded Sportsnet 590 The Fan, in Toronto, Ontario.
