= WTMV =

WTMV may refer to:

- WTMV-LD, a low-power television station (channel 35, virtual 29) licensed to serve Ogden, North Carolina, United States
- WAMV (Illinois), a radio station (1490 AM) licensed to serve St. Louis, Missouri, United States, which held the call sign WTMV from 1935 to 1957
- WYVL, a radio station (88.5 FM) licensed to serve Youngsville, Pennsylvania, United States, which held the call sign WTMV from 1998 to 2011
- WMOR-TV, a television station (channel 19, virtual 32) licensed to serve Lakeland, Florida, United States, which held the call sign WTMV from 1986 to 1996
