= WAMV (Illinois) =

Radio station in East St. Louis, Illinois (1935–1964)

WAMV and WAMV-FM
East St. Louis, Illinois; United States
- Broadcast area: Greater St. Louis
- Frequencies: WAMV: 1490 kHz; WAMV-FM: 101.1 MHz

Ownership
- Owner: Stan-Lin, Inc.

History
- First air date: WAMV: May 19, 1935; WAMV-FM: May 3, 1960
- Last air date: WAMV: April 24, 1964
- Former call signs: WAMV: WTMV (1935–1957); WAMV (1957–1961, 1963–1964); WBBR (1961–1963)
- Former frequencies: WAMV: 1500 kHz (1935–1941)
- Call sign meaning: ABC Mississippi Valley

Technical information
- Power: WAMV: 500 watts day; 250 watts night
- ERP: WAMV-FM: 37,000 watts
- HAAT: WAMV-FM: 140 ft (43 m)
- Transmitter coordinates: WAMV: 38°37′29″N 90°9′39″W

WAMV was a radio station that operated in East St. Louis, Illinois, from 1935 to 1964 on the AM band. An FM adjunct operated on 101.1 FM from 1960 to 1964, using the WAMV-FM call sign at both the beginning and conclusion of its existence.

== History ==
=== WTMV ===
WTMV signed on at 6 p.m. on May 19, 1935. WTMV broadcast at 1500 kHz and was owned by the Mississippi Valley Broadcasting Company, with studios in the Broadview Hotel. The station relocated to 1490 kHz after NARBA. Almost immediately after the frequency change took effect on March 29, 1941, the station attempted to increase its power from 250 watts during the day to 1,000 watts day and 500 night and to move to 1540 kHz.

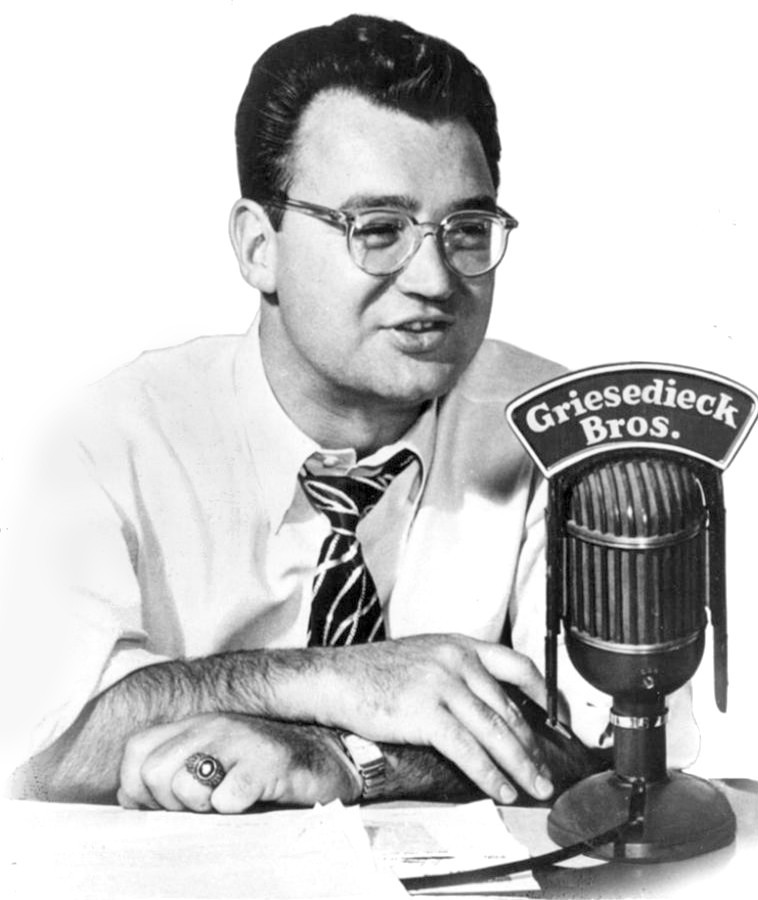
1951 publicity photo of Harry Caray at a Griesedieck Bros. microphone; while Griesedieck sponsored Cardinal broadcasts when they were on WTMV, by 1951 they had moved to WIL

In 1945, Carlin French sold WTMV to William F. Johns of Chicago and his son, Myles H. Johns of Milwaukee; both owned radio stations in Wisconsin. That same year, on April 17, 1945, a young Harry Caray called his first Major League Baseball game over WTMV, a Cardinals broadcast with Gabby Street. Additionally, Caray and Street teamed up to broadcast St. Louis Browns games that were also heard on WTMV and WEW. Beyond baseball, Caray called St. Louis Flyers hockey, basketball, and wrestling events for WTMV. At the same time, Caray hosted KXOK's "Sports Extra" talk show. The station branded itself heavily as "the sports end of your dial"; many WTMV sports broadcasts were sponsored by Griesedieck Brothers beer, which also put together the Cardinals baseball radio network beginning in 1947 with WTMV and WEW as its stations in St. Louis. (The Browns moved all of their games to WIL that same year.)

Under Johns ownership, WTMV made the first of two incursions into FM broadcasting. While the station had applied for a station on 47.1 MHz in January 1945, when the FM band was still 42 to 50 MHz, WTMV-FM 102.5 did not begin operations until July 28, 1949. WTMV-FM was not a success; even though the AM-FM stations were profitable in 1949, WTMV tried, to no avail, to get the Federal Communications Commission (FCC) to waive its minimum hours of operation rule for the FM side. The WTMV-FM license was deleted at the station's request on December 31, 1952.

=== WAMV ===
In October 1957, WTMV changed its callsign to WAMV. The station also became the St. Louis ABC affiliate on January 10, 1958, after WIL relinquished the hookup. By this time, WAMV was owned by Robert W. Day and broadcast 24 hours a week of African American programs, as well as two hours a week in Polish.

Radio Missouri Corp. sold WAMV in 1959 to the Hess-Hawkins Co. of East St. Louis for $265,000. May 3, 1960, saw WAMV-FM 101.1 hit the air, simulcasting WAMV's programming.

=== Final years, WBBR experiment and closure ===
WAMV's final sale came in 1961, when the Stan-Lin Corp. of Jacksonville, Florida, acquired WAMV-AM-FM from Hess-Hawkins for $350,000. Stan-Lin wasted no time making major changes to WAMV's programming. In July, WAMV-AM-FM became WBBR-AM-FM "Big Beat Radio", with a modern rock-and-roll format. However, the sale application ran into headwinds at the FCC when the commission announced it would review its June 1 approval just a month later, on July 3. While several complaints centered around the format flip planned by Stan-Lin, the sale approval took East St. Louis city officials by surprise. The mayor, Chamber of Commerce, and others protested that they were under the impression the sale had been called off when it had been approved; furthermore, an East St. Louis newspaper had reported, as had others who were advised by the station manager, that there would be no change in management or format of the stations. Stating that there were enough available stations in WAMV's former "good music" format, the FCC gave the sale final approval in October, though Pete Rahn, TV and radio editor for the St. Louis Globe-Democrat, denounced the sale of WAMV to "a Southern syndicate that specializes in raucous rhythm-blues programming".

The station ultimately flipped back to the WAMV call letters and ABC Radio affiliation in June 1963. However, financial troubles were brewing that would ultimately mean the end of the station. That same month, Hess-Hawkins initiated foreclosure proceedings against Stan-Lin, alleging it had never been paid; in East St. Louis city court, it received a $314,000 judgment against the current owners. The judgment, secured by a mortgage on station equipment, also named Thomas Carrillo as WAMV's custodian. After Carrillo announced that the station did not have the money to pay its employees, at midnight on April 24, 1964, WAMV permanently ceased operations. The four engineers were told by the custodian to consider themselves laid off. While Stan-Lin applied for permission to sell the station back to Hess-Hawkins so it could be conveyed to a group of East St. Louis businessmen, this never happened. The ABC affiliation for St. Louis was awarded that July to WBBY 590 in Wood River, Illinois. The WAMV license was deleted on May 11, 1965.

== Comparative hearings for a successor ==
WAMV's closure marked the beginning of years of hearings and competing applications to return the 1490 kHz frequency to use in East St. Louis. A new East St. Louis Broadcasting Company applied for the frequency in February 1965 and was joined by Metro-East Broadcasting. At the start of 1969, FCC hearing examiner Isadore A. Honig proposed the grant of the station to East St. Louis Broadcasting. In finding in favor of East St. Louis, Honig noted the "unusually poor" broadcast record of Metro-East principal Harmon I. Moseley, who had been found of "irresponsible conduct" in his time running KAAB in Hot Springs, Arkansas, where he once attacked other local stations on the air. Later in 1969, however, the FCC review board reversed the hearing examiner's ruling and granted Metro-East's application, saying that Moseley was a relatively small stockholder in the applicant. The hearing proceedings finally ended on September 29, 1971, when the FCC granted the East St. Louis application; their WESL went on the air July 10, 1972, more than eight years after WAMV ceased operations. the station's license was deleted by the Federal Communications Commission on March 20, 2020.

The FM frequency took far less time to return. On May 13, 1966, the Our Lady of the Snows Shrine of Belleville, Illinois, put WMRY on the air.
