= KRTK (FM) =

Conservative talk radio station in Hermann, Missouri, United States

Coordinates: 38.1045°N 91.0418°W

- Hermann, Missouri; United States
- Broadcast area: Western suburbs of St. Louis
- Frequency: 93.3 MHz
- Branding: The Real Talk Radio Network

Programming
- Format: Conservative talk
- Network: Townhall News
- Affiliations: Salem Radio Network; Westwood One

Ownership
- Owner: Louis Eckelkamp; (East Central Broadcasting, LLC)
- Operator: Ellis Media & Broadcasting
- Sister stations: KRTE-FM; KVMO; KWUL; KQDZ; KDHX

History
- First air date: 1985
- Former call signs: KNSX (1983–2007); KQQX (2007–2017); KLUQ (2017–2021)
- Call sign meaning: Real Talk

Technical information
- Licensing authority: FCC
- Facility ID: 68579
- Class: C2
- ERP: 50,000 watts
- HAAT: 96 meters (315 ft)
- Repeaters: 104.3 KVMO (Vandalia); 107.3 KRTE-FM (Steelville); 1010 KDHX (St. Louis)

Links
- Public license information: Public file; LMS
- Webcast: Listen live
- Website: www.realtalk933.com

KRTK (93.3 MHz) is a commercial FM radio station licensed to Hermann, Missouri, and broadcasting to the western suburbs of Greater St. Louis. It is owned by Louis Ecklekamp with the license held by East Central Broadcasting. KRTK and sister station KDHX (1010 AM) simulcast a conservative talk radio format.

== Programming ==
KRTK and KDHX air conservative talk hosts around the clock. Some of the shows are nationally syndicated. From Westwood One, they run The Mark Levin Show. From the Salem Radio Network, they carry The Charlie Kirk Show. Most hours begin with an update from Townhall News.

== History ==
=== KNSX and KQQX ===
The station began in Steelville, Missouri. It signed on the air in 1985 as KNSX on 96.7 MHz, with a power of 3,000 watts. In 1996, the station completed an upgrade to a Class C2 facility, giving it a signal covering a wide area of Eastern and Central Missouri. It was owned by Randy Wachter.

In 2007, KNSX changed its call letters to KQQX. In 2011, KQQX received authorization from the Federal Communications Commission (FCC) to change the station's city of license from Steelville to Hermann and move the tower closer to the St. Louis Metropolitan area. This was coupled with an upgrade in power to 50,000 watts.

KNSX was one of the first FM stations that was digitally automated with no live DJs. The station also was a pioneer under Randy Wachter's ownership with webcasting a live feed online via Real Audio, of which KNSX was among the top 10 most-listened-to webstreams in 1997–1998.

=== KLUQ ===
The FCC reported on August 14, 2017, that the station had changed its call sign to WLUQ, although all evidence of this change was removed from the FCC's records on September 5, 2017. However, the station did change its call sign to KLUQ on September 8, 2017.

KLUQ was in receivership after being repossessed from Twenty One Sound Communications, which was wholly owned by Randy Wachter, who founded the station. KLUQ was running on a special temporary authority (STA) at a power of 1,000 watts from a tower near Warrenton, Missouri, and was simulcasting Americana music programming from KWUL-FM 101.7 in Elsberry, Missouri.

=== K-WOLF and KRTK ===
In 2016, KLUQ brought back Americana music as "K-WOLF", also carried on KVMO and KWUL. From 2017 to January 2019, it aired a format of hard-edged Christian rock music. From 1996 to 2016, the station aired a successful alternative rock format under the KNSX and later KQQX call letters as "93X".

On July 14, 2021, KLUQ changed its call sign to KRTK. It began carrying conservative talk shows as "RealTalk 93.3" along with sister station KVMO. KWUL-AM-FM continued to broadcast Americana music as "K-WOLF". With the expansion of "Real Talk" to other frequencies, in November 2021, the group of stations were called "The Real Talk Radio Network."
