= KXQX =

KXQX may refer to:

- KXQX (FM), a radio station (92.3 FM) licensed to serve Tusayan, Arizona, United States; see List of radio stations in Arizona
- KQDZ, a radio station (101.7 FM) licensed to serve Elsberry, Missouri, United States, which held the call sign KXQX from 2010 to 2016
