= KDHX =

KDHX may refer to:

- KDHX (AM), a radio station (1010 AM) licensed to serve St. Louis, Missouri, United States, formerly KXEN, using the KDHX call sign since December 2025
- KLJT, a radio station (88.1 FM) licensed to serve St. Louis, which held the call sign KDHX from 1987 until 2025
