= KKAC =

KKAC may refer to:

- KKAC (TV), a television station (channel 19) licensed to serve Carlsbad, New Mexico, United States; see List of television stations in New Mexico
- KVMO, a radio station (104.3 FM) licensed to serve Hannibal, Missouri, United States, which held the call sign KKAC from 2000 to 2017
