= WQQW =

WQQW may refer to:

- 570 WWRC, Bethesda, Maryland, which used the call sign WQQW from 1946 to 1951
- 1590 WQQW (Connecticut), Waterbury, Connecticut, which used the call sign from 1972 to its deletion in 1996
- 1510 WQQW (Illinois), Highland, Illinois, which used the call sign from 2009 to its deletion in 2020
