= Broadview Hotel =

Broadview Hotel may refer to the following places:

== Canada ==
- Broadview Hotel (Toronto) (previously New Broadview House Hotel) in Toronto, Canada

== United States ==
- Broadview Hotel (East St. Louis, Illinois), listed on the National Register of Historic Places
- Broadview Hotel (Wichita, Kansas), listed on the National Register of Historic Places
- Broadview Hotel (Emporia, Kansas) in Emporia, Kansas
