= KRFT =

KRFT may refer to:

- KRFT-LD, a television station (channel 21, virtual 8) licensed to serve Springfield, Missouri, United States
- KQQZ, a radio station (1190 AM) licensed to serve Fairview Heights, Illinois, United States, which held the call sign KRFT from 2000 to 2009
- Kraft Foods' former NASDAQ ticker symbol
