= KFTK =

KFTK may refer to:

- KFTK-FM, a radio station (97.1 FM) licensed to Florissant, Missouri, United States
- KFTK (AM), a defunct radio station (1490 AM) formerly licensed to East St. Louis, Illinois, United States
- Godman Army Airfield, a military airport at Fort Knox, Kentucky assigned the ICAO code KFTK
