= Broadview Hotel (East St. Louis, Illinois) =

- U.S. National Register of Historic Places
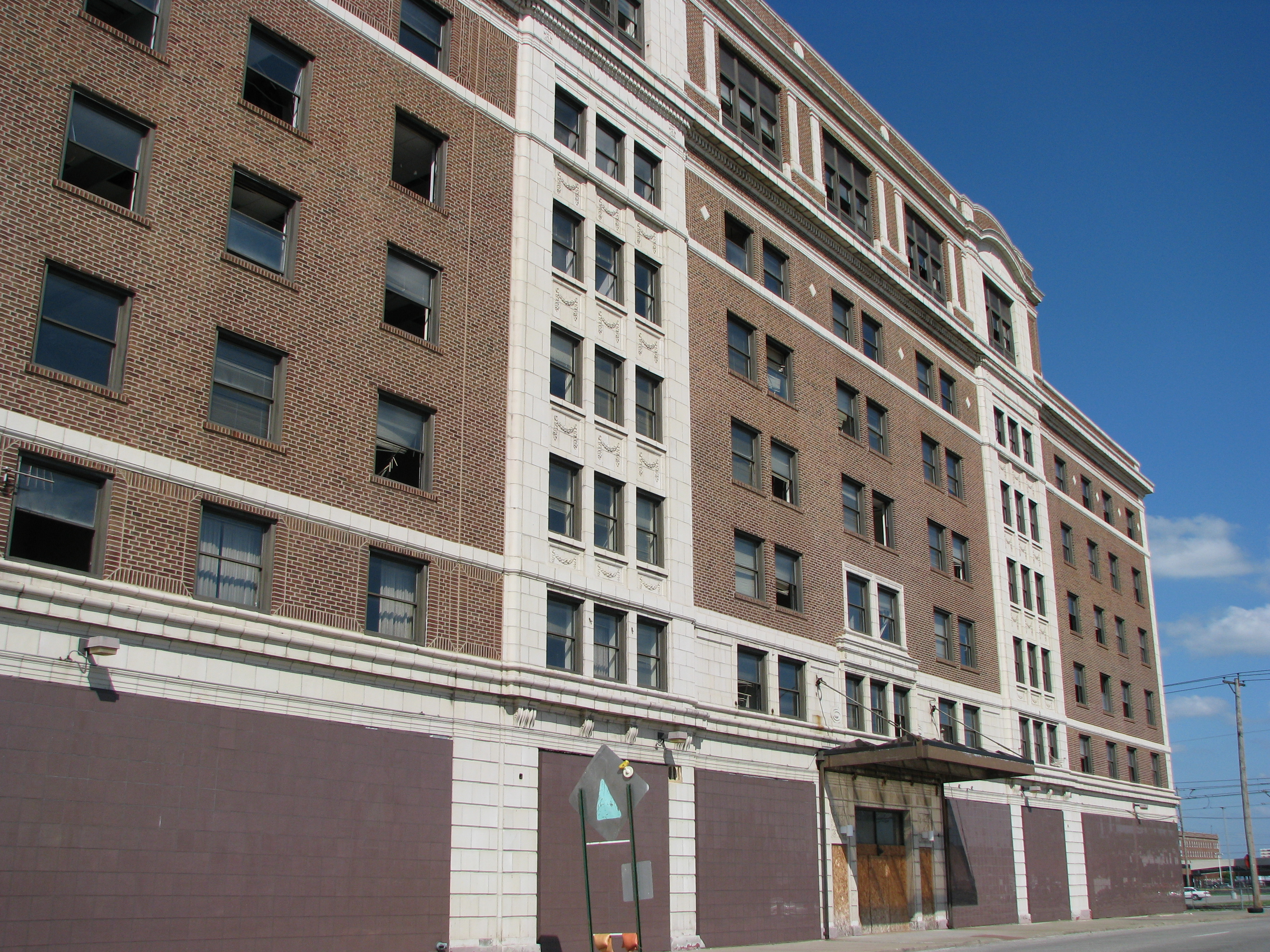

- Location within Illinois Location within the United States
- Location: 415 E. Broadway, East St. Louis, Illinois
- Coordinates: 38°37′29″N 90°9′39″W
- Built: 1927
- Architectural style: Classical Revival
- NRHP reference No.: 13001006
- Added to NRHP: December 31, 2013

The Broadview Hotel is a historic hotel building located at 415 E. Broadway in East St. Louis, Illinois. The Classical Revival hotel was constructed in 1927. From its opening until the 1950s, the hotel was one of the finest in East St. Louis. It was added to the National Register of Historic Places in 2013. It was reopened as senior housing in 2025.

== History ==
When it opened in 1927, the Broadview Hotel was the largest and most luxurious in the city, with a restaurant, a rooftop garden, a ballroom and meeting rooms. Each of the 260 rooms had air conditioning and bathrooms. The hotel intended to attract both local civic groups and out-of-town visitors; it succeeded in this in its first year, as the city's Elks Lodge moved to the building and the Illinois State Convention of Realtors held its annual meeting there. The hotel also housed the studio for the first radio station in East St. Louis; WIL broadcast from the studio from 1927 to 1935, when WTMV took over the studio. The Rotary club of East St Louis held their weekly noon meeting from 1927 for over 30 years. Rotarians were investors in the building as well. The hotel remained one of the city's most important until the 1950s, when large hotels became less popular nationally. In 1957, Southern Illinois University began renting office space in the building, as it had recently opened a satellite campus in East St. Louis; the university purchased the hotel outright in the 1970s. Since the university left the building in 2004, it has remained vacant. The building was added to the National Register of Historic Places on December 31, 2013. From March 2023 to March 2025, it was restored as The New Broadview, offering affordable senior residences.

== Architecture ==
The Widmer Engineering Company designed the hotel in the Classical Revival style. The Classical Revival style was both nationally popular in the 1920s and commonly used in hotels in the St. Louis area. The brick building is built around a concrete frame and features terra cotta facing on its front facade. The terra cotta facing marks the two outer bays of the taller central section of the building; terra cotta is also used surrounding the entrance, in multiple belt courses between stories, and in the building's cornice. The building's design is relatively plain and free of ornamentation; this both reflected the utilitarian focus of the engineering company and the cost-effective approach of the hotel's owners, who did not wish to pay for separate architectural and engineering firms.
