= KQDZ =

Radio station in Elsberry, Missouri

- Elsberry, Missouri; United States
- Broadcast area: Lincoln County, Missouri
- Frequency: 101.7 MHz
- Branding: Q101

Programming
- Format: Classic hits

Ownership
- Owner: Louis Eckelkamp; (East Central Broadcasting, LLC)
- Sister stations: KRTE-FM; KRTK; KVMO; KWUL; KXEN

History
- First air date: 1966 (as KLPW-FM)
- Former call signs: KLPW-FM (1966–2010); KXQX (2010–2016); KWUL (2016–2023); KWUL-FM (2023–2025)

Technical information
- Licensing authority: FCC
- Facility ID: 70301
- Class: A
- ERP: 3,100 watts
- HAAT: 142 meters (466 ft)
- Transmitter coordinates: 39°06′9″N 90°49′23″W

Links
- Public license information: Public file; LMS
- Webcast: Listen live
- Website: q101stl.com

KQDZ (101.7 MHz) is a radio station licensed to Elsberry, Missouri, and serving Lincoln County and the Metro West suburbs of St. Louis. It is owned by Louis Eckelkamp, with the license held by East Central Broadcasting. KQDZ airs a classic hits format.

KQDZ is a Class A station with an effective radiated power (ERP) of 3,100 watts.

== History ==
The station was originally KLPW-FM, licensed to Union, Missouri. It went on the air in 1966 as the FM counterpart to KLPW (1220 AM). For its first couple of years was a classical music station broadcasting with 1,000 watts of power. In 1968, it changed to country music, and it aired that format for the next 42 years.

In 2008, the 101.7 FM frequency was relocated from Union in Franklin County, Missouri. It moved over 50 miles (80 km) to the northeast. Its tower was put on a site overlooking the Mississippi River bluffs near Elsberry, where it better serves the St. Louis Metro West area.

In 2010, the station changed its call sign to KXQX, airing adult album alternative rock music (AAA) as "101.7 FMX". Poor health and a difficult financial situation affected Randy Wachter, who had owned the station since 2008. He took KXQX off the air in 2014. It was able to maintain its license by broadcasting once a year until the radio station was forced into the court-ordered receivership of Dennis Wallace, a Maryland-based TV and radio engineer, in 2016.

The station returned to the air in July 2017 under a court-appointed receiver with the new call sign KWUL, at first returning to its previous AAA rock format. In early 2018, it started calling itself "K-Wulf 101.7" using the positioner "Rock 'n Americana". It began playing a mix of Americana music and Southern-influenced classic rock.

Effective May 3, 2021, KWUL and two sister stations were sold to Louis Eckelkamp's East Central Broadcasting, LLC. The cost was $2,500 and forgiveness of the outstanding debt. On March 17, 2023, the station changed its call sign to KWUL-FM.

On March 19, 2025, KWUL-FM changed its format from Americana to a simulcast of classic rock-formatted KBDZ from Perryville; the previous format continued on KWUL (920 AM) in St. Louis. The call sign was changed to KQDZ on April 23, 2025.

On July 17, 2026, KQDZ split from its simulcast with KBDZ and launched a classic hits format, branded as "Q101".
