= KVMO =

Conservative talk radio station in Vandalia, Missouri

Simulcast of KRTK
- Vandalia, Missouri; United States
- Broadcast area: Hannibal, Missouri
- Frequency: 104.3 MHz
- Branding: The Real Talk Radio Network

Programming
- Format: Conservative talk
- Affiliations: Salem Radio Network; Townhall News

Ownership
- Owner: Louis Eckelkamp; (East Central Broadcasting, LLC)
- Operator: Ellis Media & Broadcasting
- Sister stations: KDHX; KRTE-FM; KRTK; KWUL; KQDZ

History
- First air date: 2001 (as KKAC)
- Former call signs: KKAC (2000–2017)
- Call sign meaning: Vandalia, Missouri

Technical information
- Licensing authority: FCC
- Facility ID: 81744
- Class: C3
- ERP: 11,380 watts
- HAAT: 148 meters (486 ft)
- Transmitter coordinates: 39°25′4.15″N 91°27′26.55″W

Links
- Public license information: Public file; LMS
- Webcast: Listen live
- Website: www.realtalk933.com

KVMO (104.3 FM) is a radio station serving Northeast Missouri and parts of Western Illinois, including the Hannibal–Quincy micropolitan area as a carrier for "The Real Talk Radio Network", a conservative talk radio network based at KRTK. KVMO is licensed to East Central Broadcasting of Washington, Missouri, and broadcasts from a tower 8 miles north of Vandalia, Missouri.

== History ==
KVMO had the call letters KKAC from 2001 to 2019; and from 2001 to 2012 was originally a country music station called "Action Country". In 2012, the station went back on the air briefly as a soft adult contemporary station dubbed "The Oasis"; which gave way to an adult album rock format called "104.3 FMX" from 2013 to 2016, when the station was forced into receivership and went off the air.

Up until the end of December 2018, KVMO was airing a format of adult album alternative rock, but in late January 2019 switched to a simulcast of country music station KFAV from Warrenton, Missouri; and several months later started relaying sister station KWUL in Elsberry, Missouri, with a hybrid format of classic rock and Americana music. The former "V104.3" adult alternative rock format which KVMO aired form Fall 2017 through January 2019 was available through 2020 with many of the same hosts as an online only radio station.

In July 2021, it was announced that KVMO would simulcast 93.3 FM; now known as KRTK, this time airing a conservative talk format, branding as "RealTalk 93.3". With the expansion of "Real Talk" to other frequencies, in November 2021, the group of stations were called "The Real Talk Radio Network".
