= Harford Field =

Airport in Wyoming, United States of America

- IATA: none; ICAO: KHAD; FAA LID: HAD

Summary
- Airport type: Public
- Owner: J.L. Irwin, Jr. / Robin Irwin
- Serves: Casper, Wyoming
- Elevation AMSL: 5,370 ft (1,640 m)
- Coordinates: 42°55′28″N 106°18′34″W
- Interactive map of Harford Field

Runways
Direction	Length		Surface
Direction	ft	m	Surface
7/25	3,810	1,161	Dirt

Statistics (2023)
- Aircraft operations (year ending 7/31/2023): 2,500
- Based aircraft: 15
- Source: Federal Aviation Administration

Harford Field (ICAO: KHAD, FAA LID: HAD) is a privately owned public-use airport six miles north of Casper, in Natrona County, Wyoming.

Most U.S. airports use the same three-letter location identifier for the FAA and IATA, but this airport is HAD to the FAA and has no IATA code (IATA assigned HAD to Halmstad Airport in Halmstad, Sweden).

== Facilities ==
Harford Field covers 115 acres (47 ha) at an elevation of 5,370 feet (1,637 m). Its single runway, 7/25, is 3,810 by 30 feet (1,161 x 9 m) dirt.

In the year ending July 31, 2023, the airport had 2,500 general aviation aircraft operations. 15 single engine aircraft were then based at this airport.

== See also ==
- List of airports in Wyoming
