= KDHX (AM) =

Radio station in St. Louis, Missouri

Simulcasting KRTK, Hermann, Missouri
- St. Louis, Missouri; United States
- Broadcast area: Greater St. Louis
- Frequency: 1010 kHz
- Branding: The Real Talk Radio Network

Programming
- Format: Conservative talk radio
- Affiliations: Townhall News; Salem Radio Network; Westwood One

Ownership
- Owner: Louis Eckelkamp; (East Central Broadcasting, LLC)
- Operator: Ellis Media & Broadcasting
- Sister stations: KQDZ; KRTE-FM; KRTK; KVMO; KWUL

History
- First air date: May 10, 1951
- Former call signs: KJCF (1951–1959); KXEN (1959–2025)
- Call sign meaning: "Double Helix Corporation" (former owner of the former KDHX)

Technical information
- Licensing authority: FCC
- Facility ID: 54739
- Class: D
- Power: 160 watts (day); 14 watts (night)
- Transmitter coordinates: 38°45′46″N 90°3′35″W (day); 38°46′1″N 90°3′32″W (night)
- Translator: 100.7 K264CY (St. Louis)

Links
- Public license information: Public file; LMS
- Webcast: Listen live
- Website: https://realtalk933.com

KDHX (1010 AM) is a commercial radio station licensed to St. Louis, Missouri. The station is owned by Louis Eckelkamp, through licensee East Central Broadcasting, LLC, and operated by Ellis Media & Broadcasting. It simulcasts a conservative talk format with co-owned KRTK (93.3 FM). The studios and offices are on Hampton Avenue in St. Louis. The AM transmitter is located near the Interstate 255/Illinois Route 255/Interstate 270 intersection in Pontoon Beach, Illinois.

KDHX programming is simulcast over low-power FM translator K264CY on 100.7 MHz.

== History ==
KDHX is considered a "move-in" station, originally licensed to Festus, Missouri, about 25 miles south of St. Louis. On May 10, 1951, the station first signed on the air. Its call sign was KJCF, a 250-watt daytimer owned by Jefferson County Radio and TV, Inc.

In 1959, the station was acquired by Garrett Broadcasting. The call sign was changed to KXEN and the studios and offices moved to the Congress Hotel in St. Louis, broadcasting a mix of southern gospel music and preaching programs. The signal was boosted to 50,000 watts to target the Greater St. Louis radio market, but the station still had to sign-off at sunset to avoid interfering with the Class A Canadian stations. (Another station, now KJFF, signed on in Festus on AM 1400, supplying local programming for that community, using the KJCF call letters.)

In the 1970s, the station officially changed to a "hyphenated" city of license, Festus-St. Louis, for its legal identification. In the early 1990s, KXEN got authorization for nighttime operation, at 500 watts.

In July 2002, BDJ Radio Enterprises acquired KXEN. It continued its Christian talk and teaching format. A short time later, the city of license was changed again, this time to only St. Louis, no longer needing to mention Festus in the legal identification.

On October 27, 2021, KXEN switched to a conservative talk format known as "Real Talk." It began simulcasting KRTK 93.3 FM to improve its coverage in the St. Louis City area. With the expansion of "Real Talk" to other frequencies, in November 2021, the group of stations was called "The Real Talk Radio Network".

Effective May 8, 2023, BDJ Radio Enterprises sold KXEN and translator K264CY to Louis Eckelkamp's East Central Broadcasting. Its callsign was changed to KDHX on December 1, 2025.
