= KSGM =

- Chester, Illinois; United States
- Frequency: 980 kHz

Programming
- Format: Classic country
- Affiliations: Westwood One Country

Ownership
- Owner: Donze Communications
- Sister stations: KBDZ

History
- Call sign meaning: Ste. Genevieve, Missouri

Technical information
- Licensing authority: FCC
- Facility ID: 17305
- Class: B
- Power: 1,000 watts day; 470 watts night
- Transmitter coordinates: 37°47′16.00″N 89°54′21.00″W
- Translator: (105.3 MHz) K287CE (Ste. Genevieve, Missouri)

Links
- Public license information: Public file; LMS
- Website: Official website

KSGM (980 AM) is a radio station in Chester, Illinois, broadcasting a classic country format. The station is owned by Donze Communications.

== History ==
KSGM transmitted its first broadcast on July 5, 1947, from Ste. Genevieve, Missouri. KSGM was located at 1450 on the AM dial with a power output of 250 watts. KSGM's pioneer broadcasting schedule included local news of interest to the Chester community, religious broadcasts from St. John Evangelical Lutheran Church, sports from Chester High School and special programming from Menard Correctional Center.

KSGM's friendship with the Chester community continued to grow and as early as 1954, KSGM established studios in the First Bank Building in downtown Chester.

In 1961, KSGM was relicensed to Chester. KSGM also changed frequencies from 1450 to 980 kHz, and increased power to 1,000 watts.

KSGM serves a wider area in Southern Illinois and Southeast Missouri with entertainment and information.

KSGM provides live sports coverage of Chester High School Yellow Jacket sports in addition to sports coverage of St. Vincent Catholic, Perryville, Ste. Genevieve and Valle Catholic High Schools in Missouri.

In November 2016, KSGM flipped formats from mainstream country to classic country. The station now uses the moniker "The River Region's Legend" since it is the oldest station in southeast Missouri and southern Illinois. Station owners promoted Brian "Gritty" Snider to program director and station image director.
