= KRTE-FM =

Radio station in Steelville, Missouri

Simulcasts KRTK Hermann
- Steelville, Missouri; United States
- Broadcast area: Rolla, Missouri
- Frequency: 107.3 MHz
- Branding: The Real Talk Radio Network

Programming
- Format: Conservative talk
- Affiliations: Salem Radio Network; Townhall News

Ownership
- Owner: East Central Broadcasting
- Operator: Ellis Media & Broadcasting
- Sister stations: KRTK; KVMO; KWUL; KQDZ; KDHX

History
- First air date: September 12, 2007 (as KESY)
- Former call signs: KESY (2002–2010); KLPW-FM (2010–2021)
- Call sign meaning: similar to KRTK

Technical information
- Licensing authority: FCC
- Facility ID: 79236
- Class: C3
- ERP: 8,900 watts
- HAAT: 165 meters (541 ft)
- Transmitter coordinates: 37.921°N 91.443°W

Links
- Public license information: Public file; LMS
- Webcast: Listen live
- Website: www.realtalk933.com

KRTE-FM (107.3 MHz) is a conservative talk radio radio station serving the city of Rolla, Missouri.

Originally licensed to serve Cuba, Missouri, in February 2007, the license holder applied to change the city of license to Steelville, Missouri, which was the location of KQQX, a station owned by Twenty-One Sound Communications.

The FCC revoked the station's STA authority (allowing it to remain silent) on April 10, 2007. The station was granted its operating license on September 12, 2007, based on the original city of license of Cuba.

On August 2, 2012, the FCC granted KLPW-FM special temporary authority to operate from a new location at a reduced height and power. On August 13, 2012, KLPW-FM returned to the air with sports talk programming from ESPN Radio.

On October 2, 2015, the station was approved to move its community of license from Cuba to Steelville at increased power.

In late October 2021, KLPW-FM started simulcasting KRTK "Real Talk 93.3" for coverage in the Rolla area; new KRTE-FM call letters followed on December 15. With the expansion of "Real Talk" to other frequencies, the group of stations began calling itself "The Real Talk Radio Network".
