= WQQW (Illinois) =

Radio station in Highland, Illinois (1998–2019)

Highland, Illinois; United States
- Broadcast area: Madison County; Bond County; Clinton County; St. Clair County; Greater St. Louis (limited)
- Frequency: 1510 kHz

Ownership
- Owner: Entertainment Media Trust; (Entertainment Media Trust, Dennis J. Watkins, Trustee)
- Operator: Insane Broadcasting Company
- Sister stations: KFTK, KQQZ, KZQZ

History
- First air date: May 19, 1998
- Last air date: March 5, 2019
- Former call signs: WBDI (1998–1999); WCBW (1999–2001); WINU (2001); WDID (2001–2006); WXOZ (2006–2009)

Technical information
- Facility ID: 90598
- Class: D
- Power: 1,000 watts (daytime)
- Transmitter coordinates: 38°44′56″N 89°34′10″W

WQQW was a commercial daytime-only radio station that was licensed to serve Highland, Illinois, at 1510 AM, and broadcast from 1998 to 2019. The station's transmitter site was located in the town of Pierron, Illinois.

The station's license was revoked by the Federal Communications Commission on March 20, 2020, after it was revealed that the principal ownership—Entertainment Media Trust—was set up as a shell company for a convicted felon. This license cancellation also included three other AM stations in the Greater St. Louis metropolitan area owned by the group: KFTK (1490 AM), KQQZ and KZQZ.

== History ==
Originally licensed on May 19, 1998, WINU became WDID on June 14, 2001; WDID changed to WXOZ on May 11, 2006; and finally WXOZ changed to the current WQQW on November 18, 2009.

On March 4, 2019, WQQW went silent, citing a transmitter prone to turning itself off for unknown reasons and issues with the internet delivery of its programming to the transmitter site.

In 2012, Mark Kern challenged the license renewals of WQQW and its sister stations, alleging that Robert Romanik, a convicted felon who is also known as the "Grim Reaper of Radio", was controlling the stations in violation of FCC rules that prohibit felons from owning broadcast stations and had arranged a local marketing agreement for one of them. On June 5, 2019, the Federal Communications Commission designated all four EMT stations' licenses for hearing, finding that Romanik had established EMT and provided all the funding to acquire its stations even though he was not a party to any FCC applications.

The station's license was cancelled on March 20, 2020.

== FCC Auction 109 ==
The FCC announced on February 8, 2021, that the former EMT-licensed AM allocations in the St. Louis market, including WQQW's frequency, would go up for auction on July 27, 2021. The day after the auction process started, blank applications for new stations, using the facility ID numbers for WQQW and KFTK, appeared in the FCC database. No bids were received for any of the four frequencies during the eight-day auction.
