= KFTK (AM) =

Radio station in East St. Louis, Illinois (1972–2020)

- East St. Louis, Illinois; United States
- Broadcast area: Greater St. Louis
- Frequency: 1490 kHz

Ownership
- Owner: Entertainment Media Trust; (Entertainment Media Trust, Dennis J. Watkins, Trustee)
- Operator: Entercom
- Sister stations: WQQW; KQQZ; KZQZ

History
- First air date: July 10, 1972
- Last air date: March 20, 2020
- Former call signs: WESL (1972–2007); WFFX (2007–2010); WQQX (2010–2016)
- Call sign meaning: shared with KFTK-FM

Technical information
- Licensing authority: FCC
- Facility ID: 72815
- Class: C
- Power: 1,000 watts (day); 1,000 watts (night)
- Transmitter coordinates: 38°37′16.2″N 90°9′36″W
- Translator: 98.7 K254CR (St. Louis)

Links
- Public license information: Public file; LMS

KFTK was a commercial radio station that was licensed to East St. Louis, Illinois, on 1490 AM, and broadcast from 1972 to 2020. KFTK's transmitter was located in East St. Louis. From 2016 to 2020, KFTK and low-power translator K254CR (98.7 FM) were operated by both Emmis Communications and Entercom as a full-time simulcast of KFTK-FM (97.1).

The station's license was revoked by the Federal Communications Commission after it was revealed that its principal owner, Entertainment Media Trust (doing business as Insane Broadcasting), was set up as a shell company for a convicted felon. The cancellation also included three other AM stations in the Greater St. Louis metropolitan area: KQQZ, KZQZ and WQQW.

== History ==
The station was first licensed in 1972 as WESL. The 1490 kHz frequency was previously occupied in East St. Louis by WAMV, which operated from 1935 until 1964.

In July 2007, WESL changed its format from oldies to sports talk and its call letters to WFFX. In July 2009, WFFX dropped Fox Sports Radio, including Dan Patrick and Jim Rome, and changed to "urban sports talk" as what may be the nation's first sports talk format with only African-American hosts. Richard "Onion" Horton is a veteran of St. Louis radio.

On January 19, 2010, the station again changed call signs, this time to WQQX. In February 2010, WQQX changed formats from sports talk to adult standards. In December 2011, WQQX flipped to a rhythmic oldies format.

In March 2014, the station returned to the sports format. During its second incarnation with the format, WQQX aired local shows, Fox Sports Radio, and the Big Ten Network's BTN Live Radio show.

WQQX began simulcasting news/talk station KFTK-FM (97.1 FM) on September 15, 2016; concurrently, WQQX added a translator station, K254CR (98.7 FM) in St. Louis. The translator had been acquired by Emmis Communications, KFTK-FM's owner, from Cornerstone Community Radio earlier in 2016 and relocated from Atlanta, Illinois, to be used by WQQX. The simulcast allowed KFTK-FM (whose transmitter is located in O'Fallon, Missouri, west of St. Louis) to improve its coverage of the Illinois side of the market and downtown St. Louis. The call letters were changed to KFTK on September 16, 2016.

In 2012, St. Clair County board chairman Mark Kern challenged the license renewals of then-WQQX and its sister stations. Kern charged that Robert Romanik, a convicted felon who is also known as the "Grim Reaper of Radio", was controlling the stations in violation of FCC rules that prohibit felons from owning broadcast stations and had been involved in creating the local marketing agreement between Emmis and EMT/Insane to operate the 1490 frequency. According to a 2012 article in Riverfront Times, Romanik was officially listed as a "consultant" to EMT/Insane, but held the real power. On June 5, 2019, following a seven-year investigation, the Federal Communications Commission's Media Bureau designated all four EMT stations' licenses for hearing. The FCC found Romanik had established EMT, provided all the funding to acquire its stations, and identified himself as a radio station owner on forms disclosing political donations even though he was not a party to any FCC applications.

On March 20, 2020, the station's license was deleted by the Federal Communications Commission; K254CR would serve as a direct rebroadcast of KFTK-FM until March 22, 2021, when Entercom converted it to an FM translator for KMOX.

== FCC Auction 109 ==
The FCC announced on February 8, 2021, that the former EMT-licensed AM allocations in the St. Louis market, including KFTK's frequency, would go up for auction on July 27, 2021. The day after the auction process started, blank applications for new stations, using the facility ID numbers for KFTK and WQQW, appeared in the FCC database. No bids were received for any of the four frequencies during the eight-day auction.
