= KFNS-FM =

Radio station in Troy–St. Louis, Missouri

- Troy, Missouri; United States
- Broadcast area: St. Louis, Missouri
- Frequency: 100.7 MHz
- Branding: 100.7 FM The Viper

Programming
- Format: Mainstream rock

Ownership
- Owner: Viper Broadcasting, LLC

History
- First air date: November 29, 1993
- Former call signs: KZMM (1992–1999)
- Call sign meaning: "Fans"; from former simulcast of KFNS (590 AM)

Technical information
- Licensing authority: FCC
- Facility ID: 29944
- Class: A
- ERP: 6,000 watts
- HAAT: 99.3 meters (326 ft)
- Transmitter coordinates: 39°3′10.5″N 90°59′40.9″W

Links
- Public license information: Public file; LMS
- Webcast: Listen live
- Website: viperrocks.com

KFNS-FM (100.7 MHz, "The Viper") is a radio station broadcasting a mainstream rock format. Licensed to Troy, Missouri, United States, the station serves Greater St. Louis, with an effective radiated power of 6,000 watts and studios located in Lake St. Louis, Missouri. The station is owned by Viper Broadcasting, LLC.

== History ==
The station went on the air November 29, 1993, as KZMM, a country music station. It became KFNS-FM, a simulcast of sports radio station KFNS (590 AM), in 1999, concurrent with a $1.25 million sale by James Magee to KFNS owner Missouri Sports Radio.

On July 15, 2009, KFNS-FM began broadcasting an adult hits format, similar to local station WARH. As of September 2009, KFNS-FM changed formats once again, playing a more aggressive adult hits format known as "Westplex 100.7-- Playing Whatever We Feel Like". On December 29, 2011, KFNS-FM changed formats once gain, this time to hot adult contemporary, also as "Westplex 100.7".

On December 27, 2012, KFNS-FM changed its format to active rock, branded as "The Viper". As 100.7 The Viper, KFNS-FM has grown the audience size to new levels according to St Louis area magazine "Full Throttle", and has become one of the most-listened to stations in the Westplex, as the December 2014 issue reported on the growth in listenership for "100.7 The Viper".

On April 3, 2016, Inside Radio reports that DC, one of the original "Morning Hangover" hosts, had reached a deal that would see him return to mornings on KFNS-FM in the same hosting role he held previously from 2013 to 2015. According to reports, Eric Johnson (mornings) and Chris Knight (DC's original morning co-host) were very vocal supporters of DC, and lobbied hard for his return to the station, much like his many loyal followers and listeners. The morning show is in the top spot as of February 2017. Per several industry sources and reported by industry newsletter NOW in early April.

On May 7, 2017, a St. Louis Market Report released, according to Inside Radio, with "The Morning Hangover" with DC, Eric, Zav & Ricki (joining from crosstown WARH) rated #1 Men 18-49 & 25-54 and Persons 25–54 in St. Charles, Lincoln and Warren counties. The Feb-Mar-Apr 2017 listenership data was used for the article.

July 12, 2016, The Morning Hangover host, DC, recognized by top radio publication All Access Music Group Rock Radio Personality Of The Month. All Access featured a profile of DC, which documented his move from Birmingham, Ala. to St. Louis, Mo. to host a morning show in a large market, at the age of 17 years old. The story also spent time highlighting his morning ratings success on WKKX, WKBQ-FM, KIHT and KFNS-FM, achieving #1 status Persons 18- 34, 18-49 and 25-54 consistently during his 25 years on the morning airwaves of St. Louis radio.

In 2022, audio of morning show host Vic Faust making insulting remarks to a co-host went viral. This resulted in Faust being dismissed from KFNS-FM and his job as anchor at KTVI.
