= KLPW (AM) =

- Union, Missouri; United States
- Frequency: 1220 kHz

Programming
- Format: Americana

Ownership
- Owner: Broadcast Properties, Inc.

History
- First air date: August 18, 1954

Technical information
- Licensing authority: FCC
- Facility ID: 70303
- Class: D
- Power: 1,000 watts day 126 watts night
- Transmitter coordinates: 38.4819°N 91.044°W
- Translator: 92.7 K224EZ (Union)

Links
- Public license information: Public file; LMS
- Webcast: Listen live
- Website: klpw.com

KLPW (1220 AM) is a radio station licensed to Union, Missouri, United States, with studios located just south of Krakow, Missouri. The station airs an Americana music format, and is owned by Broadcast Properties, Inc. The station transitioned to its current format from talk radio in July 2017.
