= KWUL (AM) =

Radio station in St. Louis, Missouri, US

- St. Louis, Missouri; United States
- Broadcast area: Greater St. Louis
- Frequency: 920 kHz
- Branding: K-Wulf

Programming
- Format: Americana

Ownership
- Owner: Louis Eckelkamp; (East Central Broadcasting, LLC)
- Sister stations: KDHX; KRTE-FM; KRTK; KQDZ; KVMO

History
- First air date: December 1, 1961
- Former call signs: WGNU (1961–2023)
- Call sign meaning: "K-Wulf"

Technical information
- Licensing authority: FCC
- Facility ID: 49042
- Class: B
- Power: 450 watts day; 500 watts night
- Transmitter coordinates: 38°45′33.2″N 90°3′0.4″W (NAD 83)
- Translator: 101.5 K268CT (St. Louis)

Links
- Public license information: Public file; LMS
- Website: kwulf.com

KWUL (920 kHz) is a commercial AM radio station licensed to St. Louis, Missouri, and serving the Greater St. Louis media market. The station is owned by Louis Eckelkamp, through licensee East Central Broadcasting, LLC. KWUL airs an Americana radio format. The studios and offices are on Hampton Avenue in St. Louis.

KWUL is a Class B station. It transmits with 450 watts by day and 500 watts at night. Its transmitter is near the Interstate 255/Illinois Route 255/Interstate 270 interchange, off Chain of Rocks Road in Edwardsville, Illinois. Programming is also heard on FM translator K268CT, 101.5 MHz in St. Louis.

== History ==
=== Talk, Top 40, country ===
The station first signed on the air on December 1, 1961. Its original call sign was WGNU and its city of license was Granite City, Illinois. Founded by Chuck Norman and owned by him for the rest of his life, it was held in trust after his 2004 death. Under Norman's ownership, the station featured a wide-ranging local talk radio format. Norman also signed on WGNU-FM 106.5 on November 24, 1965.

For a time, WGNU had a Top 40 format, then changed to country music. It later tried talk shows aimed at the African-American community.

=== Gospel, sports and urban talk ===
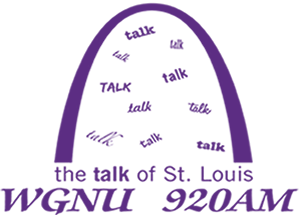
Logo as a talk station

WGNU was sold to Radio Property Ventures, owners of KXEN, on September 26, 2007. WGNU switched to an urban gospel format.

Former KFNS host Tim McKernan and his company, InsideSTL Enterprises, bought the weekday air time on WGNU, and the station switched its weekday programming to sports radio talk on August 1, 2013. The weekday schedule consisted of 11 hours of local shows, as well as programming from CBS Sports Radio. The urban talk format continued to air on weekends. This lease agreement ended in September 2016, when insideSTL Enterprises took over the operations of KFNS and moved its programming onto that station.

=== Controversy ===
The station briefly made national headlines. Former St. Louis Cardinals player Jack Clark, who cohosted "The King and the Ripper" with longtime St. Louis radio personality Kevin "the King" Slaten, claimed Los Angeles Angels slugger Albert Pujols had used performance-enhancing drugs (PEDs) while Pujols was with the Cardinals. Clark had been the Cardinals' hitting coach during the early part of Pujols' 12-year tenure in St. Louis. Clark had said that he talked to Pujols' former personal trainer and said that "I know for a fact he was" using PEDs.

Pujols responded by threatening Clark and WGNU with a defamation lawsuit, and vehemently denied that he had ever used PEDs. The trainer added that he hadn't even talked to Clark in over ten years. InsideSTL cut ties with Clark and Slaten after only seven shows. It also issued an apology to Pujols.

=== Sports betting ===
In 2018, the station's community of license was changed from Granite City to St. Louis, Missouri.

On October 12, 2021, WGNU changed its format from brokered programming to sports gambling, branded as "The Game". It used programming from the VSiN Sports Betting Network, based in Las Vegas.

=== Americana ===
In early 2023, it switched to a simulcast of KWUL-FM 101.7 in Elsberry, Missouri. The stations are running a mix of Southern-influenced classic rock and Americana music.

On March 27, 2023, the station changed its call sign to KWUL. Effective May 8, 2023, Radio Property Ventures sold KWUL, KXEN, and translator K264CY to Louis Eckelkamp's East Central Broadcasting for $210,000.
