= KBDZ =

Radio station in Perryville, Missouri

- Perryville, Missouri; United States
- Broadcast area: St. Louis; Cape Girardeau
- Frequency: 93.1 MHz
- Branding: Classic Rock 93.1

Programming
- Format: Classic rock
- Affiliations: Westwood One

Ownership
- Owner: Donze Communications
- Sister stations: KSGM

History
- First air date: November 29, 1989
- Former call signs: KRAA (1989–1990)

Technical information
- Licensing authority: FCC
- Facility ID: 15022
- Class: C1
- ERP: 36,000 watts
- HAAT: 175 meters (574 ft)
- Transmitter coordinates: 37°52′58″N 90°10′20″W

Links
- Public license information: Public file; LMS
- Webcast: Listen live
- Website: classicrock931.com

KBDZ (93.1 FM) is a commercial radio station licensed to Perryville, Missouri, United States, serving St. Louis and Cape Girardeau. Owned by Donze Communications, it features a classic rock format.

== History ==
=== Early years ===
The station signed on the air as KRAA on November 29, 1989. On September 21, 1990, the station changed its call sign to KBDZ.

When the station first went on the air, KBDZ was playing soft rock music. That changed after the Flood of 1993. The station dropped the soft rock format and switched to country music after sister station KSGM AM 980 went dark because of the damage to the transmitter site in Perry County, Missouri.

The local news and sports programming were also switched to KBDZ. In addition, the station became the local network affiliate for St. Louis Cardinals baseball and St. Louis Blues hockey.

=== Signal upgrade ===
Prior to a change in format, KBDZ was given permission to upgrade its signal with the construction of a tower in Weingarten, Missouri. The construction permit allowed KBDZ to increase the effective radiated power (ERP) from 6,000 watts to 50,000 watts. An additional change to 36,000 watts using a higher tower was later approved.

However with the upgrade, the station was forced to move Cardinal baseball to sister station KSGM AM 980 because of the FM signal's penetration into the St. Louis radio market and overlap with Cardinals flagship station 1120 KMOX. KSGM AM would eventually drop St. Louis Blues hockey but added the team back to the station's sports lineup in October 2019.

=== Switch to Classic Rock ===
Then, in November 2013, KBDZ switched from "B931 Country" to "Classic Rock 93.1". The station featured longtime Missouri and Illinois radio personality JC Corcoran’s “The Morning Showgram”.

On February 15, 2016, Corcoran debuted on KBDZ during the morning drive time slot. The show lasted for five years. On June 8, 2021, KBDZ announced through its official Facebook page that Donze Communications and JC Corcoran were parting ways, due to a variety of reasons that were staying private. But the station said the decision was in relation to Corcoran “inaccurately and unfairly attacking personnel”.

== Programming ==
Local personalities on KBDZ include Katy Kruze, Michelle Holliday, Zav, "Radio" Rich Dalton, Paul Brown, Blackstock and Ted Habeck .
