= Elsberry, Missouri =

- City
- Elsberry in September 2026

- Location of Elsberry, Missouri
- Coordinates: 39°10′06″N 90°47′16″W
- Country: United States
- State: Missouri
- County: Lincoln
- Incorporated: 1883

Area
  - Total: 1.51 sq mi (3.91 km^{2})
  - Land: 1.51 sq mi (3.91 km^{2})
  - Water: 0 sq mi (0.00 km^{2})
- Elevation: 486 ft (148 m)

Population (2020)
  - Total: 1,937
  - Density: 1,282.2/sq mi (495.05/km^{2})
- Time zone: UTC-6 (Central (CST))
  - Summer (DST): UTC-5 (CDT)
- ZIP code: 63343
- Area code: 573
- FIPS code: 29-22114
- GNIS feature ID: 2394678
- Website: cityofelsberry.com

Elsberry is a city in Lincoln County, Missouri, United States. The population was 2,123 as of 2020 United States census

== History ==
Elsberry was laid out in 1871, and named after one of its founders, Robert T. Elsberry. The town site was platted in 1879. A post office called Elsberry has been in operation since 1879.

== Geography ==
According to the United States Census Bureau, the city has a total area of 1.63 square miles (4.22 km^{2}), all land.

=== Climate ===
Climate data for Elsberry, Missouri (1991–2020 normals, extremes 1931–present)
Month	Jan	Feb	Mar	Apr	May	Jun	Jul	Aug	Sep	Oct	Nov	Dec	Year
Record high °F (°C)	78 (26)	81 (27)	88 (31)	94 (34)	102 (39)	107 (42)	116 (47)	110 (43)	105 (41)	95 (35)	88 (31)	77 (25)	116 (47)
Mean daily maximum °F (°C)	37.7 (3.2)	43.3 (6.3)	54.9 (12.7)	66.9 (19.4)	75.2 (24.0)	83.4 (28.6)	86.8 (30.4)	85.1 (29.5)	78.5 (25.8)	67.3 (19.6)	53.7 (12.1)	41.4 (5.2)	64.5 (18.1)
Daily mean °F (°C)	28.7 (−1.8)	33.3 (0.7)	43.7 (6.5)	54.8 (12.7)	64.2 (17.9)	72.8 (22.7)	76.4 (24.7)	74.5 (23.6)	67.1 (19.5)	55.9 (13.3)	43.5 (6.4)	32.9 (0.5)	54.0 (12.2)
Mean daily minimum °F (°C)	19.7 (−6.8)	23.3 (−4.8)	32.5 (0.3)	42.7 (5.9)	53.2 (11.8)	62.1 (16.7)	66.0 (18.9)	64.0 (17.8)	55.7 (13.2)	44.4 (6.9)	33.4 (0.8)	24.4 (−4.2)	43.4 (6.3)
Record low °F (°C)	−24 (−31)	−24 (−31)	−14 (−26)	16 (−9)	28 (−2)	38 (3)	40 (4)	39 (4)	26 (−3)	14 (−10)	−7 (−22)	−23 (−31)	−24 (−31)
Average precipitation inches (mm)	2.35 (60)	2.21 (56)	3.20 (81)	4.40 (112)	5.00 (127)	4.17 (106)	4.24 (108)	3.16 (80)	3.49 (89)	3.28 (83)	3.28 (83)	2.47 (63)	41.25 (1,048)
Average snowfall inches (cm)	5.1 (13)	4.5 (11)	2.4 (6.1)	0.2 (0.51)	0.0 (0.0)	0.0 (0.0)	0.0 (0.0)	0.0 (0.0)	0.0 (0.0)	0.0 (0.0)	0.7 (1.8)	3.4 (8.6)	16.3 (41)
Average precipitation days (≥ 0.01 in)	7.7	7.4	9.4	10.1	11.6	8.5	7.3	6.4	6.9	7.5	7.2	7.4	97.4
Average snowy days (≥ 0.1 in)	3.2	3.1	1.4	0.2	0.0	0.0	0.0	0.0	0.0	0.0	0.6	2.2	10.7
Source: NOAA

== Demographics ==
Historical population
Census	Pop.	Note	%±
1930	197		—
1940	1,548		685.8%
1950	1,565		1.1%
1960	1,491		−4.7%
1970	1,398		−6.2%
1980	1,272		−9.0%
1990	1,898		49.2%
2000	2,047		7.9%
2010	1,934		−5.5%
2020	1,937		0.2%
U.S. Decennial Census

=== 2020 census ===
As of the 2020 census, Elsberry had a population of 1,937. The median age was 36.5 years. 26.1% of residents were under the age of 18 and 16.3% of residents were 65 years of age or older. For every 100 females there were 93.1 males, and for every 100 females age 18 and over there were 89.5 males age 18 and over.

0.0% of residents lived in urban areas, while 100.0% lived in rural areas.

There were 776 households in Elsberry, of which 31.4% had children under the age of 18 living in them. Of all households, 42.0% were married-couple households, 19.7% were households with a male householder and no spouse or partner present, and 29.6% were households with a female householder and no spouse or partner present. About 31.3% of all households were made up of individuals and 14.9% had someone living alone who was 65 years of age or older.

There were 870 housing units, of which 10.8% were vacant. The homeowner vacancy rate was 1.8% and the rental vacancy rate was 5.9%.

Racial composition as of the 2020 census
Race	Number	Percent
White	1,719	88.7%
Black or African American	49	2.5%
American Indian and Alaska Native	14	0.7%
Asian	5	0.3%
Native Hawaiian and Other Pacific Islander	1	0.1%
Some other race	6	0.3%
Two or more races	143	7.4%
Hispanic or Latino (of any race)	54	2.8%

=== 2010 census ===
As of the census of 2010, there were 1,934 people, 808 households, and 517 families living in the city. The population density was 1,186.5 inhabitants per square mile (458.1/km^{2}). There were 939 housing units at an average density of 576.1 per square mile (222.4/km^{2}). The racial makeup of the city was 94.1% White, 2.4% African American, 1.0% Native American, 0.6% from other races, and 1.9% from two or more races. Hispanic or Latino of any race were 2.0% of the population.

There were 808 households, of which 31.4% had children under the age of 18 living with them, 43.8% were married couples living together, 14.6% had a female householder with no husband present, 5.6% had a male householder with no wife present, and 36.0% were non-families. 30.8% of all households were made up of individuals, and 13.8% had someone living alone who was 65 years of age or older. The average household size was 2.39 and the average family size was 2.97.

The median age in the city was 38.4 years. 24.3% of residents were under the age of 18; 10.1% were between the ages of 18 and 24; 23.3% were from 25 to 44; 26.9% were from 45 to 64; and 15.6% were 65 years of age or older. The gender makeup of the city was 45.9% male and 54.1% female.

=== 2000 census ===
As of the census of 2000, there were 2,047 people, 779 households, and 552 families living in the city. The population density was 1,751.9 inhabitants per square mile (676.4/km^{2}). There were 889 housing units at an average density of 760.9 per square mile (293.8/km^{2}). The racial makeup of the city was 93.65% White, 3.27% African American, 0.64% Native American, 0.15% Asian, 0.64% from other races, and 1.66% from two or more races. Hispanic or Latino of any race were 1.95% of the population.

There were 779 households, out of which 38.3% had children under the age of 18 living with them, 49.7% were married couples living together, 15.3% had a female householder with no husband present, and 29.1% were non-families. 24.4% of all households were made up of individuals, and 11.2% had someone living alone who was 65 years of age or older. The average household size was 2.63 and the average family size was 3.09.

In the city the population was spread out, with 31.4% under the age of 18, 8.7% from 18 to 24, 26.9% from 25 to 44, 19.9% from 45 to 64, and 13.2% who were 65 years of age or older. The median age was 34 years. For every 100 females, there were 87.8 males. For every 100 females age 18 and over, there were 89.6 males.

The median income for a household in the city was $27,917, and the median income for a family was $32,188. Males had a median income of $30,896 versus $20,119 for females. The per capita income for the city was $14,615. About 14.7% of families and 14.7% of the population were below the poverty line, including 18.5% of those under age 18 and 8.8% of those age 65 or over.

== Education ==
Elsberry R-II School District, which covers the municipality, operates one elementary school, one middle school and Elsberry High School.

The town has a lending library, the Joseph R. Palmer Family Memorial Library.

== Notable people ==
- Clarence Cannon, congressman; lived in Elsberry as a boy
- Marc Hill, Major League Baseball player; born in Elsberry in 1952
