= KLIS (AM) =

Radio station in Wood River, Illinois (1961–2026)

- Wood River, Illinois; United States
- Broadcast area: Greater St. Louis
- Frequency: 590 KHz

Ownership
- Owner: Dave Greene; (Big Toe Media LLC)

History
- First air date: October 5, 1961
- Last air date: March 3, 2026
- Former call signs: WBBY (1961–1965); WRTH (1965–1988); WKLL (1988–1989); WCEO (1989–1991); KEZK (1991–1993); KFNS (1993–2025)
- Call sign meaning: Lou Information Station

Technical information
- Facility ID: 13505
- Class: B
- Power: 1,000 watts
- Transmitter coordinates: 38°55′43.2″N 90°5′8.4″W

KLIS (590 AM) was a commercial radio station licensed to Wood River, Illinois, United States, and serving Greater St. Louis, operating from 1961 to 2026. Last owned by Big Toe Media LLC, it carried a talk format branded "The Lou Information Station", with studios located in the St. Louis suburb of Kirkwood, Missouri, and transmitter sited in nearby Bethalto, Illinois.

== History ==
=== Early years ===
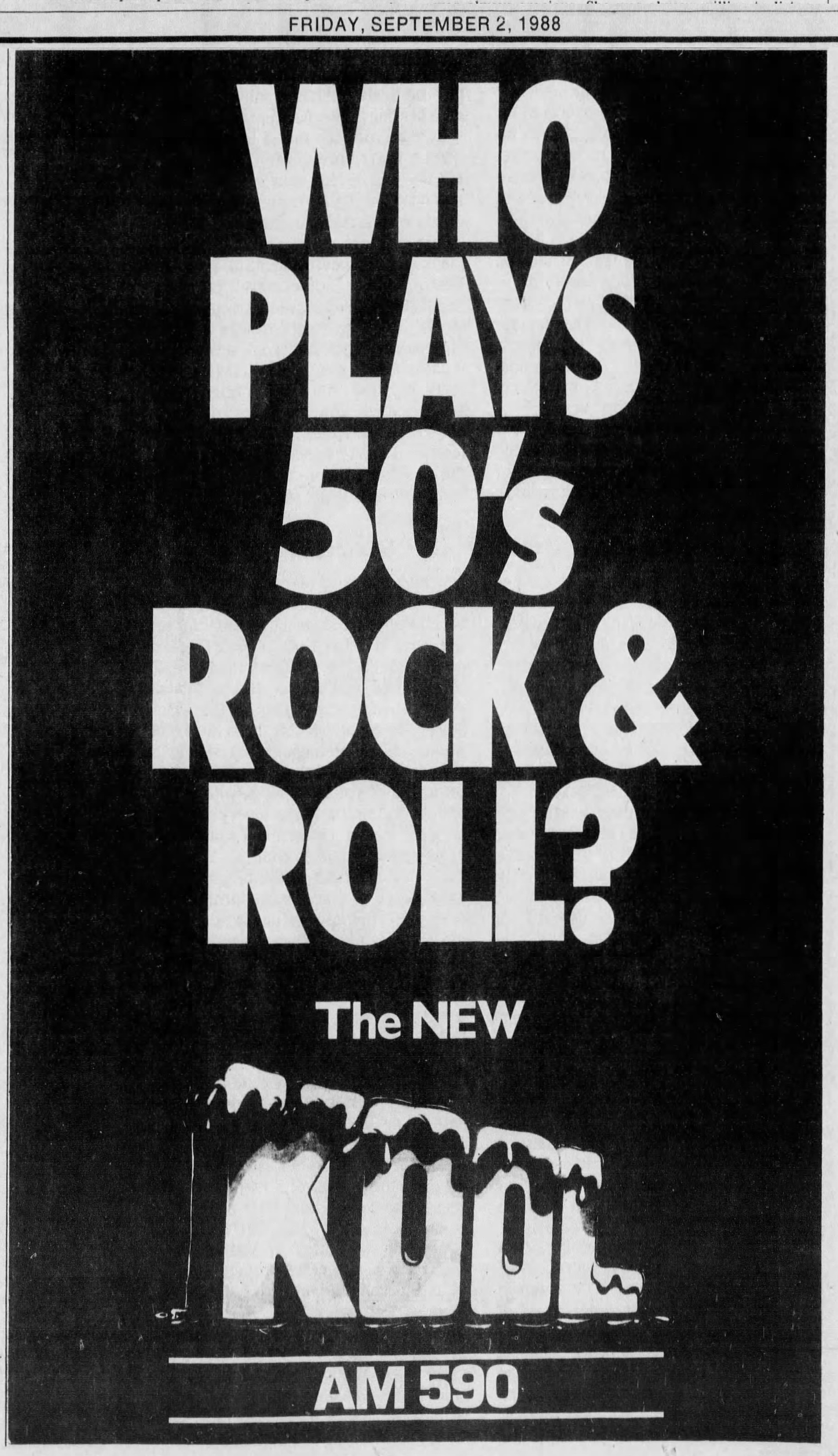
WKLL ad after its transition in early September 1988.

On October 5, 1961, the station first signed on as WBBY, a daytimer broadcasting at 500 watts. WBBY was owned by Madison County Broadcasting Company and served the Wood River area with local news, sports and other programming. It began nighttime operations in 1964. In 1965, WBBY changed its call sign to WRTH and its format switched to beautiful music, targeting the St. Louis market. Its easy listening music format was among the most highly rated stations in St. Louis. Among the best known announcers were Grant Horton, Paul Warner, Frank Akers, Jim Scanlan and Ed Goodman.

In the 1980s, WRTH transitioned to an adult standards format, which it aired until September 1988, when it flipped to oldies as WKLL, Kool 590. On November 1, 1989, the format changed again to all-business news and talk under the call letters WCEO, which stood for Chief Executive Officer. On January 1, 1991, the station adopted an easy listening format with the call sign KEZK adopted that January 29; at the time, Adams Communications Corporation owned both KEZK and KEZK-FM, a soft adult contemporary outlet.

In February 1993, KEZK began simulcasting the soft AC programming of its FM sister station.

=== Move to sports talk ===
KFNS' logo as "590 The Fan", used from 1993 to 2013. A similar logo would be utilized upon the format's relaunch in late 2015 until September 2016.

On April 5, 1993, KEZK switched to a sports radio format as 590 The Fan; the call sign changed to KFNS that July 9. KFNS held the affiliation for One-on-One Sports (now SB Nation Radio), and at different points, had aired St. Louis Steamers indoor soccer, University of Illinois football and men's basketball, the Gateway Grizzlies minor-league baseball team, and selected Mizzou Tigers football and basketball games, along with the weekly "Tiger Talk" radio coaches show. In 2009, KFNS was the radio home for the Frontier League's River City Rascals baseball games; KFNS-FM was the radio home for the club in 2006, before losing out to KSLQ-FM in 2007 and 2008.

KFNS had also broadcast on an FM radio station, KFNS-FM, based in Troy, Missouri, from 1999 until July 15, 2009. It was heard in Lincoln, St. Charles and Warren Counties in eastern Missouri, with the same programming as its AM partner. Currently, 100.7 FM is a classic rock station, known as "100.7 The Viper".

=== Brief experiment as "The Man" ===
On May 1, 2013, KFNS flipped to a talk/comedy format, branded as 590 The Man. In addition, sister station KXFN flipped to a female-centric talk format as 1380 The Woman. In 2014, KFNS shifted back to sports (but retained the "Man" branding), with the previous format shifting over to KXFN as 1380 The X. Its investors included former St. Louis Rams offensive tackle Orlando Pace and former St. Louis Blues player Keith Tkachuk. 1380 The X was subsequently subject to significant turmoil, including lawsuits against the ownership, physical fights behind the scenes and verbal attacks on-air.

KFNS went off the air on October 31, 2014 after the station stopped paying its bills, resulting in the local utility company Ameren turning off the power to its transmitter site. Following the shutdown, Grand Slam Sports announced that the company would focus on sister station KXFN and sell KFNS to a religious group. Since 2009, the station had faced increased competition for the sports radio audience in St. Louis from WXOS, WGNU, and WQQX. After payment was made on the power bill, KFNS resumed broadcasting with NBC Sports Radio programming on November 10, 2014. But shortly afterward, Grand Slam Sports' investors, at the urging of the company's operations manager, chose to again take the station dark until the completion of the sale.

=== Return to sports format ===
The sale to the religious group never followed through. Instead, the station returned to air on November 5, 2015, after being leased out to Markel Radio Group, operators of talkstl.com, which had already been leasing KXFN. TalkSTL programming was simulcast on both stations until December 2015, when KXFN went silent, with KFNS continuing to air TalkSTL programming. The station was sold to Markel Radio Group, effective February 22, 2016, for $300,000.

In September 2016, Markel leased the station's broadcast day to former KFNS host Tim McKernan and his company, InsideSTL Enterprises; McKernan had previously leased WGNU on weekdays. As a result, KFNS took over as St. Louis' CBS Sports Radio and Fox Sports radio affiliate. As part of the lease arrangement, the station's license was transferred to McKernan Radio Group, LLC, which was 75% owned by Markel and 25% owned by McKernan. In 2018, Randy Markel acquired total ownership under Markel Entertainment LLC. In November 2021, Markel sold all interests in KFNS to Zobrist Media LLC and it remains privately held under principal Dave Zobrist. Markel later cited the pandemic and the loss of sports content to cover as the reason for the sale, and noted in July 2024 he was interested in reacquiring the station since then.

On June 27, 2024, Barrett Sports Media reported that the station would shut down at the end of June. Zobrist clarified that the station would remain on the air, but that its local talk programming would cease as it shifted to a full-time Fox Sports Radio feed with "some play by play" while Zobrist sought a buyer. In October, Zobrist updated the situation and noted that no progress had been made in the sale.

=== Shift to talk; closure ===
In April 2025, Zobrist announced the sale of a majority stake in the station to Big Toe Media, a consortium that included David Greene and Conrad Thompson. Big Toe's plans included broadening the station's focus to a general interest (and partially brokered) talk radio station discussing "anything except for politics" and changing the station's call sign. Greene stated that he had initially been hired to shop the KFNS intellectual properties to other buyers and, after the most promising prospect dropped out of contention, agreed to buy the station from Zobrist themselves at a greatly discounted rate from its previous sale price.

On April 25, 2025, the Federal Communications Commission (FCC) approved the station's sale. On June 1, 2025, the call letters were changed to KLIS and the station flipped to its new wide ranging talk format as "The Lou Information Station".

On March 3, 2026, KLIS went off the air and surrendered its license to the FCC. The license was cancelled the next day.
