= KMJM =

KMJM may refer to:

- KMJM (AM), a radio station (1360 AM) licensed to Cedar Rapids, Iowa, United States
- KTLK-FM, a radio station (104.9 FM) licensed to Columbia, Illinois, United States, which held the call sign KMJM-FM from 1997 to 2012 and from 2020 to 2021
- KATZ-FM, a radio station (100.3 FM) licensed to serve Bridgeton, Missouri, United States, which held the call sign KMJM-FM from 2012 to 2017
- KSLZ, a radio station (107.7 FM) licensed to St. Louis, Missouri, which held the call sign KMJM-FM from 1979 to 1997
