= KSIV =

KSIV may refer to:

- KSIV (AM), a radio station (1320 AM) licensed to Clayton, Missouri, United States
- KSIV-FM, a radio station (91.5 FM) licensed to St. Louis, Missouri, United States
- The ICAO airport code for Sullivan County International Airport in Sullivan, Indiana, United States
