= Miles Davis Quintet at Peacock Alley =

Miles Davis at Peacock Alley

Live album by Miles Davis
- Released: 1997
- Recorded: February 16 & 23, 1957
- Genre: Jazz
- Label: Soulard Intertainment Co.

Miles Davis chronology
Amsterdam Concert (2005)	Miles Davis at Peacock Alley (1997)	Live at the 1963 Monterey Jazz Festival (2007)

Miles Davis Quintet at Peacock Alley is an unauthorized bootleg album by jazz musician Miles Davis. It was released by Soulard Intertainment Co. in 1997. The album consists of a two-part broadcast from the Peacock Alley jazz in St. Louis, Missouri.

Davis performed at the Peacock in July 1956 and February 1957. The sessions were hosted by Spider Burks, St. Louis' leading disc jockey and jazz disciple," during an engagement Davis had at the Peacock Alley on February 15–23, 1957.

The broadcasts for this album have sometimes been dated as July 14 and July 21, 1956 for KXLW-AM, but Burks had been fired from KXLW-AM on July 11, 1956. He was later hired by KSTL-AM and he broadcast his radio show from the Peacock Alley every Saturday.

== Track listing ==
Original CD release Miles Davis at Peacock Alley

Disc 1 (recorded July 14, 1956):

1. "Intro" - (0:41)
2. "Ah-Leu-Cha" (Charlie Parker) - 5:53
3. "A Foggy Day" (George Gershwin, Ira Gershwin) - 5:19
4. "All of You" (Cole Porter) - 6:35
5. "Woody ‘n’ You" (Dizzy Gillespie) - 5:13
6. "Walkin’" - 7:27

Disc 2 (recorded July 21, 1956):

1. "Two Bass Hit" (Dizzy Gillespie, John Lewis) - 5:16
2. "Well You Needn't" (Thelonious Monk) - 7:39
3. "Billy Boy" (Traditional) - 4:23
4. "All of You" (Cole Porter) - 11:03
5. "Airegin" (Sonny Rollins) - 6:07
6. "Newk #2/Theme" (Miles Davis) - 7:01
7. "The Theme" (Miles Davis) - 1:17

== Personnel ==
- Miles Davis — trumpet
- John Coltrane — tenor saxophone
- Red Garland — piano
- Paul Chambers — bass
- Philly Joe Jones — drums
