= 100.3 The Beat =

100.3 The Beat may refer to:

- KATZ-FM, a radio station (100.3 FM) licensed to Bridgeton, Missouri, US
- KKLQ (FM) in Los Angeles, California, under the call sign KKBT
- WPHI-FM in Pennsauken, New Jersey
