= Spider Burks =

Jesse Dillon "Spider" Burks (September 17, 1922 – September 4, 1975) was an American disc jockey who championed jazz music. He was one of the first African-American disc jockeys in St. Louis, Missouri. Burks was well known for his jazz programs on several radio stations, including KXLW-AM, KSTL-AM, KATZ-AM, and KADI-FM.

== Life and career ==
Jesse Dillon Burks was born in St. Louis, Missouri on September 17, 1922. He attended elementary school and high school in Hampton, Virginia. He began working on the radio while attending the Hampton Institute. He graduated with a major in electrical engineering in 1946.

In March 1947, Burks was hired by St. Louis radio station KXLW. Burks received the nickname "Spider" from singer Nat King Cole because he reminded him of a spider due to his tall and lean stature. He hosted a daily show called "The 'Spider' Burks House of Joy" where played jazz music. During his tenure at KXLW, Burks was one of the highest-paid African-American disc jockeys in the United States. At the height of his popularity, he was making $50,000 a year.

Burks was fired from KXLW without notice after he came off their air on Wednesday, July 11, 1956. Burks told the St. Louis Argus that he was "summoned into the manager's office, handed a check covering his services up through Wednesday, including a two weeks accrued vacation and told 'This is it.'" He felt KXLW general manager and vice-president William W. Jefferay had been out to get him for some time.

Burks hosted a radio show at the Peacock Alley that was broadcast on KSTL every Saturday. Before opening the Peacock Alley, Al Fein, the operator of the nightclub, said he conferred with Burkes first. Burks recorded jazz musician Miles Davis and his band during an engagement in February 1957, which was later released on the album Spider Burks and the Miles Davis Quintet at Peacock Alley (1997).

By the late 1960s, Burke had his own production company making TV and radio spots and a public relations company. From 1970 to 1971, he hosted the "Spider" Burks Show broadcast on KXLW live from the Gourmet Rendezvous.

After Burks left radio in the early 1970s, he became an insurance salesman. In 1972, he began working as a job placement officer at the St. Louis County Division of Adult Correctional Institution.

Burks died at the age of 52 from cancer on September 4, 1975. His body was donated to the St. Louis University School of Medicine for cancer research. Burks was survived by his wife of 28 years, Leah Burk, and son Reginald Burk.
