= WSGX =

WSGX may refer to:

- WSGX-LP, a low-power radio station (95.1 FM) licensed to serve East Baton Rouge, Louisiana, United States
- KATZ-FM, a radio station (100.3 FM) licensed to serve Bridgeton, Missouri, United States, which held the call sign WSGX from 2011 to 2012
