= Oldies 103.3 =

Oldies 103.3 can refer to:

- KLOU, a radio station in St. Louis, Missouri formerly branded as "Oldies 103.3"
- WBGB (FM), a radio station in Boston, Massachusetts formerly known as "Oldies 103.3"
