= Peacock Alley (jazz club) =

Coordinates: 38°38′00″N 90°13′18″W

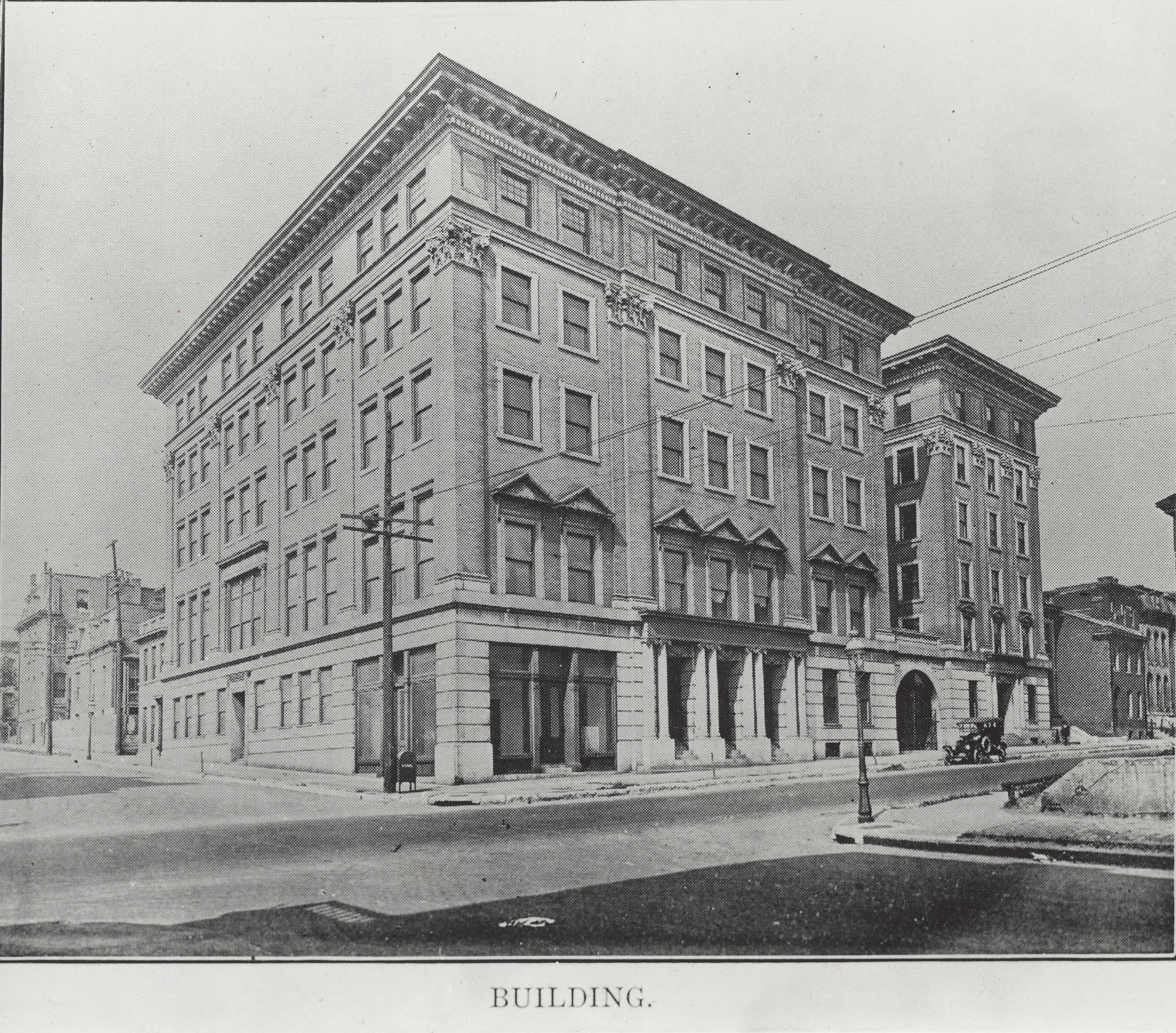
City Hospital #2 at 2945 Lawton Boulevard in 1920. The building was adjoined to Centenary Hospital, built in 1902; this building became the Midland Hotel that housed Peacock Alley.

The Peacock Alley was a jazz club at 2935 Lawton Boulevard St. Louis, Missouri. It was one of St. Louis' most important nightclubs in the 1950s. Due to its close proximity to Union Station, it was favored among musicians.

== History ==
The venue was located in the Mill Creek Valley neighborhood of St. Louis at 2935 Lawton Boulevard (the street no longer exists). Some sources report that it was located in Gaslight Square, although this is incorrect. It initially opened in the basement of the Hotel Midtown as the Glass Bar and Gold Room on November 3, 1944.

In 1956, the Glass Bar was remodeled and renamed the Peacock Alley. Peacock Alley was located inside the new Midland Hotel. It was named after the Peacock Alley cocktail bar inside New York's Waldorf-Astoria. The Billy Williams Quartet performed at the opening of the Peacock Alley on April 20, 1956.

The Peacock Alley was operated by Al Fein. DJ Spider Burks hosted a radio show at the venue for the jazz radio station KSTL. Burks recorded trumpeter Miles Davis and his band during an engagement in February 1957, which was later released on the album Spider Burks and the Miles Davis Quintet at Peacock Alley (1997).

The saxophonist Bob Graf recorded some tracks from his album The Bob Graf Sessions (1959) at Peacock Alley in 1958.

The Peacock Alley continued to attract renowned jazz musicians well into 1959. By the fall of 1959, the venue was open for private parties only before it was closed. The building was demolished as the Mill Creek Valley neighborhood was razed for an urban renewal project.

== Notable performers ==
Notable musicians who performed at the Peacock Alley include:

- Miles Davis
- John Coltrane
- Arthur Prysock
- Ike Turner
- The Chet Baker Quartet
- J.J. Johnson
- Max Roach
- Carmen McRae
- Chico Hamilton
- Art Blakey
- Eddie Davis Trio
- Shirley Scott
- Cozy Cole
