= Vivian Gibson (author) =

American writer

- Education: Fashion Institute of Technology (AFA); Fontbonne University (BS); Washington University in St. Louis (MA)
- Occupation: Writer
- Writing career
- Notable work: The Last Children of Mill Creek

Vivian Gibson is an American writer. Her memoir, The Last Children of Mill Creek, recounts her childhood in the African American community of Mill Creek Valley in St. Louis.

== Biography ==
Gibson grew up in Mill Creek as the second youngest in a family with eight children. They lived in the ground floor of a two-story home purchased by her grandmother in 1950. Her grandmother worked as a "live-in servant," returning home every other weekend for church. Her mother, Frances Ross, was an artist, and her father, Randle Ross, worked several jobs.

Gibson worked as a recruiter for McKinsey & Company in New York City while obtaining an Associate of Fine Arts in Apparel design from Fashion Institute of Technology. She married, and in 1978 moved with her husband to Liberia, where she began a clothing import business. After the 1980 Liberian coup d'état, she moved back in St. Louis. She worked for St. Louis Public Schools for 20 years, and completed a BS in Business administration from Fontbonne University, and later a MA in Nonprofit management from Washington University in St. Louis. In 2015, Gibson retired from her position as senior director of volunteer recruitment at Big Brothers Big Sisters of Eastern Missouri.

== Writing ==
Following retirement, Gibson enrolled in a creative writing workshop for older adults. An essay from the workshop, "From Sunup to Sundown," was later published in The St. Louis Anthology (Arcadia Publishing, 2019). She was a contributing playwright of the 2017 50in50: Writing Women into Existence at Billie Holiday Theatre. Her writing has also been published by Belt Publishing and Plough Quarterly Magazine.

=== The Last Children of Mill Creek ===
Gibson was motivated to write her memoir after the success of her essay in The St. Louis Anthology and seeing a lack of Black perspectives on Mill Creek Valley and portrayals of the tight-knit community. Drawing from her memories, the stories of Mill Creek portray idyllic images of Black childhood centering family life, church, crafting, and games, with little knowledge or interaction with the world outside her community. When her family moves to another neighborhood in 1958, she sees dramatic changes as the remaining white families on the block avoid them and eventually move.

When the book was published by Belt Publishing in 2020, the book launch at Missouri History Museum was canceled due to COVID-19 lockdown. Gibson had already received reviews and learned how to promote the book on social media and virtual book talks. By 2025, the book entered its 5th printing and has generated discussion and memorialization of Mill Creek Valley. The neighborhood's history is featured at the Harris–Stowe State University Center of Innovation and Entrepreneurship, temporary murals at Saint Louis University marked the historic entrance to the neighborhood, and the new Target store at the center of the neighborhood's footprint commissioned a mural by Cbabi Bayoc in the spirit of Gibson's book. Artist Damon Davis consulted with Gibson for his “Pillars of the Valley” monument at the Energizer Park soccer stadium built on the land of historic Mill Creek Valley.

Gibson collaborated with filmmaker Khalid Abdulqaadir, whose father grew up in the neighborhood, on a 20-minute documentary Remembering Mill Creek: When We Were There.

== Awards and recognition ==
- Poets & Writers: 5 over 50, 2020
- First Things Magazine: Book of the Year, 2020
- Missouri Humanities Council: Literary Achievement Award, 2020
- Missouri Library Association: Missouri Author of the Year, 2022
