= Mill Creek Valley =

Neighborhood of St. Louis in Missouri, US

Mill Creek Valley (former neighborhood)
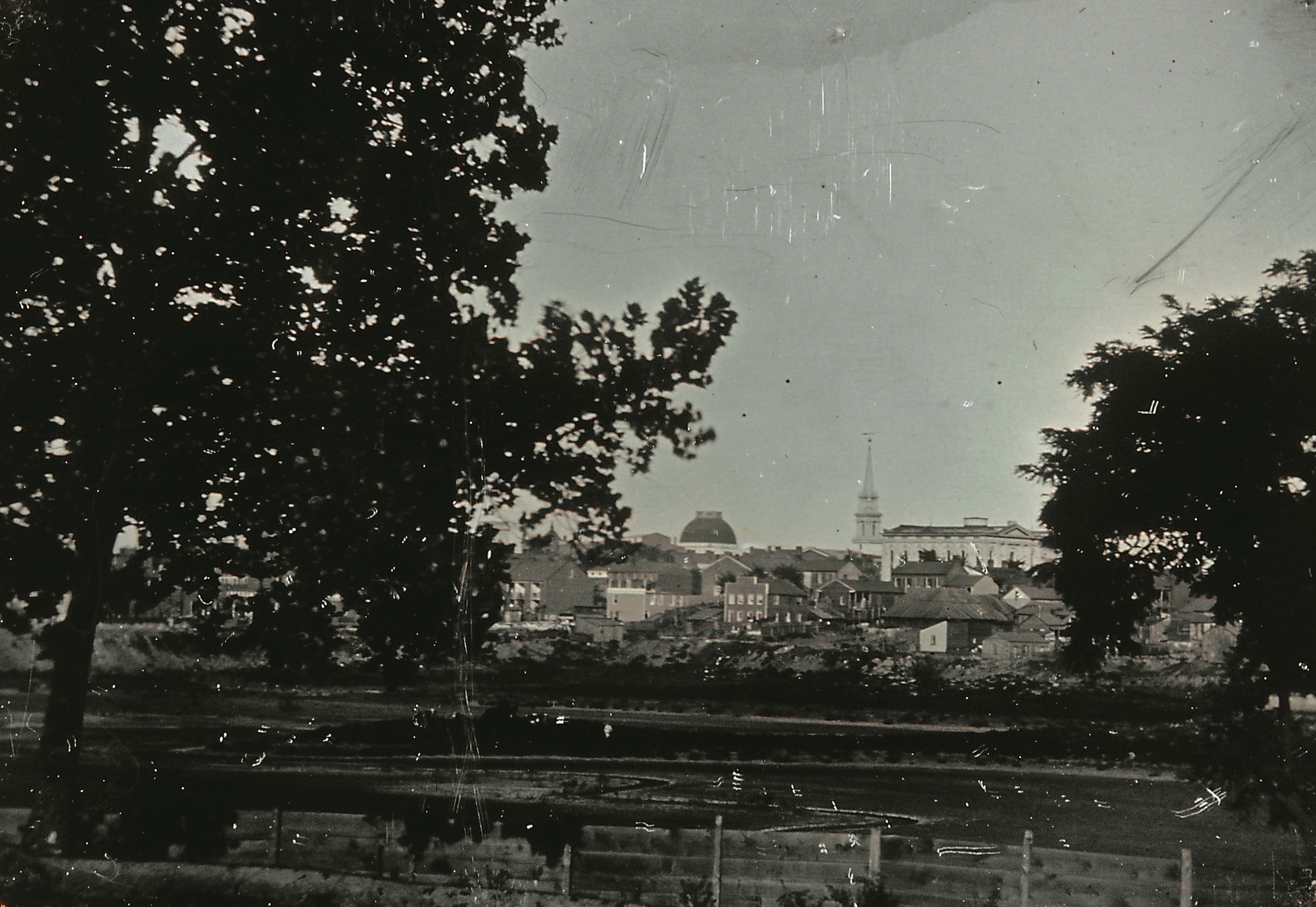
- Thomas Martin Easterly, St. Louis from across the Mill Creek Valley, 1853, Missouri History Museum
- Etymology: Mill Creek, originally known as La Petite Rivière
- Location within St. Louis
- Coordinates: 38°37′58″N 90°13′19″W
- Settled: 1760s
- Razed: 1959

Area
  - Total: 188 ha (465 acres)

Population
  - Estimate (1959): 20,000
- External maps: Mill Creek Valley maps

Mill Creek Valley was a historic neighborhood located in the central corridor between 20th Street and Saint Louis University in St. Louis, Missouri. European settlement began in the 18th century with mills established along La Petite Rivière, now known as Mill Creek. It became an industrial and railroad center in the 19th century. Union Station was opened in 1894. The building was closed in 1978 and renovated for commercial use. Also a residential and commercial center, Mill Creek Valley was populated by German immigrants and African Americans, before and after the Civil War. More people moved into the area during World War II to support the war effort.

An urban renewal project of the late 1950s razed most of the residential dwellings, commercial buildings and churches. Although the intention was to establish a prospering commercial and residential area, Saint Louis University and Harris–Stowe State University (HSSU) command much of the former Mill Creek Valley land.

Notable residents include Lucy A. Delaney (c. 1828–1830 – 1910), who wrote about winning her suit for freedom and became a community leader. Also, General William Tecumseh Sherman (1820–1891) who served the Union Army during the American Civil War, and Josephine Baker (1906–1975), an American-born French entertainer, French Resistance agent, and civil rights activist. Another was Erskine Oglesby (1937–2004), an American tenor saxophonist and blues singer.

== History ==
=== Millpond period ===
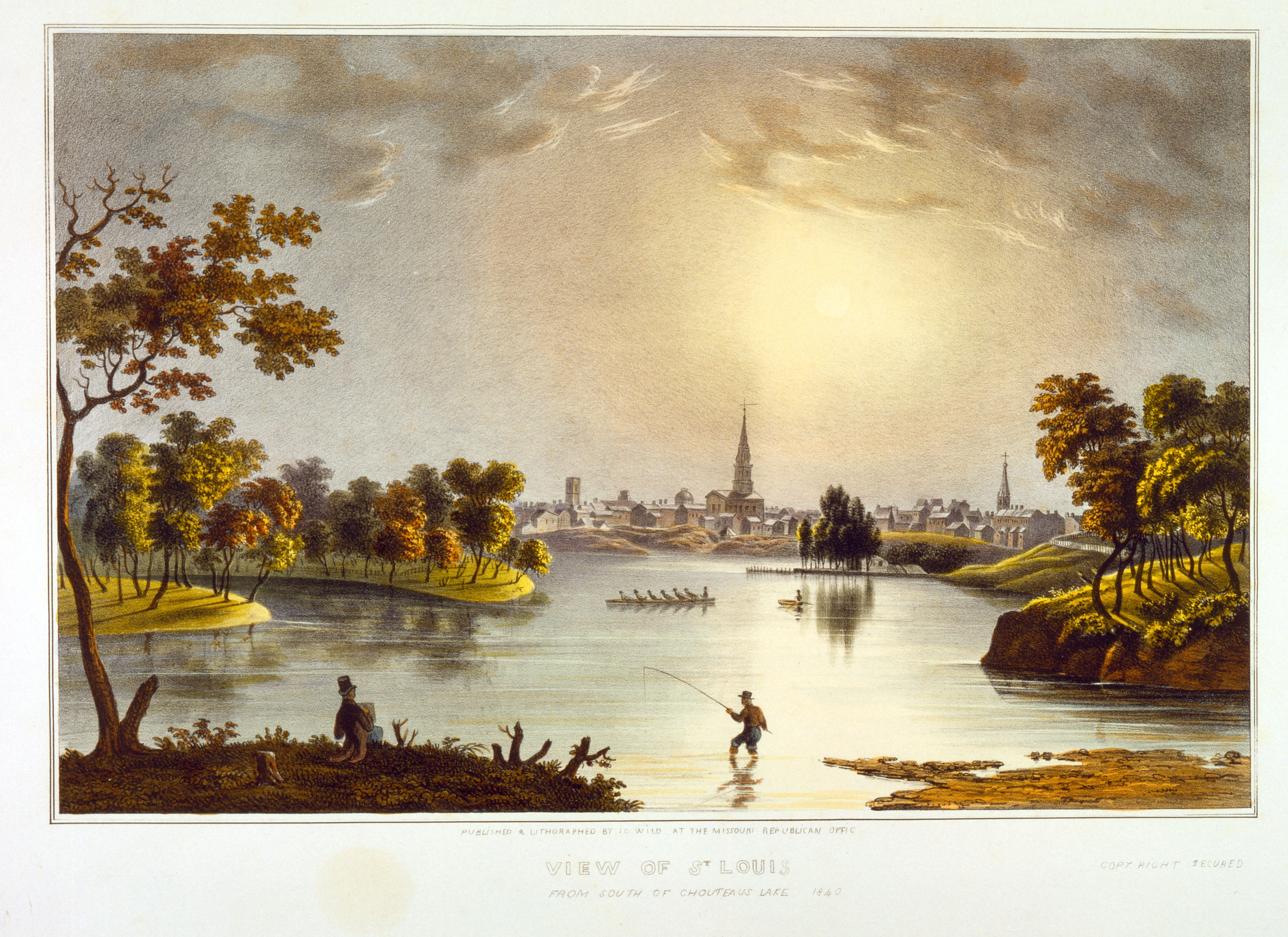
View of St. Louis from Chouteau's Lake, 1840, lithograph by J. C. Wild

Among the initial settlers of St. Louis were Joseph and Roger Taillons, who were millers. Joseph settled along La Petite Rivière and built a grist mill and a dam along present-day Eighth Street. (Note: Pierre Laclède was granted land along La Petite Rivière to establish a grist mill on August 11, 1766.) The creek, later named Mill Creek, ran along what is now Vandeventer Avenue to the Mississippi River. Taillon's mill was not large enough to make sufficient flour for the community. Pierre Laclède paid Taillon four hundred livres in cash for the mill and he built a larger mill and raised the dam. Laclède was granted 1,000 acres along the creek on August 11, 1766.

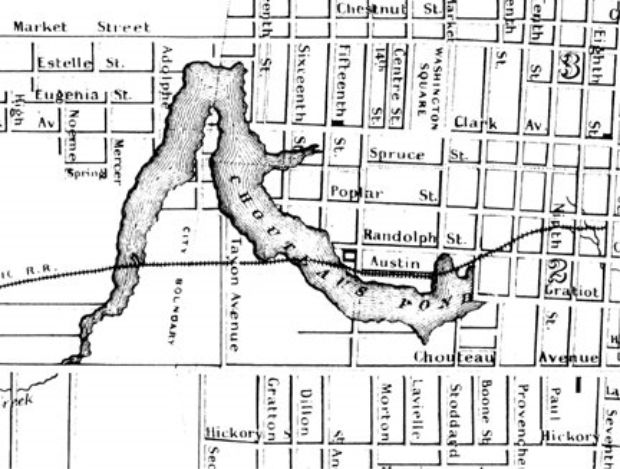
Chouteau's Pond, St. Louis, 1856

In 1770, Laclède entered into a contract with the Spanish government to supply bread to visiting Native Americans. After his death, the property was sold to Auguste Chouteau. Chouteau's grist mill was located along the creek south of present-day Clark Street. Chouteau's Pond was a local attraction. (Note: Chouteau's Pond extended on both sides of current U.S. 40 and its western edge was oer the location of Union Station. It was north of Chouteau Avenue and in some places north of Clark Avenue.) Other water-powered and horse-powered mills were established in the area; they were the first industrial plants in St. Louis.

=== Growth due to westward expansion ===
By 1849, the Missouri Republican newspaper estimated that one-third of the city's population were emigrants. During the California Gold Rush, up to 800 emigrants arrived in St. Louis, bound for the western territory. People that stayed in St. Louis found that housing was limited and many stayed in slums. Without garbage collection and sewers, the city became increasingly polluted and unhealthy. A cholera epidemic spread throughout the city in the spring of 1849, essentially suspending business, church, school, and judicial activities. Two-thirds of the people who lived near Chouteau's pond, the filthiest area in the city, died of the disease by July 3. There was talk of draining the pond and installing a sewer system, which was weighed against voters' predilection for low taxes and apathy for the conditions of the poorest people in the city. After a mass protest, a 12-person Committee of Public Health was established, led by Edward Bates (later United States Attorney General under President Abraham Lincoln). The powerful committee enforced sanitation ordinances, by removing waste, providing clean water, providing health care for the ill, ensuring residents disinfected their homes, and removing the dead for burial. Chouteau's Pond was drained due to cholera epidemics and pollution in 1852.

=== Railroads ===
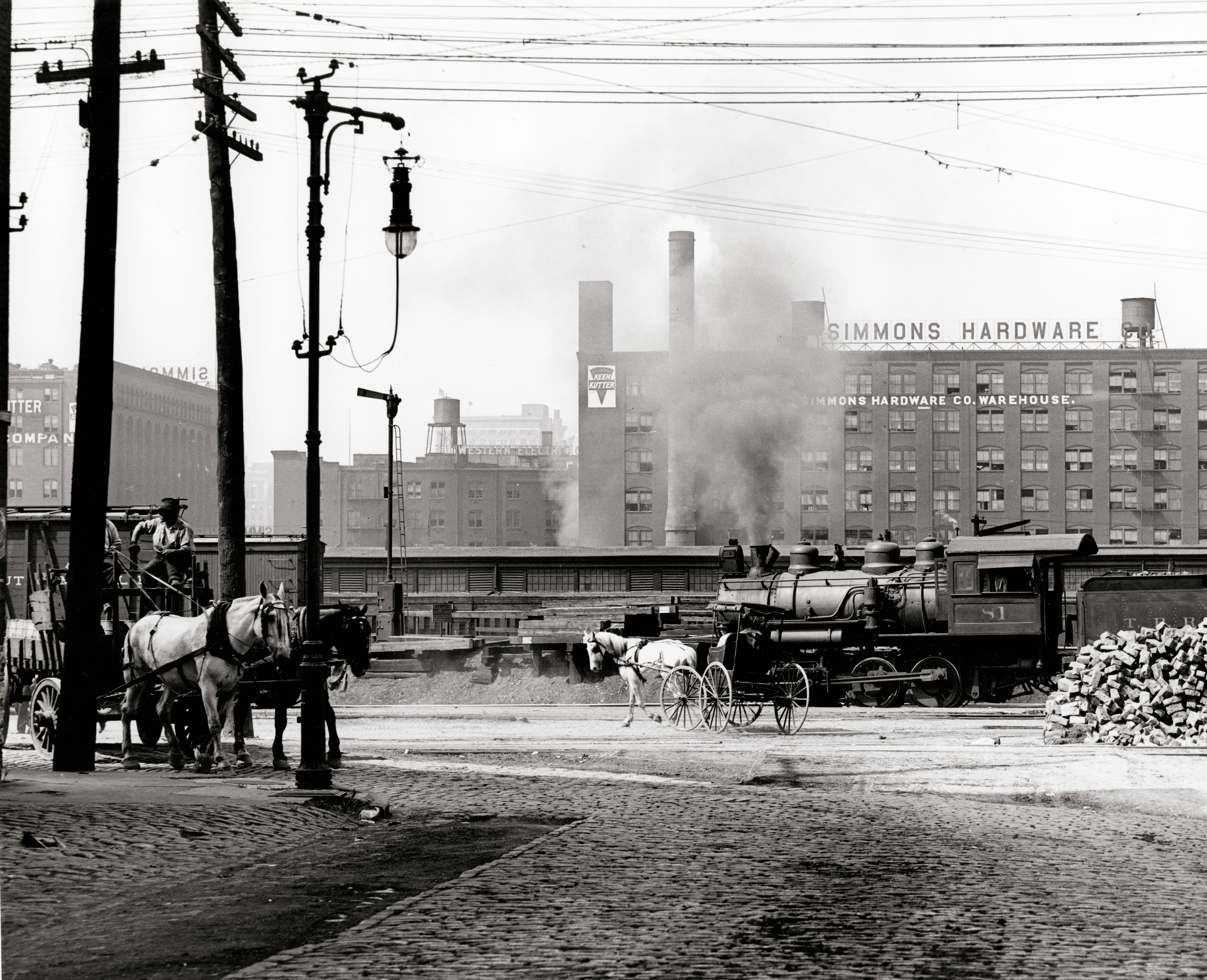
View of the intersection of Eighth and Poplar Streets looking across Mill Creek rail yards to Cupples Station warehouse and Simmons Hardware warehouse

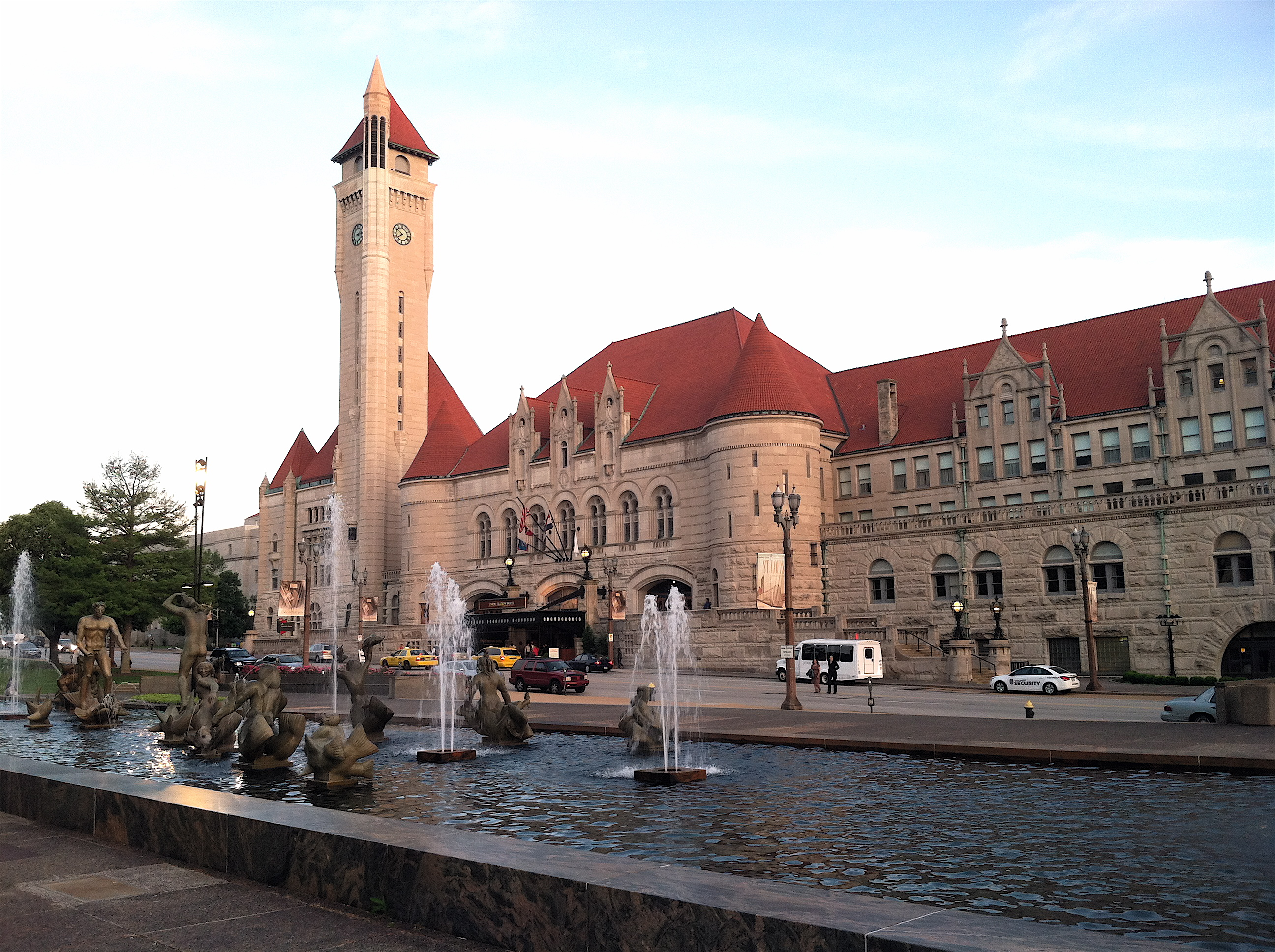
St. Louis Union Station

About that time, railroads lines were established from St. Louis to the western frontier. Mill Creek Valley became a combination of residential and industrial section of the city, with factories and railroad yards, reflecting the city's continued growth as a transportation hub and an industrial center. Depots, roundhouses, bridges over railroad tracks, and many warehouses were built in Mill Creek Valley to support the railroad industry in St. Louis.

In 1892, construction began for a 42 acre (17 ha) railroad site and a new railroad terminal designed and supervised by Theodore C. Link. Remnants of the millpond period—log cabins, hulls of boats, and willow stumps were removed—and deep caves and vaults from an old brewery were extracted. Union Station was opened in 1894. It had 32 railroad lines for multiple railroad company and the largest train shed in the world at the time. The station operated until 1978, when it was renovated for commercial space.

=== Residential and commercial growth ===
The area was populated by German immigrants who moved into the valley during the 19th century. African Americans settled in the area, some of whom were free and others had escaped enslavement. After the Civil War (1861–1865), poor blacks moved north from southern cotton fields to Mill Creek Valley.

=== World War I and II ===
During World War I (1914–1918) and World War II (1939–1945), there was a surge in the number of people that came to the city to work for the war effort. During World War I, there was a 41% increase in African American residents. By World War II, there were nearly 20,000 residents, most of whom were Black.

=== African American community ===
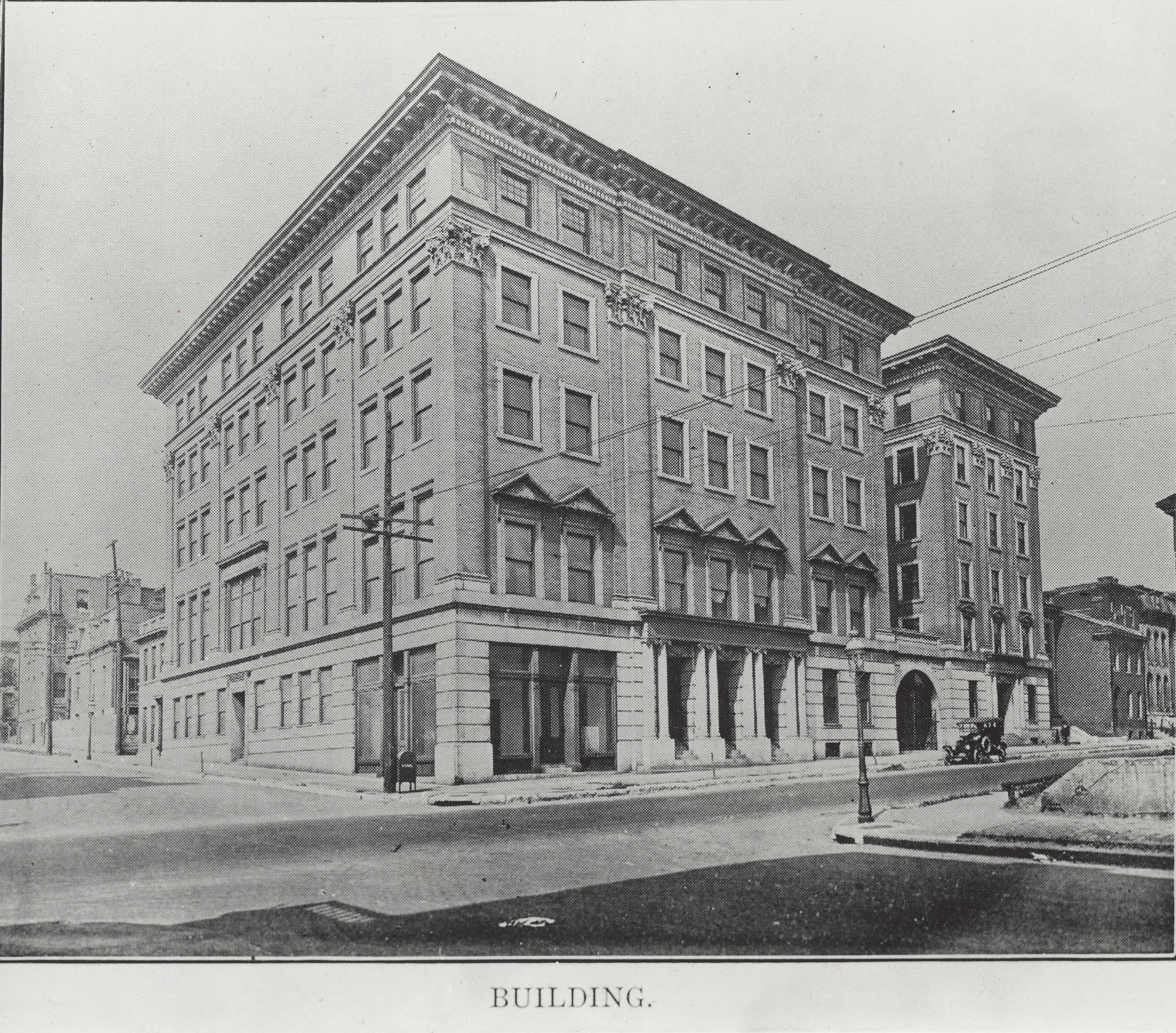
City Hospital #2 at 2945 Lawton Boulevard in 1920. The building was adjoined to Centenary Hospital, built in 1902; eventually, this building would be the Midtown Hotel which housed Peacock Alley.

Mill Creek Valley became one of the largest African American communities in the first half of the 20th century. Black businesses and organizations thrived. Mill Creek Valley, spanning 465 acres, was the home to hundreds of businesses and organizations, 5,600 residential buildings, and 43 historic churches in the 1950s. One of the Black businesses was the People's Finance Corporation Building. Notable educational facilities were the Booker T. Washington Vocational School, and the original Vashon High School. City Hospital #2 was established in the valley.

The YWCA, Phillis Wheatley Branch was a center of intellectual life in the Mill Creek Valley neighborhood. The Fisk Jubilee Singers performed at Wheatley in 1916, and W.E.B. Du Bois gave a lecture in 1922. Maya Angelou, Mary McLeod Bethune and Butterfly McQueen all visited or stayed in the YWCA's hotel rooms.

Bars and nightclubs were established. Residents Josephine Baker and Scott Joplin attained worldwide fame. The community developed a distinctive culture based upon African American music, religion and activism. It became a center for racial justice activism.

Redlining and segregation caused the neighborhood to overcrowd and degrade. It had a lack of water and electricity. Buildings deteriorated and the area was unsanitary. Of the dwellings, 80 percent did not have bathrooms within the house and 50 percent of the houses did not have running water. Despite the difficulties and widespread negative perceptions of the neighborhood, it was one of the key African American neighborhoods.

== Urban renewal project ==
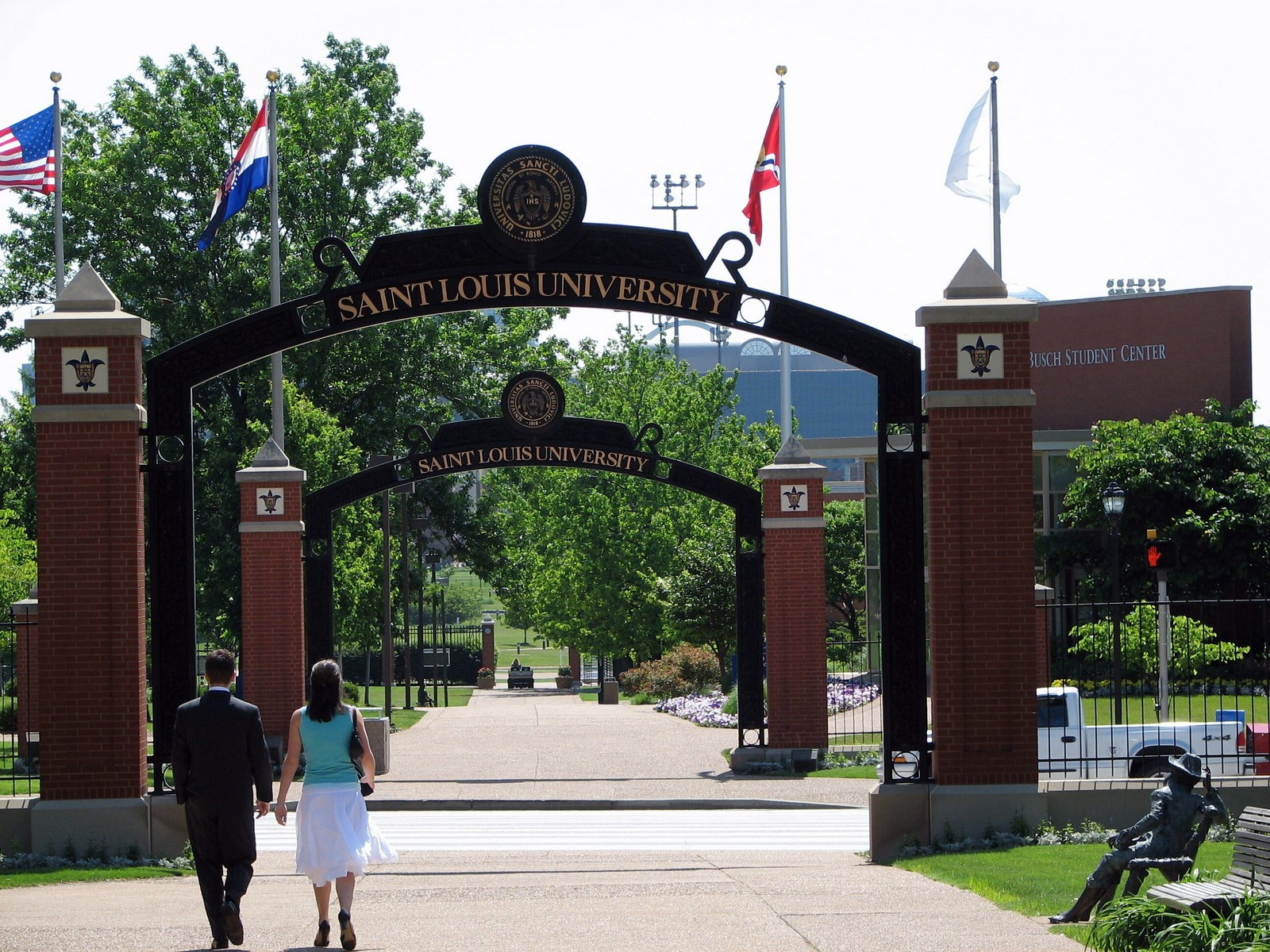
Saint Louis University portals at Grand Boulevard

The Housing Act of 1954 was enacted to fund urban renewal projects across the country. Mayor Raymond R. Tucker announced his plans on August 7, 1954 to demolish the buildings to allow for new development. According to a contemporary report, 99% of the structures in the area were in need of major repairs, 80% were without bathrooms and toilets, and 67% had no running water. In 1955, voters of the City of St. Louis passed a $110 million bond issue, of which $10 million was delegated for the demolition of Mill Creek Valley. The urban renewal project also constructed residential buildings, created industrial zones, and built new highways, including U.S. Highway 40. It was the nation's largest urban-renewal project at the time.

About 20,000 African American residents were displaced before it was leveled for an urban renewal project that began in 1959. The emptied land did not attract the investments anticipated by Raymond Tucker, being primarily divided between Saint Louis University (SLU) and Harris–Stowe State University (HSSU). A few buildings were spared destruction: HSSU incorporated the old Vashon High School into its campus, and SLU converted the Berea Presbyterian Church into an event space. The Grand Tower of Council Plaza, Grand Forest, and Laclede Park apartments provided residential housing.

=== Repercussions ===
As was true with a number of urban renewal projects in the United States, "federal funds were used to systematically discriminate against African Americans and hinder their progress." More than 40 churches, hundreds of businesses and organizations, and thousands of residential buildings, many of them with historical significance, were destroyed. It was one of the key African American neighborhoods and its residents were displaced from their community and social networks. Joseph Heathcott called the destruction "a terrible, terrible tragedy," saying that the city could have invested in the neighborhood.

HSSU unveiled a mural for the campus in February 2018 that was Wells Fargo-commissioned in honor of Mill Creek Valley. A soccer stadium, Energizer Park, was built in the Mill Valley footprint and features a Damon Davis installation commemorating the displaced residents. In 2020, childhood resident Vivian Gibson published her memoir Last Children of Mill Creek. Following the success of the book, public memorials and monuments have been initiated at sites located within the footprint of the depopulated neighborhood.

In 2025, Missouri History Museum opened an exhibit commemorating Mill Creek Valley, led by curator of urban landscape and community identity, Gwen Moore, who grew up in the neighborhood.

== Notable residents ==
- Josephine Baker (1906–1975), an American-born French entertainer, French Resistance agent, and civil rights activist.
- Lucy A. Delaney (c. 1828–1830 – 1910), was an African-American woman that during her years of freedom was a seamstress, slave narrator, and community leader.
- Erskine Oglesby (1937–2004), an American tenor saxophonist and blues singer.
- General William Tecumseh Sherman (1820–1891), served the Union Army during the American Civil War
- Madam C. J. Walker (1867–1919), an African American entrepreneur, philanthropist, and political and social activist who is regarded as the first female self-made millionaire in America.
- Walt Whitman (1819–1892), was an American poet, essayist and journalist who visited his brother, owner of the Daily Missouri Republican
- Roy Wilkins (1901–1981), an American civil rights leader who was executive director of the NAACP for more than 20 years.

== See also ==
- 1896 St. Louis–East St. Louis tornado
- Eads Bridge
- Graham Paper Company
- Pacific Railroad
- Peacock Alley (jazz club)
- St. Mary of Victories Church
- Destruction of Veiled Prophet Den in Mill Creek Valley
