= KSD (FM) =

Country music radio station in St. Louis

- St. Louis, Missouri; United States
- Broadcast area: Greater St. Louis
- Frequency: 93.7 MHz (HD Radio)
- Branding: 93.7 The Bull

Programming
- Format: Country
- Subchannels: HD2: TikTok Radio
- Affiliations: Premiere Networks

Ownership
- Owner: iHeartMedia, Inc.; (iHM Licenses, LLC)
- Sister stations: KATZ; KATZ-FM; KLOU; KSLZ; KTLK-FM; W279AQ

History
- First air date: March 27, 1955 (as KCFM)
- Former call signs: KCFM (1955–1980); KSD-FM (1980–1997)
- Call sign meaning: St. Louis Post-Dispatch (original owner of KSD (AM), now KTRS)

Technical information
- Licensing authority: FCC
- Facility ID: 20360
- Class: C1
- ERP: 74,000 watts
- HAAT: 309 meters (1,014 ft)
- Transmitter coordinates: 38°36′47″N 90°20′08″W

Links
- Public license information: Public file; LMS
- Webcast: Listen live (via iHeartRadio); HD2: Listen live (via iHeartRadio)
- Website: 937thebull.iheart.com

KSD (93.7 MHz, "93.7 The Bull") is a country music radio station in St. Louis, Missouri. It is owned by iHeartMedia, Inc., with studios on Highlands Plaza Drive in St. Louis, south of Forest Park. KSD carries two nationally syndicated iHeartRadio programs on weekdays, The Bobby Bones Show in morning drive time and After MidNite with Granger Smith overnight.

KSD has an effective radiated power (ERP) of 74,000 watts. The transmitter is in Resurrection Cemetery in Shrewsbury, amid the towers for other FM and TV stations. KSD broadcasts using HD Radio technology, and carries iHeartRadio's "TikTok Radio" music service on its HD2 digital subchannel.

KSD is unusual as an FM station with only three letters in its call sign. The station inherited its call letters from its former AM sister station, KSD (now KTRS), which originated in the earliest days of broadcasting.

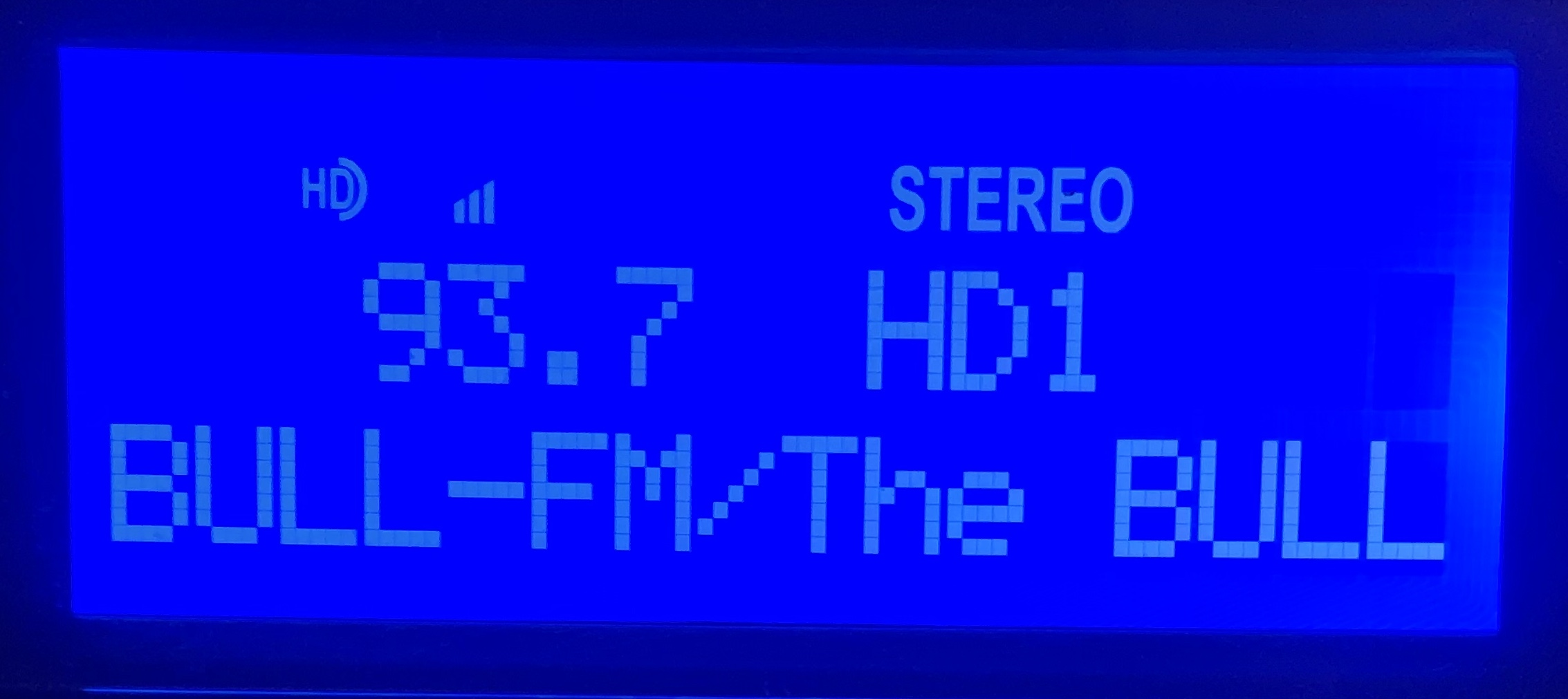
KSD broadcasting in HD

== History ==
=== KCFM ===
On March 27, 1955, the station signed on the air under the KCFM call letters. KCFM was owned by the Commercial Broadcasting Company, and broadcast from the Boatmen's Bank Building.

Its studios and transmitter moved to 532 DeBaliviere Avenue in 1959. For much of the 1960s and 1970s, KCFM broadcast a beautiful music format, playing quarter-hour sweeps of soft instrumental cover versions of popular songs with occasional middle of the road vocals.

=== KSD-FM ===
Combined Communications, the owners of KSD (550 AM), bought KCFM in 1978. After the completion of the sale, Combined relaunched KCFM as an adult contemporary music station. To trade on the AM station's well-known call letters, on July 10, 1980, KCFM became KSD-FM. KSD-FM evolved into a hybrid of adult contemporary music and adult top 40 hits (also known as hot AC) under the "KS94 FM" moniker.

In August 1987, KSD-FM flipped to classic rock as "The New 93.7 KSD-FM". That format lasted until January 1999, when KSD-FM briefly went back to hot AC as "Mix 93.7".

=== Country music ===
At noon on October 9, 2000, KSD-FM switched to country music as "93.7 The Bull", soon after WKKX (106.5 FM) dropped country to become smooth jazz-formatted WSSM. Due to a big ownership shakeup in 2000, Bonneville International ended up owning both competing St. Louis country stations. With 106.5 playing smooth jazz, that opened up a spot for a competitor to longtime country station WIL-FM, also owned by Bonneville.

The first song on "The Bull" was "The Thunder Rolls" by Garth Brooks. Since then, KSD-FM and WIL-FM have competed for St. Louis country music listeners, with each station trading the lead in the Nielsen ratings.

== See also ==
- List of three-letter broadcast call signs in the United States
