= KLOU =

Classic hits radio station in St. Louis

- St. Louis, Missouri; United States
- Broadcast area: Greater St. Louis
- Frequency: 103.3 MHz (HD Radio)
- Branding: 103.3 KLOU

Programming
- Format: Classic hits
- Subchannels: HD2: Smooth jazz

Ownership
- Owner: iHeartMedia; (iHM Licenses, LLC)
- Sister stations: KATZ; KATZ-FM; KSD; KSLZ; KTLK-FM; W279AQ

History
- First air date: February 12, 1962
- Former call signs: KMOX-FM (1962–1982); KHTR (1982–1988)
- Call sign meaning: St. Louis

Technical information
- Licensing authority: FCC
- Facility ID: 9626
- Class: C1
- ERP: 90,000 watts
- HAAT: 313 meters (1,027 ft)
- Transmitter coordinates: 38°34′27.9″N 90°19′31.8″W

Links
- Public license information: Public file; LMS
- Webcast: Listen live (via iHeartRadio)
- Website: klou.iheart.com

KLOU (103.3 FM) is a commercial radio station in St. Louis, Missouri, owned by iHeartMedia, Inc. It airs a classic hits radio format, specializing in 1980s and 1990s songs, with some 1970s hits mixed in. The station's studios are on Foundry Way, off Interstate 64.

KLOU is a Class C1 station with an effective radiated power (ERP) of 90,000 watts. Its transmitter is among other FM and TV towers in Resurrection Cemetery in Shrewsbury. KLOU broadcasts using HD Radio technology.

== History ==
=== KMOX-FM ===
The station signed on the air on February 12, 1962. The original call sign was KMOX-FM, sister station to AM powerhouse KMOX (1120 AM), owned by CBS. In the early 1960s, the two stations mostly simulcast their programming.

By the late 1960s, KMOX-FM had a separate format, playing easy listening music and was partially automated in its early years. The focus then shifted to an adult contemporary and soft rock style of music by the 1970s, which was also used at other FM stations owned by CBS Radio.

=== Hitradio 103 KHTR ===
In the summer of 1981, KMOX-FM began gradually evolving its format toward Top 40/CHR by adding more current hits to its playlist. By August 1982, the transition was complete, and the station's call letters were changed to KHTR on December 20, 1982. They stood for "Hit Radio". The first (and ultimately, last) song under the Top 40 format was "I Love Rock and Roll" by Joan Jett and the Blackhearts.

"Hitradio 103", like co-owned WHTT in Boston and KKHR in Los Angeles, was modeled after programmer Mike Joseph's successful Hot Hits format, although unlike early Hot Hits stations, KHTR also played recurrent hits and library titles from the past decade. KHTR was an almost immediate success, quickly becoming the No. 2 station in the market among all listeners 12 and over, only trailing KMOX itself. Unlike most of CBS's markets where the Hitradio format was tried, the ratings began to decline as the station's local programmers refused to diversify away from a 'tried-and-true' playlist, which led to listeners exhausted by the station's repetition to create a derisive acronym for KHTR's call letters as "Keep Hearing Those Repeats".

=== Oldies KLOU ===
After the ratings declined to an unsustainable level, CBS shifted the station to an oldies format on November 5, 1988, at midnight, which it had done with several of its stations in the late 1980s, including the aforementioned stations in Boston and Los Angeles. The new call letters of KLOU debuted on the same day, and the station took on the then-common format of hits ranging from the 1950s, 1960s, and up to 1975. The move was signaled on-air by the playing of two different versions of "Don't Be Cruel", beginning with Cheap Trick's cover and switching midway through to the original Elvis Presley version to mark the change.

The first song played on "Oldies 103" was "Rock and Roll Is Here to Stay" by Danny and the Juniors. As digital tuners became more popular on FM radios, KLOU changed its branding to "Oldies 103.3". Over time, songs from the 1950s were reduced then fully phased out, with post-1975 and 1980s music soon replacing it, and eventually "oldies" was fully dropped from KLOU's branding like many of those stations looking for a more modern imaging.

As early as November 4, 1991, CBS explored the sale of KLOU, as its purchase of Midwest Communications–including WLTE in Minneapolis–St. Paul–brought the number of CBS-owned FM stations to 13, at a time when the Federal Communications Commission (FCC) capped owners to 12 such stations. CBS retained KLOU until March 1997, when it was swapped to Entercom along with KPIX-FM in San Francisco in exchange for Entercom's San Francisco station, KITS; this separated KLOU from KMOX, which CBS kept as a standalone property. That August, Entercom turned around and swapped the station to American Radio Systems (ARS) for WDAF and KUDL in Kansas City, Missouri; KCTC in Sacramento, California; and $3 million. ARS already owned KFNS, KSD, KSD-FM, KEZK-FM, and KYKY in the market. ARS was itself purchased by CBS in 1998, but the Department of Justice (DOJ) required the resale of KLOU and KSD-FM, along with four stations in Boston and WOCT in Baltimore, due to antitrust concerns: in St. Louis, the combination of KMOX and the ARS stations would have given CBS four of the top seven stations, and 49% of the market's radio revenues (above the DOJ's 40% cap). That May, CBS agreed to swap KLOU and KSD-FM; WCAO and WOCT in Baltimore; and KOME and KUFX in San Jose, California, to Jacor for WAZU, WHOK-FM, and WLVQ in Columbus, Ohio; and KSGS and KMJZ in Minneapolis–St. Paul. Jacor, in turn, announced its merger with Clear Channel Communications in October 1998.

KLOU was the flagship radio station for the NFL's St. Louis Rams from 2000 until 2009, when WXOS took over the rights.

=== Classic hits ===
On June 18, 2007, KLOU dropped its "103.3 KLOU" branding and oldies format for a more classic hits approach as "My 103.3", phasing out 1960s music at the time. The new sound was launched with Bachman-Turner Overdrive's "Takin' Care of Business". "My" was dropped within a couple of years as that naming trend died, and the station returned to branding simply as "KLOU 103.3".

Logo as "Rewind 103.3"

Logo as "Oldies 103.3"

On April 29, 2010, the station rebranded as "Rewind 103.3", again as part of a naming trend, and with that branding only lasting just over a year. The station returned to the "Oldies 103.3" branding on May 31, 2011, with the station's focus turning towards an 1980s focus surrounded by fewer late 1970s hits and more music from the 1990s transitioning into its playlist.

KLOU carries rebroadcasts of American Top 40 with Casey Kasem from the 1970s and 1980s on the weekends; the station had been the outlet for the show in the same era in the past.

=== HD Radio subchannels ===
Unlike most of Clear Channel/iHeartMedia's FM radio stations, KLOU's HD Radio digital subchannel did not originally carry automated programming. Instead, the station, until 2009, aired a format called All Rams Radio, a year-round rebroadcast of complete St. Louis Rams games. During the offseason, games from as far back as the 1990s often aired on the subchannel. Even though iHeartMedia owns several flagship stations of NFL teams, St. Louis was the only market in which Clear Channel used this concept. It was also available through the station's app (the arrangement pre-dated the introduction of the iHeartRadio app), though live games were not included. The channel was wound down in 2009 after WXOS acquired the Rams radio rights.

After the departure of the Rams, the HD2 subchannel carried a complementary automated 1950s/1960s format, then "The Breeze", an automated soft adult contemporary format. The HD2 subchannel was discontinued in the early 2020s to control the cost the station paid out in royalties due to cutbacks within iHeartMedia.
