= KSIV (AM) =

Bott Radio Network station in Clayton–St. Louis, Missouri

- Clayton, Missouri; United States
- Broadcast area: Greater St. Louis
- Frequency: 1320 kHz

Programming
- Format: Christian
- Network: Bott Radio Network

Ownership
- Owner: Bott Radio Network; (Bott Communications, Inc.)
- Sister stations: KSIV-FM

History
- First air date: January 1, 1947
- Former call signs: KXLW (1947–1960); KMYT (1960); KXLW (1960–1975); KADI (1975–1978); KKOJ (1978–1979); KADI (1979–1982)
- Call sign meaning: "St. Louis' Inspirational Voice"

Technical information
- Licensing authority: FCC
- Facility ID: 6499
- Class: B
- Power: 4,600 watts (day); 270 watts (night)
- Transmitter coordinates: 38°36′26″N 90°21′14″W
- Translator: 95.9 K240ES (St. Louis)

Links
- Public license information: Public file; LMS
- Website: bottradionetwork.com

KSIV (1320 AM) is a non-commercial radio station licensed to Clayton, Missouri, and serving the Greater St. Louis region. KSIV airs the Christian talk and teaching programming of the Bott Radio Network and is one of the network's two stations in St. Louis, alongside KSIV-FM (91.5). KSIV's AM transmitter site is located along Deer Creek in Webster Groves, near Brentwood. In addition to a standard analog transmission, KSIV is relayed over low-power FM translator K240ES (95.9 FM) in St. Louis, broadcasting from the master FM tower in Crestwood.

== History ==
=== KXLW ===
1320 AM went on the air at noon on January 1, 1947, as KXLW. Owned by the Saint Louis County Broadcasting Company, the station was conceived as a voice for the events and happenings of St. Louis County. Its programming included a daily farm almanac, "Women's Hour" with society and fashion news, and a noon news/sports hour; general manager Guy Runnion had previously been a newsreader at KMOX. The original tower in Olivette was ordered removed that June by a district judge, however, because the facility violated that town's zoning law; the matter would remain in the courts for years.

On January 1, 1948, KXLW celebrated its first year on air by activating KXLW-FM 101.1, allowing the daytime-only radio station to add nighttime service and giving St. Louis its first full-time FM station. The county station endured a more than two-month-long strike by its engineers in December 1948 and early 1949 because there was a dispute over who should play recordings: engineers or disc jockeys. During the strike, the station ran with non-union engineers, but it was still off the air six hours one day in January because of what general manager Guy Runnion called an "act of sabotage". Additionally, one morning, county police arrested engineers and announcers at the Olivette transmitter site because of the zoning issue.

Ultimately, it was Runnion who exited; under pressure from shareholders, he sold his interests to Lee, Silas, and T. Virgil Sloan, staying on as general manager until August when the new Brentwood site was ready. On November 13, KXLW-FM left the air for good, the third such closure in two weeks in St. Louis.

KXLW was purchased from the Sloan brothers in 1952 by John Kluge, who owned a radio station in Silver Spring, Maryland, and station director Les Ware. In December 1957, the $500,000 sale of KXLW to Richard Miller's Big Signal Radio Broadcasting Co. was announced and filed with the FCC; it was approved in April 1958.

=== The Miller years ===
Richard Miller moved from Atlanta to St. Louis to run KXLW, his first radio station. Under Miller, KXLW established itself as a local force in the rhythm and blues format and one of the country's first soul stations. Some of KXLW's Black personalities, from noted jazz DJ Jesse D. "Spider" Burks to Lou "Fatha" Thimes Sr., went on to fame in the market. In one case, a newsman who had grown up listening to the station and changed his name Al Gay to Al Sanders—at the suggestion of Miller—rose to become news and program director, and later to a lengthy career in TV news in Baltimore. In another, Miller lured DJ Columbus Gregory from KATZ by doubling his salary. However, much local talent was lured away in 1968 when KWK was revived after losing its license, this time as a new soul station.

The station made two abortive attempts to change its call letters. It applied for, but ultimately decided not to use, the KELI call letters in 1959, and from March 1–24, 1960, the station was officially KMYT. In 1969, Miller acquired KADI (96.5 FM), which had previously been the twin of KADY (1460 AM).

Miller changed KXLW to KADI in 1975, matching the FM station; it broke off again in 1978 as KKOJ and tried to fill the market gap for Top 40 music on AM. The next year, with Miller sensing a void in the market after KXOK flipped from rock to adult contemporary, 1320 AM returned to simulcasting KADI's rock sound and sharing its call letters. The AM station went through constant turnover of formats as music listening shifted to the FM band, with KADI AM drifting toward adult contemporary by 1981.

=== Bott era ===
In 1981, Miller announced that he would sell KXLW after nearly 25 years to the Bott Radio Network for $900,000. Bott religious programming began to air on 1320 AM on April 16, 1982; at the same time, the call letters were changed to the present KSIV, for "St. Louis' Inspirational Voice".

In 1996, Bott acquired noncommercial FM station KSLH from the St. Louis city school system and relaunched it as KSIV-FM.
