= KTLK-FM =

Coordinates: 38.573°N 90.325°W

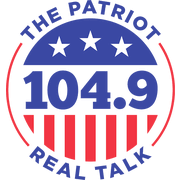
- Columbia, Illinois; United States
- Broadcast area: Greater St. Louis
- Frequency: 104.9 MHz (HD Radio)
- Branding: 104.9 The Patriot

Programming
- Format: Conservative talk
- Subchannels: HD2: Adult R&B
- Affiliations: 24/7 News; Premiere Networks; Westwood One

Ownership
- Owner: iHeartMedia; (iHM Licenses, LLC)
- Sister stations: KATZ, KATZ-FM, KLOU, KSD, KSLZ, W279AQ

History
- First air date: February 15, 1964
- Former call signs: WCBW (1964–1997); WIMJ (1997); KMJM-FM (1997–2012); KBWX (2012–2016); KLLT (2016–2020); KMJM-FM (2020–2021)
- Call sign meaning: Talk radio

Technical information
- Licensing authority: FCC
- Facility ID: 13793
- Class: C3
- ERP: 8,400 watts
- HAAT: 175 meters (574 ft)

Links
- Public license information: Public file; LMS
- Webcast: Listen live (via iHeartRadio); Listen live (HD2)
- Website: 1049thepatriot.iheart.com

KTLK-FM (104.9 MHz) is a commercial radio station licensed to Columbia, Illinois, and serving Greater St. Louis. Owned and operated by iHeartMedia, the station airs a conservative talk format known as "104.9 The Patriot". Studios and offices are on Highlands Plaza Drive in St. Louis just south of Forest Park.

KTLK-FM has an effective radiated power (ERP) of 8,400 watts. The transmitter is in the Resurrection Cemetery in Shrewsbury, amid the towers for other St. Louis FM and TV stations. KTLK-FM is licensed by the FCC to broadcast using HD Radio technology. The HD-2 digital subchannel carries the urban adult contemporary format previously heard on the main channel, known as "Majic 104.9".

Most of the schedule is made up of nationally syndicated programs, largely from co-owned Premiere Networks.

== History ==
=== WCBW ===
On February 15, 1964, the station first signed on the air. Its original call sign was WCBW. It broadcast from the basement of station owner Joseph Lepp in Columbia, and was a typical small town radio station. In 1980, the station was sold to Continental Broadcasting, becoming the first station in the St. Louis area playing contemporary Christian music, still with a weak 3,000-watt signal. The station was called "104.9 The Bridge" at the time.

In 1993, the station was granted a power upgrade, allowing it to move to the St. Louis Master antenna site in Shrewsbury, and upgrade from 3,000 watts to 25,000 watts, making the 104.9 frequency a full market St. Louis signal. That made the station much more valuable, as did deregulation allowing operators to own several different FM stations in a market in 1996.

=== Majic 105/Majic 104.9 ===
In 1997, the station was sold to Jacor Broadcasting, who also owned urban powerhouse KMJM, “Majic 108”, which was then at 107.7 FM. Instead of installing a new format on the 104.9 frequency, KMJM-FM was relocated to the weaker 104.9 MHz frequency on October 20 of that year to allow its new CHR station KSLZ a better signal into the suburbs on the full 100,000-watt class C 107.7 frequency. After the move, the station rebranded as "Majic 105", which later became "Majic 104.9".

By 1999, Jacor was merged into Clear Channel Communications (now known as iHeartMedia as of September 16, 2014). Clear Channel also owned KATZ AM-FM. KATZ-FM aired an urban adult contemporary format playing mostly adult R&B, while "Majic" played a format consisting mostly of hip hop and current R&B hits. The formats on the two stations were swapped on April 1 of that year, with Majic adopting the urban adult contemporary format from 100.3, while maintaining most of the same staff, and 100.3 was rechristened as "The Beat" with a mainstream urban format that would last until October 2009, when it flipped to modern AC.

=== Wild 104.9 ===
On November 7, 2012, at 9 a.m., KMJM-FM and its urban AC format moved to 100.3 FM (ironically, KATZ-FM's former frequency), replacing classic rock-formatted KBWX ("The Brew"). Simultaneously, the 104.9 frequency changed its format to Rhythmic CHR, branded as "Wild 104.9". KMJM-FM and KBWX also swapped call letters, which were approved on November 15.

"Wild" never really caught on in the Nielsen ratings for the St. Louis market, as it barely got above a 2.0 share during its nearly 4-year existence (the last ratings under the format had KBWX with a mere 1.6 in the September 2016 books).

=== ALT 104-9 ===
On October 11, 2016, KBWX began running liners in between songs redirecting "Wild" listeners to KSLZ. On October 18, at Noon, after playing "2 On" by Tinashe, followed by a commercial break, KBWX flipped to alternative rock as "ALT 104-9". The first song on "ALT" was "Everlong" by the Foo Fighters. The flip gave St. Louis its second alternative outlet, as the station competed against KPNT. The flip also occurred in order to eliminate the format overlap with KMJM, which flipped from classic hip hop back to urban a little over two weeks prior.

With the move, KBWX added "The Woody Show" syndicated from sister station KYSR in Los Angeles for morning drive, marking a return to the market for the show's host, who was on KPNT from 2009 to 2014. On October 25, 2016, KBWX changed call letters to KLLT to match the "ALT" branding.

=== Return of Majic ===
On July 17, 2020, at 10 a.m., KLLT dropped the alternative format and brought the urban AC format and “Majic” branding (which was airing on translator W279AQ (103.7 FM)) back to the 104.9 FM frequency. This is the fifth incarnation for the "Majic" branding in St. Louis, as it originated in 1979 on 107.7 FM, then moved to 104.9 FM in 1997, and then to 100.3 FM in 2012 before being dropped two years later. The format and “Majic” moniker was revived in May 2017 on W279AQ.

The flip came after KLLT registered a 1.0 share in the June 2020 PPM ratings for the market, well behind KPNT’s 5.6 share. KLLT and W279AQ were simulcast until July 27 at midnight, when the latter flipped to the African-American all-news Black Information Network. The KMJM-FM call letters also returned on the 27th.

=== Switch to talk ===
On August 15, 2021, iHeart announced that KMJM-FM would flip to conservative talk as "The Patriot" on August 16 at midnight. Subsequently, the station's former urban AC format and "Majic" branding shifted to KMJM-FM’s HD2 subchannel. The station gave a St. Louis affiliate to a number of Premiere Networks talk shows, whose parent company is iHeartMedia.

"The Patriot" competes against several St. Louis talk radio outlets, including local powerhouses KMOX and KFTK-FM (both owned by Audacy), along with KTRS (partially owned by the St. Louis Cardinals), the "NewsTalkSTL" network originated by KNBS, and KRTK/KVMO. On August 23, 2021, KMJM-FM changed call letters to KTLK-FM to match the new format.
