= KATZ (AM) =

Gospel music radio station in St. Louis

Coordinates: 38°37′2.2″N 90°04′58.4″W

- St. Louis, Missouri; United States
- Broadcast area: Greater St. Louis
- Frequency: 1600 kHz
- Branding: Hallelujah 1600

Programming
- Format: Urban gospel
- Affiliations: Premiere Networks

Ownership
- Owner: iHeartMedia, Inc.; (iHM Licenses, LLC)
- Sister stations: KATZ-FM; KLOU; KSD; KSLZ; KTLK-FM; W279AQ

History
- First air date: January 3, 1955

Technical information
- Licensing authority: FCC
- Facility ID: 48968
- Class: B
- Power: 6,000 watts (day); 3,500 watts (night)

Links
- Public license information: Public file; LMS
- Webcast: Listen live (via iHeartRadio)
- Website: hallelujah1600.iheart.com

KATZ (1600 AM, "Hallelujah 1600") is a commercial radio station licensed to St. Louis, Missouri, United States, serving Greater St. Louis. It airs an urban gospel format and is owned by iHeartMedia, Inc. The studios are on Foundry Way near Interstate 64 in St. Louis.

KATZ's transmitter is on Rock Springs Road at McKinley Avenue in Washington Park, Illinois. KATZ is licensed by the FCC to broadcast a HD digital (hybrid) signal.

== History ==
KATZ signed on the air on January 3, 1955. It has always had the KATZ call sign. It was targeted at the African-American community in St. Louis, playing R&B and soul music. It was an affiliate of the Mutual Broadcasting System's Black Network. Broadcasters who worked at KATZ in the 1950s and 1960s include Gloria Pritchard, Dave Dixon, Jesse "Spider" Burks, Bernard Hayes, and Willie Mae Gracy.

In 1957, KATZ's ownership was transferred from the original owner, Bernice Schwartz, to Rollins Broadcasting. In 1960, Laclede Radio Inc. purchased the station. Laclede maintained control of the station until 1986. Inter Urban Broadcasting, a minority-owned and local company, purchased KATZ and its sister station KATZ-FM.

Clear Channel Communications acquired KATZ in 1999. Clear Channel changed its name to iHeartMedia in 2014.

KATZ's programming was also heard on 25-watt FM translator K227DS at 93.3 MHz until July 22, 2026, when iHeartMedia turned in its license.
