= KSLZ =

Contemporary hit radio station in St. Louis

- St. Louis, Missouri; United States
- Broadcast area: Greater St. Louis
- Frequency: 107.7 MHz (HD Radio)
- Branding: Z107-7

Programming
- Language: English
- Format: Contemporary hit radio
- Subchannels: HD2: Pride Radio
- Affiliations: Premiere Networks; KSDK (weather)

Ownership
- Owner: iHeartMedia, Inc.; (iHM Licenses, LLC)
- Sister stations: KATZ, KATZ-FM, KLOU, KSD, KTLK-FM, W279AQ

History
- First air date: September 20, 1968
- Former call signs: KACO (1968–1970); KGRV (1970–1972); KKSS (1972–1979); KMJM (1979–1997)
- Call sign meaning: St. Louis

Technical information
- Licensing authority: FCC
- Facility ID: 48960
- Class: C0
- ERP: 100,000 watts
- HAAT: 313 meters (1,027 ft)
- Transmitter coordinates: 38°34′27.9″N 90°19′31.9″W

Links
- Public license information: Public file; LMS
- Webcast: Listen live (via iHeartRadio)
- Website: z1077.iheart.com; prideradiostl.iheart.com; (HD2)

KSLZ (107.7 FM, "Z107-7") is a commercial radio station in St. Louis, Missouri. It airs a contemporary hit radio format and is owned by iHeartMedia, Inc. The station's studios are on Foundry Way near Interstate 64 in St. Louis.

KSLZ is a Class C0 station. It has an effective radiated power (ERP) of 100,000 watts, the maximum for most stations. Its transmitter is off MacKenzie Road in the Shrewsbury neighborhood of St. Louis, amid the towers for area FM and TV stations. KSLZ uses HD Radio technology, its digital subchannel carries "Pride Radio," an iHeartRadio service for LGBTQ listeners.

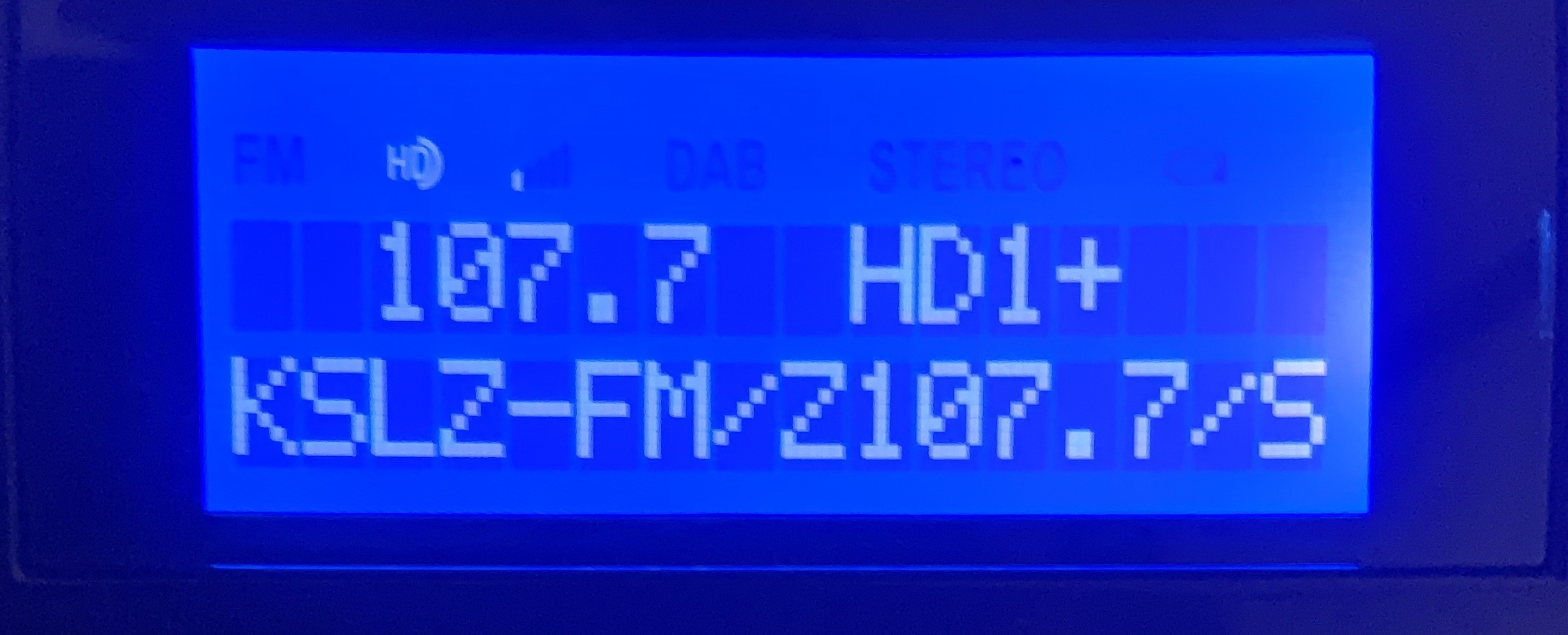

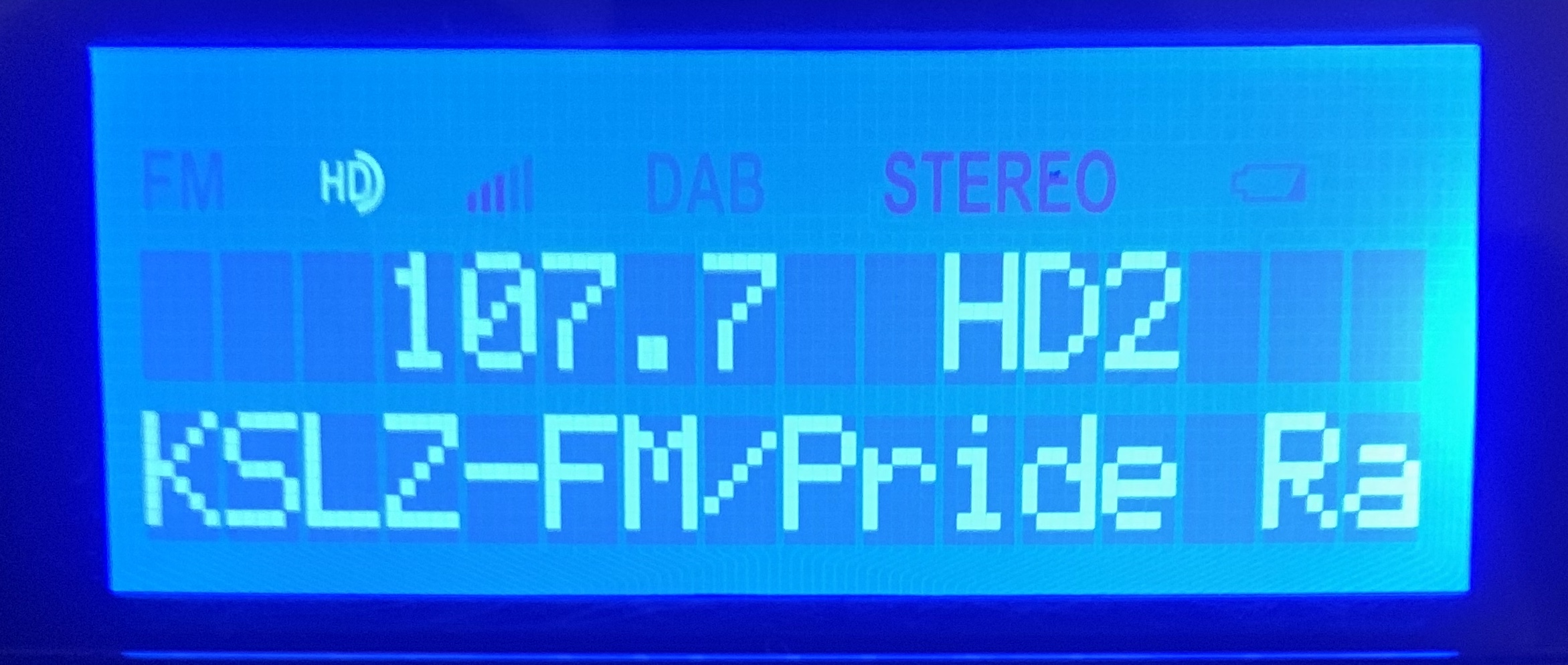
KSLZ broadcasting in HD including its subchannels.

== History ==
=== 1968–1979: Early years ===
The station signed on the air on September 20, 1968. The original call sign was KACO, and it was owned by the Apollo Broadcasting Company. It aired an adult contemporary (AC) and middle of the road (MOR) format. A fire at the transmitter took the station off the air in January 1970.

Two months later, the station returned to the air, changed its call letters to KGRV, and relaunched as "Music for Groovy Adults," offering a more upbeat AC format. This lasted until 1972, when it once again changed call letters, this time to KKSS, and rebranded as "Kiss 108". By 1974, KKSS switched to country music. A year later, KKSS flipped to an R&B format, dubbed "Black in Stereo". In February 1979, KKSS altered its R&B format and adopted the moniker "Studio 108," with a hybrid disco music and R&B format, competing with WZEN (now KATZ-FM).

=== 1979–1997: CHUrban/UC ===
In June 1979, the call sign was changed to KMJM and rebranded as "The New Majic 108 FM, Where the Music is the Majic!". KMJM Was catered to both African-American and Caucasian-American listeners as the St. Louis market's first "CHUrban" station (a forerunner to the Rhythmic Contemporary format). At the time, the station was owned by Keymarket Communications. KMJM was ranked among the top five stations in the St. Louis Arbitron ratings during the 1980's, as it shifted towards a mainstream UC direction.

In May 1988, KMJM was sold to Noble Communications of San Diego for $19 million. KMJM's FM signal was one of the best in the St. Louis area, as the station emerged as the top urban station in the market. Jacor bought the station in 1997.

=== 1997–present: Top 40 ===
On October 20, 1997, at midnight, after 18 years on 107.7 FM, KMJM was moved to recently purchased sister station WCBW (104.9 FM), which aired a Christian music format. After a 12-hour stunt with a looped heartbeat and announcements redirecting KMJM listeners to the new frequency and the launch of a new format on 107.7 later that day, KSLZ and its current top 40/CHR format, branded as "Z107-7", debuted. The flip was to fill a format hole left by WKBQ, who dropped the format for modern AC on January 24 of that year. The final song on "Majic" was "Good Girls" by Joe, while the first song on "Z" was "Get Ready For This" by 2 Unlimited.

=== Morning shows ===
At first, KSLZ was the St. Louis affiliate for the MJ Morning Show, based at Tampa sister station WFLZ, and the only affiliate for the show outside of the Eastern Time Zone. After the show ended in February 2012, KSLZ became the St. Louis affiliate for The Bobby Bones Show. After Bones relaunched his show to air on country stations in February 2013, KSLZ replaced him with Elvis Duran and the Morning Show. In December 2017, KSLZ dropped Duran for local host Jordan DeSocio. As part of company-wide layoffs, DeSocio exited the station in November 2020, and was replaced by "The Jubal Show", based at Seattle sister station KBKS.

== HD Radio ==
KSLZ made the conversion to HD Radio in 2006. 107.7-HD2 initially carried a New CHR format branded as "Z107-7 Amped." On June 22, 2016, KSLZ-HD2 switched to "Pride Radio".
