= KSIV-FM =

Bott Radio Network station in St. Louis

- St. Louis, Missouri; United States
- Broadcast area: Greater St. Louis
- Frequency: 91.5 MHz
- Branding: Bott Radio Network

Programming
- Format: Christian
- Network: Bott Radio Network

Ownership
- Owner: Bott Broadcasting Company; (Community Broadcasting, Inc.)
- Sister stations: KSIV

History
- First air date: April 13, 1950
- Former call signs: KSLH (1950–1996)
- Call sign meaning: "St. Louis' Inspirational Voice" (adopted from co-owned AM)

Technical information
- Licensing authority: FCC
- Facility ID: 4276
- Class: C1
- ERP: 85,000 watts
- HAAT: 309 m (1,014 ft)
- Transmitter coordinates: 38°34′27.7″N 90°19′31.5″W

Links
- Public license information: Public file; LMS
- Website: bottradionetwork.com/station/91-5-fm-st-louis-mo/

KSIV-FM (91.5 FM) is a non-commercial educational radio station licensed to St. Louis, Missouri, featuring a Christian format as one of two Bott Radio Network stations in Greater St. Louis, the other being KSIV (1320 AM). KSIV-FM's transmitter is located in Shrewsbury.

This station has been a Bott outlet since 1996, though the license history stretches back to the establishment of KSLH, an educational station that was owned by St. Louis Public Schools, in 1950.

== History ==
=== KSLH: the educational station ===
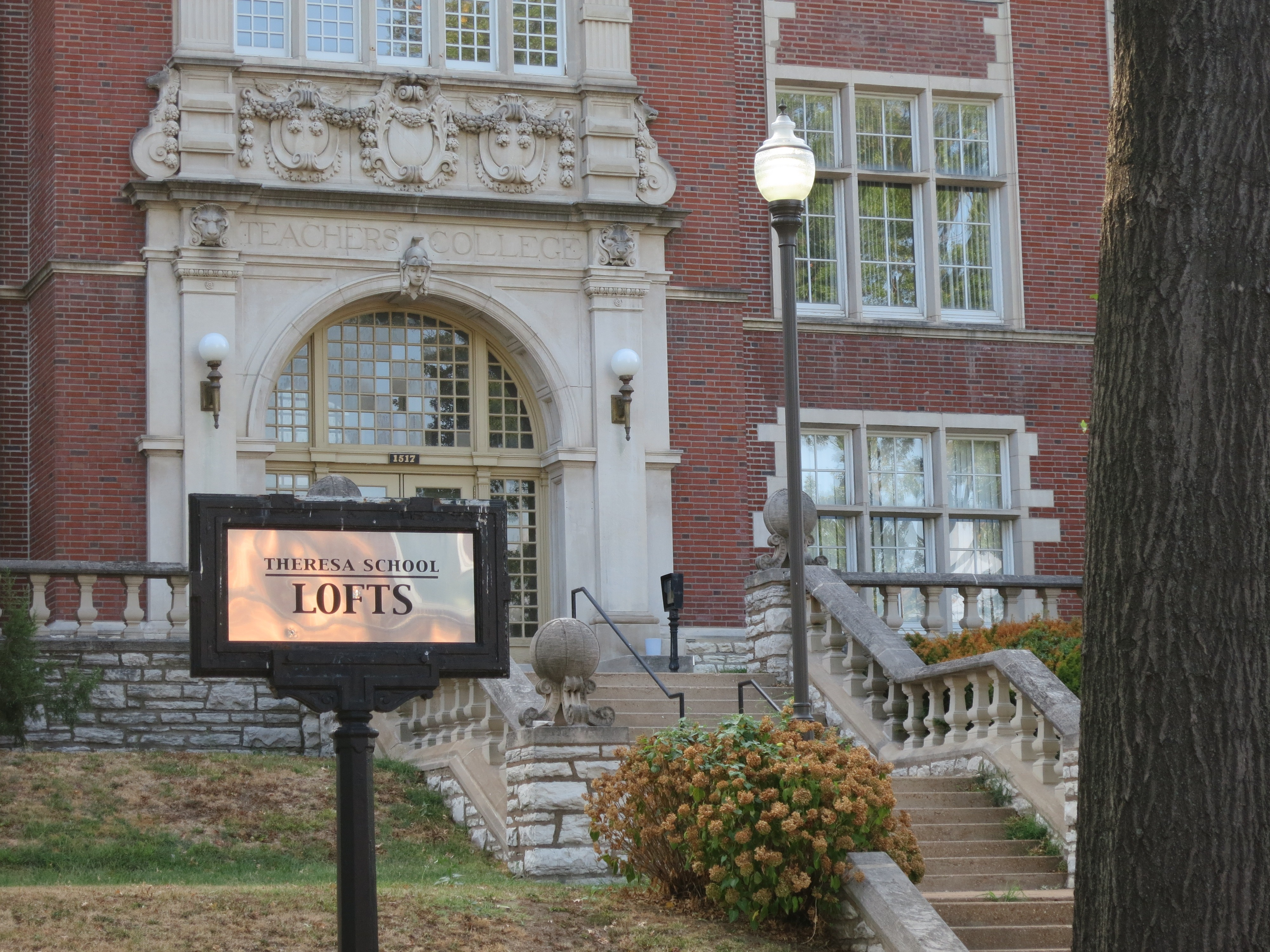
As KSLH, the station operated from the district's audiovisual building, the former Harris Teacher's College, now converted into loft apartments.

The St. Louis city board of education applied to the FCC to operate a new noncommercial FM radio station on September 25, 1944, which was granted by the Federal Communications Commission on June 11, 1947. The station took nearly three years to be built; in May 1949, the board approved $60,874 in bids for the construction of the facility at the district's audiovisual building at 1517 S. Theresa Ave. By year's end, construction was nearly complete on the facility, including a 370-foot (110 m) tower, as well as a total of five studios and two control rooms. KSLH finally began broadcasts on April 13, 1950, with receivers set up in 191 city elementary schools. Despite coming on late in the school year, KSLH quickly settled into a schedule. All but three of the station's initial 15-minute programs were for grade school students; the exceptions were high school fare on poetry, choral music, and business.

KSLH devoted itself almost entirely to instruction for most of its life. By 1953, it broadcast from 9:10 a.m. to 4:15 p.m., matching the school day; it produced about 300 educational programs in a given year, alongside content obtained in the National Association of Educational Broadcasters program exchange. Eight different planning committees worked with teachers on the development of radio courses, while many programs aired at different times to suit the needs of the city schools. In its first decade of broadcasting, the station produced 2,878 fifteen-minute programs. In addition to NAEB-supplied programs, KSLH educational broadcasts were also supplied by the state of Missouri, the United Nations, and even the Canadian Broadcasting Corporation and BBC. Among its staff was at least one alumnus who went on to a lengthy career in St. Louis broadcasting: future KMOV-TV anchor Julius Hunter, who at one time taught in the school system, worked at the station as a writer-producer in the late 1960s.

The station, however, still broadcast during the day, and it was silent entirely on weekends and when school was not in session; aside from an afternoon hour of adult shows, it did not expand into evenings, saying the cost of doing so was prohibitive. Even when St. Louis community station KDNA sought to enter into a time-share agreement in 1973 to use the KSLH facility when KSLH was off the air, the board refused, and the FCC rejected the group's petition to force the board into such a situation without its consent.

=== Airtime and equipment problems ===
KSLH operated with its original equipment for almost all of its ownership by the St. Louis city school board. In 1978, the board applied for $75,000 in federal funds, which, combined with the school board's own money, would have enabled a power increase from 12,100 to 100,000 watts and the replacement of the 1950s equipment. The school system tried again in 1986, seeking $285,000 for similar modifications.

Another problem that developed for KSLH in the 1980s was its limited hours of operation. As the Federal Communications Commission pushed stations to begin broadcasting at least 12 hours per day, school board officials looked for solutions. In one 1981 proposal approved by the school board, KWMU-FM, the public radio station at the University of Missouri-St. Louis, was to supply National Public Radio programs to the station for a fee one-third that of other proposals, particularly news and current affairs programming. At the time, KWMU eschewed most NPR talk shows to air classical music, and WSIE in Edwardsville, Illinois, lacked full-market coverage of St. Louis, meaning that listeners could not pick up such NPR programs as All Things Considered; at the time, St. Louis was the largest market in the country where the show was not aired. Even though the KWMU plan never came to fruition, the station did begin carrying programming outside of the school day, including the school board's meetings every other Tuesday night and coverage of the high schools' Public High League football and basketball. It also contracted Michael C. Ermatinger to provide programming in the evenings; in 1987, Ermatinger was convicted on sexual assault charges.

=== Reorganization, Webster University operation, and LCMS sale attempt ===
Trouble in the St. Louis school system, however, would make an impact on KSLH. In October 1988, a federal judge ordered the school board to draft a plan to reorganize its administration and improve efficiencies, while the Missouri attorney general's office made its own proposal six months later. By May 1989, the school board had announced 25-percent cuts to its administrative staff, with KSLH and its five staff slated for total elimination.

Proposals to fill the KSLH void were quick to come in. One was from Urban Communications, Inc., which would have reinvented KSLH as a minority-oriented radio station and carried out the power increase to 100 kW. However, the school board voted unanimously a month after announcing cuts to restore funding for KSLH.

Ultimately, in 1991, the school board cut back its spending on KSLH from $250,000 to $100,000 annually and entered into an agreement with Webster University, under which Webster supplied some programming for air on KSLH. Webster maintained studios on the campus and fed jazz programming back to the KSLH transmitter by telephone line. Under Webster interim operation, KSLH operated during the day on weekdays and continuously on Friday, Saturday and Sunday nights.

In 1993, the school board unanimously voted to accept bids for KSLH, with a minimum asking price of $250,000. Of the 13 bids received by the school board, the highest bid, of $1 million, was made by the Lutheran Church–Missouri Synod, which planned to use the KSLH frequency to simulcast and expand the Christian talk and teaching on its KFUO AM 850, a daytime-only station. Filed in February 1994, the Lutheran Church application languished for over 18 months and eventually was terminated, as the synod was facing a license challenge over hiring practices at the KFUO stations.

=== KSIV-FM ===
The school board, however, wound up making money on the delay. In October 1995, a second Christian buyer emerged to acquire KSLH: Community Broadcasting, Inc., the non-profit stations arm of the Bott Radio Network, owners of KSIV AM 1320 in Clayton since 1982, which paid $1.625 million for the license and began operating 91.5 in 1996. Under Bott, the newly recalled KSIV-FM relocated to the Crestwood master FM tower south of St. Louis in Shrewsbury, Missouri, and began stereo broadcasts for the first time in its history.
