= KSTL (AM) =

Radio station in St. Louis

- St. Louis, Missouri; United States
- Broadcast area: Greater St. Louis
- Frequency: 690 kHz
- Branding: Jubilee 690

Programming
- Format: Urban gospel

Ownership
- Owner: Church of God in Christ, Inc.

History
- First air date: June 4, 1948
- Call sign meaning: St. Louis

Technical information
- Licensing authority: FCC
- Facility ID: 73300
- Class: D
- Power: 1,000 watts (day); 18 watts (night)
- Transmitter coordinates: 38°37′01″N 90°10′17″W

Links
- Public license information: Public file; LMS
- Webcast: Listen live
- Website: jubilee690.com

KSTL (690 AM, "Jubilee 690") is a commercial radio station licensed to St. Louis, Missouri, United States, and serving the Greater St. Louis area of Missouri and Illinois. Owned by Church of God in Christ, Inc., it airs an urban gospel format with assorted Christian talk and teaching programs. The studios are on Olive Boulevard in Creve Coeur, Missouri.

KSTL's transmitter is located in East St. Louis, north of the I-55/Illinois Route 3 interchange.

== History ==
The station signed on the air on June 4, 1948. It was a daytimer station in its early decades that required going off the air at night. In the 1970s, it aired a country music format.

KSTL's studios were formerly located on the historic Laclede's Landing in downtown Saint Louis. They later moved to the Saint Louis suburbs, in the same building as their former sister station, KJSL 630 AM. KSTL originally played only music, with KJSL broadcasting live and recorded Christian talk and teaching programs. KSTL expanded its format beyond Christian music and into teaching ministries in 1995, using its own separate studio.

In 1994, Taft Harris was the station's general manager. Juanita Winston, the director of Operations, helmed the station's day-to-day operations. In March 2004, radioink.com voted Taft Harris one of the Most Influential African-Americans in Radio. The current general manager is Katrina Chase.
