= KATZ-FM =

Urban contemporary radio station in Bridgeton, Missouri

Coordinates: 38.685°N 90.382°W

- Bridgeton, Missouri; United States
- Broadcast area: Greater St. Louis
- Frequency: 100.3 MHz (HD Radio)
- Branding: 100.3 The Beat

Programming
- Format: Mainstream urban
- Subchannels: HD2: Black Information Network (News)
- Affiliations: Premiere Networks

Ownership
- Owner: iHeartMedia, Inc.; (iHM Licenses, LLC)
- Sister stations: KATZ; KLOU; KSD; KSLZ; KTLK-FM; W279AQ

History
- First air date: September 1961
- Former call signs: WOKZ-FM (1961–1978); WZEN (1978–1979); WZEN-FM (1979–1988); KATZ-FM (1988–1995); KNJZ-FM (1995–1996); KATZ-FM (1996–2009); WSDD (2009–2011); WSGX (2011–2012); KBWX (2012); KMJM-FM (2012–2017)

Technical information
- Licensing authority: FCC
- Facility ID: 48958
- Class: C3
- ERP: 17,000 watts
- HAAT: 120 meters (390 ft)
- Translator: HD2: 103.7 W279AQ (Mascoutah)

Links
- Public license information: Public file; LMS
- Webcast: Listen live (via iHeartRadio)
- Website: thebeatstl.iheart.com

KATZ-FM (100.3 MHz, "The Beat") is a commercial radio station licensed to Bridgeton, Missouri, and serving Greater St. Louis. It broadcasts a mainstream urban radio format and is owned by iHeartMedia, Inc. It airs two nationally syndicated shows on weekdays: The Breakfast Club in morning drive time and Way Up with Angela Yee in middays. KATZ-FM's studios are on Foundry Way at Forest Park Avenue, off Interstate 64 in downtown St. Louis.

KATZ-FM is a Class C3 station. It has an effective radiated power (ERP) of 17,000 watts using a directional antenna. Its transmitter is on Kin-Arc Court off Meeks Boulevard in Olivette. The station broadcasts using HD Radio technology. Its HD2 digital subchannel carries the Black Information Network, an all-news radio service from iHeart which feeds FM translator W279AQ at 103.7 MHz.

== History ==
=== The "original" 100.3 The Beat ===
The station, which signed on in September 1961 as WOKZ-FM in Alton, Illinois, originally inherited the R&B format under the call letters WZEN, "Disco 100" (which began on April 18, 1979), which would later change call letters to KATZ-FM–matching sister station KATZ (1600 AM)–in 1988. But under its original owners, it was never successful and was always behind KMJM in terms of ratings and audience, which dates back to their days as rival disco outlets in the late 1970s. In 1980, the station flipped to contemporary hit radio, and then flipped to urban AC the following year.

After KMJM's owners bought KATZ and became its sister station in the 1990s, they would go through a flux of formats, including jazz as "Jazz 100", urban oldies, smooth jazz as KNJZ (which started on April 18, 1994, after a weekend stunt of all-Kenny G music), and then back to urban AC (as "Kiss 100.3", which started on September 11, 1995). But that all came to an end on April 1, 1999, when it swapped formats with KMJM. KMJM picked up the urban AC format of KATZ; in return, KATZ picked up the urban contemporary format from KMJM, and rebranded as "100.3 The Beat". For a while, it had performed successfully under Clear Channel Communications ownership and had proven to be a good complement to Rhythmic-leaning Top 40 sister KSLZ. Its competitors were urban station WHHL and urban AC station WFUN-FM.

KATZ-FM had picked up the Steve Harvey Morning Show, a show syndicated through Premiere Radio Networks, owned by KATZ-FM parent Clear Channel Communications, on November 27, 2006. At first, it seemed that KMJM should have gotten the show because it plays music on an urban AC format due to Steve's history of not playing songs with "questionable" content – primarily rap. But KATZ was chosen because Clear Channel did not see it fit to replace Tony Scott, who was doing morning drive at KMJM.

However, after changes in programming at the Clear Channel St. Louis cluster, the Steve Harvey Morning Show began running on KMJM, with former morning host Tony Scott being displaced to PM Drive.

=== "Beat" Ends; "Sound" Debuts ===
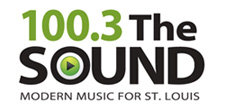
100.3 The Sound logo, 2010

In September 2009, the station's ratings began to slide. Clear Channel would announce that they would end "The Beat" and go with a new format, with "The Beat" being relocated to the station's secondary HD Radio subchannel. At 12 p.m. on October 30, 2009, after playing Boyz II Men's End of the Road, KATZ-FM began stunting with Halloween music as "Halloween 100.3". On November 1, the station shifted their stunt to Christmas music under the name "Christmas 100.3". Finally, at 12:01 a.m. on December 26, 2009, "100.3 The Sound" debuted with a Modern Adult Contemporary/Modern Rock hybrid format and new call letters WSDD. The first song played on "The Sound" was Owl City's "Fireflies". On October 2, 2010, WSDD moved its transmitter to Overland, Missouri, and its city of license to Bridgeton, Missouri. Despite an overall decrease in power, the new signal now covers a greater portion of the population core of the St. Louis area.

=== Gen X Radio ===
On December 26, 2010, exactly one year after its debut, WSDD flipped to an all-1990s hits format and adopted the "Gen X Radio" moniker. The first song on "Gen X Radio" was "Get Ready For This" by 2 Unlimited. Although the format emphasized songs from the 1990s, they also played hits from the 1980s, 2000s, and some remaining currents from the previous format. On January 3, 2011, WSDD changed its call letters to WSGX to go with the "Gen X" branding.

=== The Brew ===
On May 23, 2012, at noon, WSGX changed their format to classic rock, branded as "100.3 The Brew". The final song on "Gen X" was "No Rain" by Blind Melon, while the first song on "The Brew" was "I Wanna Rock" by Twisted Sister. On July 10, 2012, WSGX changed its call letters to KBWX. During its run as "The Brew", the station aired the Indianapolis-based Bob & Tom Show in morning drive.

=== Majic 100.3 ===
On November 7, 2012, at 9 a.m., just five months after The Brew's debut, KBWX ended the classic rock format, and became the new home of KMJM's urban adult contemporary format, and rebranded as "Majic 100.3" (their former frequency, 104.9 FM, flipped to rhythmic CHR and took the KBWX calls, while 100.3 received the KMJM-FM call letters a few days later on November 15). In March 2013, the station shifted its playlist to include more current and recurrent hip hop music, similar to KMJM's former wide-ranging urban contemporary format before altering to urban AC in 1999. Due to low ratings, the station dropped most hip hop music in early 2014.

=== "Beat" returns ===
On November 18, 2014, at noon, the station returned to the "100.3 The Beat" moniker, and flipped to a classic hip hop format. On September 30, 2016, at noon, the format was shifted back to urban contemporary, returning the format to the frequency after seven years and five other formats. The move came along with the addition of the syndicated Breakfast Club for mornings.

On December 12, 2017, the station changed call letters back to KATZ-FM.

== W279AQ ==
W279AQ
Relays KATZ-HD2, Bridgeton
- Mascoutah, Illinois; United States
- Broadcast area: Greater St. Louis
- Frequency: 103.7 MHz FM
- Branding: St Louis’ BIN 103.7

Programming
- Format: Black-oriented news
- Affiliations: Black Information Network

Ownership
- Owner: Educational Media Foundation
- Operator: iHeartMedia
- Sister stations: KATZ, KATZ-FM, KLOU, KSD, KSLZ, KTLK-FM

History
- First air date: June 19, 2014; 12 years ago

Technical information
- Licensing authority: FCC
- Facility ID: 118287
- Class: D
- ERP: 250 watts
- HAAT: 217 meters (712 ft)

Links
- Public license information: Public file; LMS
- Webcast: Listen Live
- Website: stlouis.binnews.com

W279AQ (103.7 FM) is a radio station in St. Louis, Missouri, branded as "BIN 103.7". Owned by Educational Media Foundation, the station is operated by iHeartMedia via a leasing agreement. Its transmitter is located in Shrewsbury and operates from studios in St. Louis south of Forest Park. It broadcasts an all-news radio format under iHeartMedia's Black Information Network, targeting St. Louis's African American community.

=== History ===
==== 2013-2015: Rock ====
In early June 2014, W279AQ began testing its signal on the Crestwood FM Tower in Shrewsbury and began simulcasting KLOU's HD2 sub-channel, which dropped its 50s/60s hits format and began stunting with songs featuring the word "man" in the title. On June 16, the stunting shifted to a loop of Rick Astley's "Never Gonna Give You Up". Finally, on June 19, at 1:03 p.m., KLOU-HD2/W279AQ flipped to Active Rock as "Louie 103-7".

==== 2015-2017: Contemporary Christian ====
On November 19, 2015, W279AQ/KLOU-HD2 began stunting with Christmas music. At Midnight on December 28, 2015, W279AQ/KLOU-HD2 flipped to contemporary Christian as "Up 103-7".

==== 2017-2020: Urban AC ====
On May 24, 2017, at 6 a.m., after playing "No Man Is an Island" by Tenth Avenue North, KLOU-HD2/W279AQ began stunting again, this time with songs featuring the word "magic" in the title. On May 26, 2017, at 10:37 a.m., W279AQ switched its primary feed to KMJM-FM's HD2 sub-channel, and flipped to Urban AC as "Majic 103.7", returning the heritage brand to the market for the first time since November 2014, when KMJM-FM flipped to classic hip hop and rebranded as "The Beat" (another heritage brand in the St. Louis market). The first song on the newly revived "Majic" was "Family Affair" by Mary J. Blige. This is the fourth incarnation for the "Majic" branding in St. Louis, as it originated in 1979 on 107.7, then moved to 104.9 in 1997, and then to 100.3 in 2012 before the format was dropped two years later.

==== 2020-present: All-News ====
On July 17, 2020, at 10 a.m., the Urban AC format and “Majic” branding was moved back to 104.9 FM, displacing the alternative-formatted “ALT 104.9.” On July 27, at Midnight, KATZ-FM-HD2/W279AQ flipped to the Black Information Network all-news service.
