= The Rose of Old St. Louis =

Work of fiction

The Rose of Old St. Louis (published in 1904, written by Mary Dillon) is a historical, fictional novel, based on the founding of St. Louis, Missouri. It chronicles a boy who is first coming to St. Louis and his adventures there.

== Plot ==
Told in first person, the reader meets the protagonist, a young boy from Philadelphia, just arriving to St. Louis on a boat. As a boy, he had dreamed of touring the world, and so this was his first major exhibition. He first worries about how he will be accepted into this new society, who he will meet, and what will happen to him, but all this washes away when he meets the "rose" of St. Louis, Pelagie.

Falling quickly and ardently in love, he continues to court her through a series of pursuits in both America and Paris. However, while in Paris Eventually, they do fall in love, but soon, Pelagie and her family are in danger from Napoleon. He helps them escape, but not before accidentally seeing the signing of the great treaty, and being held captive for a while by the first consul.

Later, when he returns to the states, he finds that Pelagie has moved on and married someone else, believing that it would be better to be married to a gentleman. Heartbroken, the hero continues to return home, remembering his time in St. Louis. He is invited to dine with President Jefferson.

== Reviews ==
In her forward, Dillon explicitly states that she does not want this book to be taken as direct history, however it does remain "absolutely faithful" to what happened. In addition, she put in a great deal of work to ensure that even the geography and customs were accurate to the time. For this reason and when looking at the age and details of the book, many people comment on details and the amount of research necessary for this and are amazed at how accurate many of the descriptions are. Though written many years after the events are supposed to take place, Dillon succeeded at depicting St. Louis. One review even commented on the "extensive amount of research" necessary to write such a book and the "delight" she felt when reading it.

== References in pop culture ==
Dillon's book is often thought to be referenced in various movies.
