= National Register of Historic Places listings in Buena Vista, Virginia =

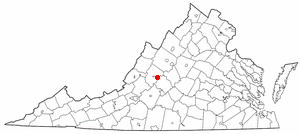
Location of Buena Vista in Virginia

This is a list of the National Register of Historic Places listings in Buena Vista, Virginia.

This is intended to be a complete list of the properties and districts on the National Register of Historic Places in the independent city of Buena Vista, Virginia, United States. The locations of National Register properties and districts for which the latitude and longitude coordinates are included below, may be seen in an online map.

There are 7 properties and districts listed on the National Register in the city.

This National Park Service list is complete through NPS recent listings posted January 2, 2026.

== Current listings ==
	Name on the Register	Image	Date listed	Location	City or town	Description
1	Buena Vista Colored School	Buena Vista Colored School	April 2, 2003 (#03000191)	30th St. and Aspen Ave. 37°44′40″N 79°21′11″W	Buena Vista	
2	Buena Vista Downtown Historic District	Buena Vista Downtown Historic District	September 30, 2009 (#09000792)	2000 and 2100 blocks of Magnolia Ave. and adjacent blocks 37°44′04″N 79°21′16″W	Buena Vista	
3	Columbian Paper Company		August 12, 2024 (#100010685)	1 Bontex Drive; 37°44′39″N 79°21′52″W	Buena Vista	
4	Parry McCluer High School		January 9, 2026 (#100012529)	2329 Chestnut Avenue; 37°44′13″N 79°21′03″W	Buena Vista	Now houses middle school and school offices
5	Old Courthouse	Old Courthouse	May 25, 1979 (#79003297)	2110 Magnolia Ave. 37°44′04″N 79°21′14″W	Buena Vista	
6	W.N. Seay House	W.N. Seay House	August 16, 2007 (#07000826)	245 W. 26th St. 37°44′29″N 79°21′12″W	Buena Vista	
7	Southern Seminary Main Building	Southern Seminary Main Building	April 13, 1972 (#72001501)	Junction of Ivy and Park Aves. 37°44′25″N 79°21′01″W	Buena Vista	

== See also ==
- List of National Historic Landmarks in Virginia
- National Register of Historic Places listings in Virginia
- National Register of Historic Places listings in Rockbridge County, Virginia
