= Colored High School =

Colored High School may refer to various segregated African American secondary schools:

== Alabama ==
- Bessemer Colored High School in Bessemer, Alabama; it became Dunbar High School (Bessemer, Alabama) and is NRHP-listed
- Colored High School in Decatur, Alabama
- Colored High School in Huntsville, Alabama, also known as Huntersville Colored High School
- Colored High School in Tuscaloosa, Alabama

== Arkansas ==
- Marion Colored High School in Sunset, Arkansas; also known as the Phelix School, NRHP–listed
- Okolona Colored High School and the Okolona Colored High School Gymnasium in Okolona, Arkansas; NRHP–listed

== Arizona ==
- Phoenix Union Colored High School in Phoenix, Arizona; which became Carver High School

== Florida ==
- Colored High School in Fernandina, Florida
- Colored High School in Green Cove, Florida
- Pompano Colored School in Pompano Beach, Florida

== Georgia ==
- Colored High School in Elberton, Georgia
- Colored High School in Moultrie, Georgia
- Colored High School in Rome, Georgia

== Illinois ==
- Colored High School in DuQuoin, Illinois, also known as DuQuoin Lincoln High School

== Kentucky ==
- Colored High School in Richmond, Kentucky
- State Normal School for Colored Persons, Frankfort, Kentucky; now Kentucky State University

== Louisiana ==
- Arcadia Colored High School in Arcadia, Louisiana; NRHP listed
- Gibsland Colored High School in Gibsland, Louisiana
- Houma Colored High School in Houma, Louisiana
- New Iberia Colored High School (later known as Jonas Henderson High School) in New Iberia, Louisiana

== Maryland ==
- Colored High School in Baltimore, Maryland
- Havre de Grace Colored High School in Havre de Grace, Maryland
- Marlboro Colored High School in Upper Marlboro, Maryland

== Mississippi ==
- Colored High School in Port Gibson, Mississippi
- Cleveland Colored Consolidated High School (also known as East Side High School) in Cleveland, Mississippi
- Union Academy (Columbus, Mississippi) in Columbus, Mississippi

== North Carolina ==
- Farmville Colored School (also known as H. B. Sugg High School) in Farmville, North Carolina
- Snow Hill Colored High School in Snow Hill, North Carolina

== South Carolina ==
- Liberty Colored High School in Liberty, South Carolina

== Texas ==
- Dallas Colored High School (later known as Booker T. Washington High School for the Performing and Visual Arts) in Dallas, Texas
- Mineola Colored High School (also known as Addie E. McFarland High School) in Mineola, Texas

== Virginia ==
- Richmond Colored High School in Richmond, Virginia; which became Armstrong High School (Virginia)

== See also ==
- Colored
- Colored school (disambiguation)
- State Colored Normal School (disambiguation)
- Historically black colleges and universities
- Sam Houston Industrial and Training School near Huntsville, Texas
