= Josephine Pearson =

American anti-suffragette, educator, writer, and lecturer (1868–1944)

Josephine Anderson Pearson
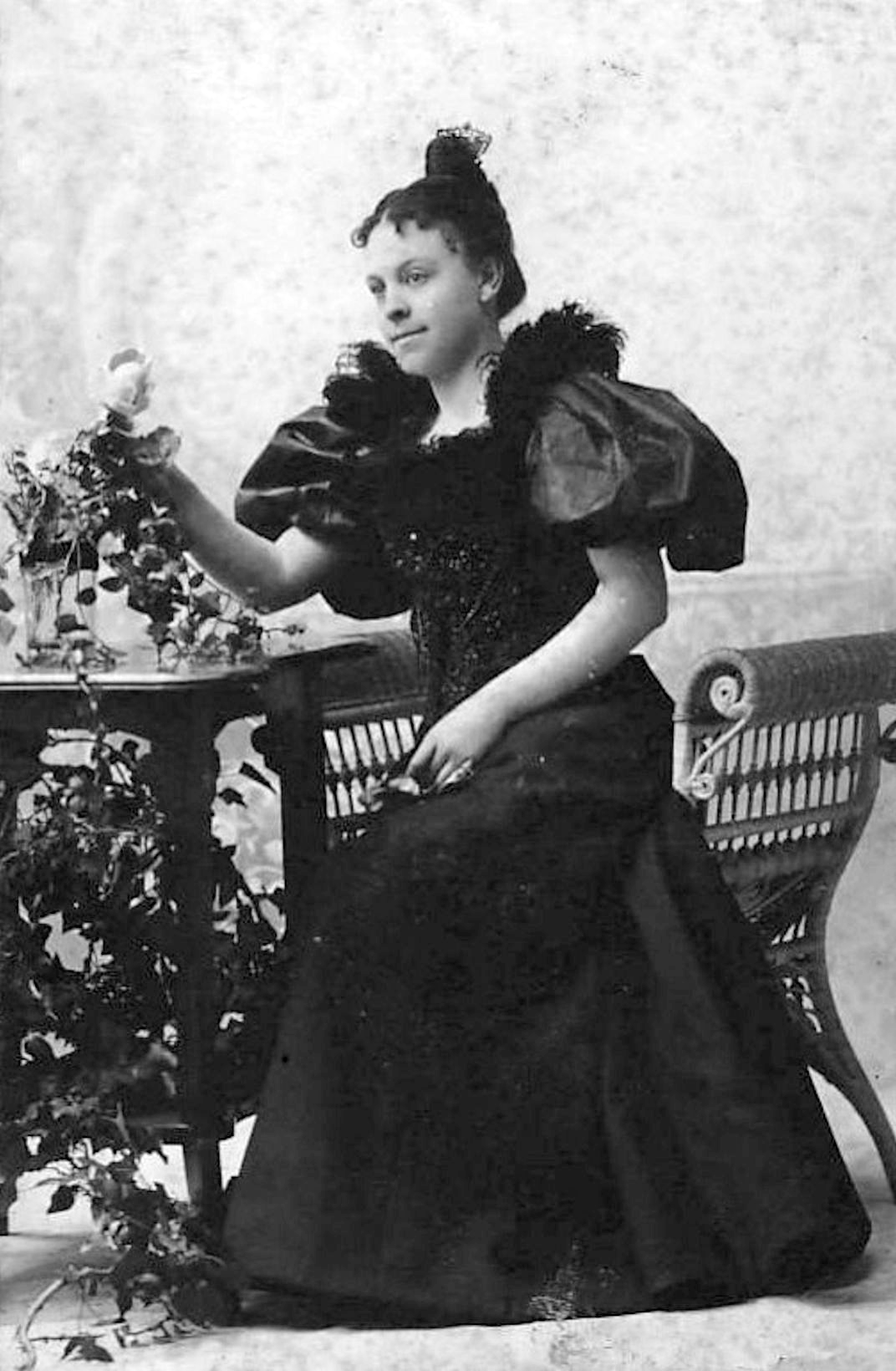
- A young Josephine Anderson Pearson.
- Born: Josephine Anderson Pearson; June 30, 1868; Gallatin, Tennessee, U.S.
- Died: November 3, 1944 (aged 76); Monteagle, Tennessee, U.S.
- Resting place: Monteagle Cemetery
- Education: Irving College (B.A.); Cumberland University (M.A.)
- Occupations: Educator, writer, lecturer, anti-suffragist
- Organization(s): Tennessee State Association Opposed to Woman Suffrage (President); Southern Woman's League for the Rejection of the Susan B. Anthony Amendment
- Known for: Anti-suffrage activism in Tennessee
- Parent(s): Rev. Philip A. Pearson (father); Amanda Roscoe Pearson (mother)
- Relatives: Mrs. B. J. Wells (cousin); Miss Floy Howard (cousin); Mrs. Robert Morehead (cousin); Mrs. Alfred Davis (cousin); Mrs. John McKoin (cousin)

Josephine Anderson Pearson (June 30, 1868 – November 3, 1944) was an American educator, writer, lecturer, and anti-suffragist. She is best known for her leadership in the movement opposing women's suffrage in Tennessee during the ratification of the Nineteenth Amendment to the United States Constitution.

== Life and education ==
Pearson was born on June 30, 1868, in Gallatin, Tennessee, to Rev. Philip A. Pearson and Amanda Roscoe Pearson. She grew up in McMinnville, Tennessee, where she received her early education. Pearson graduated with a Bachelor of Arts degree from Irving College in McMinnville in 1890. She furthered her education by obtaining a Master of Arts degree from Cumberland College (now Cumberland University) in Lebanon, Tennessee, in 1896. She also pursued additional studies at Vanderbilt University and the University of Missouri.

Pearson worked for many organizations and held positions such as the women's auxiliary president for the Dixie Highway Council of the Cumberland Divide and commissioner for the Woman's Board of the Tennessee Centennial Exposition.

== Academic career ==
Following her studies, she served as Principal of the High School in McMinnville from 1890 to 1894, and later as Principal of the Nashville College for Young Ladies from 1895 to 1897.

In 1897, Pearson accepted the Chair of English at Winthrop State Normal College for Women in Rock Hill, South Carolina, where she worked until 1899. From 1901 to 1908, she held an executive position in the Woman's Congress at the Monteagle Assembly (Chautauqua) and simultaneously served as Chair of History and English at the Higbee School in Memphis, Tennessee.

From 1909 to 1914, Pearson served as the Dean and held the Chair of Philosophy at Christian College, which was affiliated with the University of Missouri in Columbia, Missouri.

After the suffrage movement, she continued her academic career, serving as Dean and Chair of Philosophy and History at Southern Seminary in Buena Vista, Virginia, from 1917 to 1922.

In 1923, Pearson organized the course of study for novices at the Anglican Convent in Fond du Lac, Wisconsin. She later held the positions of Dean and Chair of Philosophy and History at March College in Staunton, Virginia, from 1931 to 1932. During this period, she also taught English and Philosophy at St. Agnes College for Women and the Memphis Conservatory of Music in Memphis, Tennessee.

== Anti-Suffrage advocacy ==
Pearson became a leading figure in the anti-suffrage movement in Tennessee after promising her dying mother to continue opposing women's suffrage. She fought for women's rights by writing essays on feminism, suffrage, and related topics. Despite being a well-educated and independent woman herself, Pearson took on a prominent role as president of the Tennessee State Association Opposed to Woman Suffrage in 1917.

Pearson and other antis feared that women's suffrage would disrupt traditional gender roles and potentially enfranchise Black voters, which they believed would threaten white supremacy.

Although at this time she lived in Monteagle with her father, she traveled throughout Tennessee for three years working for the association. In mid-July 1920, Pearson traveled to Nashville, Tennessee, due to a special session being called by the governor to vote on the 19th amendment. During her fight for the 19th amendment, Pearson set up headquarters at the Hermitage Hotel in Nashville, where she urged legislators to oppose ratification. The ratification of the 19th Amendment, which ultimately granted women the right to vote in 1920.

In 1920, she became the president of the Southern Woman’s League for Rejection of the Susan B. Anthony Amendment.

== Later life ==
Although Pearson never cast a vote in her lifetime, she spent the remainder of her life writing, teaching, and protesting women’s suffrage. Pearson continued to lecture across the Southern United States and authored numerous articles and books until her death on November 3, 1944.

She was laid to rest in Monteagle Cemetery.
