= Lafayette Elementary School =

Lafayette Elementary School may refer to:

- Lafayette Elementary School (Lafayette, Louisiana), NRHP-listed
- Lafayette Elementary School (Washington, D.C.), NRHP-listed in western D.C.
- Lafayette Elementary School, in Lafayette, California
- Lafayette Elementary School, in Lafayette, Tennessee
- Lafayette Elementary School, in West Seattle, Washington
- Lafayette Elementary School, in the Lincoln Park Public Schools (Michigan) district
- Lafayette Elementary School, in the Wayne Public Schools district in New Jersey
- Lafayette Elementary School, in the Bound Brook School District in New Jersey
- Lafayette Elementary School, in the Greater Albany Public School District in Oregon
