= Corey Raymond =

American football player and coach (born 1969)

Current position
- Title: Defensive backs coach
- Team: LSU
- Conference: SEC

Biographical details
- Born: September 28, 1969 (age 57); New Iberia, Louisiana, U.S.

Playing career
- 1987–1991: LSU
- 1992–1994: New York Giants
- 1995: Jacksonville Jaguars*
- 1995–1997: Detroit Lions
- 1999: San Diego Chargers*
- Position: Cornerback

Coaching career (HC unless noted)
- 2003: New Iberia Senior HS (LA) (DB)
- 2004–2005: Westgate HS (LA) (DC/S&C)
- 2006: LSU (Intern)
- 2007–2008: LSU (Asst S&C)
- 2009–2010: Utah State (CB)
- 2011: Nebraska (DB)
- 2012–2017: LSU (DB/AHC)
- 2017–2019: LSU (CB)
- 2020–2021: LSU (CB/RC)
- 2022: Florida (AHC/CB)
- 2023: Florida (AHC/DB)
- 2024-present: LSU (CB)

Accomplishments and honors

Championships
- CFP National Champion (2020)

Corey Raymond (born September 28, 1969) is an American football coach, and former player. He is currently the Defensive Backs coach at LSU.

== Playing career ==
Raymond played cornerback at LSU before being signed by the New York Giants as an undrafted free agent in 1992. Raymond also played for the Detroit Lions.

== Coaching career ==
Raymond began his coaching career in 2003 at his alma mater, New Iberia High School in New Iberia, Louisiana. He then moved to Westgate High School in Iberia Parish, Louisiana from 2004 to 2005.

Starting in 2006, Raymond moved to the college coaching ranks. He interned at his college alma mater, LSU. From 2007 to 2008, he was the assistant strength and conditioning coach at LSU. From 2009 to 2010, Raymond was the cornerbacks coach at Utah State. He was also the defensive backs coach for the Indiana Hoosiers during winter 2011, but did not coach during the regular season at Indiana. Raymond then became the Nebraska Cornhuskers secondary coach for the 2011 season.

In 2012, Raymond returned to LSU as the defensive backs coach and assistant head coach. In 2017, Raymond became cornerbacks coach with Bill Busch taking over as safeties coach. In 2020, Raymond received the additional title of recruiting coordinator at LSU.

He was announced as a part of Billy Napier’s Florida staff for 2022.

Florida parted ways with Raymond in November 2023. He was officially hired by LSU on January 16, 2024.
