= New Iberia Senior High School =

Location
- 1301 East Admiral Doyle Drive; New Iberia, Iberia Parish, Louisiana 70560; United States; 29.9832°N 91.8115°W

Information
- Type: Public, coeducational
- Status: Open
- School board: Iberia Parish School Board
- NCES District ID: 2200720
- Superintendent: Carey Laviolette
- NCES School ID: 220072000527
- Principal: Curt Landry
- Grades: 9–12
- Enrollment: 1,373 (2023-2024)
- Campus type: Suburb
- Colors: Black and gold
- Athletics conference: LHSAA
- Mascot: Yellow Jackets
- Team name: Yellowjackets and Lady Jackets
- Feeder schools: Belle Place Middle School (unincorporated New Iberia); Iberia Middle School (New Iberia)
- Graduates: 89%
- Website: nish.iberiaschools.org

New Iberia Senior High School (NISH) is a public senior high school located at 1301 E. Admiral Doyle Drive in New Iberia, Louisiana, United States. It is in the Iberia Parish School System. It serves New Iberia and Avery Island.

== About ==
In 2022, the demographics for the student body was 49.1% White, 39.5% African-American, 6.5% Hispanic, 2.4% Asian, and 2% two or more races. The school is Title 1 eligible.

== History ==
From 1966 to 1990, New Iberia High School (1926 building) was located in a different building at 415 Center Street in New Iberia.

African-American students were segregated from white schools until the passage of a series of law changes starting with Brown v. Board of Education (1954). Prior to racial integration in New Iberia schools in September 1969, African American students attended the public Jonas Henderson High School; and at the earlier private Baptist Howe Institute (Louisiana) in operation from 1890 to 1933.

In 1992, New Iberia High School teacher Toby Daspit with Pat Kahle, and Jamie Credle taught the class "Oral Traditions of the African American Community in Iberia Parish", a class to prepare a future generation of oral historians. The oral traditions class idea originated with the Iberia Parish School System and Carmelite Blanco.

In November 2022, the school had a bullying incident that was shared on social media and made the news. In December 2022, the school had an issue with a gun on campus. That same month, the school's gym was repurposed as a temporary shelter following the 2022 New Iberia tornado after the Iberia Medical Center took a direct hit.

== Athletics ==
New Iberia Senior High athletics competes in the LHSAA.

List of sports:

- M Baseball
- M/W Basketball
- Cheerleading
- M/W Cross Country
- Dance Team
- M Football
- M/W Golf
- M/W Gymnastics
- M/W Powerlifting
- M/W Soccer
- W Softball
- M/W Swim Team
- M/W Tennis
- M/W Athletics
- W Volleyball

== Notable alumni ==
- Johnny Hector (born 1960) — former NFL football player for the NY Jets
- Kerry Joseph (born 1973) - former NFL football player for the Seattle Seahawks
- Bryan Lourd (born 1960) — film and television talent agent
- Corey Raymond (born 1969) — football coach and former NFL football player for the NY Jets
- Kendel Shello (born 1973) — former NFL football player for the Indianapolis Colts

== See also ==
- New Iberia High School (1926 building)
