= Colored school =

Colored school is a term that has been historically used in the United States during the Jim Crow-era to refer to a segregated African American school or black school (which could be at any school type or level). It has also been used as a term used to describe historically black colleges and universities (HBCU).

Establishments called colored schools include:

- Abbeville Colored School in Abbeville, Mississippi; NRHP-listed
- Alapaha Colored School in Alapaha, Georgia; NRHP–listed
- Ashburn Colored School in Ashburn, Virginia
- Avondale Colored School in Scottdale, Georgia; later known as Hamilton High School
- Bellevue Avenue Colored School in Trenton, New Jersey; NRHP–listed
- Brooklyn Colored School in Brooklyn (now Oakland), Alameda County, California
- Buena Vista Colored School in Buena Vista, Virginia; NRHP–listed
- Calhoun Colored School in Calhoun, Alabama
- Coinjock Colored School in Coinjock, North Carolina; NRHP–listed
- Colored School No. 3 in New York City
- DeLeon Springs Colored School in DeLeon, Florida; NRHP-listed
- Douglass Colored School in Lawton, Oklahoma; NRHP-listed
- Hampton Colored School in Hampton, South Carolina
- Homer College, also known as Homer Colored College in Homer, Louisiana
- Hiram Colored School in Hiram, Georgia; NRHP–listed
- Jarvisburg Colored School in Jarvisburg, North Carolina
- Laurel Grove Colored School and Church in Franconia, Virginia
- Magnolia Colored School Historic District in Magnolia, Arkansas
- Millwood Colored School in Boyce, Virginia; now Millwood Community Center
- Opelousas Colored School in Opelousas, Louisiana
- Pine Grove Colored School in St. Andrews, South Carolina; later Pine Grove Rosenwald School; NRHP-listed
- Richmond City Colored School for African-American Children in Richmond, Kentucky; later known as Richmond High School
- Rock Hill Colored School in Frisco, Texas
- San Francisco Colored School in San Francisco, California
- Sanibel Colored School in Sanibel, Florida; NRHP–listed
- Seventh Street Colored School in Covington, Kentucky; later known as William Grant High School
- Simmons Colored School in St. Louis, Missouri
- Smithville Colored School in Colesville, Maryland
- State Colored Normal School (disambiguation)
- Victoria Colored School in Victoria County, Texas
- Virginia Avenue Colored School in Louisville, Kentucky; NRHP–listed
- Virginia Industrial Home School for Colored Girls in Mechanicsville, Virginia; later known as Barrett Juvenile Correctional Center
- Walnut Cove Colored School in Walnut Cove, North Carolina; also known as London School
- Weston Colored School in Weston, West Virginia; also known as the Central West Virginia Genealogical & Historical Library and Museum and Frontier School
- Williamston Colored School in Williamston, North Carolina

== See also ==
- Colored, a racial descriptor historically used in the United States
- Colored High School

=== Schools with related names ===
- Colored Music Settlement School
- Colored Memorial School and Risley High School
- Halltown Colored Free School
- Normal School for Colored Girls
