= Equalization school =

Equalization schools were schools established in the southern United States before and after the U.S. Supreme Court's Brown v. Board of Education decision. Following the separate but equal mandate from U.S. courts they were created in an effort to stave off integration.

South Carolina invested in equalization schools. Georgia also had equalization schools.

Lawsuits in Virginia challenged segregation and discrimination in education. Equalization programs attempted to meet the challenge.

After desegregation many of the schools were closed. High schools became junior highs or elementary schools. Many faculty lost their jobs.

The Battle Fund in Virginia funded construction of new schools for African American students. In some other southern states the statewide sales tax revenues were used. Georgia has a Minimum Foundation Program that used sales tax revenues.

The Mims v. The Duval County School Board federal court decision in 1971 desegregated schools in Duval County, Florida.

Florida's State Historic Preservation Office has a Multiple Property Submission for Florida’s Historic Black Public Schools.

== Equalization schools ==
=== Alabama ===
- Academy Street High School in Troy, Alabama (Pike County)
- Ada Hanna Elementary School in Hamilton, Alabama (Marion County)
- East Highland High School in Sylacauga, Alabama (Talladega County)
- Mack M. Mathews Elementary School in Pinckard, Alabama (Dale County)
- South Girard High School in Phenix City, Alabama (Russell County)
- W. B. Doby High School in Wetumpka, Alabama (Elmore County)

=== Other schools ===
- William M. Raines High School in Jacksonville, Florida
- Lanier High School in Jackson, Mississippi

== See also ==
- Training school (United States)
- Colored school
- List of industrial schools
