= Gordon Hotel =

- U.S. National Register of Historic Places
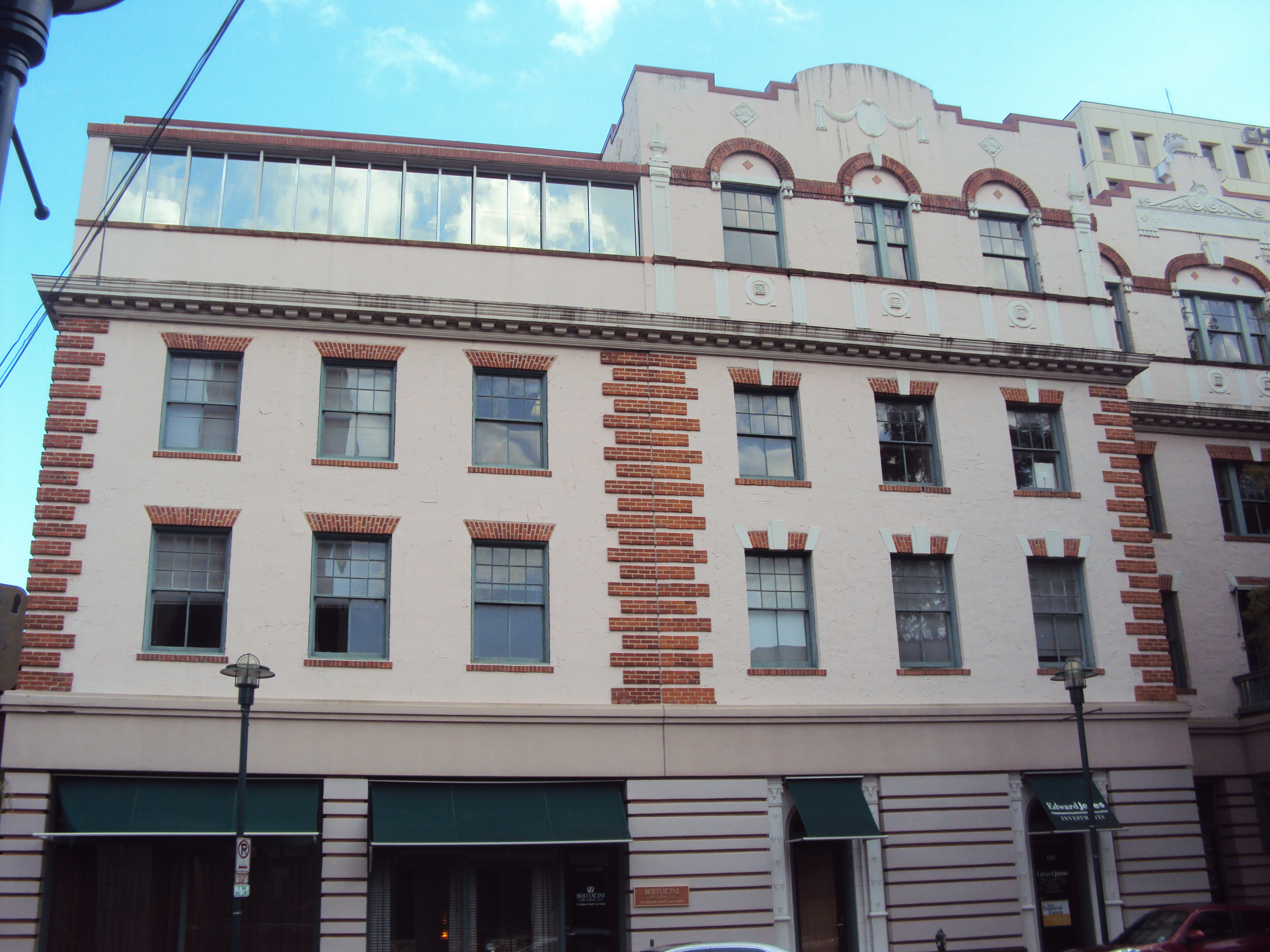

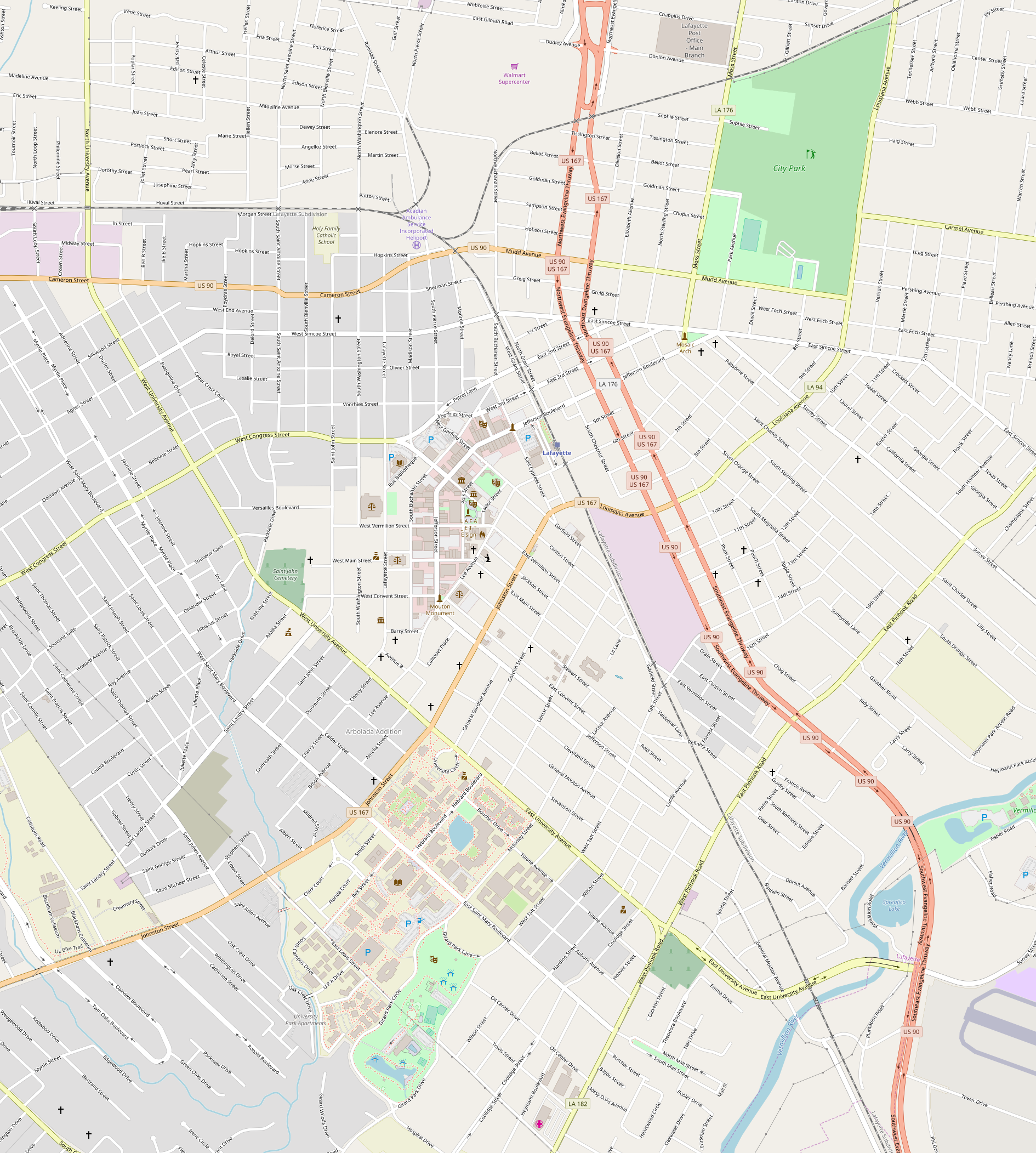
- Location within Lafayette
- Location: 100-110 East Vermilion Street, Lafayette, Louisiana
- Coordinates: 30°13′26″N 92°01′07″W
- Area: 0.4 acres (0.16 ha)
- Built: 1904
- Built by: George Knapp
- Architect: Favrot and Livaudais; William T. Nolan
- Architectural style: Renaissance Revival
- NRHP reference No.: 82002778
- Added to NRHP: June 25, 1982

The Gordon Hotel is a historic hotel building located at 100-110 East Vermilion Street in Lafayette, Louisiana, United States.

Originally built in 1904 by George Knapp and designed by Favrot and Livaudais, the hotel was a three-story brick and stucco building in Renaissance Revival style. An extensive remodeling happened in 1928, with William T. Nolan supervision, which added a fourth Baroque styled story to the building, including an undulated roof and a corner obelisk. The 1928 remodeling also added a three-story addition to the east side of the building.

The building was listed on the National Register of Historic Places on June 25, 1982.

== See also ==
- National Register of Historic Places listings in Lafayette Parish, Louisiana
