= Simmons Colored School =

Black school in St. Louis, Missouri, US

- U.S. National Register of Historic Places
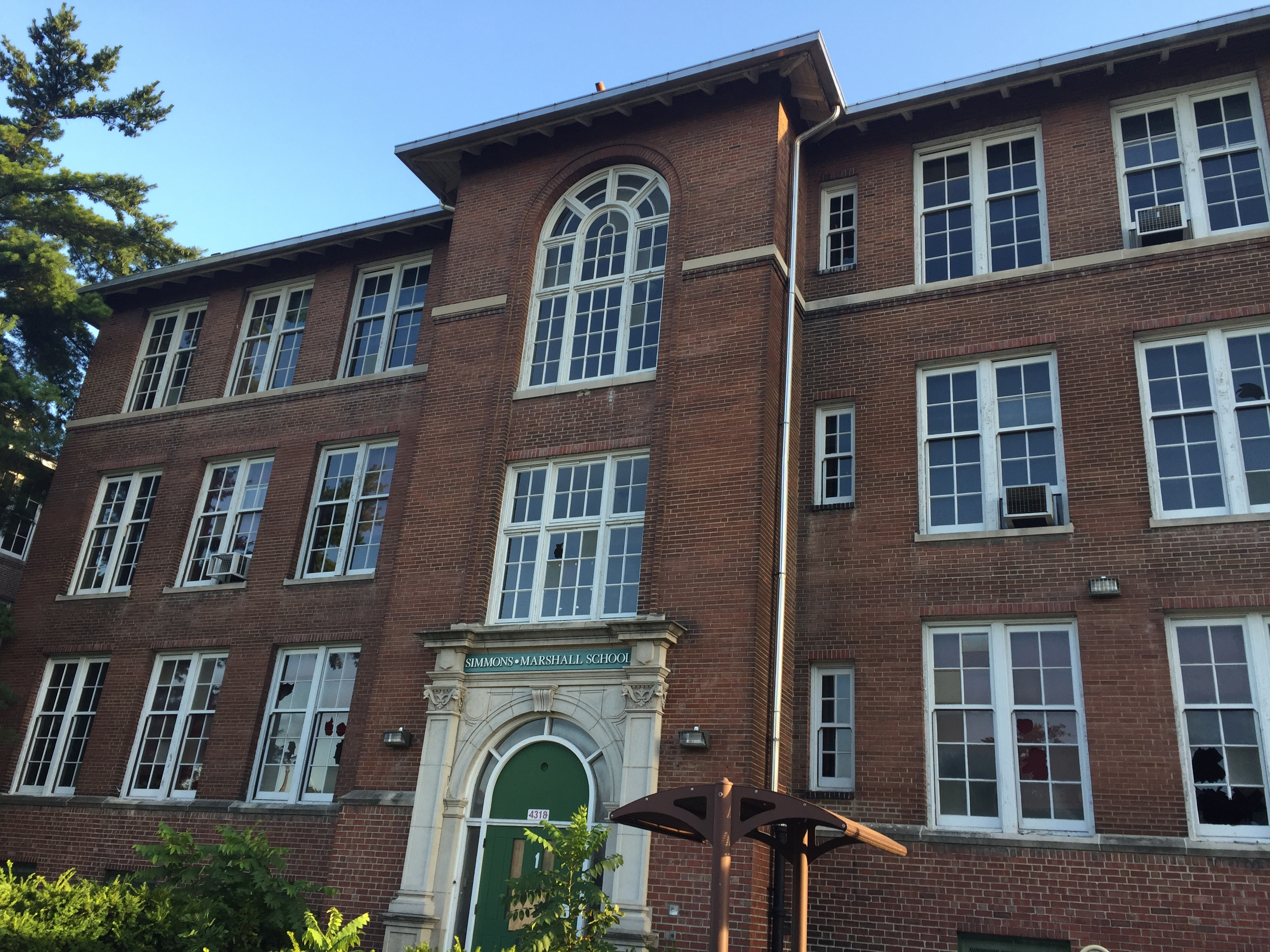
- Location: 4306–4318 St. Louis Avenue, St. Louis, Missouri, U.S.
- Coordinates: 38°39′54″N 90°14′15″W
- Area: 2.4 acres (0.97 ha)
- Built: 1898
- Architect: William Butts Ittner
- Architectural style: Classical Revival
- MPS: The Ville, St. Louis, Missouri MPS
- NRHP reference No.: 99001163
- Added to NRHP: September 17, 1999

Simmons Colored School is a historic building and a former African American school in The Ville neighborhood of St. Louis, Missouri, U.S.. It served as a historically segregated African American elementary school and middle school from 1898 until 1930. The building served as the Stowe Teachers College campus, an African American normal school and junior college from 1930 until 1940. The building has played an important role in The Ville community since its inception. The school was also known as Elleardsville School for Colored Children No. 8, Colored School #8, Simmons Middle School, and Simmons School.

The Simmons Colored School has been listed on the National Register of Historic Places since 1999, for the architecture and contributions to Black history.

== History ==
=== 19th-century ===
In 1873, the Elleardsville School for Colored Children No. 8 (shortened as Colored School #8) was opened in a two room frame building on the site of the present Simmons Middle School. The school began with only White teachers; and by 1877, Black teachers had replaced them and had begun serving in administrative positions in the school as well.

The Classical Revival style school building was designed by nationally-known St. Louis architect William Butts Ittner during the first full year of his tenure as the first Commissioner of St. Louis School Buildings.

In 1891, the school was renamed for William J. Simmons (1849–1890) shortly after his death, a Black Baptist clergyman, educator, and author who was formerly enslaved. The need for a more adequate facility was finally addressed when the first part of the present Simmons School building was designed in 1898, during this time most students (including neighboring White students) did not finish schooling past the 8th grade.

=== 20th-century ===
Architect Ittner designed the school to be two-stories high with a removable wooden roof to facilitate the addition of another five-room story. When the school building opened in 1898, the enrollment was 50 students. By 1900, the enrollment was 492 students. With a great increase in demand, that third story was added in 1901. The school enrollment continued to increase quickly, and Ittner found it necessary to address the inadequacy of the facilities in 1911, when he designed the three-story companion wing to Simmons School. The crowding problem was somewhat alleviated in 1918 when the nearby all-White Marshall School (or John Marshall Elementary School) became an African American middle school.

The demand for Black teachers for the Black schools increased, and the local Black teachers' training facilities became inadequate. The Normal School located at Sumner High School outgrew its space and moved to Simmons in 1930, where it was renamed Stowe Teachers College, after Harriet Beecher Stowe. An addition was designed in 1929 and built at the west end of the 1911 wing at a cost of US $50,000; the records do not include the architect's name, but it was almost certainly Rockwell M. Milligan, the school board architect in 1929. In 1933, Lincoln University in Jefferson City, Missouri established a junior college division at Stowe Teachers College, funded under the Public Works Administration (PWA). Although the Lincoln University junior college program lasted only a few years, Stowe received its own junior college standing in the fall semester of 1938. The St. Louis Argus newspaper had a regular news column dedicated to the school updates. In the mid-1930s, of the 21 accredited institutions of higher learning located in St. Louis, only Stowe Teachers College and the Homer G. Phillips School of Nursing admitted African Americans. In 1940, the Stowe Teachers College moved to a new building a few blocks away, eventually becoming the Harris–Stowe State College (now Harris–Stowe State University).

=== 21st-century ===
In 2022, new apartments were proposed for the former school building.

== See also ==
- Colored school
- National Register of Historic Places listings in St. Louis north and west of downtown
