= Delcambre High School =

Location
- 601 W Main St. Delcambre, Louisiana 70528; United States
- 29.9476°N 91.9931°W

Information
- School district: Iberia Parish School System
- NCES School ID: 220072000511
- Principal: Chantel Helms
- Faculty: 38.65 (FTE)
- Grades: 6–12
- Gender: Coeducational
- Enrollment: 493 (2023–2024)
- Student to teacher ratio: 12.76
- Colors: Black and orange
- Mascot: Panther
- Nickname: Panthers
- Yearbook: Le Delcambre
- Website: dhs.iberiaschools.org

Delcambre High School is a grade 6–12 middle and high school in Delcambre, Vermilion Parish, Louisiana, United States. Despite its location in Vermillion Parish it is in the Iberia Parish School System. It is located at 601 W Main St. Delcambre, LA 70528.

The Vermilion Parish School Board pays money to the Iberia parish district to educate Delcambre students in Vermilion Parish. In 2000 the Iberia Parish district signed an inter-district agreement with the Vermilion Parish district over those payments. Another such agreement was signed in 2022.

== Athletics ==
Delcambre High athletics competes in the LHSAA.

== Notable Alumni ==
Hagan Landry - Paralympic athlete and college coach
