= New Iberia High School (1926 building) =

- U.S. National Register of Historic Places

- Location within Louisiana Location within the United States
- Location: 415 Center Street, New Iberia, Louisiana
- Coordinates: 29°59′59″N 91°49′11″W
- Area: 3.01 acres (1.22 ha)
- Built: 1926
- Architect: William T. Nolan
- Architectural style: Classical Revival
- NRHP reference No.: 94000236
- Added to NRHP: March 17, 1994

The New Iberia High School building, now the School Days Apartments, is a former school house for New Iberia Senior High School and historic structure located at 415 Center Street in New Iberia, Louisiana. The building was listed on the National Register of Historic Places on March 17, 1994.

== History ==
It is a large Classical Revival building, three stories in height, built out of brick and stone. It was built in 1926 and enlarged in 1939 to a design by William T. Nolan, and is the parish's only example of Classical Revival design. It served as a high school until 1966, and as a middle school thereafter until 1990.

The building has since been converted to housing for senior citizens as the "School Days Apartments".

== See also ==
- National Register of Historic Places listings in Iberia Parish, Louisiana
