= Masonic Hall (Long Beach, Mississippi) =

Building in Mississippi

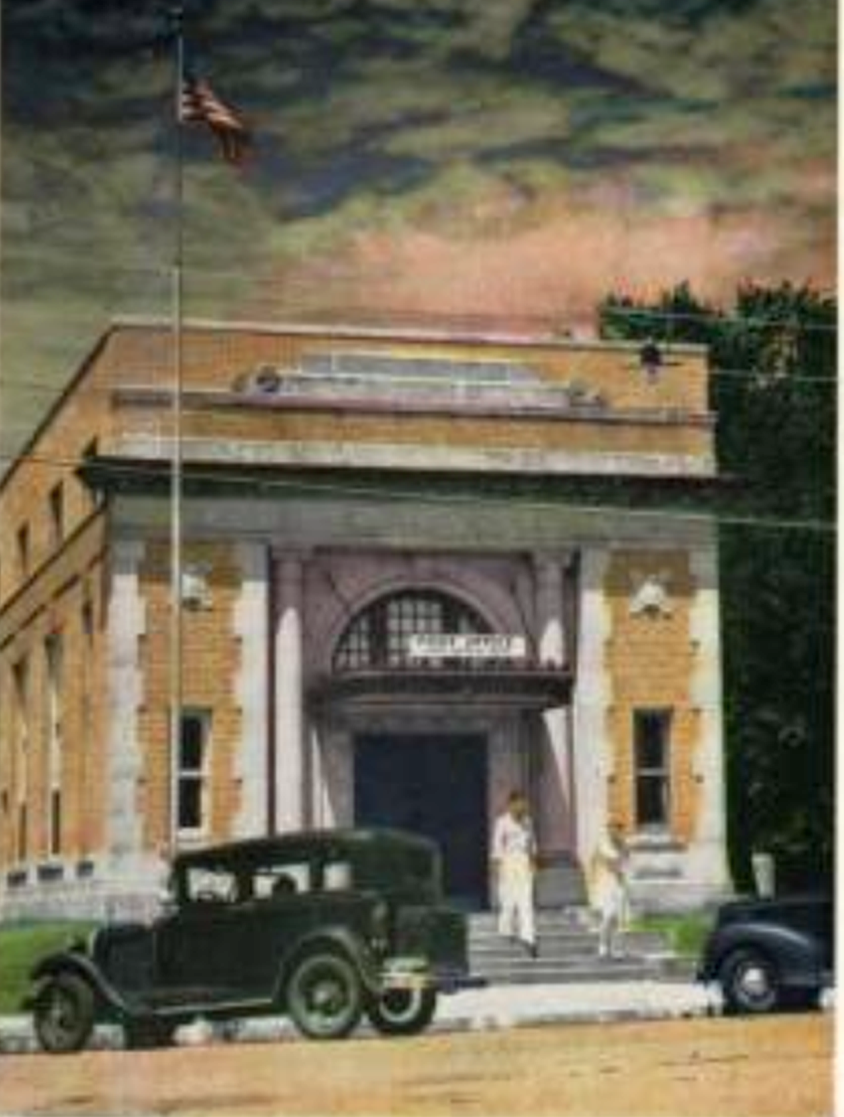
- Building used as Post Office, c. 1940s

- Location within Mississippi
- 30°20′57.76″N 89°9′3.48″W
- Location: 126 Jeff Davis Avenue, Long Beach, Mississippi

Mississippi Landmark
- Official name: (former) Hancock Bank [Former Masonic Hall (Southern Star Lodge No. 500, F&AM)]
- Designated: July 25, 2008
- Reference no.: 047-LNG-0007-ML

The Masonic Hall in Long Beach, Mississippi, also the former home of Southern Star Lodge No. 500, F&AM and the Hancock County Bank Building, is a historic building that was designated a Mississippi Landmark in 2008.

The building was built in approximately 1926 as the second branch of Hancock Bank. The building was designed by architect William T. Nolan. The bank catered to local red radish exporters. The area's red radishes became popular bar snacks in the northeastern United States and earned Long Beach the nickname as the "Radish Capital of the World." In 1931, the bank was robbed by three bandits, drawing press attention from as far away as The New York Times. The bank closed its Long Beach branch in the 1930s.

In 1942, the building was purchased by members of the Southern Star Lodge No. 500 Free and Accepted Masons. The Masonic lodge used the building's second floor as a meeting hall until 1960 (when it moved to a new location) and leased the first floor as post office. The building also was used for a time as Long Beach's public library.

In November 1998, the Long Beach Historical Society placed its first historical marker in front of the building, which was identified at the time as the oldest commercial building on the city's main street, Jeff Davis Avenue.

In the late 1990s, the renovated building reopened as a coffee and pastry shop known as "The Old Bank," with the old built-in safe still intact. In 2001, the shop was renamed "Bankhouse Coffee" and has been operated under that name since that time by Shawn Montella. The proprietors of the coffee shop also roast their own coffees in a 1906 Royal Roaster at the shop. The coffees roasted at the site are sold commercially under the brand name "Coast Roast."
