= State Normal School (disambiguation) =

A normal school is an institution created to train high school graduates to be teachers by educating them in the norms of pedagogy and curriculum.

State Normal School may also refer to:

- State Normal School (Athens, Georgia) in Athens, Georgia
- State Normal School at Cheney in Cheney, Washington
- Chico State Normal School in Chico, California
- State Normal School of Colorado in Greeley, Colorado
- State Normal School for Colored Persons in Frankfort, Kentucky
- Connecticut State Normal School in New Britain, Connecticut
- Duluth State Normal School in Duluth, Minnesota
- Durham State Normal School in Durham, North Carolina
- Eastern Illinois State Normal School in Charleston, Illinois
- Eastern Kentucky State Normal School in Richmond, Kentucky
- Edinboro State Normal School in Edinboro, Pennsylvania
- Iowa State Normal School in Cedar Falls, Iowa
- State Normal School at Los Angeles in Los Angeles, California
- Mansfield State Normal School in Mansfield, Pennsylvania
- State Normal School of Marshall College in Huntington, West Virginia
- Massachusetts State Normal School in Framingham, Massachusetts
- Michigan State Normal School in Ypsilanti, Michigan
- Northern Illinois State Normal School in DeKalb, Illinois
- State Normal School of Pennsylvania in Slippery Rock, Pennsylvania
- San Francisco State Normal School in San Francisco, California
- St. Cloud State Normal School in St. Cloud, Minnesota
- State Normal School at Valley City Historic District in Valley City, North America
- Washington State Normal School at Bellingham in Bellingham, Washington
- Washington State Normal School at Cheney Historic District in Cheney, Washington
- Western Kentucky State Normal School in Bowling Green, Kentucky
- State Normal School at Whatcom in Bellingham, Washington

== See also ==
- State Colored Normal School (disambiguation)
- State Normal and Industrial College (disambiguation)
