= Cedar Hill (Buena Vista, Virginia) =

Historic house in Virginia, United States

- U.S. National Register of Historic Places
- Virginia Landmarks Register
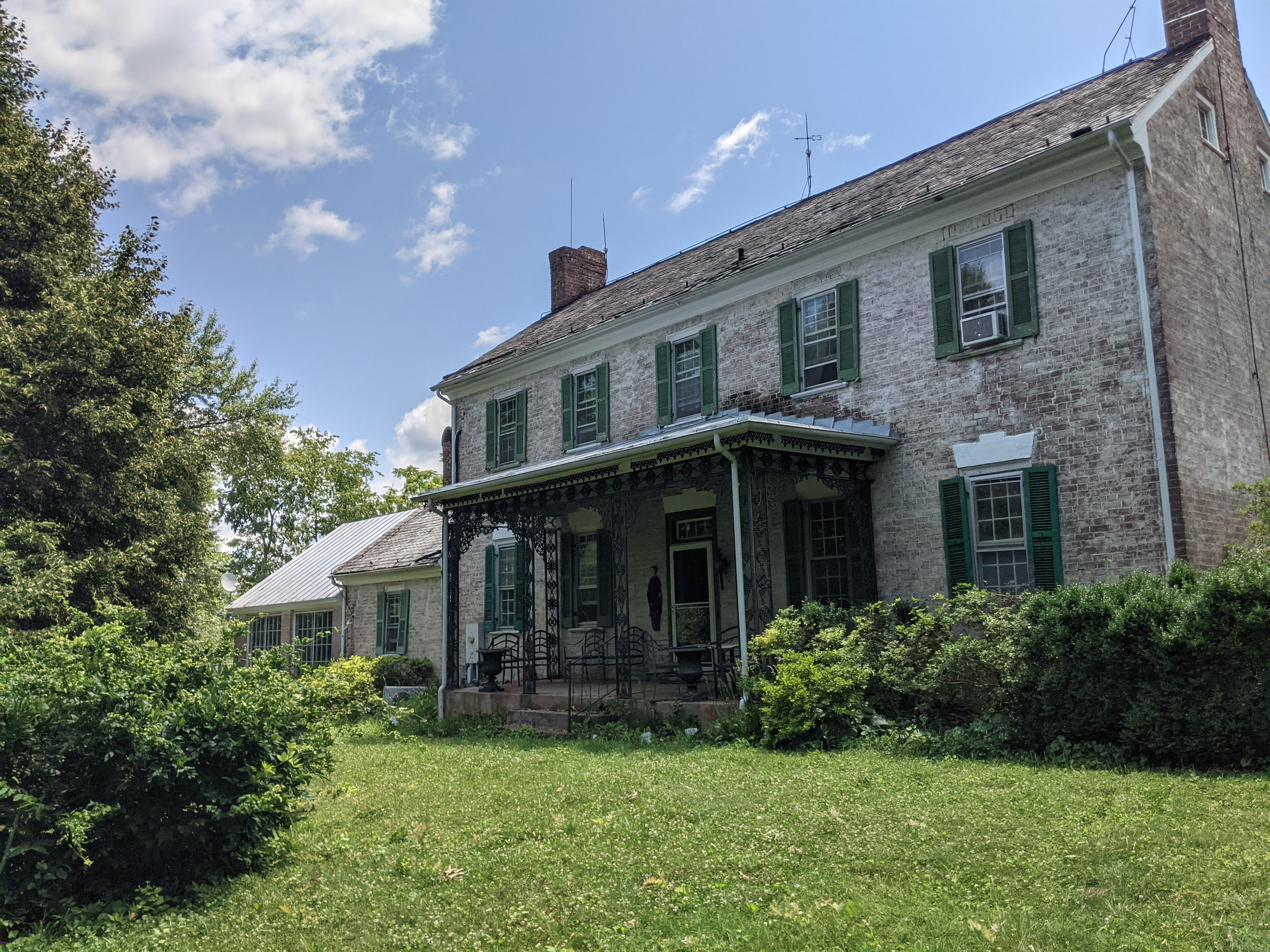
- View of the North side of Cedar Hill from the front lawn

- Location within Virginia Location within the United States
- Location: VA 608 E side, 2.25 mi. S of jct. with US 60, near Buena Vista, Virginia
- Coordinates: 37°43′04″N 79°23′52″W
- Area: 46.4 acres (18.8 ha)
- Built: 1821
- Architectural style: Federal
- NRHP reference No.: 94000726
- VLR No.: 081-0019

Significant dates
- Added to NRHP: July 15, 1994
- Designated VLR: April 20, 1994

Cedar Hill, also known as Cress Farm, is a historic home and farm located near Buena Vista, Rockbridge County, Virginia. The Federal style dwelling was built about 1821.

It was listed on the National Register of Historic Places in 1994.
