= State Colored Normal School =

A normal school is an institution created to train high school graduates to be teachers by educating them in the norms of pedagogy and curriculum. A "colored" school was a term that has been historically used in the United States during the Jim Crow-era to refer to a segregated African American school or Black school.

State Colored Normal School may refer to:

- State Colored Normal School, later known as Elizabeth City State University in Elizabeth City, North Carolina
- State Colored Normal School, later known as Fayetteville State University in Fayetteville, North Carolina

== Others ==
- State Normal School for Colored Persons, later known as Kentucky State University in Frankfort, Kentucky
- State Normal School and University for the Education of Colored Teachers and Students, later known as Lincoln Normal School in Marion, Alabama

== See also ==
- Colored school (disambiguation)
- Colored High School (disambiguation)
- State Normal School (disambiguation)
