= State Normal and Industrial College =

State Normal and Industrial College may refer to:

- State Normal and Industrial College, predecessor of University of North Carolina at Greensboro in North Carolina
- State Normal and Industrial College, predecessor of Florida A&M University in Tallahassee, Florida
- Normal and Industrial College, predecessor of Bowden College in Georgia

== See also ==
- State Normal School (disambiguation)
