= William T. Nolan =

Canadian-born architect who worked in New Orleans, Louisiana

William T. Nolan (1887–1969) was a Canadian-born architect who worked in New Orleans, Louisiana. His son Ulisse Nolan also became an architect.

He partnered with Peter Torre during 1910–21 in Nolan & Torre.

A number of his works are listed on the National Register of Historic Places.

Works include:

- Baton Rouge High School, 2825 Government St. Baton Rouge, LA (Nolan, William T.), NRHP-listed
- Central Fire Station, 427 Laurel St. Baton Rouge, LA (Nolan, William T.), NRHP-listed
- Dufrocq School, 330 S. 19th St. Baton Rouge, LA (Nolan, William T.), NRHP-listed
- Edwards Hotel, Capitol and Mill Sts. Jackson, MS (Nolan, William T.), NRHP-listed
- Gordon Hotel, 100–110 East Vermilion Street Lafayette, LA (Nolan, William T.), NRHP-listed
- Old Kenner High School, 1601 Rev. Richard Wilson Kenner, LA (Nolan, William T.), NRHP-listed
- Lafayette Elementary School, 1301 West University Avenue Lafayette, LA (Nolan, William T.), NRHP-listed
- Former Hancock Bank/ Former Masonic Hall / now Coffee Shop, 126 Jeff Davis Ave., Long Beach, Mississippi]], built c.1926.
- Moreauville High School, 287 Main St. Moreauville, LA (Nolan, William T.), NRHP-listed
- New Iberia High School, 415 Center St. New Iberia, LA (Nolan, William T.), NRHP-listed
- Nicholson School, 1143 North St. Baton Rouge, LA (Nolan, William T.), NRHP-listed
- Old Bay St. Louis High School/Old Second St. Elementary School, 400 Second St. No., Bay St. Louis, Mississippi
- Old Ocean Springs High School, Magnolia and Government St. Ocean Springs, MS (Nolan, William T.), NRHP-listed
