= Iberia Parish School System =

School district in Louisiana, United States

Iberia Parish School District

Address
- 1500 Jane Street New Iberia, Louisiana, 70563; United States
- Coordinates: 30.024816°N 91.823610°W

District information
- Type: Public (government funded)
- Grades: PK–12
- Superintendent: Heath Hulin
- Accreditation: Louisiana Department of Education
- Schools: 25 (2018–19)
- NCES District ID: 2200720

Students and staff
- Students: 12,555
- Teachers: 699.23 (FTE)
- Student–teacher ratio: 17.96 to 1

Other information
- Website: www.iberiaschools.org

The Iberia Parish School System is a school district headquartered in New Iberia, Louisiana, United States. The district serves all of Iberia Parish.

The city of Delcambre has portions located in Vermilion Parish, which is officially in the Vermilion Parish School District. However the Iberia Parish school district operates the public schools in Delcambre. The Vermilion Parish district pays money to the Iberia parish district to educate Delcambre students in Vermilion Parish. In 2000 the Iberia Parish district signed an inter-district agreement with the Vermilion Parish district over those payments. Another such agreement was signed in 2022.

== School uniforms ==
Beginning in the 2000–2001 school year all students in the system from pre-Kindergarten to the 12th Grade are required to wear school uniforms.

== Schools ==
=== 6–12 schools ===
- Delcambre High School (Delcambre, in Vermilion Parish)

=== 7–12 schools ===
- Loreauville High School (Loreauville)

=== 9–12 schools ===
- Jeanerette Senior High School (unincorporated area)
- New Iberia Senior High School (New Iberia)
- Westgate High School (unincorporated area)

=== 7–8 schools ===
- Anderson Middle School (New Iberia)
- Belle Place Middle School (unincorporated area)
- Iberia Middle School (unincorporated area)
- Jeanerette Middle School (Jeanerette)

=== K–6 schools ===
- Caneview Elementary School (New Iberia)
- Center Street Elementary School (New Iberia)
- Coteau Elementary School (unincorporated area)
- Daspit Elementary School (New Iberia)
- Dodson Elementary School (New Iberia)
- Hopkins Elementary School (New Iberia)
- Jeanerette Elementary School (Jeanerette)
- Johnston Elementary School (New Iberia)
- Loreauville Elementary School (Loreauville)
- North Lewis Elementary School (New Iberia)
- North Street Elementary School (New Iberia)
- Park Elementary School (New Iberia)
- Peebles Elementary School (unincorporated area)
- Pesson Elementary School (New Iberia)
- Sugarland Elementary School (unincorporated area)

=== 3–6 schools ===
- St. Charles Elementary School (Jeanerette)

=== Pre-K–5 schools ===
- Delcambre Elementary School (Delcambre, in Vermilion Parish)

=== K–2 schools ===
- Magnolia Elementary School (New Iberia)

=== Preschools ===
- Live Oak Preschool (New Iberia)

== Former schools ==
- Avery Island Elementary School (Avery Island, K–6 Unincorporated area) (closed 2008) - students were re-zoned to Center Street Elementary School
- Bank Avenue Elementary School (New Iberia, 5–6)
- Canal Elementary School (K–2, Jeanerette)
- Grand Marais Elementary School (K–2, unincorporated area)
- Lee Street Alternative School (alternative, New Iberia)
