= Glen Maury =

Historic house in Virginia, US

- U.S. National Register of Historic Places
- Virginia Landmarks Register
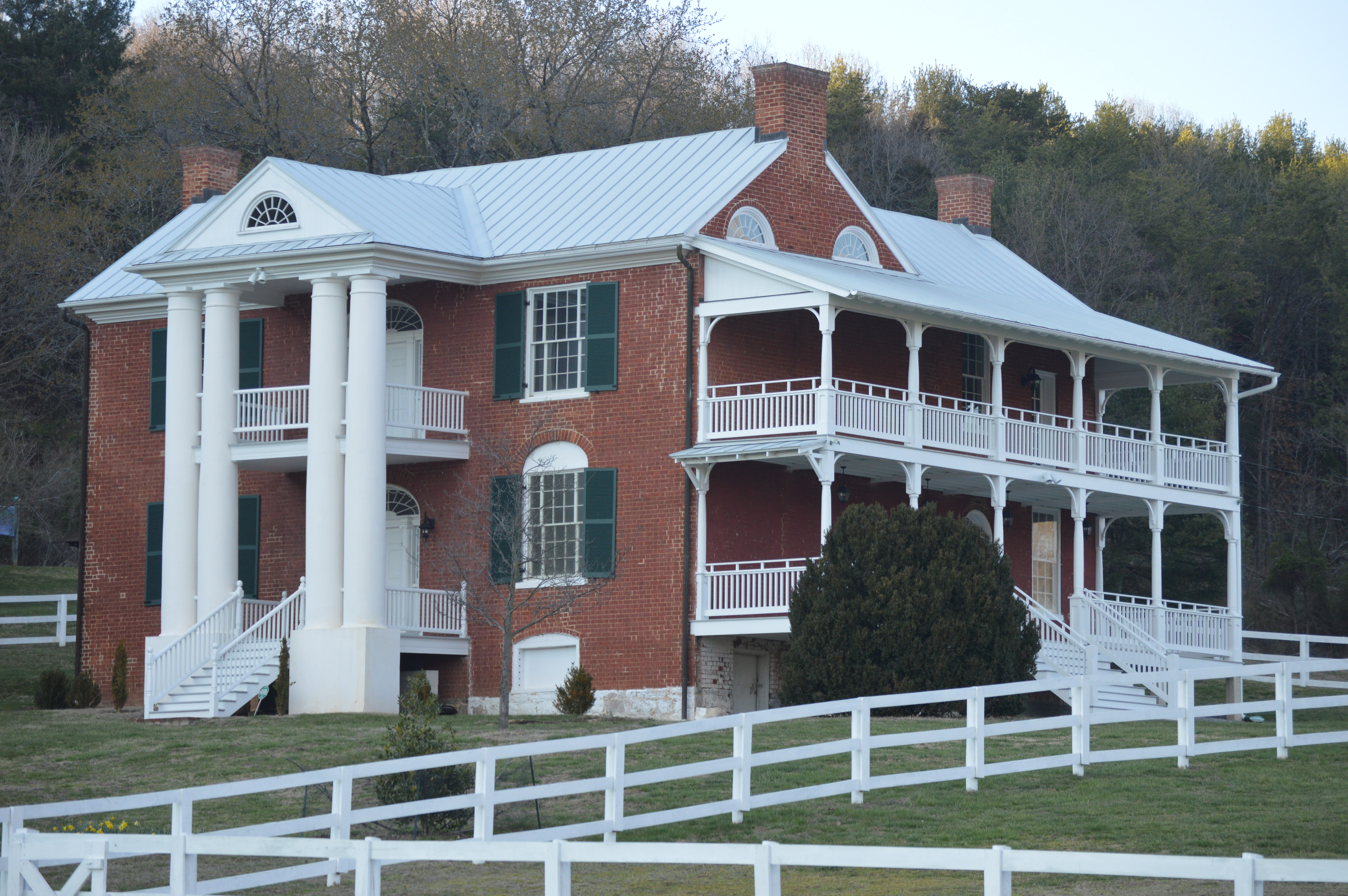
- Southwestern (left) and southeastern (right) sides

- Location within Virginia Location within the United States
- Location: West of Buena Vista, Virginia
- Coordinates: 37°43′48″N 79°21′46″W
- Area: 2 acres (0.81 ha)
- Built: c. 1832
- Built by: John Jordan, Samuel Darst
- Architectural style: Classical Revival
- NRHP reference No.: 79003078
- VLR No.: 103-0004

Significant dates
- Added to NRHP: May 24, 1979
- Designated VLR: May 16, 1978

Glen Maury, also known as the Paxton Place and Elisha Paxton's house, is a historic home located in Rockbridge County, Virginia, near the independent city of Buena Vista. It was built between 1829 and 1832, and is a 2 1/2-story, brick dwelling. It sits on a high basement, made of native stone, and has a two-story rear ell addition. The front facade features a somewhat crude, two-story, Doric order Classical Revival portico with paired columns. The river side is dominated by a five-bay, two-story verandah with turned wooden posts and simple brackets. It was added about 1900.

It was listed on the National Register of Historic Places in 1979.
