= W. N. Seay House =

Historic house in Virginia, United States

- U.S. National Register of Historic Places
- Virginia Landmarks Register
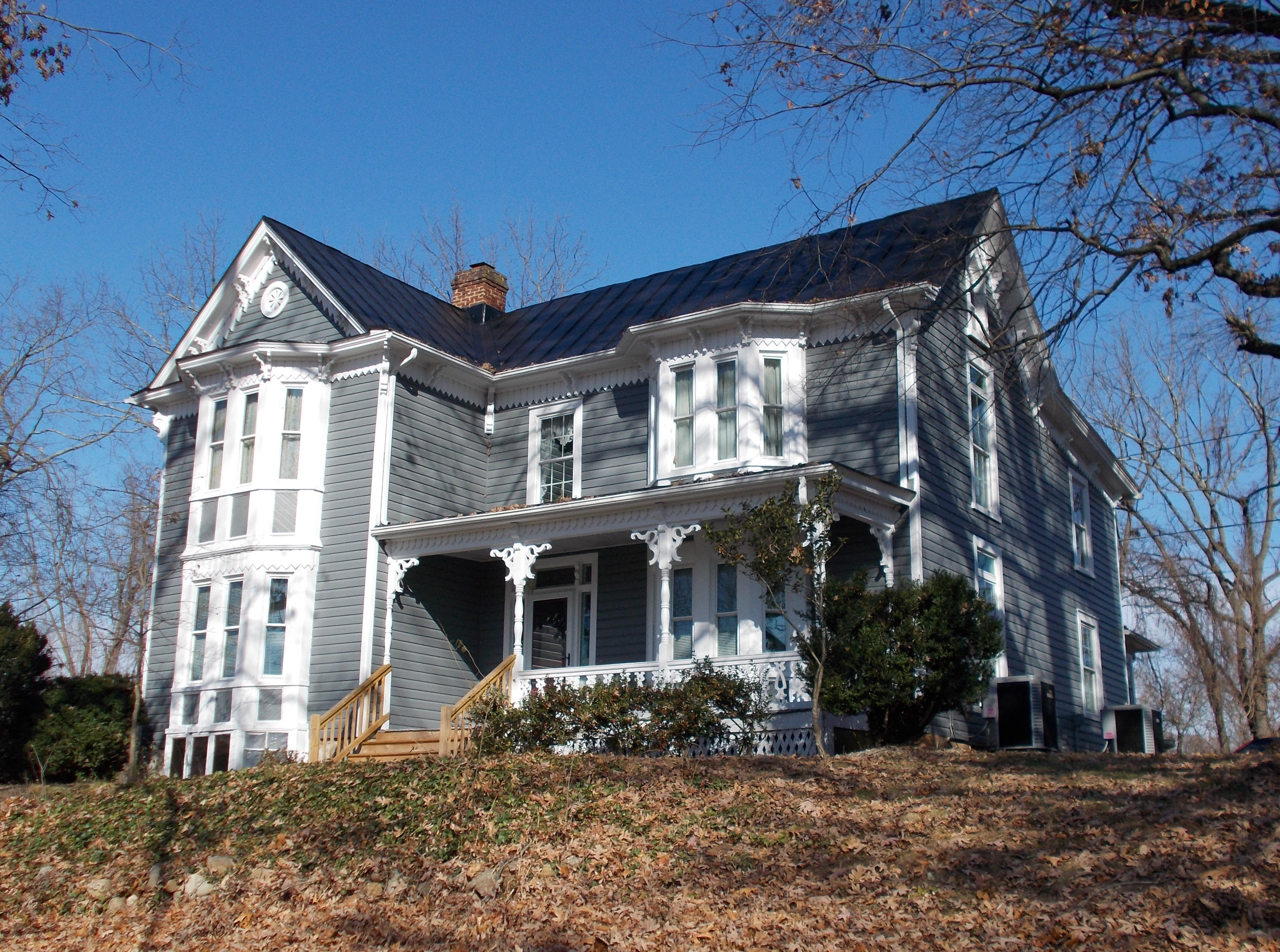
- W. N. Seay House, November 2012

- Location within Virginia Location within the United States
- Location: 245 W. 26th St., Buena Vista, Virginia
- Coordinates: 37°44′36″N 79°21′12″W
- Area: less than one acre
- Built: 1889
- Architectural style: Late Victorian
- NRHP reference No.: 07000826
- VLR No.: 103-5054

Significant dates
- Added to NRHP: August 16, 2007
- Designated VLR: June 6, 2007

W. N. Seay House is a historic home located at Buena Vista, Virginia. It was built in 1889, and is a two-story, weatherboarded balloon-frame Late Victorian style dwelling. It features a highly decorated, one-story, three-bay porch with turned, bracketed posts and jig-sawn balustrade. Also on the property is a garage/utility building (c. 1900) with board-and-batten siding. It was built by William Nelson Seay (1850–1939), who helped found Buena Vista.

It was listed on the National Register of Historic Places in 2007.
