= Colored =

Racial exonym

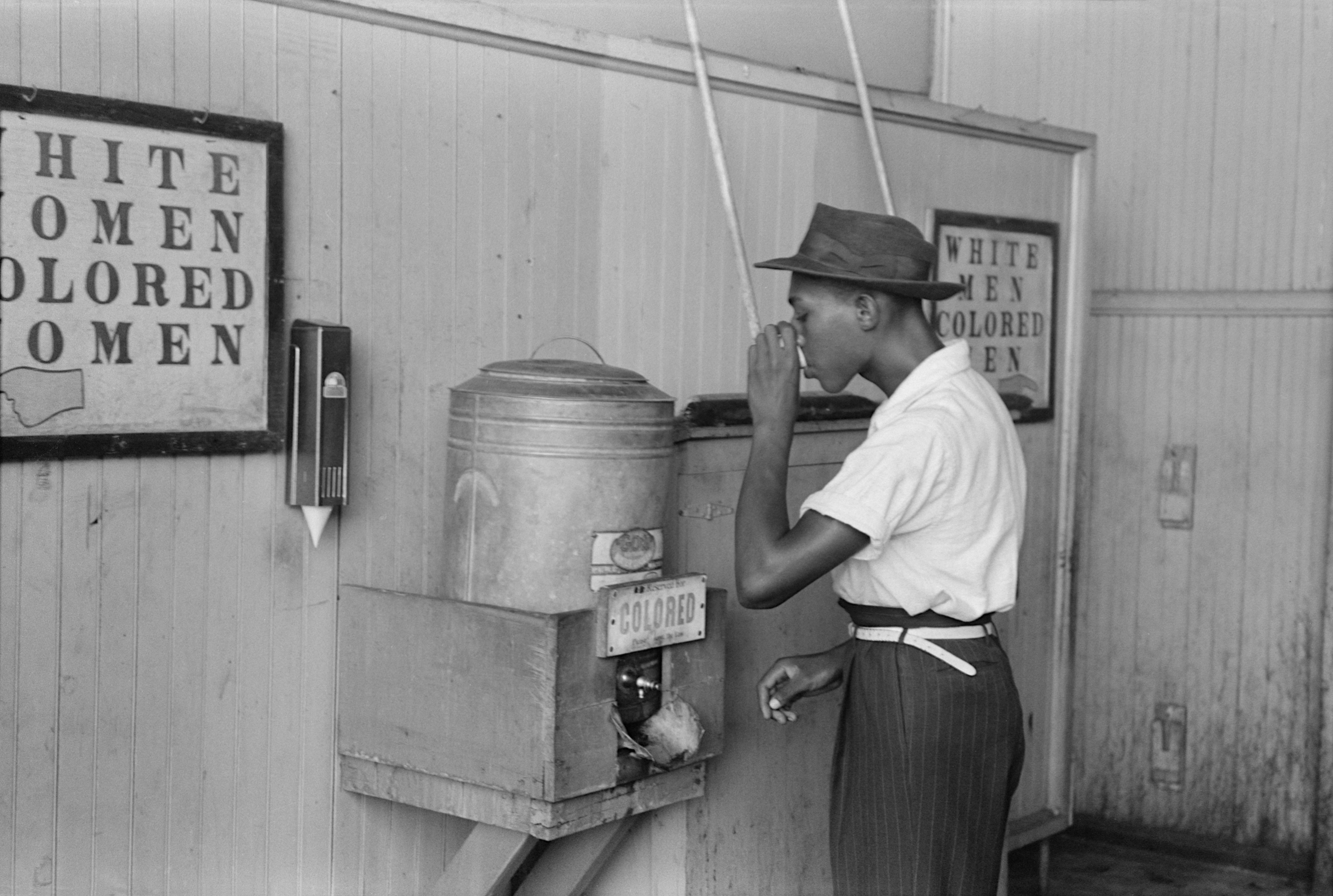
Photograph by Russell Lee showing historical use of the term in the US in contrast with "white". Besides the big signs, the water cooler itself is labelled with a sign reading "colored".

Colored (or coloured) is a racial descriptor historically used in the United States during the Jim Crow era to refer to an African American. It may be considered a slur in the United States and the United Kingdom.

== Dictionary definitions ==
The word colored (Middle English icoloured) was first used in the 14th century but with a meaning other than race or ethnicity. The earliest uses of the term to denote a member of dark-skinned groups of peoples occurred in the second part of the 18th century in reference to South America. According to the Oxford English Dictionary, "colored" was first used in this context in 1758 to translate the Spanish term mujeres de color ('colored women') in Antonio de Ulloa's A voyage to South America.

The term came in use in the United States during the early 19th century, and it then was adopted by emancipated slaves as a term of racial pride after the end of the American Civil War until it was replaced as a self-designation by Black or African-American during the second part of the 20th century. Due to its use in the Jim Crow era to designate items or places restricted to African Americans, the word colored is now usually considered to be offensive.

The term has historically had multiple connotations. In British usage, the term refers to "a person who is wholly or partly of non-white descent," and its use is generally regarded as antiquated or offensive. Other terms are preferable, particularly when referring to a single ethnicity.

== United States ==
Dilapidated hotel sign, Route 80, Statesboro, Georgia. The picture was taken in 1979, after the end of segregation.

In the United States, colored was the predominant and preferred term for African Americans in the mid- to late 19th century in part because it was accepted by both white and black Americans as more inclusive, covering those of mixed-race ancestry (and, less commonly, Asian Americans and other racial minorities), as well as those who were considered to have "complete Black ancestry". They did not think of themselves as or accept the label African, did not want whites pressuring them to relocate to a colony in Africa, and said they were no more African than white Americans were European. In place of "African" they preferred the term colored, or the more learned and precise Negro. However, the term Negro later fell from favor following the Civil Rights Movement as it was seen as imposed upon the community it described by white people during slavery, and carried connotations of subservience. The term black was preferred during the 1960s by the Black Power movement, as well as radical black nationalists (the Black Muslims and the Black Panthers), pan-Africanists (Stokely Carmichael, leader of the Student Nonviolent Coordinating Committee) and political progressives. "Negro" was still favored as self-descriptive racial term over "black" by a plurality in the late 1960s; however, by the late 1970s and early 1980s, "black" was strongly favored.

NPR reported that the "use of the phrase 'colored people' peaked in books published in 1970." However, some individuals have more recently called for a revival of "African American", or "Afro-American", so as to remove attention to skin color. "Colored people lived in three neighborhoods that were clearly demarcated, as if by ropes or turnstiles", wrote Harvard professor Henry Louis Gates Jr. about growing up in segregated West Virginia in the 1960s. "Welcome to the Colored Zone, a large stretched banner could have said .... Of course, the colored world was not so much a neighborhood as a condition of existence." "For most of my childhood, we couldn't eat in restaurants or sleep in hotels, we couldn't use certain bathrooms or try on clothes in stores", recalls Gates. His mother retaliated by not buying clothes that she was not allowed to try on. He remembered hearing a white man deliberately calling his father by the wrong name: "'He knows my name, boy,' my father said after a long pause. 'He calls all colored people George.'" When Gates's cousin became the first black cheerleader at the local high school, she was not allowed to sit with the team and drink Coke from a glass, but had to stand at the counter drinking from a paper cup. Gates also wrote about his experiences in his 1995 book, Colored People: A Memoir.

=== Census terms in the United States ===
In 1851, an article in The New York Times referred to the "colored population". In 1863, the War Department established the Bureau of Colored Troops.

The first 12 United States Census counts counted "colored" people, who totaled nine million in 1900. The censuses of 1910–1960 counted "negroes".

=== Term in NAACP ===
The term is still used in the name of the National Association for the Advancement of Colored People, although it is generally referred to as the NAACP. In 2008, its communications director Carla Sims said "the term 'colored' is not derogatory, [the NAACP] chose the word 'colored' because it was the most positive description commonly used [in 1909, when the association was founded]. It's outdated and antiquated but not offensive." However, NAACP today rarely uses its full name and made this decision not long after the United Negro College Fund switched to using just UNCF or United Fund.

== See also ==
- Anglo-African term
- Anglo-Indian
- Anti-racism
- Black people
- BAME
- Casta
- Colored school
- Colored American Magazine
- Critical race theory
- Free people of color
- Person of color
- Negro
- Nigger
- Nigga
- Native American name controversy
- Race
- Racism
