= Huntersville Colored High School =

Historic school building in North Carolina, United States

- U.S. National Register of Historic Places
- Location within North Carolina Location within the United States
- Location: 302 Holbrooks Rd., Huntersville, North Carolina
- Coordinates: 35°23′53″N 80°50′5″W
- Area: 4.5 acres (1.8 ha)
- Built: 1937, 1953, 1957
- Architectural style: Colonial Revival, International Style
- NRHP reference No.: 09000636
- Added to NRHP: August 20, 2009

Huntersville Colored High School, also known as Torrence-Lytle High School, is a historic high school complex located at Huntersville, Mecklenburg County, North Carolina. The main building is a variegated red brick, Colonial Revival main block built in 1937 with two-story International Style wings constructed in 1957. The original section was built under the auspices of the Public Works Administration. Also on the property is the elementary school building built in 1953 and a gymnasium built in 1957. The elementary school is a long, one-story, rectangular, red brick building. The complex continued to function as a public school until 1966.

It was added to the National Register of Historic Places in 2009.
