= Old Courthouse (Buena Vista, Virginia) =

Historic courthouse in Virginia, US

- U.S. National Register of Historic Places
- U.S. Historic district – Contributing property
- Virginia Landmarks Register
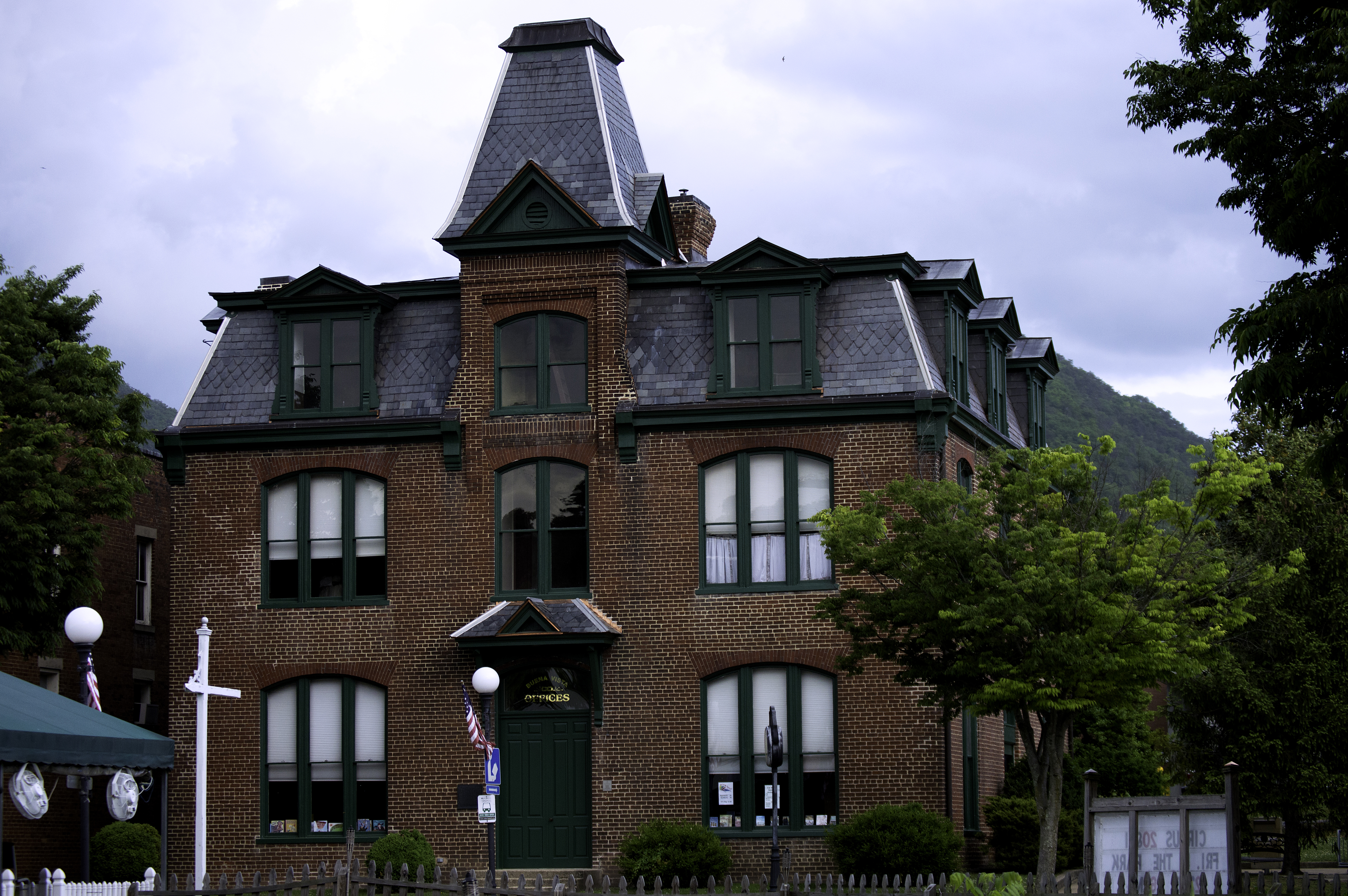
- Old Courthouse, Buena Vista VA, 18 May 2015

- Location within Virginia Location within the United States
- Location: 2110 Magnolia Ave., Buena Vista, Virginia
- Coordinates: 37°44′4″N 79°21′15″W
- Area: less than one acre
- Built: 1890
- Architectural style: Second Empire
- NRHP reference No.: 79003297
- VLR No.: 103-0003

Significant dates
- Added to NRHP: May 25, 1979
- Designated VLR: May 16, 1978

The Old Courthouse, also known as the Buena Vista Land Company building, is a historic courthouse building located at Buena Vista, Virginia. It was built in 1890, and is a 2 1/2-story, brick building with a mansard roof in the Second Empire style. It originally housed the Treasurer's Office, Mayor's Office, Office of the Clerk of Court, the courtroom Attorney's offices, the telephone exchange, and the local Odd Fellow's Lodge. The local public library has occupied the building since 1971, after a new municipal building was constructed.

It was listed on the National Register of Historic Places in 1979. It is located in the Buena Vista Downtown Historic District.

== Gallery ==
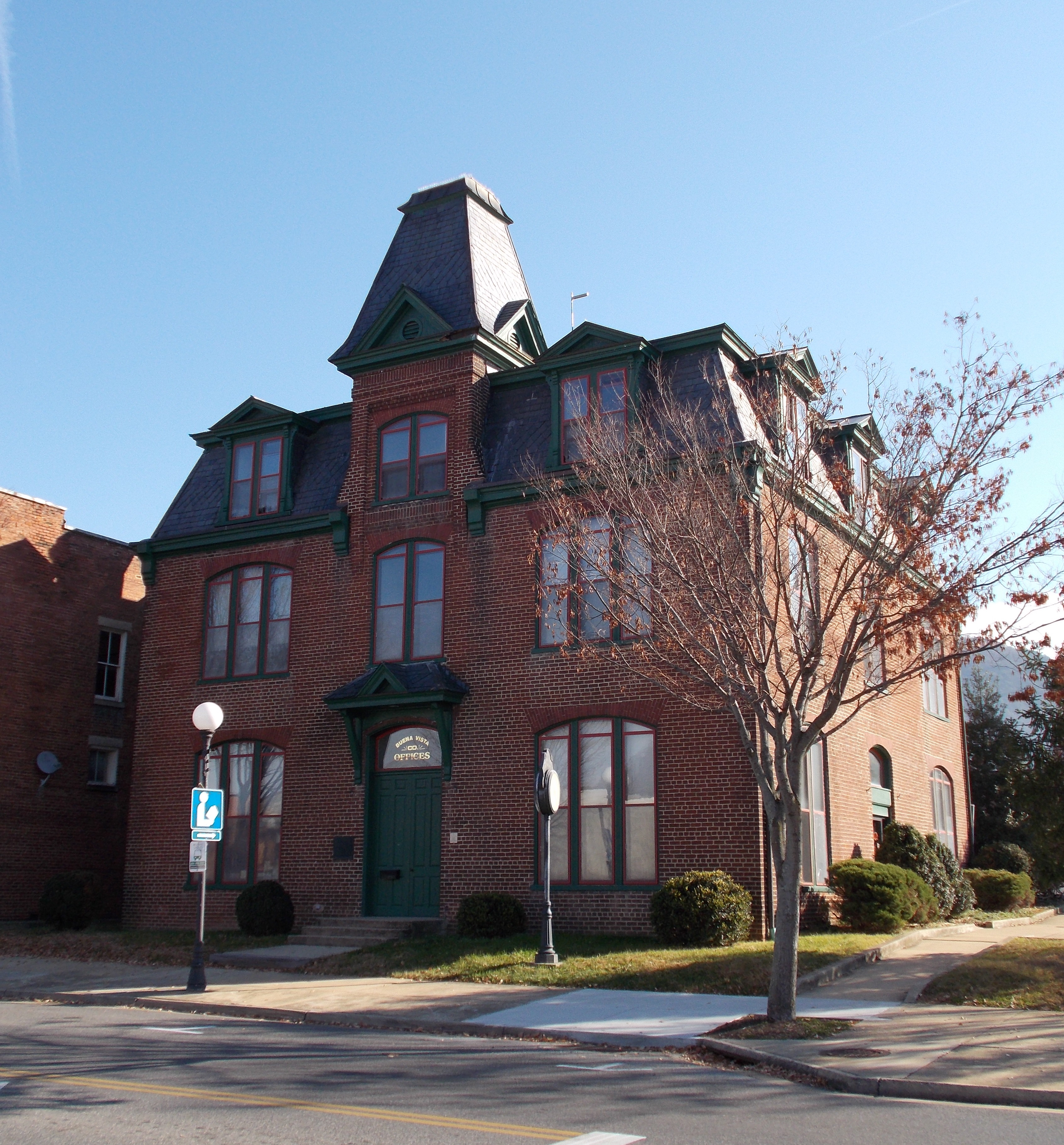
Old Courthouse, Buena Vista, November 2011
