= Havre de Grace Colored School Museum and Cultural Center =

Museum and former school in Havre de Grace, Maryland, US

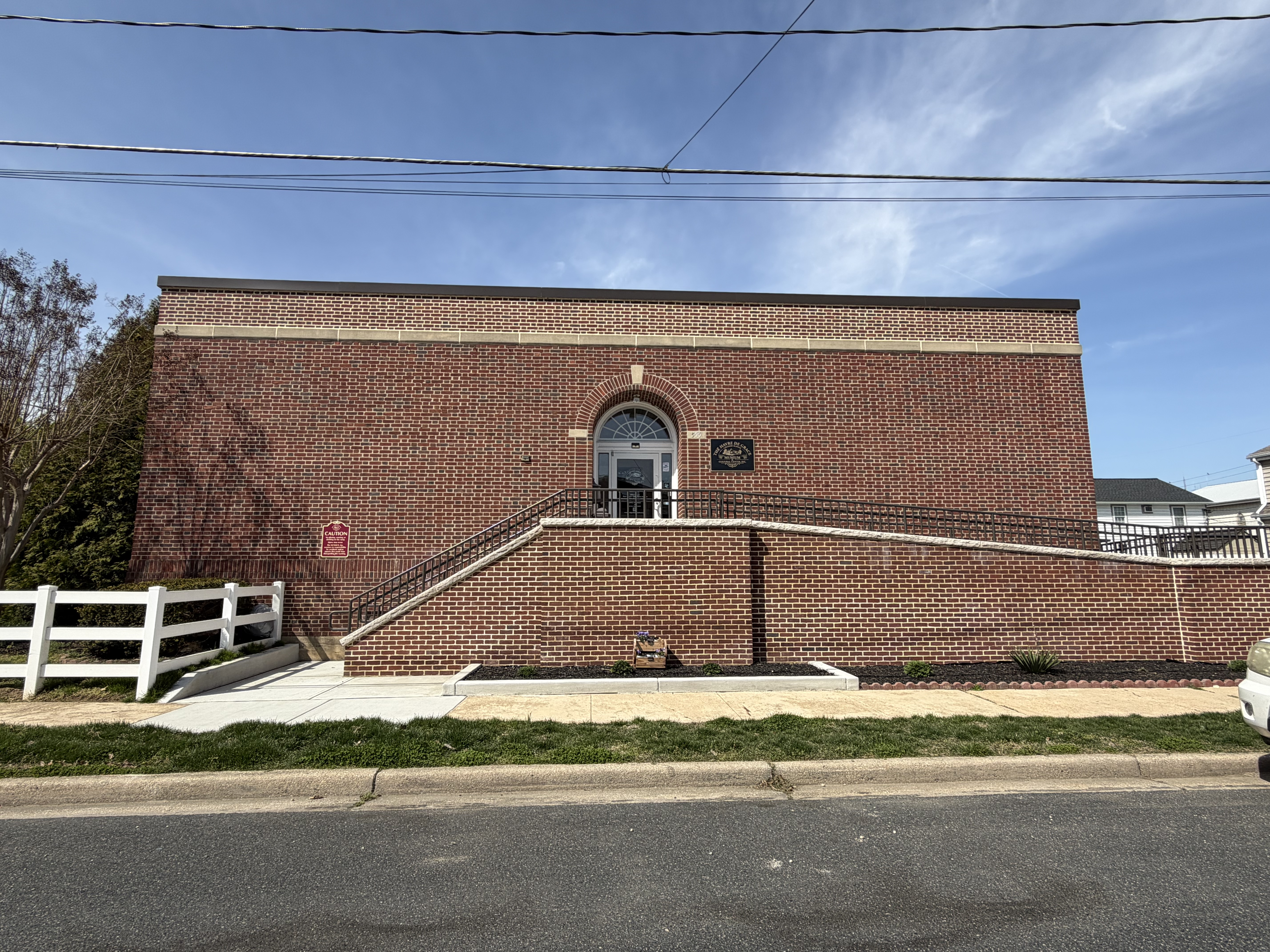
The Havre de Grace Colored School Museum and Cultural Center

The Havre de Grace Colored School Museum and Cultural Center is located at 555 Alliance Street, Havre de Grace, Maryland, in the buildings of the former Havre de Grace Colored High School. The buildings have been partially restored and in 2022, donations were sought to complete the work.

== Havre de Grace Colored High School history ==
The Havre de Grace Colored School opened in 1912 in a one-room frame building. It was built with $1,500 raised by the Black community (equivalent to $58,741 in 2025), plus $200 from the city of Havre de Grace (equivalent to $6,911 in 2025). It was, during the Jim Crow period, one of more than 14 grammar schools for African-American children in Harford County. There was no high school for them in the county. Instead, Black parents sent their children to Baltimore or Philadelphia for high school.

In 1930, a coalition of African-American parents, teachers, civic leaders, and white state lawmakers established Havre de Grace Colored High School, the county's first secondary school for Black children. With the addition in 1936 of a one-story brick annex to the one-room schoolhouse, the new high school quickly became a source of pride for the Black community, seen as the best tool for their children's advancement. The school had no sports facility. In the beginning, there was no school bus, and students were responsible for their own transportation.

The poet Langston Hughes spoke at the school several times and passed through Havre de Grace frequently while studying at nearby Lincoln University (Pennsylvania). He was a close friend and fraternity brother of the school's principal, Leon Roye.

In 1953, the school closed, and all Colored Schools in Havre de Grace, both elementary and high, combined to form the Havre de Grace Consolidated School, at a new location. In 1965, Harford County schools were integrated and the segregated Black schools closed. The buildings were used as a physician's office. After his death in 2015, the buildings were transferred to the non-profit Museum project.

== Havre de Grace Colored School Museum and Cultural Center ==
With help from the architecture department at Morgan State University, and the Havre de Grace Colored School Foundation, they collected and archived donations of photos, diplomas, books, documents, and other artifacts from alumni. The Havre de Grace Colored School Museum and Cultural Center opened to the public in the spring of 2019.

== Media ==
- Cardin, Rachael (November 1, 2021), Former Students, Advocates Hope To Preserve Havre De Grace Colored School, WJZ-TV, archived from the original on February 14, 2022
