= Hiram Colored School =

Historic school in Hiram, Georgia, US

- U.S. National Register of Historic Places
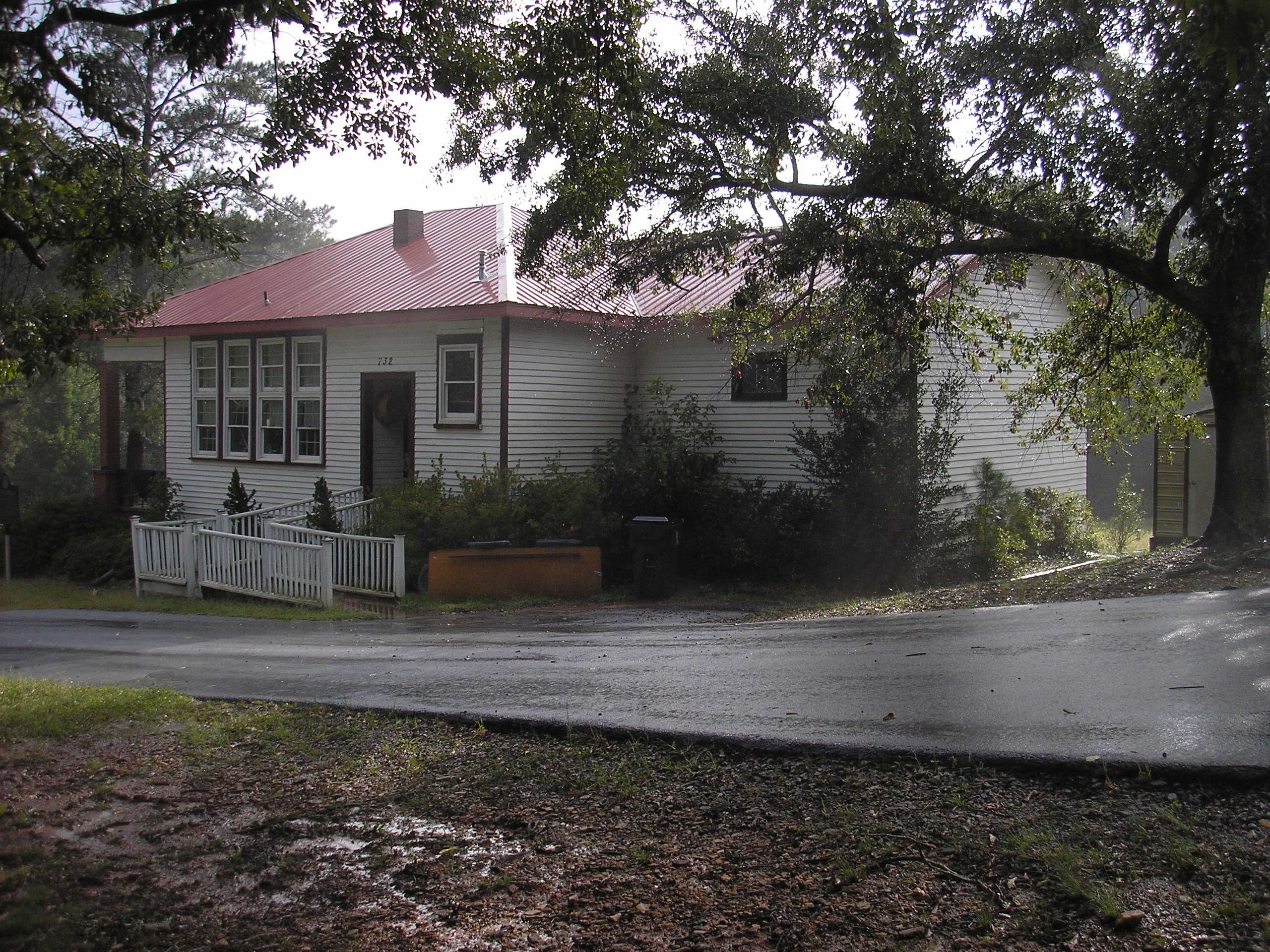

- Location within Georgia
- Location: W of GA 92 bet. jct. of Fitzgerald and Ragsdale Sts., Hiram, Georgia
- Coordinates: 33°52′53″N 84°45′36″W
- Area: 1.7 acres (0.69 ha)
- Built: 1930
- NRHP reference No.: 01000494
- Added to NRHP: May 10, 2001

The Hiram Colored School in Hiram in Paulding County, Georgia was built in 1930. It was listed on the National Register of Historic Places in 2001. The school is located west of Georgia State Route 92 between its junctions with Fitzgerald Street and Alexander Street (formerly Ragsdale Street).

It is a two-room Rosenwald school, built with funding from Julius Rosenwald, President of Sears, Roebuck and Company. The Rosenwald Fund was established in 1912 to build schools for African-American students in Southern rural areas. Though nearly 5000 schools were built using the Rosenwald Fund, the Hiram Colored School was the only Rosenwald school in Paulding County. It was also the only African-American school in the county with a library. Today, its historical significance is preserved by the Hiram Rosenwald School Preservation Committee.

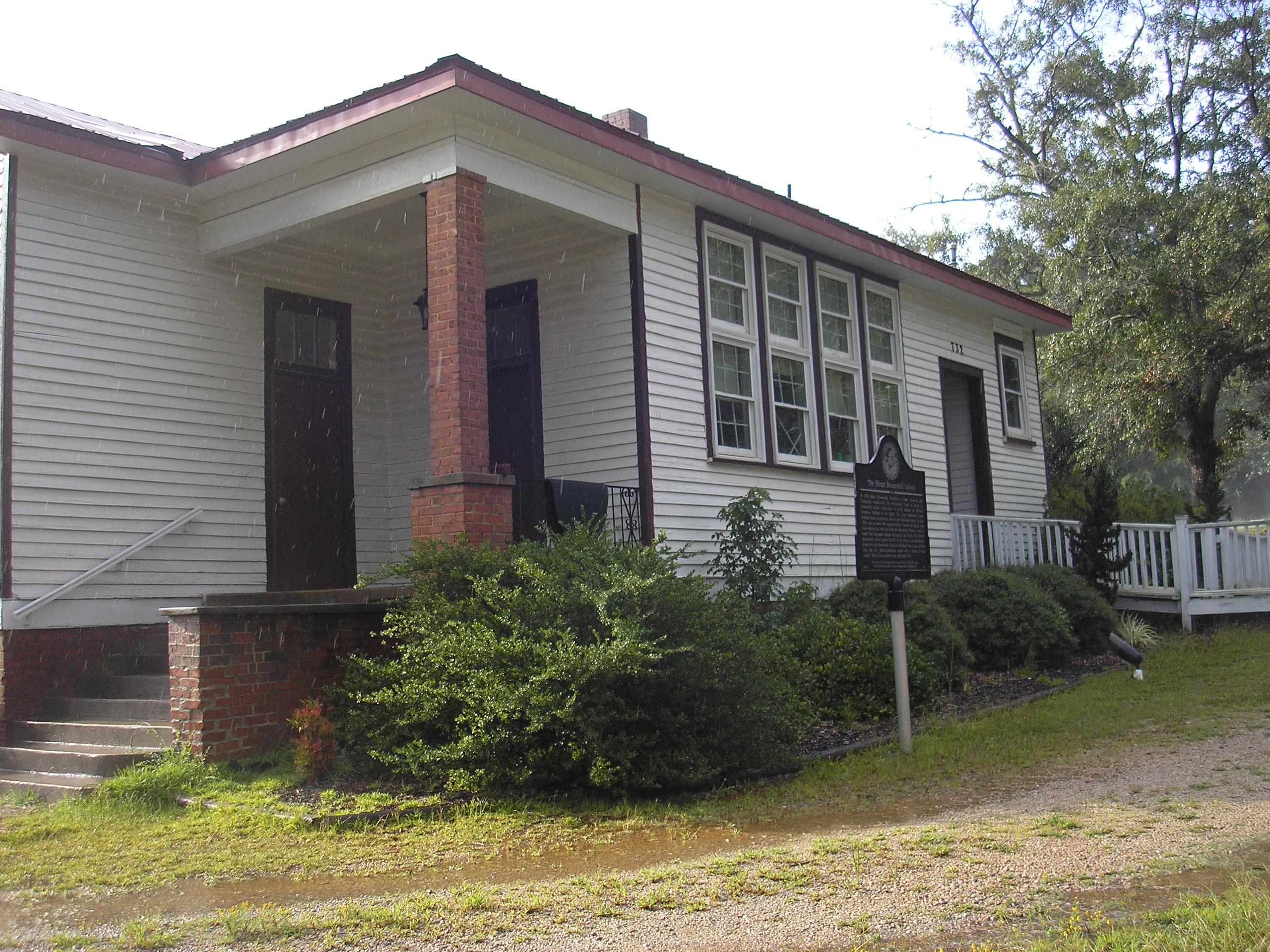
From another angle
