= Westgate High School =

Location
- 2305 Jefferson Island Road, New Iberia, Louisiana; 70560; United States; 29.9987°N 91.8572°W

Information
- School type: Public
- Locale: Rural
- School district: Iberia Parish School System
- NCES District ID: 2200720
- NCES School ID: 220072000525
- Enrollment: 990 (2023–2024)
- Student to teacher ratio: 14.27
- Colors: Purple and gold
- Nickname: Tigers
- Website: whs.iberiaschools.org

Westgate High School is a public high school in unincorporated Iberia Parish, Louisiana, near New Iberia. It is a part of the Iberia Parish School System. It is located at 2305 Jefferson Island Road in New Iberia, Louisiana, U.S.

== About ==
It is a Title 1 eligible school. The demographics for the 2021–2022 school year enrollment are 28.9% White, 59.1% Black, 6.9% Asian, 3.1% Hispanic, 1.9% two or more races, and 0.1% Native American or Alaskan Native.

== History ==
Westgate High School campus was preceded by the New Iberia Freshman High School (or Freshman High School), and the even earlier segregated Jonas Henderson High School (1950–1969) for African American students only.

== Athletics ==
Westgate High athletics competes in the LHSAA. They won the state football championships in 2021.
