= Buena Vista, Virginia =

Independent city in Virginia, United States

- Independent city
- City of Buena Vista
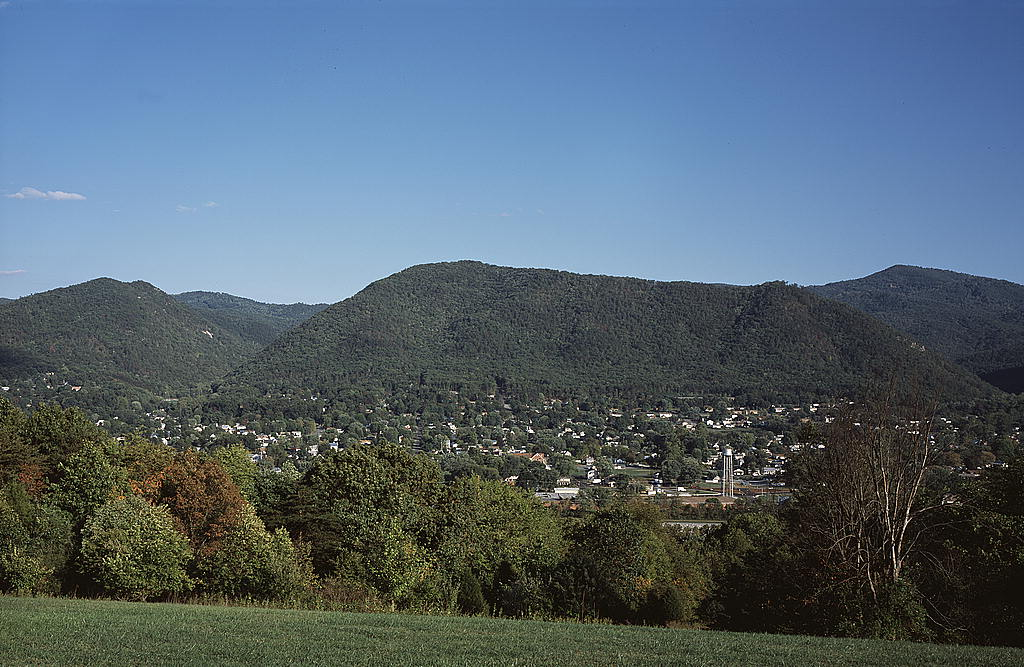

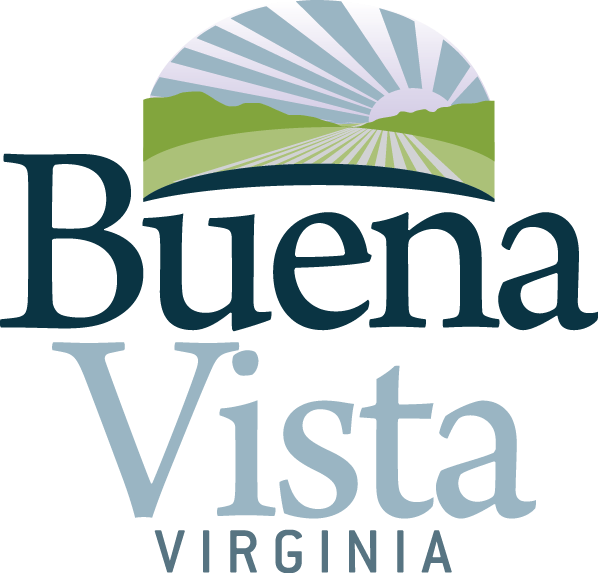
- Seal

- Location within Shenandoah Valley Location within Virginia Location within the United States
- Coordinates: 37°44′04″N 79°21′15″W
- Country: United States
- State: Virginia
- Hart's Bottom Green Forest Green Valley: c. 1800
- Buena Vista: December 1888
- Incorporated (town): 1890
- Incorporated (independent city): 15 February 1892

Government
  - Mayor: Jesse Lineberry (I)

Area
  - Total: 6.52 sq mi (16.89 km^{2})
  - Land: 6.44 sq mi (16.67 km^{2})
  - Water: 0.085 sq mi (0.22 km^{2})
- Elevation: 837 ft (255 m)

Population (2020)
  - Total: 6,641
  - Estimate (2025): 6,672 ▲
  - Density: 1,032/sq mi (398.4/km^{2})
- Time zone: UTC−5 (Eastern (EST))
  - Summer (DST): UTC−4 (EDT)
- Zip code: 24416
- FIPS code: 51-11032
- GNIS feature ID: 1492666
- Website: www.buenavistava.org

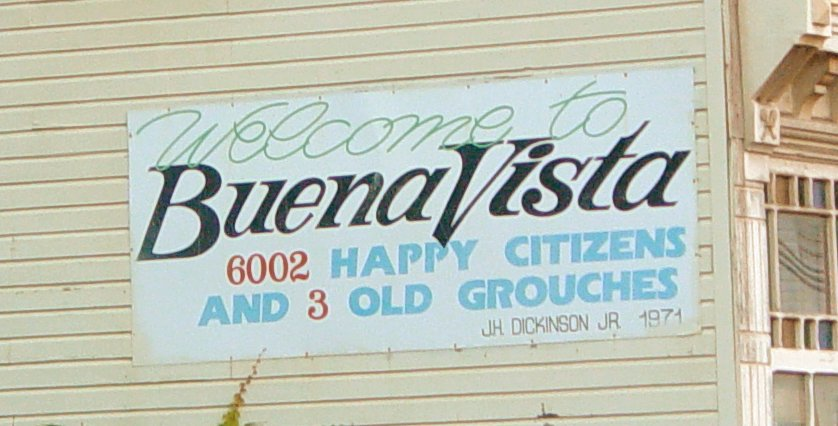
"6002 happy citizens and 3 old grouches"

Buena Vista (/ˌbjuːnə ˈvɪstə/ BEW-nə VIST-ə), called "BV" by locals, is an independent city located in the Blue Ridge Mountains region of Virginia in the United States. As of the 2020 census, the population was 6,641. The Bureau of Economic Analysis combines the independent cities of Buena Vista and Lexington, along with surrounding Rockbridge County, for statistical purposes.

The city is located approximately 39 miles northwest of Lynchburg and 56 miles northeast of Roanoke.

== History ==
Formerly named Hart's Bottom, Green Forest or Green Valley until 1888, and chartered as a town in 1890, Buena Vista separated politically from surrounding Rockbridge County when granted a city charter on February 15, 1892.

The Buena Vista Downtown Historic District, Buena Vista Colored School, Cedar Hill, Glen Maury, Old Courthouse, Southern Seminary Main Building, and W.N. Seay House are listed on the National Register of Historic Places.

=== Early history ===
One civil war survey from 1863 lists a half dozen buildings on the site of what is now Buena Vista, including the Paxton and Majors properties and lists both as having mills along the Maury River, then called the “North River“. The city itself was founded by Benjamin C. Moomaw in the late 1800s, and originally consisted only of a simple tannery at the intersection of two railroads and a canal. The Richmond and Alleghany Railroad and the Shenandoah Valley Railroad, stood alongside the James River Canal that had been used to transport materials from the Atlantic ports of Virginia to Lexington since the 18th century, but by the founding of the city had been converted for the distribution of water power. After opening the tannery, Moomaw opened a pulp mill and a canning factory. In 1882 Appold & Sons Tannery opened, and the first public school opened in 1885.

In 1893, the town was described as "one of the many new towns that seem to have sprung up as if by magic in some parts of Virginia." In that same year, they passed a law banning the sale of alcohol, effectively making it a dry town. Prior to 1889 none of the 600 dwellings, churches, stores, hotels and other buildings in the town had been built "but where are streets and all that goes to make a booming city the reapers that year gathered a luxuriant crop of wheat." In December 1888, Moomaw wrote the Buena Vista Prospectus to organize a town and began selling stock. "It took only 30 days for all the stock to be sold for a total of $400,000. With the sale completed, it was time to lay out the town and begin recruiting people and industries." On February 22, 1889, a large deposit of iron ore was reportedly discovered that resulted in a boom of economic activity that lasted until March 4, 1892. In just those three years the community grew extensively, adding a new brick school house, an opera house, two churches, a luxury hotel, a new Masonic Lodge (Buena Vista Lodge No. 186), a paper and pulp mill, a saddle factory, a cashmere mill, two brick and clay works, a wagon works, two banks, an egg crate factory, an electric light plant, a furniture and chair factory, a boiler factory, an iron furnace and steel factory, a glass foundry, and several wood and lumber establishments.

=== Flooding ===
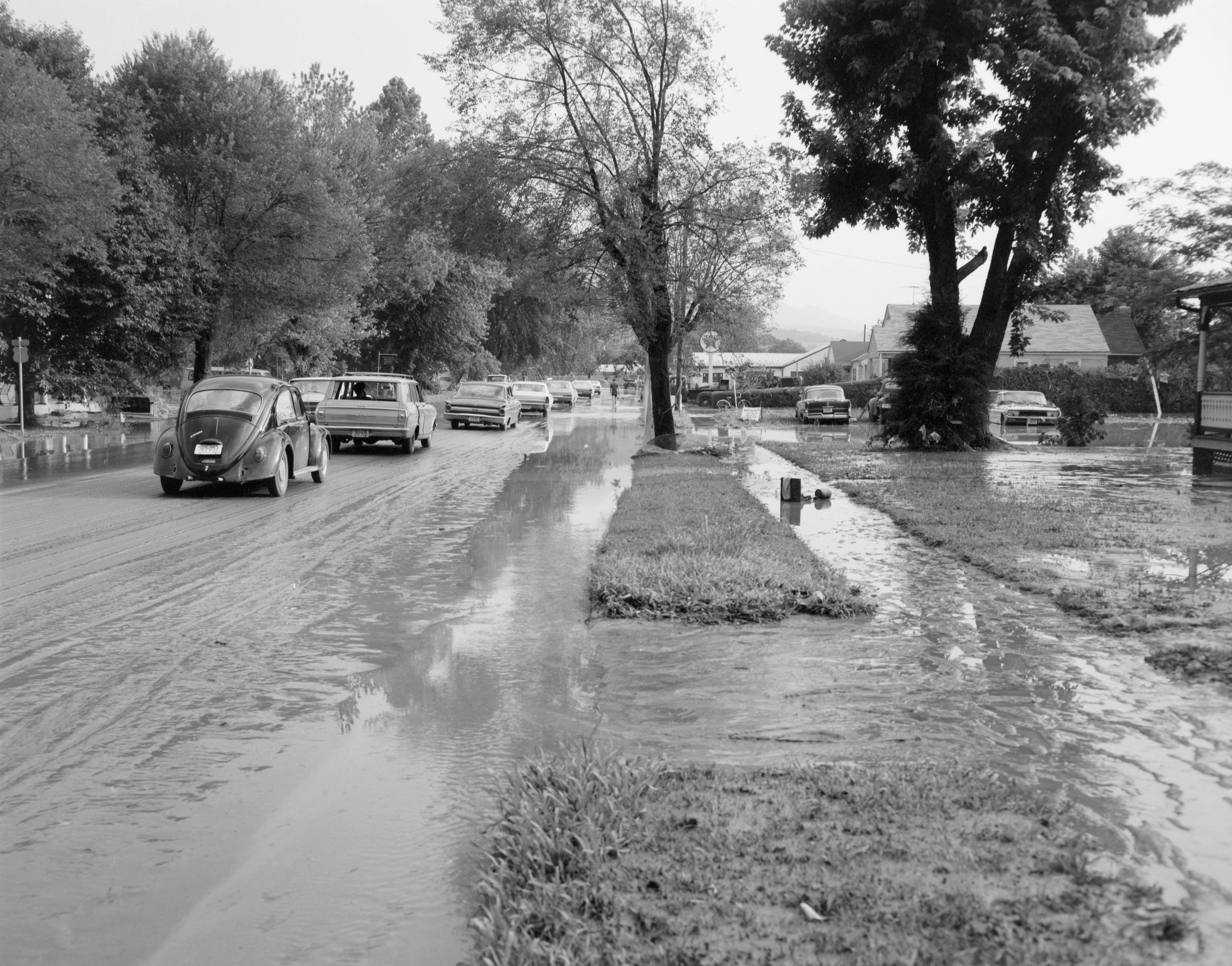
Flooding in Buena Vista caused by the passage of Hurricane Camille through the area

Buena Vista is situated on the east side of the Maury River at the western foot of the Blue Ridge Mountains. The Maury has a history of destructive floods damaging nearby communities. Particularly notable were floods on Oct 12, 1870, on the death of Robert E. Lee, when the Maury River provided Lee a temporary coffin due to a dock washed away up river (source: Library Virginia Military Institute), and in 1936, 1969, 1985 and 1995. The Flood of '69 was the result of rainfall from the inland movement of Hurricane Camille. The Flood of '85 resulted from the convergence of three systems, including Hurricane Juan, which dumped tremendous amounts of rain on western Virginia. The flood of record for the lower Maury River (downstream of the confluence with the South River), including Buena Vista and Glasgow, occurred on August 20, 1969, at a stage of 31.23 feet (9.52 m) on the Buena Vista gauge. (Flooding begins at 17.0 feet (5.2 m) and major flooding at 21.0 feet (6.4 m).) The downtowns of Buena Vista and Glasgow were submerged in over 5 feet (1.5 m) of water. The upper Maury River including Lexington saw its flood of record during the Flood of 1985 when the gauging station at Rockbridge Baths recorded a value of 19.19 feet (5.85 m) from flood marks. The difference in flooding results from differing contributions of the South River depending on rainfall in the respective watersheds.

The James C. Olin Flood Control Project was completed in 1997 to reduce the potential for damage from flooding of the Maury River and inland streams in Buena Vista. The project consists of a 2.5-mile levee wall, topped by a walking trail known as the River Walk.

== Geography ==
Buena Vista is located at 37°44′04″N 79°21′15″W (37.734455, -79.354277). It is surrounded by, but separate from, Rockbridge County. The Maury River forms part of the western boundary of Buena Vista, with the city limits crossing the river in one area to encompass Glen Maury Park on the west side.

U.S. Route 60 passes through the north side of Buena Vista, leading northwest 6 miles (10 km) to Lexington and east across the Blue Ridge Mountains 26 miles (42 km) to Amherst. US 60 intersects Interstate 81 3.5 miles (5.6 km) west of Buena Vista. U.S. Route 501 has its northern terminus in the city and leads south 38 miles (61 km) to Lynchburg, passing through the James River gorge.

According to the United States Census Bureau, the city has a total area of 6.8 square miles (17.6 km^{2}), of which 6.7 square miles (17.4 km^{2}) is land and 0.1 square miles (0.2 km^{2}), or 1.27%, is water.

== Demographics ==
Historical population
Census	Pop.	Note	%±
1890	1,044		—
1900	2,388		128.7%
1910	3,245		35.9%
1920	3,911		20.5%
1930	4,002		2.3%
1940	4,335		8.3%
1950	5,214		20.3%
1960	6,300		20.8%
1970	6,425		2.0%
1980	6,717		4.5%
1990	6,406		−4.6%
2000	6,349		−0.9%
2010	6,650		4.7%
2020	6,641		−0.1%
2025 (est.)	6,672	▲	0.5%
U.S. Decennial Census; 1790–1960 1900–1990; 1990–2000 2010 2020

=== Racial and ethnic composition ===
Buena Vista city, Virginia – Racial and ethnic composition Note: the US Census treats Hispanic/Latino as an ethnic category. This table excludes Latinos from the racial categories and assigns them to a separate category. Hispanics/Latinos may be of any race.
Race / Ethnicity (NH = Non-Hispanic)	Pop 1980	Pop 1990	Pop 2000	Pop 2010	Pop 2020	% 1980	% 1990	% 2000	% 2010	% 2020
White alone (NH)	6,402	6,086	5,889	5,982	5,660	95.31%	95.00%	92.75%	89.95%	85.23%
Black or African American alone (NH)	263	280	302	345	289	3.92%	4.37%	4.76%	5.19%	4.35%
Native American or Alaska Native alone (NH)	1	5	19	71	39	0.01%	0.08%	0.30%	1.07%	0.59%
Asian alone (NH)	6	21	27	29	24	0.09%	0.33%	0.43%	0.44%	0.36%
Native Hawaiian or Pacific Islander alone (NH)	x	x	1	12	24	x	x	0.02%	0.18%	0.36%
Other race alone (NH)	3	2	0	0	18	0.04%	0.03%	0.00%	0.00%	0.27%
Mixed race or Multiracial (NH)	x	x	47	108	358	x	x	0.74%	1.62%	5.39%
Hispanic or Latino (any race)	42	12	64	103	229	0.63%	0.19%	1.01%	1.55%	3.45%
Total	6,717	6,406	6,349	6,650	6,641	100.00%	100.00%	100.00%	100.00%	100.00%

=== 2020 census ===
As of the 2020 census, Buena Vista had a population of 6,641, a median age of 37.5 years, 19.4% of residents under the age of 18, 20.0% of residents 65 years of age or older, 93.4 males for every 100 females, and 89.7 males for every 100 females age 18 and over.

97.8% of residents lived in urban areas, while 2.2% lived in rural areas.

There were 2,599 households in Buena Vista, of which 28.2% had children under the age of 18 living in them. Of all households, 41.9% were married-couple households, 19.4% were households with a male householder and no spouse or partner present, and 32.1% were households with a female householder and no spouse or partner present. About 31.7% of all households were made up of individuals, and 15.6% had someone living alone who was 65 years of age or older.

There were 2,948 housing units, of which 11.8% were vacant. The homeowner vacancy rate was 2.8% and the rental vacancy rate was 10.1%.

Racial composition as of the 2020 census
Race	Number	Percent
White	5,740	86.4%
Black or African American	289	4.4%
American Indian and Alaska Native	49	0.7%
Asian	29	0.4%
Native Hawaiian and Other Pacific Islander	24	0.4%
Some other race	63	0.9%
Two or more races	447	6.7%
Hispanic or Latino (of any race)	229	3.4%

=== 2018 census estimates ===
Based on Census population estimates and American Community Survey (ACS) estimates for 2018, the population of Buena Vista was 6,237 people, consisting of 2,539 households. 2.6% of the population was under 5, 17.4% were under 18, and 19.5% were 65 and older. The majority of the population were white at 89.9%, followed by Black or African American at 5.5%, and 2.7% were of Hispanic or Latino ethnicity. The median household income was $34,273, and 15.2% of persons were below the poverty line.

Additionally, the Census estimated there were 2,864 housing units in 2018. 66.7% of units were owner-occupied, and the median value of these owner-occupied units was $122,100. The median gross rent was $739.

== Education ==
Buena Vista is home to Southern Virginia University, which had an enrollment of 1,106 full-time students in the fall of 2019.

The independent Buena Vista City Public School (BVCPS) system serves residents of the City. The enrollment for the 2019-2020 school year was 895 students pre-K through 12. The system's four schools are fully accredited by the Virginia Department of Education.

There are four schools in the system:

- F. W. Kling Elementary, serving grades Pre-K through 2
- Enderly Heights Elementary, serving grades 3 through 5
- Parry McCluer Middle, serving grades 6-7
- Parry McCluer High, serving grades 8-12

== Media ==
Buena Vista is within the Roanoke/Lynchburg media market. Local television news coverage is provided by television stations based in Roanoke, Virginia. The Roanoke Times is Buena Vista's major daily newspaper. Several non-daily print publications are produced locally which cover the Buena Vista, Lexington, and Rockbridge County area as listed below:

- The Rockbridge Advocate (monthly magazine)
- The News-Gazette (weekly newspaper)
- The Rockbridge Report (weekly website and cable broadcast by the students at Washington and Lee University)

Additionally, Buena Vista is the city of license for classic hits-formatted radio station 96.7 3WZ.

== Landmarks ==
Landmarks and historic sites in Buena Vista include the 1890 Buena Vista Hotel (now Main Hall at SVU), original Buena Vista Courthouse (now A.B. Modine Memorial Library), Canton Chinese Restaurant and Glen Maury Park, particularly the two-story wooden pavilion which provides 360 degree views of the surrounding landscape.

== Climate ==
The climate in this area is characterized by hot, humid summers and generally mild to cool winters. According to the Köppen Climate Classification system, Buena Vista has a humid subtropical climate, abbreviated "Cfa" on climate maps.

== Notable people ==
- Major League Baseball World Series champion manager Charlie Manuel of the Philadelphia Phillies was a Buena Vista resident and is a graduate of Parry McCluer High School where he was a multi-sport star. Manuel played in the Major Leagues and Japan during his playing career in the 1960s and 1970s.
- Author Gary Jennings. Best selling historical fiction writer famous for the novel Aztec. He was born in Buena Vista.

== Politics ==
Buena Vista was a Democratic stronghold for decades after it was incorporated, and beginning in the 1950s it was a swing county. Since 2000, the city has swung heavily into the Republican column. In the 2024 election, Donald Trump won the highest percentage for any Republican presidential candidate in the city’s history.

United States presidential election results for Buena Vista, Virginia
Year	Republican		Democratic		Third party(ies)	
Year	No.	%	No.	%	No.	%
1892	86	20.14%	341	79.86%	0	0.00%
1896	184	45.21%	219	53.81%	4	0.98%
1900	204	47.89%	215	50.47%	7	1.64%
1904	79	37.62%	125	59.52%	6	2.86%
1908	80	36.53%	137	62.56%	2	0.91%
1912	43	16.73%	155	60.31%	59	22.96%
1916	92	36.51%	158	62.70%	2	0.79%
1920	154	36.93%	262	62.83%	1	0.24%
1924	149	38.01%	235	59.95%	8	2.04%
1928	267	60.82%	172	39.18%	0	0.00%
1932	154	35.16%	258	58.90%	26	5.94%
1936	177	32.78%	363	67.22%	0	0.00%
1940	113	28.61%	280	70.89%	2	0.51%
1944	179	30.76%	402	69.07%	1	0.17%
1948	234	41.56%	297	52.75%	32	5.68%
1952	513	56.62%	392	43.27%	1	0.11%
1956	545	60.76%	326	36.34%	26	2.90%
1960	487	53.05%	427	46.51%	4	0.44%
1964	459	39.81%	691	59.93%	3	0.26%
1968	814	49.04%	387	23.31%	459	27.65%
1972	990	70.26%	373	26.47%	46	3.26%
1976	771	41.61%	993	53.59%	89	4.80%
1980	942	45.09%	1,031	49.35%	116	5.55%
1984	1,335	64.40%	724	34.93%	14	0.68%
1988	1,121	56.08%	828	41.42%	50	2.50%
1992	849	38.59%	1,023	46.50%	328	14.91%
1996	713	34.66%	1,090	52.99%	254	12.35%
2000	980	49.62%	941	47.65%	54	2.73%
2004	1,417	59.31%	936	39.18%	36	1.51%
2008	1,282	52.91%	1,108	45.73%	33	1.36%
2012	1,564	61.92%	919	36.38%	43	1.70%
2016	1,430	59.41%	693	28.79%	284	11.80%
2020	1,863	67.11%	825	29.72%	88	3.17%
2024	2,035	70.98%	767	26.75%	65	2.27%

== See also ==
- National Register of Historic Places listings in Buena Vista, Virginia
