= Lafayette Elementary School (Lafayette, Louisiana) =

- U.S. National Register of Historic Places
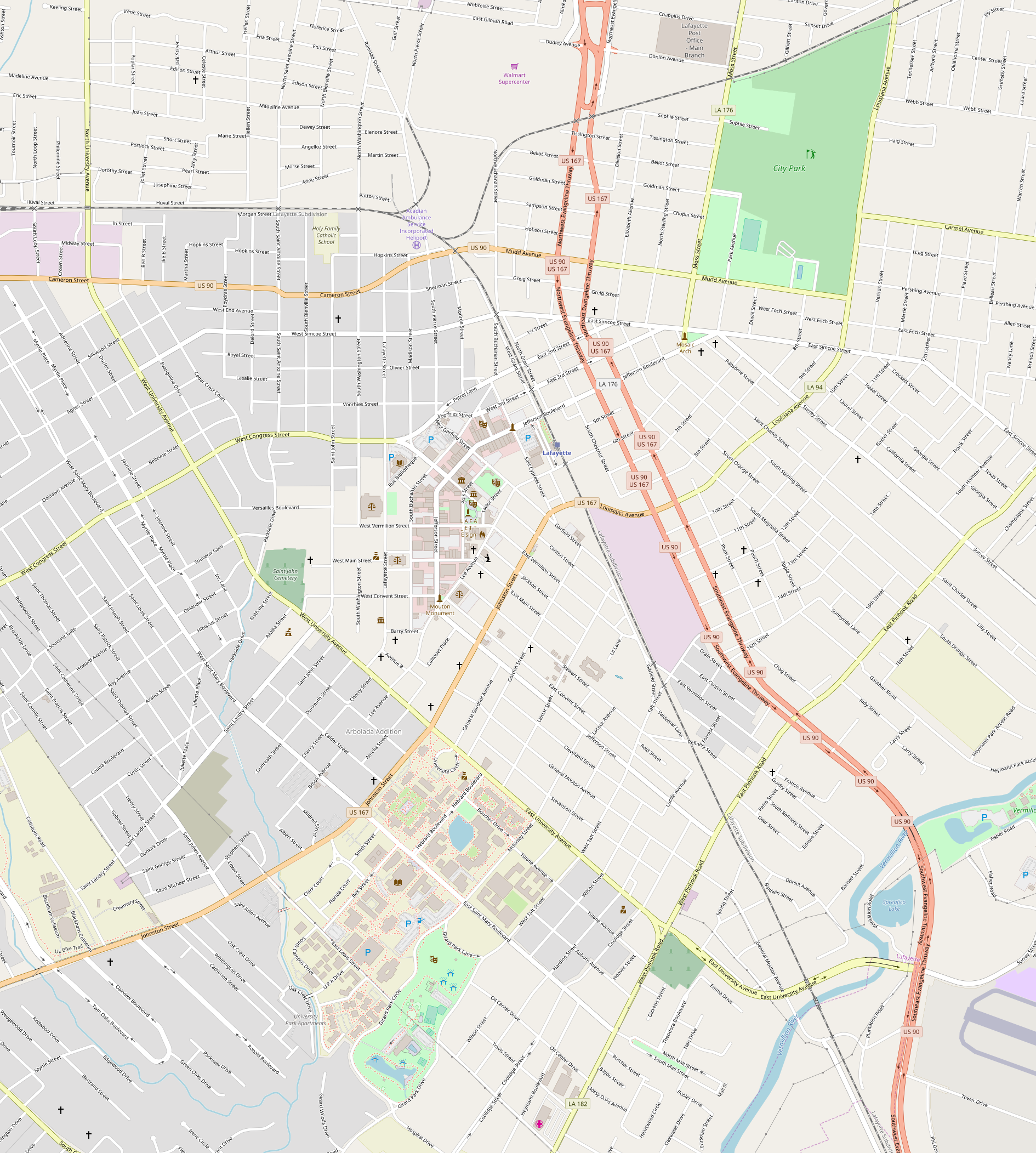
- Location within Lafayette
- Location: 1301 West University Avenue, Lafayette, Louisiana
- Coordinates: 30°13′29″N 92°01′41″W
- Area: 2.5 acres (1.0 ha)
- Built: 1926
- Architect: William T. Nolan
- Architectural style: Gothic Revival
- NRHP reference No.: 84001308
- Added to NRHP: June 14, 1984

The Lafayette Elementary School in Lafayette, Louisiana, United States, (formerly Lafayette Middle School) is a historic school building located at 1301 West University Avenue.

Built in 1926 and designed by William T. Nolan, the two-story Gothic Revival institutional building is a brick and concrete E-shaped structure with a long frontal main block and three rear wings.

The building was listed on the National Register of Historic Places on June 14, 1984.

== See also ==
- National Register of Historic Places listings in Lafayette Parish, Louisiana
