= Buena Vista Downtown Historic District =

Historic district in Virginia, United States

- U.S. National Register of Historic Places
- U.S. Historic district
- Virginia Landmarks Register
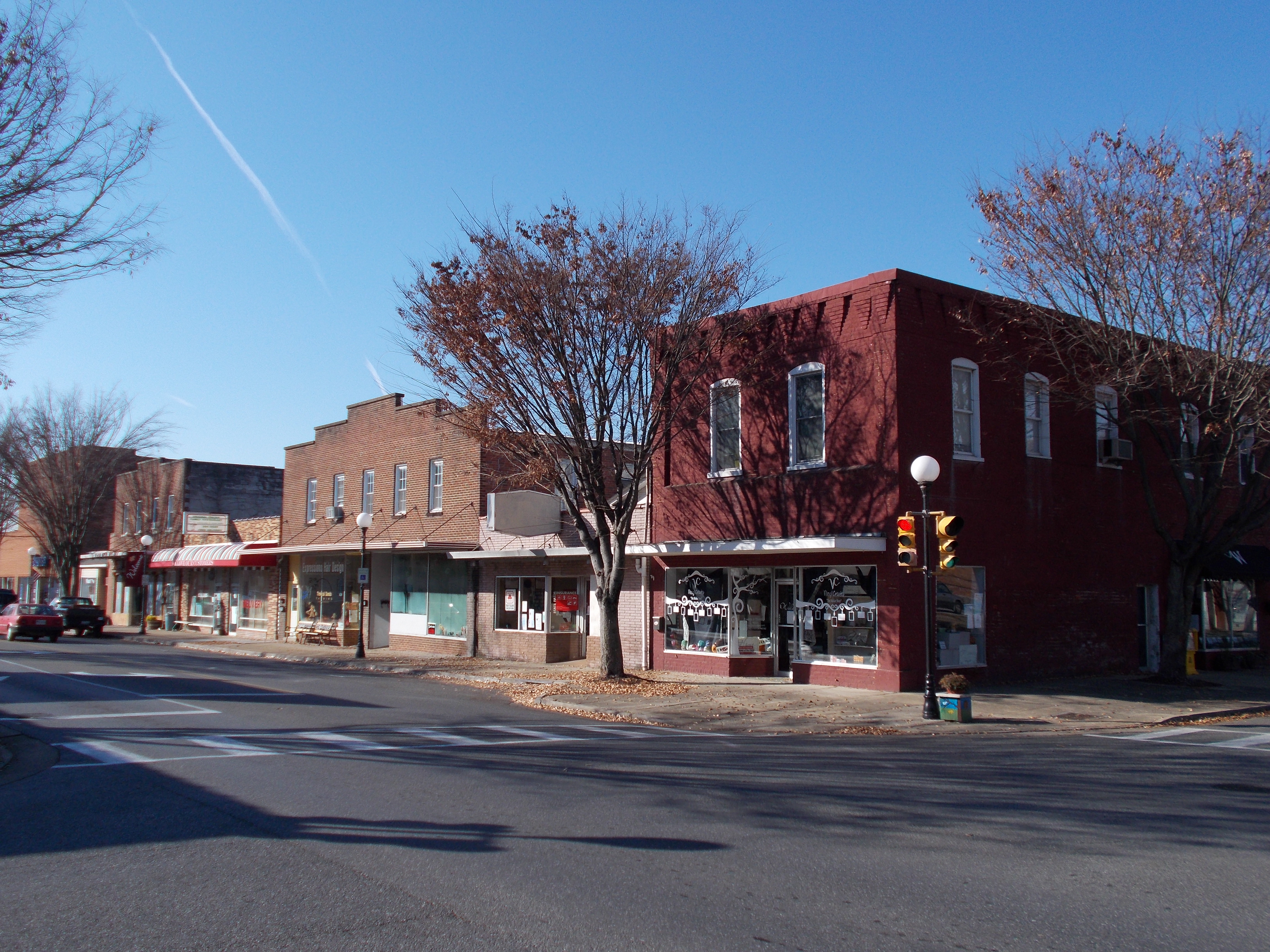
- Buena Vista Downtown Historic District, November 2012

- Location within Virginia Location within the United States
- Location: 2000 & 2100 blocks of Magnolia Ave. and adjacent blocks, Buena Vista, Virginia
- Coordinates: 37°43′58″N 79°21′17″W
- Area: 10 acres (4.0 ha)
- Built: 1889
- Architect: Wetmore, James A.
- Architectural style: Second Empire, Classical Revival
- NRHP reference No.: 09000792
- VLR No.: 103-5055

Significant dates
- Added to NRHP: September 30, 2009
- Designated VLR: June 18, 2009

Buena Vista Downtown Historic District is a national historic district located at Buena Vista, Virginia. The district encompasses 38 contributing buildings and 1 contributing structure in the central business district of Buena Vista. The buildings are primarily one- and two-story masonry structures, with the earliest built in 1889–1890. Notable buildings include the Buena Vista Post Office (1930), Buena Vista War Memorial Building (1954), Peoples Bank of Buena Vista (1907), Dickinson Building (c. 1907), Royer's Restaurant (c. 1940), the Advocate Building (1889), Buena Vista Masonic Building (c. 1910), and the Valley Steam Laundry Building (c. 1905). The Buena Vista Company Building (1890) is separately listed as the Old Courthouse.

It was listed on the National Register of Historic Places in 2009.
