= Southern Seminary Main Building =

Historic academic building in Virginia, US

- U.S. National Register of Historic Places
- Virginia Landmarks Register
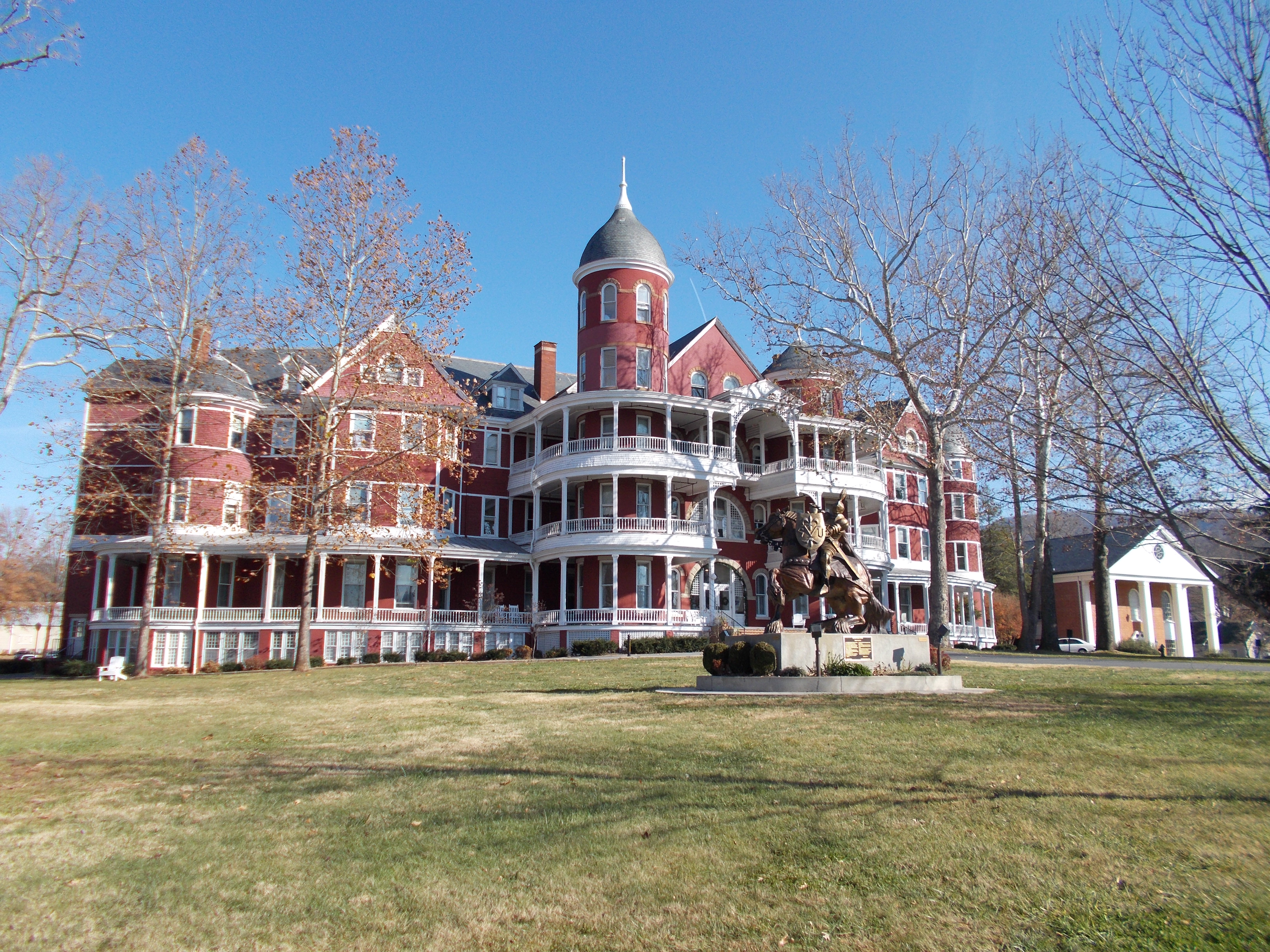
- Southern Seminary Main Building, November 2012

- Location within Virginia Location within the United States
- Location: Jct. of Ivy and Park Aves., Buena Vista, Virginia
- Coordinates: 37°44′24″N 79°21′2″W
- Area: 9.9 acres (4.0 ha)
- Built: 1890
- Architect: Foulks, S.W.
- Architectural style: Renaissance, Queen Anne, French Renaissance
- NRHP reference No.: 72001501
- VLR No.: 103-0002

Significant dates
- Added to NRHP: April 13, 1972
- Designated VLR: December 21, 1971

Southern Seminary Main Building, originally known as the Hotel Buena Vista and now Main Hall of Southern Virginia University, is a historic hotel building located at Buena Vista, Virginia. It was built in 1890, and is a 3 1/2-story, brick and frame building in an eclectic combination of Queen Anne and French Renaissance style architecture. It features a steep slate covered gable roof, round towers with conical and domical roofs, three-level wooden galleries, and Palladian windows. By 1907, the building was known as the Southern Seminary Main Building, after consolidation of three campuses of that school.

It was listed on the National Register of Historic Places in 1972.
