= Buena Vista Colored School =

Historic school in Virginia, US

- U.S. National Register of Historic Places
- Virginia Landmarks Register
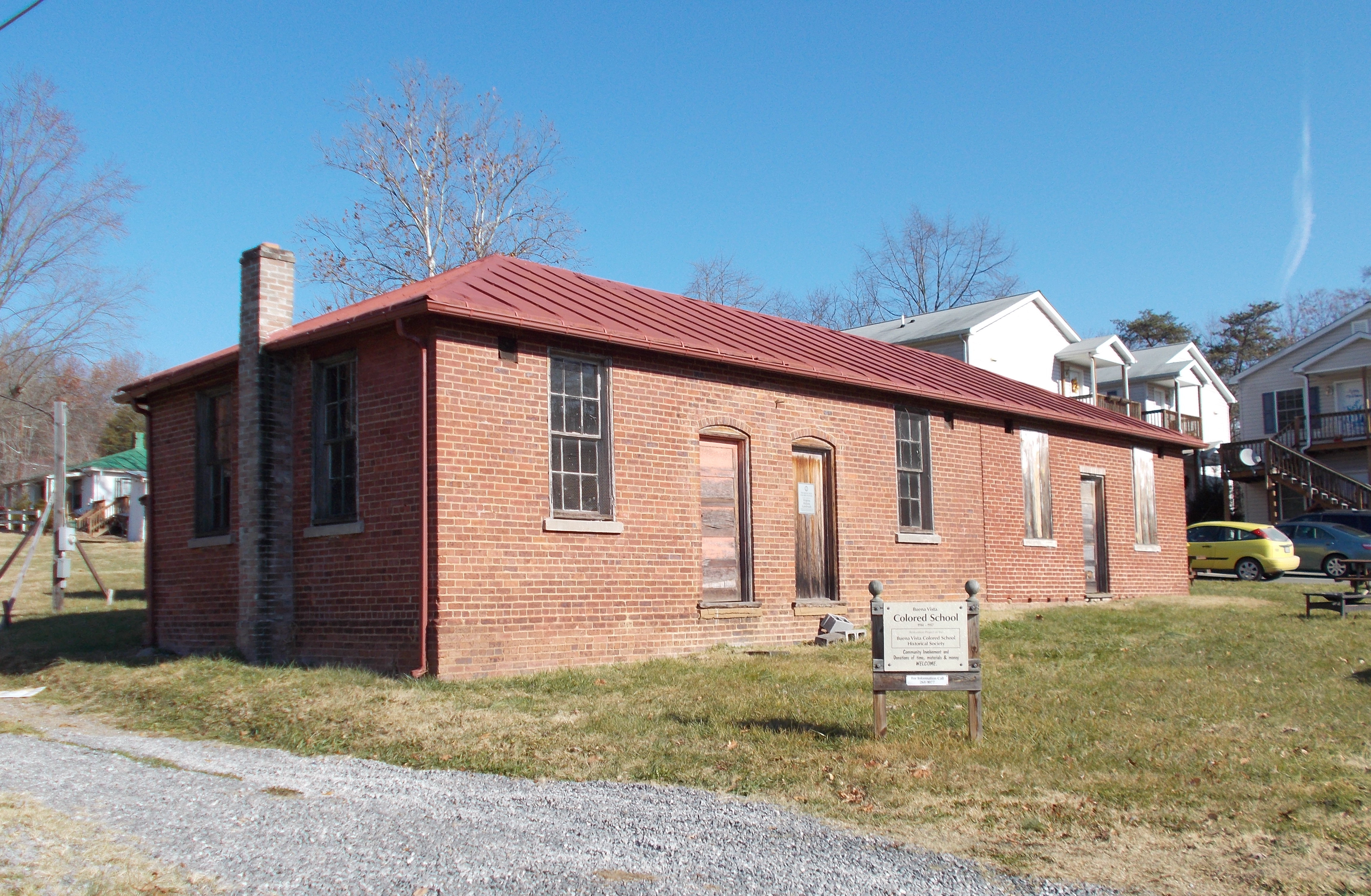
- Buena Vista Colored School, November 2012

- Location within Virginia Location within the United States
- Location: 30th St. and Aspen Ave., Buena Vista, Virginia
- Coordinates: 37°44′39.3″N 79°21′11.2″W
- Area: less than one acre
- Architectural style: brick school house
- NRHP reference No.: 03000191
- VLR No.: 103-5053

Significant dates
- Added to NRHP: April 2, 2003
- Designated VLR: December 4, 2002

Buena Vista Colored School is a historic school building for African American children located at Buena Vista, Virginia. It was built in 1914, and expanded in 1926. It is a one-story, brick structure with a hipped, sheet metal roof. Also on the property is a contributing brick outbuilding once used to store wood and coal. The building served as the only local school for African American children in grades 1–7 from 1914 to 1957. The Buena Vista Colored School Historical Society was organized in 2002 to restore the school as a museum and community center.

It was listed on the National Register of Historic Places in 2003.

== See also ==
- Buena Vista Colored School Historical Society http://buenavistacoloredschool.com/index.html
