= Jonas Henderson High School =

School in New Iberia, Louisiana

Coordinates: 29.9987°N 91.8572°W

- Anderson Street, New Iberia, Iberia Parish, Louisiana, United States

Information
- Former name: New Iberia Colored High School
- School type: Black public high school
- Opened: January 9, 1950
- Closed: June 1969
- Principal: J.B. Henderson
- Succeeded by: New Iberia Freshman High School

Jonas Henderson High School (1950–1969), was a public high school for African American students in New Iberia, Louisiana, United States, during a time of racial segregation.

== History ==
The school was opened on January 9, 1950, on Anderson Street, and was planned to be named New Iberia Colored High School. At the time of opening the name was changed to "Jonas Henderson High School" to honor local teacher, Jonas Henderson Sr. (1890–1933) who taught at Howe Institute (c. 1893 to 1933), a former private African American Baptist school. The principal at Jonas Henderson High School was J.B. Henderson (or John Berry Henderson; 1913–2006), the son of the school namesake.

Jonas Henderson High School remained on Anderson Street until the educational program expanded and became too large for its present facilities. In 1967 the new Jonas Henderson High School campus was opened on Jefferson Island Road.

The last graduating class was in c. June 1969, and in July 1969 the school district announced its closure. After the school closure in August 1969, a group of Black students protested and marched back to the former campus; they were met by police with tear gas, an event which made national news. Iberia Parish became integrated in September 1969, and the Jonas Henderson High School campus became known as New Iberia Freshman High School (or Freshman High School), and later known as Westgate High School.

== See also ==
- African Americans in Louisiana
- List of high schools in Louisiana
