= National Register of Historic Places listings in St. Louis north and west of downtown =

This is a list of properties and historic districts on the National Register of Historic Places within the city limits of St. Louis, Missouri, north of Interstate 64 and west of Downtown St. Louis. For listings in Downtown St. Louis, see National Register of Historic Places listings in Downtown and Downtown West St. Louis. For those south of I-64 and west of downtown, see National Register of Historic Places listings in St. Louis south and west of downtown. For listings in St. Louis County and outside the city limits of St. Louis, see National Register of Historic Places listings in St. Louis County, Missouri.

== Current listings ==
	Name on the Register	Image	Date listed	Location	Description
1	1907 Dorris Motor Car Company Building	1907 Dorris Motor Car Company Building	February 10, 2000 (#00000084)	4063–4065 Forest Park Ave. 38°38′10″N 90°14′48″W	
2	5882 Cabanne Courtyard Apartment Building	5882 Cabanne Courtyard Apartment Building	June 27, 2014 (#14000380)	5882 Cabanne Ave. 38°39′33″N 90°17′21″W	
3	A & P Food Stores Building	A & P Food Stores Building	October 15, 2000 (#00001171)	6016, 6014, and 6018 Delmar; 38°39′16″N 90°17′41″W	
4	ABC Auto Sales and Investment Company Building	ABC Auto Sales and Investment Company Building	November 14, 2012 (#12000925)	3509–3527 Page Boulevard; 38°38′45″N 90°13′35″W	
5	American Brake Company Building	American Brake Company Building	March 21, 2007 (#07000172)	1920 N. Broadway; 38°38′53″N 90°11′13″W	
6	Antioch Baptist Church	Antioch Baptist Church	September 17, 1999 (#99001166)	4213 N. Market St. 38°39′35″N 90°14′17″W	
7	Apartments at 5561–71 Chamberlain	Apartments at 5561–71 Chamberlain	August 24, 2011 (#11000587)	5561–5571 Chamberlain; 38°39′42″N 90°16′47″W	
8	Arlington School	Arlington School	April 16, 2008 (#08000311)	1617 Burd Ave. 38°40′15″N 90°16′26″W	
9	Aubert Place	Aubert Place	September 30, 1982 (#82004730)	Fountain Ave. between Walton Ave. and the Kings Highway; 38°39′19″N 90°15′34″W	
10	Autocar Sales and Service Building	Autocar Sales and Service Building	June 26, 2006 (#06000530)	2745 Locust; 38°38′07″N 90°13′04″W	
11	Baden School	Baden School	September 26, 2022 (#100008201)	8724 Halls Ferry Rd. 38°43′03″N 90°14′12″W	
12	Banneker School	Banneker School	October 23, 2017 (#100001761)	2840 Samuel Shepard Dr. 38°38′13″N 90°13′07″W	
13	Beaumont Medical Building	Beaumont Medical Building	January 19, 1984 (#84002615)	3714–3726 Washington Ave. 38°38′24″N 90°14′04″W	Imploded, April 26, 1997.
14	Beaumont Telephone Exchange Building	Beaumont Telephone Exchange Building	February 16, 2006 (#06000038)	2654 Locust St. 38°38′04″N 90°12′58″W	
15	Beckley-Ralston Company	Beckley-Ralston Company	December 2, 2016 (#15000197)	3306–3314 Washington Blvd. 38°38′16″N 90°13′36″W	
16	Bel Air Motel	Bel Air Motel	May 1, 2009 (#09000253)	4630 Lindell; 38°38′33″N 90°15′39″W	
17	Bellefontaine Cemetery	Bellefontaine Cemetery	July 3, 2014 (#14000378)	4947 W. Florissant Ave. 38°41′51″N 90°14′01″W	
18	Chuck Berry House	Chuck Berry House	December 12, 2008 (#08001179)	3137 Whittier St. 38°39′52″N 90°13′53″W	
19	Biddle Street Market	Biddle Street Market	June 1, 2015 (#15000304)	1211–19 N. Tucker Blvd. 38°38′15″N 90°11′42″W	
20	Bissell Street Water Tower	Bissell Street Water Tower	June 5, 1970 (#70000906)	Junction of Bissell St. and Blair Ave. 38°40′13″N 90°12′21″W	
21	Frank P. Blair School	Frank P. Blair School	February 10, 1983 (#83001041)	2707 Rauschenbach Ave. 38°39′03″N 90°12′18″W	
22	Blind Girls' Home	Blind Girls' Home	August 23, 1984 (#84002617)	5235 Page Boulevard; 38°39′38″N 90°16′09″W	
23	Block Unit No. 1 Historic District	Block Unit No. 1 Historic District	July 14, 2000 (#00000794)	4100–4191 Enright Ave. 38°38′55″N 90°14′36″W	
24	Dr. George Ashe Bronson House	Dr. George Ashe Bronson House	June 2, 2015 (#15000305)	3201 Washington St. 38°38′15″N 90°13′30″W	
25	Building at 3910–12 Laclede Ave.	Building at 3910–12 Laclede Ave.	May 30, 2003 (#03000478)	3910–3912 Laclede Ave. 38°38′16″N 90°14′33″W	
26	Buster Brown Blue Ribbon Shoe Factory	Buster Brown Blue Ribbon Shoe Factory	January 26, 2005 (#04001560)	1526 N. Jefferson Ave. 38°38′51″N 90°12′45″W	Demolished
27	Butler House	Butler House	September 2, 1982 (#82004733)	4484 W. Pine Boulevard; 38°38′26″N 90°15′28″W	
28	Cadillac Automobile Company Building	Cadillac Automobile Company Building	August 4, 2005 (#05000812)	3224 Locust St. 38°38′12″N 90°13′35″W	
29	Carr School	Carr School	December 13, 2000 (#00001512)	1419 Carr St. 38°38′20″N 90°11′54″W	
30	Cass Bank and Trust Company	Cass Bank and Trust Company	February 14, 2011 (#11000012)	1450 N. 13th St. 38°38′27″N 90°11′38″W	
31	Castle Ballroom	Castle Ballroom	February 18, 2011 (#11000024)	2839–2845 Olive St. 38°38′03″N 90°13′10″W	Demolished in 2014
32	Central High School	Central High School	October 17, 2012 (#12000873)	3616 Garrison; 38°39′35″N 90°12′55″W	Used from 1927 to 2004 by what is now the Central VPA High School
33	Central Institute for the Deaf Building	Central Institute for the Deaf Building	September 1, 2015 (#15000554)	800 S. Euclid Ave. 38°37′58″N 90°15′48″W	
34	Central States Life Insurance Company Building	Central States Life Insurance Company Building	July 25, 2012 (#12000436)	3207 Washington Boulevard; 38°38′16″N 90°13′31″W	
35	Century Electric Foundry Complex	Century Electric Foundry Complex	November 2, 2016 (#16000750)	3711–3739, 3815R Market St., 3700–3800 Forest Park Ave. 38°38′00″N 90°14′24″W	
36	Chain of Rocks Bridge	Chain of Rocks Bridge	December 1, 2006 (#06001091)	West Chain of Rocks Rd. 38°45′41″N 90°10′26″W	
37	Kate Chopin House	Kate Chopin House	February 14, 1986 (#86000209)	4232 McPherson Ave. 38°38′35″N 90°14′56″W	
38	Chouteau Apartments/Parkway Dwellings	Chouteau Apartments/Parkway Dwellings	February 10, 1983 (#83001043)	4937–4943 Laclede Ave. 38°38′26″N 90°15′49″W	
39	Church of the Messiah	Church of the Messiah	February 13, 2013 (#13000005)	5261 Enright Ave. 38°39′14″N 90°16′22″W	
40	Winston Churchill Apartments	Winston Churchill Apartments	April 4, 1985 (#85000697)	5475 Cabanne; 38°39′32″N 90°16′35″W	
41	Clemens House-Columbia Brewery District	Clemens House-Columbia Brewery District	July 19, 1984 (#84002622)	Roughly bounded by Maiden Lane, Cass Ave., 21st, Helen, and Howard Sts.; also roughly bounded by St. Louis Ave., N. Florissant Ave., Maiden Ln., and N. 21st and N. 20th Sts; 38°38′41″N 90°12′33″W	Second set of boundaries represents a boundary increase of July 22, 1986
42	Colchester Apartments	Colchester Apartments	July 12, 2006 (#06000603)	4–10-14-20 N. Kingshighway Boulevard; 38°38′27″N 90°15′53″W	
43	Cook Avenue Methodist Episcopal Church, South	Cook Avenue Methodist Episcopal Church, South	August 27, 2008 (#08000806)	3680 Cook Ave. 38°38′45″N 90°13′50″W	
44	Cook School	Cook School	January 14, 2022 (#100007360)	5935 Horton Pl. 38°39′45″N 90°17′24″W	
45	Cote Brilliante Avenue in The Ville Historic District	Cote Brilliante Avenue in The Ville Historic District	January 17, 2012 (#11001021)	4200 W. block of Cote Brilliante Ave. and the 1700 block of Annie Malone Dr. 38°39′21″N 90°14′23″W	
46	Cotton Belt Freight Depot	Cotton Belt Freight Depot	April 21, 2004 (#04000344)	1400 N. 1st St. 38°38′27″N 90°10′57″W	
47	Council Plaza	Council Plaza	March 2, 2007 (#06000217)	212, 300, and 310 S. Grand Boulevard; 38°37′57″N 90°14′04″W	
48	Crunden Branch Library	Crunden Branch Library	April 20, 2018 (#100002334)	2008 Cass Ave. 38°38′37″N 90°12′21″W	
49	Samuel Cupples House	Samuel Cupples House	October 21, 1976 (#76002260)	3673 W. Pine Boulevard; 38°38′12″N 90°14′08″W	
50	S.S. Cyril and Methodius Historic District	S.S. Cyril and Methodius Historic District	June 28, 1982 (#82004740)	Interstate 70; 38°38′44″N 90°11′29″W	
51	De Hodiamont Car House Historic District	De Hodiamont Car House Historic District	February 10, 2005 (#05000012)	Bounded by N. Skinker Parkway, Horton Place, and the Wabash railroad tracks 38°39′45″N 90°17′45″W	
52	Emmanuel DeHodiamont House	Emmanuel DeHodiamont House	January 15, 2003 (#02001708)	951 Maple Place; 38°39′40″N 90°17′32″W	
53	Delmar Loop-Parkview Gardens Historic District	Delmar Loop-Parkview Gardens Historic District	February 16, 1984 (#84002624)	Roughly bounded by Kingsland Ave., North Dr., Delmar Boulevard, and Eastgate; 38°39′21″N 90°18′15″W	
54	DePaul Hospital	DePaul Hospital	March 29, 1983 (#83001045)	2415 N. Kingshighway Boulevard; 38°40′05″N 90°15′32″W	
55	Dorris Motor Car Company Building	Dorris Motor Car Company Building	May 1, 1986 (#86000883)	4100 Laclede; 38°38′12″N 90°14′49″W	
56	Dr. Herman S. Dreer House	Dr. Herman S. Dreer House	February 20, 2009 (#09000035)	4335 Cote Brilliante Ave. 38°39′29″N 90°14′36″W	
57	The Edge of the Ville Integration Historic District		January 29, 2026 (#100012648)	4068-4281 Kennerly Ave, 4069 Lincoln Ave, 4065-4282 Maffitt Ave, 2715 & 2811 Sarah St., 4068-4317 St. Louis Ave, 2701-2817 Whittier St. 38°39′32″N 90°13′56″W	
58	Eliot School	Eliot School	September 2, 1992 (#92001092)	4242 Grove; 38°39′59″N 90°12′31″W	
59	Ralph Waldo Emerson School	Ralph Waldo Emerson School	September 2, 1992 (#92001145)	5415 Page Boulevard; 38°39′51″N 90°16′39″W	
60	Joseph Erlanger House	Joseph Erlanger House	December 8, 1976 (#76002234)	5127 Waterman Boulevard; 38°38′55″N 90°16′04″W	
61	Fairgrounds Hotel	Fairgrounds Hotel	July 19, 2002 (#02000796)	3644 Natural Bridge Ave. 38°39′42″N 90°13′06″W	
62	Falstaff Brewing Corporation Plant Number 1	Falstaff Brewing Corporation Plant Number 1	July 12, 2007 (#07000008)	3644–3690 Forest Park Boulevard; 38°38′08″N 90°14′15″W	
63	Father Dunne's News Boys' Home and Protectorate	Father Dunne's News Boys' Home and Protectorate	August 12, 2010 (#10000550)	3010 Washington Ave. 38°38′13″N 90°13′22″W	
64	Federal Cold Storage Company Building	Federal Cold Storage Company Building	January 12, 2010 (#09001226)	1800–1828 N. Broadway; 38°38′41″N 90°11′09″W	Demolished
65	Eugene Field School	Eugene Field School	September 2, 1992 (#92001093)	4466 Olive St. 38°38′53″N 90°15′15″W	
66	Forest Park Headquarters Building	Forest Park Headquarters Building	June 11, 1986 (#86001300)	115 Union, Forest Park; 38°38′40″N 90°16′31″W	
67	Forest Park Hotel	Forest Park Hotel	March 22, 1984 (#84002632)	4910 W. Pine Boulevard; 38°38′29″N 90°15′44″W	
68	Forty-Eleven Delmar	Forty-Eleven Delmar	February 28, 2008 (#08000092)	4005–4017 Delmar Boulevard; 38°38′45″N 90°14′19″W	
69	Fox Theater	Fox Theater	October 8, 1976 (#76002261)	527 N. Grand Boulevard; 38°38′19″N 90°13′55″W	
70	Fullerton's Westminster Place	Fullerton's Westminster Place	April 10, 1980 (#80004506)	Fullerton Place (4300 and 4400 blocks on Westminster Place); 38°38′43″N 90°15′07″W	
71	Gerhart Block	Gerhart Block	May 30, 2003 (#03000477)	3900–3908 Laclede Ave., 1–17 Vandeventer; 38°38′16″N 90°14′31″W	
72	Goodfellow-Julian Concrete Block District	Goodfellow-Julian Concrete Block District	August 13, 1987 (#87001389)	Roughly bounded by Julian Ave., Blackstone, and Goodfellow Boulevard; 38°39′52″N 90°17′01″W	
73	Goodwill Building	Goodwill Building	February 25, 2021 (#100006165)	4140 Forest Park Ave. 38°38′10″N 90°14′57″W	
74	Grand Avenue Water Tower	Grand Avenue Water Tower	June 15, 1970 (#70000908)	Junction of E. Grand Ave. and 20th St. 38°40′13″N 90°12′31″W	
75	Philip and Louisa Green House	Philip and Louisa Green House	November 2, 2015 (#15000761)	4171 W. Belle Place; 38°38′54″N 90°14′35″W	Demolished
76	Edwin F. Guth Company Complex	Edwin F. Guth Company Complex	July 28, 2004 (#04000748)	2615 Washington Ave. 38°38′07″N 90°12′50″W	
77	Hamilton Hotel	Hamilton Hotel	April 29, 2011 (#11000248)	956 Hamilton Ave. 38°39′40″N 90°17′21″W	
78	Hamilton Place Historic District	Hamilton Place Historic District	October 15, 2005 (#05001164)	5900–6000 blocks of Enright, Cates, and Clemens; 38°39′26″N 90°17′33″W	
79	Harrison School	Harrison School	July 18, 2007 (#07000703)	4224 Fair Ave. 38°40′28″N 90°13′26″W	
80	Hempstead School	Hempstead School	July 3, 2007 (#07000653)	5872 Minerva Ave. 38°40′09″N 90°17′04″W	
81	Heritage House	Heritage House	October 3, 2024 (#100010879)	2800 Olive Street; 38°38′02″N 90°13′07″W	
82	Hi-Pointe-De Mun Historic District	Hi-Pointe-De Mun Historic District	May 7, 2005 (#05000370)	Roughly bounded by S. Skinker Boulevard, Clayton Rd., Seminary Place, De Mun Ave., and Northwood Ave.; also roughly bounded by Clayton Rd., De Mun Ave., San Bonita Ave., and Big Bend Boulevard; 38°38′14″N 90°18′31″W	Second set of boundaries represents a boundary increase of March 22, 2007
83	Holly Place Historic District	Holly Place Historic District	July 18, 2007 (#07000704)	4500 block of Holly Place; 38°40′39″N 90°13′35″W	
84	Holy Corners Historic District	Holy Corners Historic District	December 29, 1975 (#75002138)	Both sides of Kings Highway between and including Westminster Pl. and Washington Ave. 38°38′59″N 90°15′49″W	
85	Holy Cross Parish District	Holy Cross Parish District	March 27, 1980 (#80004507)	8115 Church Rd. 38°42′36″N 90°13′58″W	
86	Jack Rabbit Candy Company Building	Jack Rabbit Candy Company Building	February 9, 2007 (#07000024)	1928–1930 Martin Luther King; 38°38′17″N 90°12′24″W	
87	Jackson School	Jackson School	September 2, 1992 (#92001094)	1632 Hogan St. 38°38′41″N 90°12′03″W	
88	Jefferson-Cass Health Center	Jefferson-Cass Health Center	August 24, 2018 (#100002792)	1421 N Jefferson Ave. 38°38′41″N 90°12′46″W	
89	Jewel Box	Jewel Box	March 14, 2000 (#00000147)	Junction of Wells Dr. and McKinley Dr., Forest Park; 38°38′07″N 90°16′46″W	
90	William Cuthbert Jones House	William Cuthbert Jones House	February 7, 2007 (#07000017)	3724 Olive St. 38°38′29″N 90°14′12″W	
91	Scott Joplin House	Scott Joplin House	December 8, 1976 (#76002235)	2658 Delmar Boulevard; 38°38′14″N 90°12′53″W	
92	Frederick Newton Judson House	Frederick Newton Judson House	April 30, 2008 (#08000360)	3733 Washington Ave. 38°38′27″N 90°14′03″W	
93	Kellerman Motor Car Company	Kellerman Motor Car Company	May 5, 2015 (#15000198)	3318–3322 Washington Blvd. 38°38′16″N 90°13′37″W	
94	Otto Kulage House	Otto Kulage House	May 10, 2002 (#02000467)	1904 E. College Ave. 38°40′40″N 90°12′46″W	
95	William A. Lange Subdivision	William A. Lange Subdivision	July 14, 2011 (#11000444)	4101–4235 Florissant Ave., 4128–4150 Glasgow Ave., 2141–2325 Angelica St., and 4111–4220 N. 22nd St. 38°39′58″N 90°12′32″W	
96	Leonardo	Leonardo	August 11, 1983 (#83001048)	4166 Lindell Boulevard; 38°38′24″N 90°14′53″W	
97	Lewis Place Historic District	Lewis Place Historic District	September 15, 1980 (#80004509)	Lewis Pl. 38°39′16″N 90°15′14″W	
98	Lindell Park Subdivision Historic District	Lindell Park Subdivision Historic District	February 5, 2013 (#12001256)	Bounded by N. Grand Boulevard and Natural Bridge, Glasgow, and St. Louis Aves. 38°39′26″N 90°13′02″W	
99	Lister Building	Lister Building	February 10, 1983 (#83004298)	4500 Olive St. 38°39′24″N 90°15′18″W	
100	Locust Street Automotive District	Locust Street Automotive District	September 15, 2005 (#05001024)	2914–3124 Locust and 3043 Olive; Boundary increase 1: 3133–3207 and 3150–3202 Locust St. Boundary increase 2: 2722–2900 Locust St., 2727–2801 Locust St. 38°38′15″N 90°13′21″W	
101	Louise Apartments	Louise Apartments	August 23, 1984 (#84002651)	3900 Lindell Boulevard and Vandeventer Ave. 38°38′18″N 90°14′29″W	
102	Lowell School	Lowell School	May 24, 2007 (#07000464)	1409 E. Linton; 38°40′38″N 90°12′32″W	
103	Luyties Homeopathic Pharmacy Company Building	Luyties Homeopathic Pharmacy Company Building	March 27, 2003 (#02001442)	4200 Laclede Ave. 38°38′21″N 90°14′58″W	
104	Marshall School	Marshall School	September 17, 1999 (#99001162)	4342 Aldine Ave. 38°39′31″N 90°14′38″W	
105	Marshall School Neighborhood in The Ville Historic District	Marshall School Neighborhood in The Ville Historic District	January 17, 2012 (#11001022)	Parts of the 4300 blocks of Aldine and Cote Brilliante Aves. and the 1500 and 1700 blocks of Billups Ave. 38°39′27″N 90°14′36″W	
106	Mavrakos Candy Company		July 24, 2024 (#100010556)	4709-4717 Delmar Blvd. 38°39′04″N 90°15′30″W	
107	William Cullen McBride Catholic High School	William Cullen McBride Catholic High School	January 29, 2008 (#07001493)	1909–1915 N. Kingshighway Boulevard; 38°39′57″N 90°15′35″W	
108	Measuregraph Company Building	Measuregraph Company Building	October 14, 2005 (#05001163)	4245 Forest Park Boulevard; 38°38′16″N 90°15′01″W	
109	Medart's	Medart's	April 22, 2011 (#09000410)	7036 Clayton Ave. 38°37′59″N 90°18′22″W	Site was originally listed in June 2009, but was removed from the Register August 16, 2010. Site was returned to the Register in April 2011.
110	Melrose Apartments	Melrose Apartments	April 18, 2007 (#07000324)	4065 W. Pine Boulevard; 38°38′26″N 90°15′00″W	
111	Metropolitan Police Garage	Metropolitan Police Garage	October 9, 2020 (#100005664)	3919 Laclede Ave. 38°38′11″N 90°14′34″W	
112	Midtown Historic District	Midtown Historic District	July 7, 1978 (#78003392)	Lindell and Grand Boulevards; 38°38′19″N 90°14′09″W	
113	More Automobile Company Building	More Automobile Company Building	December 3, 2008 (#08001130)	2801 Locust St. 38°38′07″N 90°13′05″W	
114	Mount Cabanne-Raymond Place Historic District	Mount Cabanne-Raymond Place Historic District	September 13, 2002 (#02000984)	Roughly bounded by Kingshighway, Page, Union, and Delmar Boulevards; 38°39′23″N 90°16′03″W	
115	Mullanphy Historic District	Mullanphy Historic District	February 14, 1983 (#83001051)	N. 14th St. between Mullanphy and Howard and N. 13th between Howard and Tyler; 38°38′36″N 90°11′40″W	
116	Murphy-Blair District	Murphy-Blair District	January 26, 1984 (#84002658)	Roughly bounded by Interstate 70, Florissant Ave., and Chambers and Branch Sts. 38°39′01″N 90°11′49″W	
117	Negro Masonic Hall	Negro Masonic Hall	April 15, 1993 (#93000262)	3615–3619 Dr. Martin Luther King Boulevard; 38°38′49″N 90°13′37″W	Demolished after a 1995 fire.
118	Neighborhood Gardens Apartments	Neighborhood Gardens Apartments	January 31, 1986 (#86000143)	1205 N. 7th St. 38°38′12″N 90°11′20″W	
119	North Broadway Glass and Plow Warehouse District	North Broadway Glass and Plow Warehouse District	November 14, 2012 (#12000928)	2500–2522, 2600–2614 N. Broadway; 38°39′06″N 90°11′24″W	
120	North Broadway Wholesale and Warehouse District	North Broadway Wholesale and Warehouse District	June 18, 2010 (#10000352)	1400–1600 and 1609–1629 North Broadway; 38°38′25″N 90°11′09″W	
121	North Riverfront Industrial Historic District	North Riverfront Industrial Historic District	May 1, 2003 (#03000320)	Roughly bounded by Dickson, Lewis, O'Fallon, 2nd, Ashley, Biddle, and the Mississippi River; 38°38′18″N 90°10′55″W	
122	Oakherst Place Concrete Block District	Oakherst Place Concrete Block District	May 5, 1987 (#87000642)	Roughly bounded by Julian, Oakley, Plymouth, and Oakherst; 38°40′01″N 90°17′19″W	
123	Our Lady of Perpetual Help Parish Hall, School, Convent, and Rectory	Our Lady of Perpetual Help Parish Hall, School, Convent, and Rectory	November 5, 2009 (#09000890)	5217 N. 21st St. (parish hall), 2017 Linton Ave. (school and convent), and 2011 Linton Ave. (rectory); 38°40′27″N 90°12′49″W	
124	Armando Pacini Restaurant	Armando Pacini Restaurant	July 26, 2005 (#04001162)	8 S. Sarah St. 38°38′12″N 90°14′48″W	
125	Page Boulevard Police Station	Page Boulevard Police Station	September 11, 1980 (#80004504)	Page and Union Boulevards; 38°39′40″N 90°16′17″W	Demolished in 1995
126	Parkview Historic District	Parkview Historic District	March 14, 1986 (#86000788)	Roughly bounded by Delmar Ave., Skinker and Millbrook Boulevards, and Mellville Ave. 38°39′08″N 90°18′11″W	
127	D. L. Parrish Laundry Company Building	D. L. Parrish Laundry Company Building	January 28, 2004 (#03001506)	3100–3128 Olive St. 38°38′14″N 90°13′31″W	
128	Pendennis Club Apartment Building	Pendennis Club Apartment Building	July 16, 2008 (#08000665)	3737 Washington Ave. 38°38′26″N 90°14′02″W	
129	Homer G. Phillips Hospital	Homer G. Phillips Hospital	September 23, 1982 (#82004738)	2601 Whittier St. 38°39′31″N 90°14′07″W	
130	Homer G. Phillips House	Homer G. Phillips House	February 20, 2009 (#09000036)	4524 Cottage Ave. 38°39′46″N 90°14′44″W	
131	Plaza Hotel Complex	Plaza Hotel Complex	May 7, 1985 (#85001007)	307 N. Leonard, 3301-3321 Olive, 3300-3322 and 3339 Lindell, 3322-3334 Locust, and 308-310 Channing; 38°38′13″N 90°13′40″W	
132	Portland and Westmoreland Places	Portland and Westmoreland Places	February 12, 1974 (#74002276)	Northeastern corner of Forest Park; 38°38′48″N 90°16′10″W	
133	Principia Page-Park YMCA Gymnasium	Principia Page-Park YMCA Gymnasium	September 2, 1982 (#82004739)	5569 Minerva Ave. 38°39′46″N 90°16′23″W	
134	Pruitt School	Pruitt School	January 29, 2018 (#100002038)	1212 N 22nd St. 38°38′26″N 90°12′31″W	
135	Ramsey Accessories Manufacturing Corporation	Ramsey Accessories Manufacturing Corporation	April 16, 2008 (#07000813)	3693 Forest Park Boulevard; 38°38′03″N 90°14′15″W	
136	Remington Rand Building	Remington Rand Building	May 5, 2015 (#15000199)	4100 Lindell Blvd. 38°38′23″N 90°14′46″W	
137	Roberts Chevrolet	Roberts Chevrolet	June 22, 2007 (#07000617)	5875–91 Delmar Boulevard; 38°39′17″N 90°17′22″W	
138	Royal Tire Service Inc. Building	Royal Tire Service Inc. Building	June 22, 2007 (#07000616)	3229 Washington Ave. 38°38′17″N 90°13′33″W	
139	S. Pfeiffer Manufacturing Company Headquarters	S. Pfeiffer Manufacturing Company Headquarters	August 30, 2010 (#10000598)	3965 Laclede Ave. 38°38′13″N 90°14′39″W	
140	St. Augustine's Roman Catholic Church	St. Augustine's Roman Catholic Church	October 2, 1986 (#86002819)	3114 Lismore; 38°39′24″N 90°12′41″W	
141	St. Joseph's Roman Catholic Church	St. Joseph's Roman Catholic Church	May 19, 1978 (#78003396)	1220 N. 11th St. 38°38′14″N 90°11′33″W	
142	St. Liborius Church and Buildings	St. Liborius Church and Buildings	October 11, 1979 (#79003637)	1835 N. 18th St. 38°38′48″N 90°11′59″W	
143	St. Louis Colored Orphans Home	St. Louis Colored Orphans Home	September 17, 1999 (#99001164)	2612 Annie Malone Dr. 38°39′40″N 90°14′11″W	
144	St. Louis Stamping Company Buildings	St. Louis Stamping Company Buildings	November 10, 2009 (#09000902)	101 Cass Ave. 38°38′24″N 90°11′03″W	
145	St. Louis Theatre	St. Louis Theatre	May 25, 2001 (#01000545)	718 N. Grand Boulevard; 38°38′32″N 90°13′49″W	
146	St. Ferdinand Avenue in The Ville Historic District	St. Ferdinand Avenue in The Ville Historic District	January 17, 2012 (#11001023)	4200 W. block of St. Ferdinand Ave. 38°39′33″N 90°14′21″W	
147	St. Louis Place Historic District	St. Louis Place Historic District	August 31, 2011 (#11000617)	Roughly bounded by 21st, 22nd, 23rd, 25th, Benton, Montgomery, and N. Market Sts., and Rauschenbach and St. Louis Aves. 38°39′01″N 90°12′12″W	
148	St. Louis Post-Dispatch Rotogravure Printing Plant	St. Louis Post-Dispatch Rotogravure Printing Plant	February 23, 2016 (#16000032)	4340–50 Duncan Ave. 38°38′09″N 90°15′14″W	
149	St. Luke's Hospital Historic District	St. Luke's Hospital Historic District	April 20, 2018 (#100002335)	5535 Delmar Blvd. 38°39′13″N 90°16′49″W	
150	St. Luke's Plaza Apartments	St. Luke's Plaza Apartments	November 1, 2007 (#07001120)	5602–5629 Enright Ave. 38°39′18″N 90°16′58″W	
151	St. Mark the Evangelist Catholic Church, Convent and Academy	St. Mark the Evangelist Catholic Church, Convent and Academy	October 11, 2007 (#07001075)	1313 Academy Ave. and 5100 Minerva Ave. 38°39′46″N 90°15′59″W	
152	Saint Matthew's Parish Complex	Saint Matthew's Parish Complex	August 6, 1986 (#86002236)	Sarah and Kennerly; 38°39′32″N 90°13′57″W	
153	St. Stanislaus Kostka Church	St. Stanislaus Kostka Church	July 10, 1979 (#79003635)	1413 N. 20th St. 38°38′31″N 90°12′20″W	
154	Sanitol Building	Sanitol Building	October 21, 1985 (#85003362)	4252–4264 Laclede Ave. 38°38′16″N 90°15′04″W	
155	Savings Trust Company of St. Louis	Savings Trust Company of St. Louis	January 4, 2024 (#100009691)	4915 Delmar Blvd; 38°39′05″N 90°15′40″W	
156	Scudder Motor Truck Company Building	Scudder Motor Truck Company Building	April 24, 2012 (#12000233)	3942–3962 Laclede Ave. 38°38′11″N 90°14′38″W	
157	Second Presbyterian Church	Second Presbyterian Church	September 11, 1975 (#75002140)	4501 Westminster Pl. 38°38′51″N 90°15′20″W	
158	Ben J. Selkirk and Sons Building	Ben J. Selkirk and Sons Building	November 15, 2005 (#05001280)	4160–4166 Olive St. 38°38′45″N 90°14′47″W	
159	Shelley House	Shelley House	April 18, 1988 (#88000437)	4600 Labadie Ave. 38°40′00″N 90°14′38″W	
160	Shriners' Hospital for Crippled Children	Shriners' Hospital for Crippled Children	June 1, 2015 (#15000306)	700–728 S. Euclid & 4565 Clayton Ave. 38°38′01″N 90°15′46″W	
161	Simmons Colored School	Simmons Colored School	September 17, 1999 (#99001163)	4306–4318 St. Louis Ave. 38°39′54″N 90°14′15″W	
162	Sligo Iron Store Co. Buildings	Sligo Iron Store Co. Buildings	April 21, 2010 (#10000205)	1301 N. 6th St. 38°38′15″N 90°11′14″W	
163	Smith Academy and Manual Training School	Smith Academy and Manual Training School	April 28, 2003 (#03000296)	5351 Enright Ave. 38°39′20″N 90°16′31″W	
164	Standard Adding Machine Building	Standard Adding Machine Building	November 25, 2005 (#05001328)	3701 Forest Park Boulevard; 38°38′09″N 90°14′17″W	
165	Standard Stamping Company Factory	Standard Stamping Company Factory	January 20, 2020 (#100004877)	2000 North Broadway; 38°38′50″N 90°11′16″W	
166	Star Bucket Pump Company Building	Star Bucket Pump Company Building	September 19, 2012 (#12000794)	1218–1224 N. 15th St. 38°38′19″N 90°11′55″W	Demolished
167	Stix, Baer and Fuller Dry Goods Company's "Grand Leader" Relay Station	Stix, Baer and Fuller Dry Goods Company's "Grand Leader" Relay Station	July 17, 2002 (#02000805)	3712–3748 Laclede Ave. and 3717 Forest Park Boulevard; 38°38′11″N 90°14′19″W	
168	Robert Henry Stockton House	Robert Henry Stockton House	August 10, 1988 (#88001177)	3508 Samuel Shepard Dr. 38°38′21″N 90°13′46″W	
169	Stowe Teachers College	Stowe Teachers College	September 17, 1999 (#99001161)	2615 Billups; 38°39′45″N 90°14′24″W	
170	Charles Sumner High School	Charles Sumner High School	April 19, 1988 (#88000469)	4248 W. Cottage Ave. 38°39′34″N 90°14′21″W	
171	Tandy Community Center	Tandy Community Center	September 17, 1999 (#99001160)	4206 W. Kennerly Ave. 38°39′42″N 90°14′13″W	
172	Taylor-Olive Building	Taylor-Olive Building	December 12, 2002 (#02001494)	4505 Olive St. 38°38′53″N 90°15′17″W	
173	Charles Turner Open Air School	Charles Turner Open Air School	September 17, 1999 (#99001165)	4235 W. Kennerly Ave. 38°39′40″N 90°14′19″W	
174	Mark Twain Elementary School	Mark Twain Elementary School	July 14, 2011 (#11000445)	5316 Ruskin Ave. 38°41′26″N 90°14′33″W	
175	United Railways Spring Avenue Substation-Trouble Station	United Railways Spring Avenue Substation-Trouble Station	January 21, 2020 (#100004876)	2423 North Spring Ave. 38°39′10″N 90°13′31″W	
176	Vashon Community Center	Vashon Community Center	August 11, 2005 (#05000882)	3145 Market St. 38°37′59″N 90°13′36″W	
177	Vesper-Buick Auto Company Building	Vesper-Buick Auto Company Building	October 2, 1986 (#86002814)	3900–3912 W. Pine; 38°38′13″N 90°14′30″W	demolished in 1995
178	Wagoner Place Historic District	Wagoner Place Historic District	December 19, 2007 (#07001292)	Bounded by Dick Gregory, Marcus, Dr. M.L. King, and N. Market Sts. 38°39′42″N 90°15′07″W	
179	Wainwright Tomb	Wainwright Tomb	June 15, 1970 (#70000907)	Bellefontaine Cemetery, 4947 W. Florissant Ave. 38°41′20″N 90°13′28″W	
180	Walnut Park School	Walnut Park School	April 23, 2013 (#13000194)	5314 Riverview Boulevard and 5814 Thekla Ave. 38°42′09″N 90°15′12″W	
181	Washington Metropolitan African Methodist Episcopal Zion Church	Washington Metropolitan African Methodist Episcopal Zion Church	December 29, 2005 (#05001095)	613 N. Garrison Ave. 38°38′21″N 90°13′17″W	
182	Washington University Dental Department Building	Washington University Dental Department Building	March 13, 2017 (#100000751)	2647 Locust St. 38°38′04″N 90°12′55″W	
183	Washington University Hilltop Campus Historic District	Washington University Hilltop Campus Historic District	January 12, 1979 (#79003636)	Roughly bounded by Big Bend, Forsyth, Skinker, and Millbrook Boulevards; 38°38′54″N 90°18′35″W	
184	Waterman Place-Kingsbury Place-Washington Terrace Historic District	Waterman Place-Kingsbury Place-Washington Terrace Historic District	June 12, 2007 (#07000549)	Bounded by Union Boulevard, the alley south of Waterman Place, Belt Ave., the alley south of Kingsbury Place, Clara Ave., and the former alley line between Washington Terrace and Delmar; 38°38′56″N 90°16′34″W	
185	Welfare Finance Company Building	Welfare Finance Company Building	March 22, 2016 (#16000103)	1027–29 N. Grand Blvd. 38°38′35″N 90°13′44″W	
186	Wellston J.C. Penney Building	Wellston J.C. Penney Building	February 5, 2009 (#08001410)	5930 Dr. Martin Luther King Dr. 38°40′27″N 90°17′00″W	
187	Wellston Loop Commercial Historic District	Wellston Loop Commercial Historic District	September 9, 2010 (#09001266)	Bounded by the city limits, the alleys south and north of Martin Luther King Dr. and Clara Ave. 38°40′21″N 90°16′49″W	
188	Wellston Station	Wellston Station	May 2, 2007 (#07000377)	6111 Dr. Martin Luther King Dr. 38°40′31″N 90°17′00″W	
189	West Cabanne Place Historic District	West Cabanne Place Historic District	November 21, 1980 (#80004393)	West Cabanne Place; 38°39′31″N 90°17′34″W	
190	West Locust and Olive Street Commercial and Industrial District	West Locust and Olive Street Commercial and Industrial District	September 6, 2006 (#06000787)	Roughly bounded by Theresa, Olive, Locust, and Leonard; 38°38′20″N 90°13′44″W	
191	West Pine-Laclede Historic District	West Pine-Laclede Historic District	May 9, 2002 (#02000466)	Roughly bounded by Euclid, Lindell, Sarah, and Forest Park Parkway; 38°38′23″N 90°15′11″W	
192	Western Electric-Southwestern Bell Telephone Distribution House	Western Electric-Southwestern Bell Telephone Distribution House	July 14, 2011 (#11000446)	4250 Duncan St. 38°38′06″N 90°15′06″W	
193	Zebediah F. Mary H. Wetzell House	Zebediah F. Mary H. Wetzell House	August 1, 2008 (#08000739)	3741 Washington Ave. 38°38′26″N 90°14′02″W	
194	Wiltshire and Versailles Historic Buildings	Wiltshire and Versailles Historic Buildings	September 29, 1982 (#82004744)	724 and 709 Skinker Boulevard; 38°38′13″N 90°18′15″W	
195	Henry L. Wolfner Memorial Library for the Blind	Henry L. Wolfner Memorial Library for the Blind	June 30, 2005 (#05000631)	3842–3844 Olive St. 38°38′33″N 90°14′19″W	
196	Wydown-Forsyth District	Wydown-Forsyth District	May 23, 1988 (#88000628)	Roughly bounded by Forsyth, Skinker Boulevard, Fauquier, Wydown Terrace Dr., and University Ln. 38°38′38″N 90°18′25″W	
197	Yeatman Square Historic District	Yeatman Square Historic District	May 8, 2012 (#12000255)	Parts of Glasgow, Leffingwell, Madison, Magazine, and N. Market Sts. 38°38′56″N 90°12′59″W	
198	YWCA, Phillis Wheatley Branch	YWCA, Phillis Wheatley Branch	July 24, 1984 (#84002694)	2709 Locust St. 38°38′06″N 90°12′59″W	
