= List of Nobel laureates affiliated with Washington University in St. Louis as alumni or faculty =

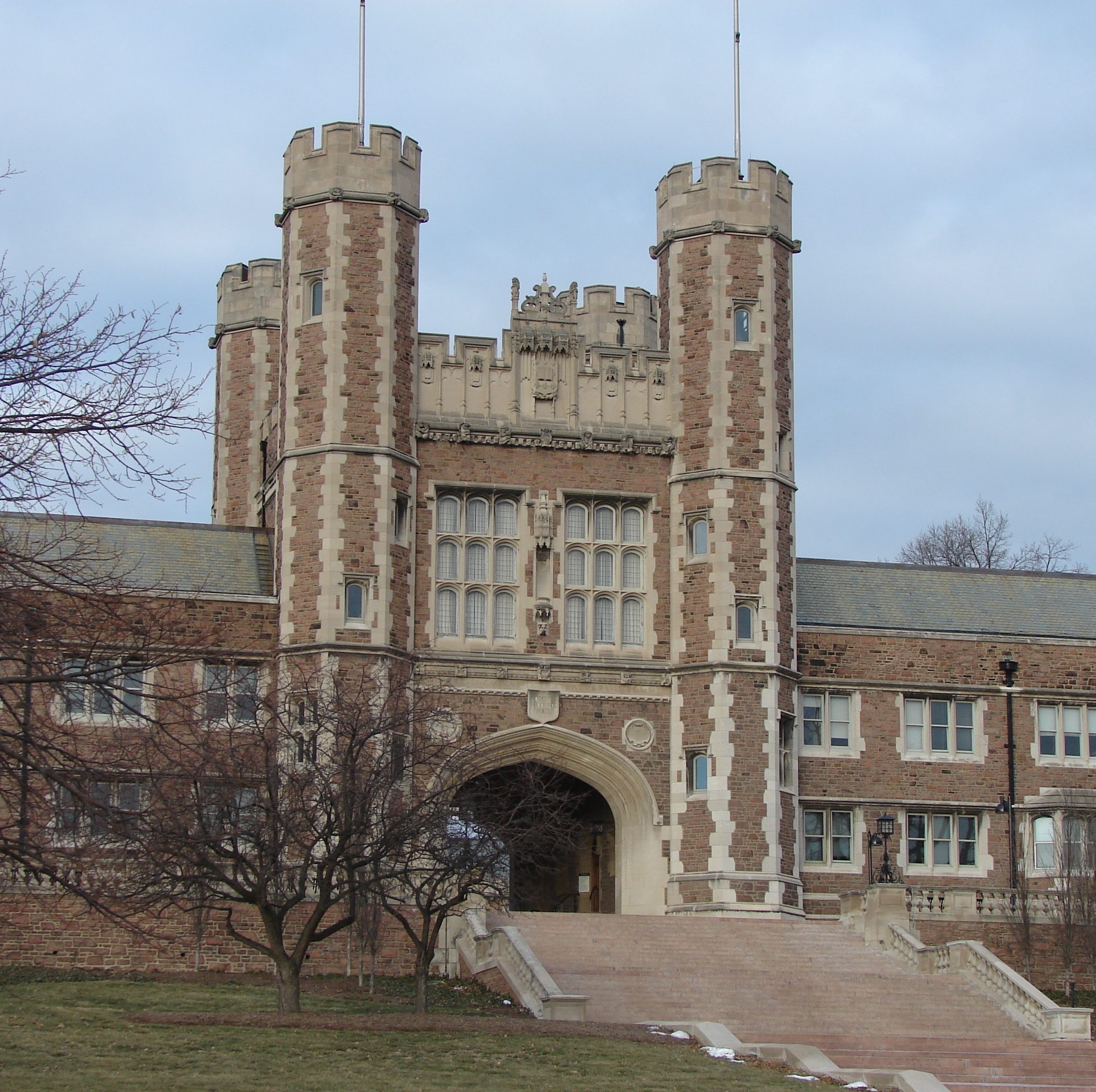
Twenty-six Nobel laureates have been affiliated with Washington University in St. Louis. The building pictured is Brookings Hall.

This list of Nobel laureates affiliated with Washington University in St. Louis as alumni or faculty comprehensively shows alumni (graduates and attendees) or faculty members (professors of various ranks, researchers, and visiting lecturers or professors) affiliated with Washington University in St. Louis who were awarded the Nobel Prize or the Nobel Memorial Prize in Economic Sciences. People who have given public lectures, talks or non-curricular seminars; studied as non-degree students; received honorary degrees; or served as administrative staff at the university are excluded from the list. Summer school attendees and visitors are generally excluded from the list, since summer terms are not part of formal academic years; the same rule applies to the extension school.

The Nobel Prizes are awarded annually by the Royal Swedish Academy of Sciences, the Karolinska Institute, and the Norwegian Nobel Committee to individuals who make outstanding contributions in the fields of chemistry, physics, literature, peace, and physiology or medicine. They were established by the 1895 will of Alfred Nobel, which dictates that the awards should be administered by the Nobel Foundation. Another prize, the Nobel Memorial Prize in Economic Sciences, was established in 1968 by the Sveriges Riksbank, the central bank of Sweden, for contributors to the field of economics. Each prize is awarded by a separate committee; the Royal Swedish Academy of Sciences awards the Prizes in Physics, Chemistry, and Economics, the Karolinska Institute awards the Prize in Physiology or Medicine, and the Norwegian Nobel Committee awards the Prize in Peace. Each recipient receives a medal, a diploma and a cash prize that has varied throughout the years. In 1901, the winners of the first Nobel Prizes were given 150,782 SEK, which is equal to 7,731,004 SEK in December 2007. In 2008, the winners were awarded a prize amount of 10,000,000 SEK. The awards are presented in Stockholm in an annual ceremony on December 10, the anniversary of Nobel's death.

As of 2022, there have been 26 laureates affiliated with Washington University in St. Louis. Washington University considers laureates who attended the university as undergraduate students, graduate students or were members of the faculty as affiliated laureates. Arthur Compton, the chancellor of the university from 1945 to 1953, was the first laureate affiliated with the university, winning the Nobel Prize in Physics in 1927. Four Nobel Prizes were shared by Washington University laureates; Joseph Erlanger and Herbert Spencer Gasser won the 1944 Nobel Prize in Physiology or Medicine, Carl Ferdinand Cori and wife Gerty Cori won the 1947 Nobel Prize in Physiology or Medicine, Arthur Kornberg and Severo Ochoa won the 1959 Nobel Prize in Physiology or Medicine, and Daniel Nathans and George Davis Snell won the 1980 Nobel Prize in Physiology or Medicine. Seventeen Washington University laureates have won the Nobel Prize in Physiology or Medicine, more than any other category. With the exception of Daniel Nathans, who received his M.D. from Washington University and William E. Moerner who received his undergraduate degrees from the university, all Washington University laureates have been members of the university faculty. Also of note, co-discoverer of the neutrino Clyde Cowan, received master's and doctoral degrees from the university but died before the Nobel Prize was awarded for that work in 1995.

== Laureates ==
Year	Image	Laureate	Relation	Category	Rationale
1927		Arthur Compton	Faculty of Arts and Sciences, 1920–1923 and 1945–1962, Chancellor, 1945–1953	Physics	"for his discovery of the effect named after him"
1943		Edward Adelbert Doisy	Faculty of Medicine, 1919–1923	Physiology or Medicine	"for his discovery of the chemical nature of vitamin K"
1944		Joseph Erlanger	Chairman, Department of Physiology, 1910–1946	Physiology or Medicine	"for their discoveries relating to the highly differentiated functions of single nerve fibres"
1944		Herbert Spencer Gasser	Faculty of Medicine, 1916–1931	Physiology or Medicine	"for their discoveries relating to the highly differentiated functions of single nerve fibres"
1947		Carl Ferdinand Cori	Faculty of Medicine, 1931–1984	Physiology or Medicine	"for their discovery of the course of the catalytic conversion of glycogen"
1947		Gerty Cori	Faculty of Medicine, 1931–1957	Physiology or Medicine	"for their discovery of the course of the catalytic conversion of glycogen"
1959		Arthur Kornberg	Chairman, Department of Microbiology, 1952–1959	Physiology or Medicine	"for their discovery of the mechanisms in the biological synthesis of ribonucleic acid and deoxyribonucleic acid"
1959		Severo Ochoa	Faculty of Medicine, 1940–1942	Physiology or Medicine	"for their discovery of the mechanisms in the biological synthesis of ribonucleic acid and deoxyribonucleic acid"
1969		Alfred Hershey	Faculty of Medicine, 1934–1950	Physiology or Medicine	"for their discoveries concerning the replication mechanism and the genetic structure of viruses"
1970		Luis Federico Leloir	Faculty of Medicine, 1944	Chemistry	"for his discovery of sugar nucleotides and their role in the biosynthesis of carbohydrates"
1971		Earl Wilbur Sutherland Jr.	M.D., 1942, Resident in Internal Medicine, 1943–1945, Faculty of Medicine, 1945–1953	Physiology or Medicine	"for his discoveries concerning the mechanisms of the action of hormones"
1974		Christian de Duve	Faculty of Medicine, 1946–1947	Physiology or Medicine	"for their discoveries concerning the structural and functional organization of the cell"
1978		Daniel Nathans	M.D., 1954	Physiology or Medicine	"for the discovery of restriction enzymes and their application to problems of molecular genetics"
1978		Hamilton O. Smith	Washington University Medical Service, 1956–1957	Physiology or Medicine	"for the discovery of restriction enzymes and their application to problems of molecular genetics"
1980		Paul Berg	Faculty of Medicine, 1954–1959	Chemistry	"for his fundamental studies of the biochemistry of nucleic acids, with particular regard to recombinant-DNA"
1980		George Davis Snell	Faculty of Arts and Sciences, 1933–1934	Physiology or Medicine	"for their discoveries concerning genetically determined structures on the cell surface that regulate immunological reactions"
1986		Stanley Cohen	Faculty of Arts and Sciences, 1953–1959	Physiology or Medicine	"for their discoveries of growth factors"
1986		Rita Levi-Montalcini	Faculty of Arts and Sciences, 1948–1977	Physiology or Medicine	"for their discoveries of growth factors"
1992		Edwin G. Krebs	M.D., 1943, Resident in Internal Medicine, Research Fellow in Biological Chemistry, 1945–1948	Physiology or Medicine	"for their discoveries concerning reversible protein phosphorylation as a biological regulatory mechanism"
1993		Douglass North	Faculty of Arts and Sciences, 1983–	Economics	"for having renewed research in economic history by applying economic theory and quantitative methods in order to explain economic and institutional change"
1998		Robert F. Furchgott	Faculty of Medicine, 1949–1956	Physiology or Medicine	"for their discoveries concerning nitric oxide as a signalling molecule in the cardiovascular system"
2004		Aaron Ciechanover	Visiting Professor of Pediatrics, 1987–	Chemistry	"for the discovery of ubiquitin-mediated protein degradation"
2012		Brian Kobilka	Medical Resident 1981–84	Chemistry	"for studies of G-protein-coupled receptors"
2014		William E. Moerner	B.S., B.S., A.B., 1975	Chemistry	"for the development of super-resolved fluorescence microscopy"
2020		Charles M. Rice	Faculty of Medicine, 1986–2001 Adjunct Faculty of Medicine, 2001–present	Physiology or Medicine	"for the discovery of the hepatitis C virus"
2022		Philip H. Dybvig	Faculty of Business, 1989- Visiting Professor, July 1988-December 1988	Economics	“for research on banks and financial crises"
