= Joseph Erlanger House =

- U.S. National Register of Historic Places
- U.S. National Historic Landmark
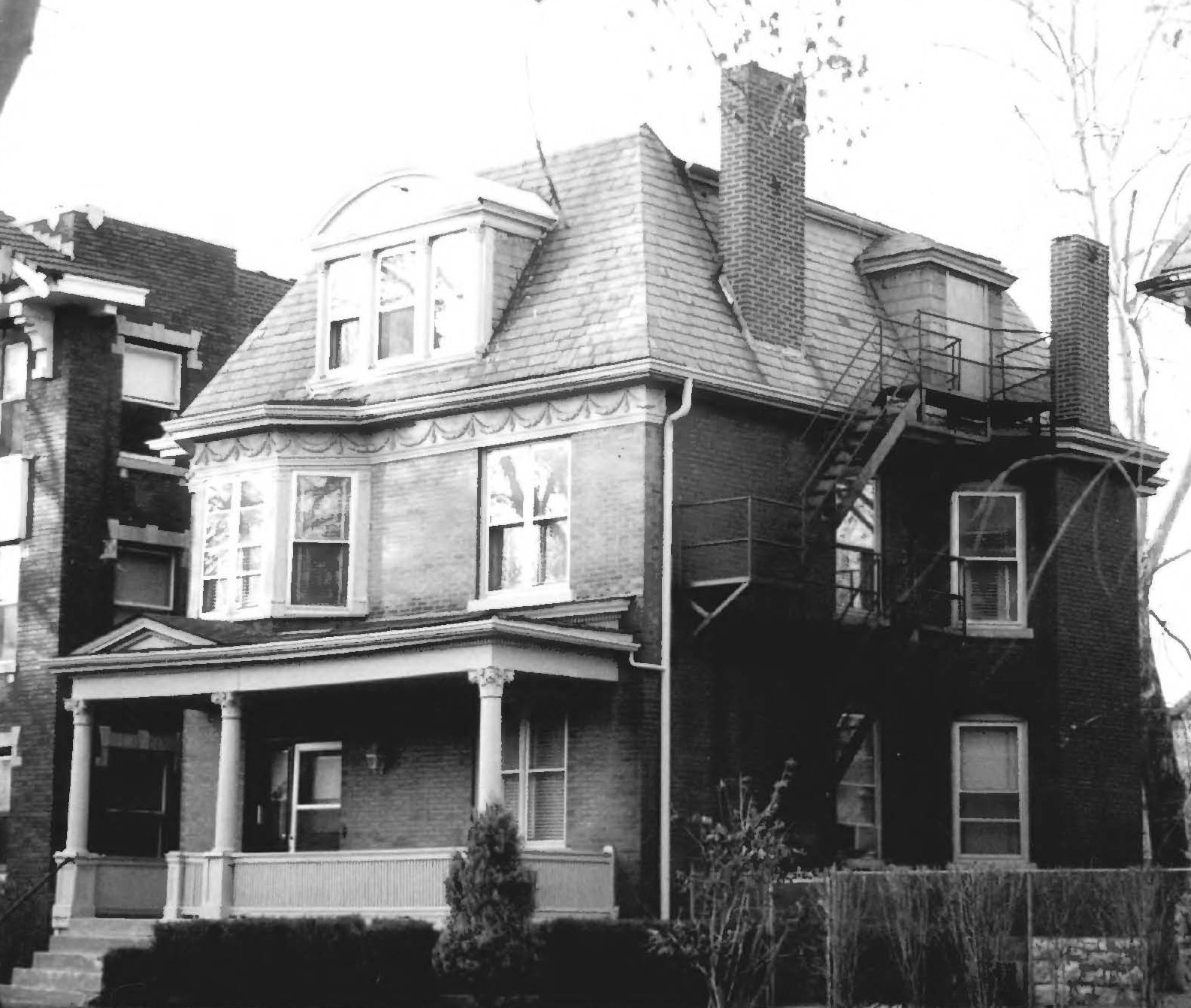
- Joseph Erlanger House, 1975 Park Service photo

- Location within St. Louis Location within Missouri Location within the United States
- Location: 5127 Waterman Blvd., St. Louis, Missouri
- Coordinates: 38°38′55″N 90°16′4″W
- Built: 1903
- NRHP reference No.: 76002234

Significant dates
- Added to NRHP: December 8, 1976
- Designated NHL: December 8, 1976

The Joseph Erlanger House is a historic house at 5127 Waterman Boulevard in St. Louis, Missouri. As a National Historic Landmark, it was designated to recognize the achievements of Joseph Erlanger (1874-1965), an American doctor and physiologist, who was awarded with the Nobel Prize in medicine in 1944. It was Erlanger's home from 1917 until his death. It was declared a National Historic Landmark in 1976. However, the house is not open to the public.

== Description and history ==
The Erlanger House is located in the St. Louis' Forest Park area, on the north side of Waterman Boulevard, between Lake Avenue and Kingshighway Boulevard. It is an architecturally undistinguished suburban two story brick building, with a dormered hip roof. The front facade is made up of two bays wide, with a single-story porch extending across its width. A polygonal window bay projects above the main entrance and a two-story bay projects from the right side. The front roof face has a rounded dormer with three sash windows. The interior follows a side hall plan.

The house is said to have been built about 1903, and was purchased by Dr. Joseph Erlanger in 1917. It is here that Erlanger raised his family and lived while working at Washington University in St. Louis, until the end of his life. Erlanger, a graduate of Johns Hopkins University, first achieved notice as a cardiologist, but achieved his greatest success in the field of neurophysiology. In collaboration with Herbert Spencer Gasser, he developed apparatus for making detailed sensitive measurements of electrical charges that passed through nerve fibers, establishing a relationship between the level of action potential and the nerve diameter. For this, he and Gasser shared the 1944 Nobel Prize in Physiology or Medicine.

== See also ==
- List of National Historic Landmarks in Missouri
- National Register of Historic Places listings in St. Louis north and west of downtown
