= United States Institute for Theatre Technology =

American non-profit organization

- Formation: 1960
- Founded at: New York City
- Website: www.usitt.org

The United States Institute for Theatre Technology (USITT) is a membership organization which aims to advance the skills and knowledge of theatre, entertainment and performing arts professionals involved in the areas of design, production and technology, and to generally promote their interests. To this end, the USITT mounts conferences and exhibitions, promulgates awards and publications (including the official journal Theatre Design & Technology), and supports research. USITT is a non-profit organization which has its headquarters in Syracuse, New York.

USITT heads up a conference held annually since 1961. The conference focuses on various workshops, that help educate attendees on several aspects of theatre. They also have a stage expo, in which companies showcase their products to the individuals attending the conference. There are also many opportunities for students to show their portfolios for review, and to get a look at programs offered by universities and colleges around the country.

The members of the Institute have created a number of projects that have had a lasting impact upon the industry.

USITT sponsors the annual Young Designers and Technicians Awards recognizing the finest young people in the industry.

== Commissions ==
=== Sound Design Commission ===
The Sound Design Commission is a society which assists and promotes theatrical technical professions in the United States. It is one of the newest Commissions created by the USITT within their working groups. In 1980 it appeared as the "Lighting and Sound Design Commission" and the two groups met and worked together for several years until the Sound Design members dramatically outnumbered the Lighting Design members and the Commission was split into two. The first Sound Design Commissioner was Charlie Richmond who served from 1980 through 1988. It remains one of the most active Commissions within the USITT.

=== Education Commission ===
The Education Commission serves students and educators in all areas of theatre design and technology. A diverse group of educators and a student liaison work to develop exciting and innovative programming for each Annual Conference & Stage Expo. The Commission regularly covers such topics as teaching, mentoring, tenure and promotion, curriculum, and student life. In addition, the work of the Education Commission continues throughout the year in the forms of several ongoing projects and archives.

=== Other Commissions ===
USITT also has an Engineering Commission, a Lighting Commission, a Management Commission, a Scene Design Commission, a Costume Commission among others.

== Conference sites ==
2028 Kansas City, Missouri Kansas City Convention Center

2027 Baltimore, Maryland

2026 Long Beach, California

2025 Columbus, Ohio

2024 Seattle, Washington

2023 St. Louis, Missouri

2022 Baltimore, Maryland

2021 Virtual

2020 Cancelled

2019 Louisville, Kentucky

2018 Fort Lauderdale, Florida

2017 St. Louis, Missouri

2016 Salt Lake City, Utah

2015 Cincinnati, Ohio Duke Energy Convention Center

2014 Fort Worth, Texas

2013 Milwaukee, Wisconsin Frontier Airlines Center

2012 Long Beach, California Long Beach Convention and Entertainment Center

2011 Charlotte, North Carolina

2010 Kansas City, Missouri Kansas City Convention Center

2009 Cincinnati, Ohio Duke Energy Center

2008 Houston, Texas George R. Brown Convention Center

2007 Phoenix, Arizona Phoenix Convention Center

2006 Louisville, Kentucky Kentucky International Convention Center

2005 Toronto, Ontario, Canada Metro Toronto Convention Centre

2004 Long Beach, California Long Beach Convention and Entertainment Center

2003 Minneapolis, Minnesota Minneapolis Convention Center

2002 New Orleans, Louisiana Louisiana Superdome

2001 Long Beach, California Long Beach Convention and Entertainment Center

2000 Denver, Colorado Denver Convention Complex

1999 Toronto, Ontario, Canada Metro Toronto Convention Centre

1998 Long Beach, California Long Beach Convention Center

1997 Pittsburgh, Pennsylvania David L. Lawrence Convention Center / Doubletree Hotel

1996 Fort Worth, Texas Tarrant County Convention Center / Radisson Hotel

1995 Las Vegas, Nevada MGM Grand Hotel & Theme Park

1994 Nashville, Tennessee Nashville Convention Center & Stouffers' Hotel

1993 Wichita, Kansas Century II Convention Center / various hotels

1992 Seattle, Washington Washington State Convention & Trade Center / Seattle Sheraton

1991 Boston, Massachusetts Sheraton/Hynes Veterans Memorial Convention Center

1990 Milwaukee, Wisconsin Hyatt Regency Hotel / MECCA

1989 Calgary, Alberta, Canada Calgary Convention Centre

1988 Anaheim, California Disneyland Hotel

1987 Minneapolis, Minnesota Hyatt Regency Hotel

1986 Oakland, California Hyatt Regency Hotel

1985 New York, New York Sheraton Center Hotel Dedicated to Harold Burris-Meyer and Hans Sondheimer

1984 Orlando, Florida Hyatt Regency Hotel

1983 Corpus Christi, Texas Bayfront Convention Center Dedicated to Walter H. Walters

1982 Denver, Colorado Hilton Hotel Dedicated to Herbert D. Greggs

1981 Cleveland, Ohio Stouffers' Inn Dedicated to Margaret Ezekiel

1980 Kansas City, Kansas Glenwood Manor Convention Center

1979 Seattle, Washington Olympic Hotel

1978 Phoenix, Arizona The Adams Hotel

1977 Washington, DC Loews L'Enfant Hotel

1976 New Orleans, Louisiana Marriott Hotel

1975 Anaheim, California Anaheim Convention Center

1974 New York, New York Waldorf Astoria Hotel

1973 St. Louis, Missouri Bel Air East Hotel

1972 San Francisco, California Mark Hopkins Hotel

1971 Dallas, Texas Marriott Hotel

1970 New York, New York Barbizon Plaza Hotel

1969 Los Angeles, California Hollywood Roosevelt Hotel

1968 Chicago, Illinois Goodman Theatre

1967 New York, New York Barbizon Plaza Hotel

1966 Toronto, Ontario, Canada University of Toronto

1965 Bloomington, Indiana Indiana University

1964 New York, New York Barbizon Plaza Hotel

1963 New York, New York The Juilliard School

1962 New York, New York Time-Life Building

1961 New York, New York The Juilliard School
