= Benjamin Banneker High School =

Benjamin Banneker High School can refer to schools in the United States:

- Benjamin Banneker High School (Georgia) in unincorporated Fulton County, Georgia
- Benjamin Banneker Academic High School in Washington, D.C.

== See also ==
- Benjamin Banneker Academy in Brooklyn, New York City
- Benjamin Banneker School in Parkville, Missouri
- Banneker School in St. Louis, Missouri; NRHP-listed
