= Forest Park Hotel =

- U.S. National Register of Historic Places
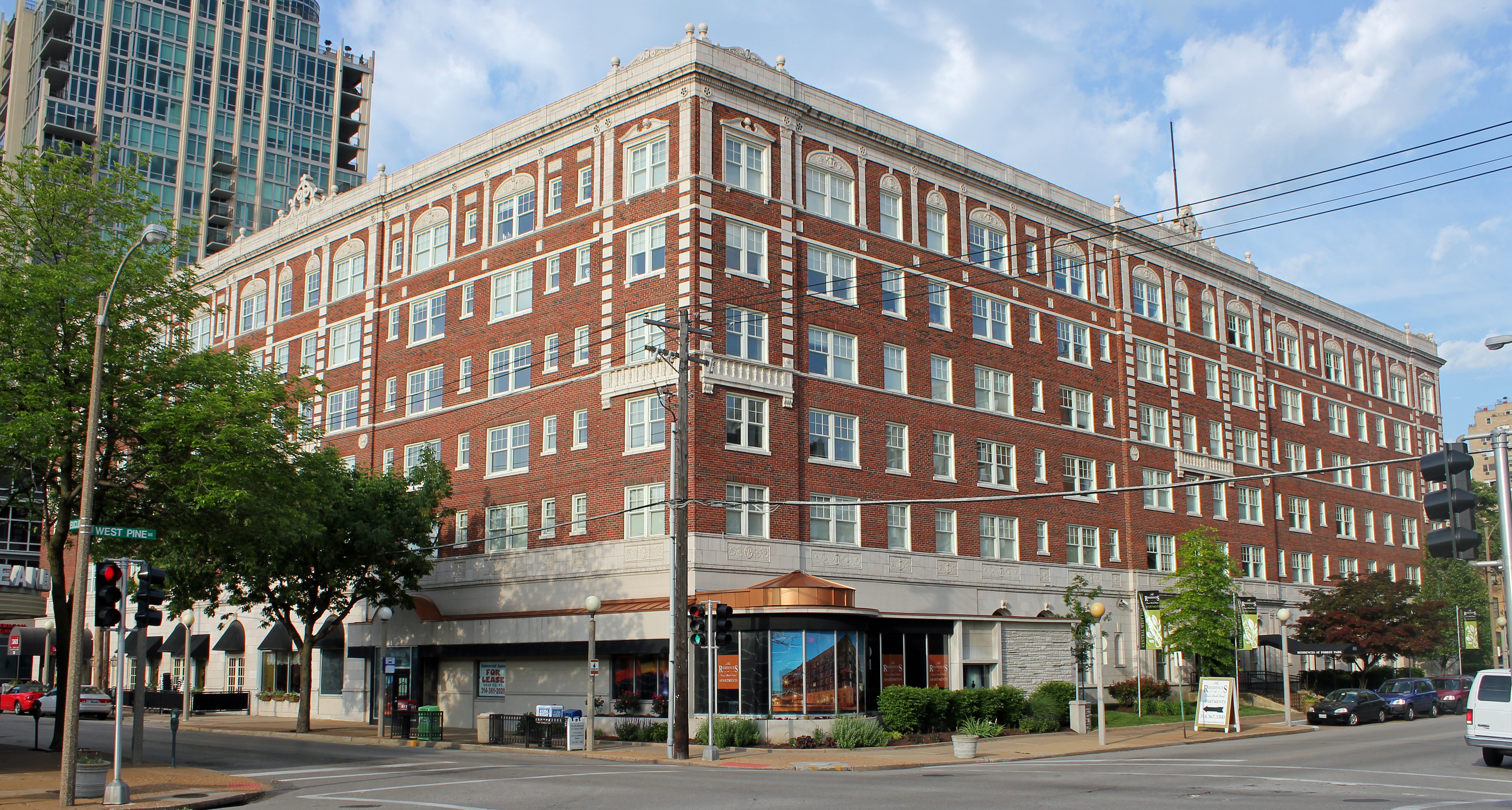

- Location within St. Louis Location within Missouri Location within the United States
- Location: 4910 W. Pine Blvd., St. Louis, Missouri
- Coordinates: 38°38′29″N 90°15′44″W
- Area: 1.2 acres (0.49 ha)
- Built: 1923
- Architect: Preston J. Bradshaw, George D. Barnett, Jr.
- Architectural style: Renaissance
- NRHP reference No.: 84002632
- Added to NRHP: March 22, 1984

The Forest Park Hotel is a six-story building located in the Central West End neighborhood of St. Louis, Missouri and listed on the National Register of Historic Places. The six-story building was built in 1923 and is made of reinforced concrete with red brick curtain walls trimmed with terra cotta. Following the early success of the hotel, a seven-story addition was built in 1926 that closely follows the design of the original building. A one-story stone and glass addition was added to the building's northeast corner in the 1960s.

The original building was designed by Preston J. Bradshaw, a prominent St. Louis architect who also designed the nearby Chase Park Plaza Hotel, Mayfair Hotel, Lennox Hotel, and Coronado Hotel. The center wing addition was designed by George D. Barnett, Jr. and includes several small private dining rooms of considerable architectural interest.

The Forest Park Hotel was once famous for the Circus Snack Bar nightclub located in its ground floor retail space fronting Euclid Avenue. During the nightclub's heyday in the 1930s and 1940s, it was run by local hotelier and businessman Harold Koplar and hosted performers such as Liberace, Louis Armstrong, and Sarah Vaughan.

In 1983, restaurateur Harold Butler, founder of the restaurant chain Denny's, bought the Forest Park Hotel and performed $7 million in renovations. Financial trouble, however, led to the building's sudden foreclosure and vacancy in December 1990.

In 2003, a private development group renovated and converted the long dormant Forest Park Hotel for $20 million into a 115-unit apartment building.

Two successful restaurant owners in the CWE recently signed a contract to open a new restaurant on the first floor of the hotel facing Euclid.
