= Vesper-Buick Auto Company Building =

- U.S. National Register of Historic Places
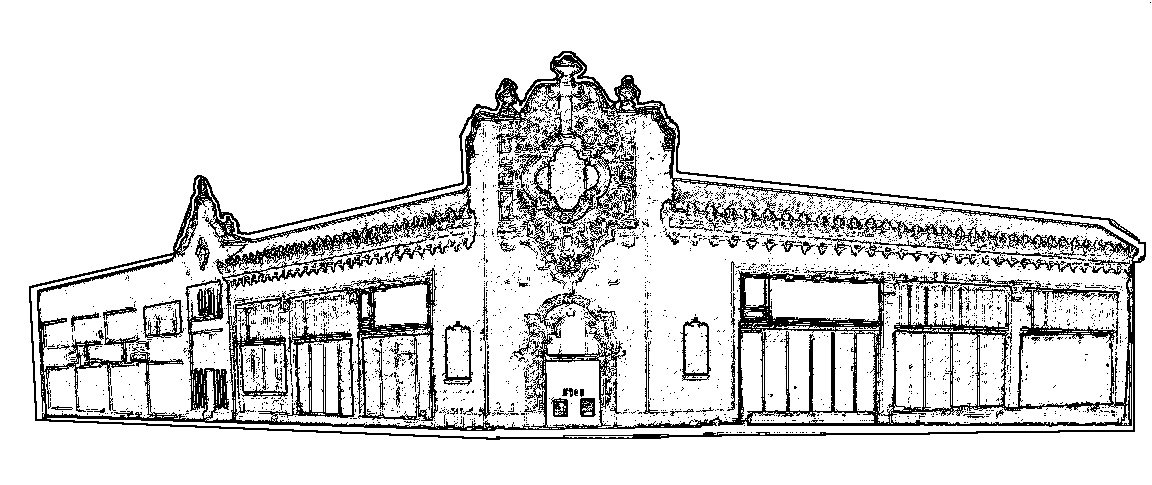

- Location within Missouri Location within the United States
- Location: 3900--3912 W. Pine, St. Louis, Missouri
- Coordinates: 38°38′13″N 90°14′30″W
- Area: less than one acre
- Built: 1927
- Architect: Preston J. Bradshaw
- Architectural style: Mission/spanish Revival, Spanish Colonial Revival
- NRHP reference No.: 86002814
- Added to NRHP: October 2, 1986

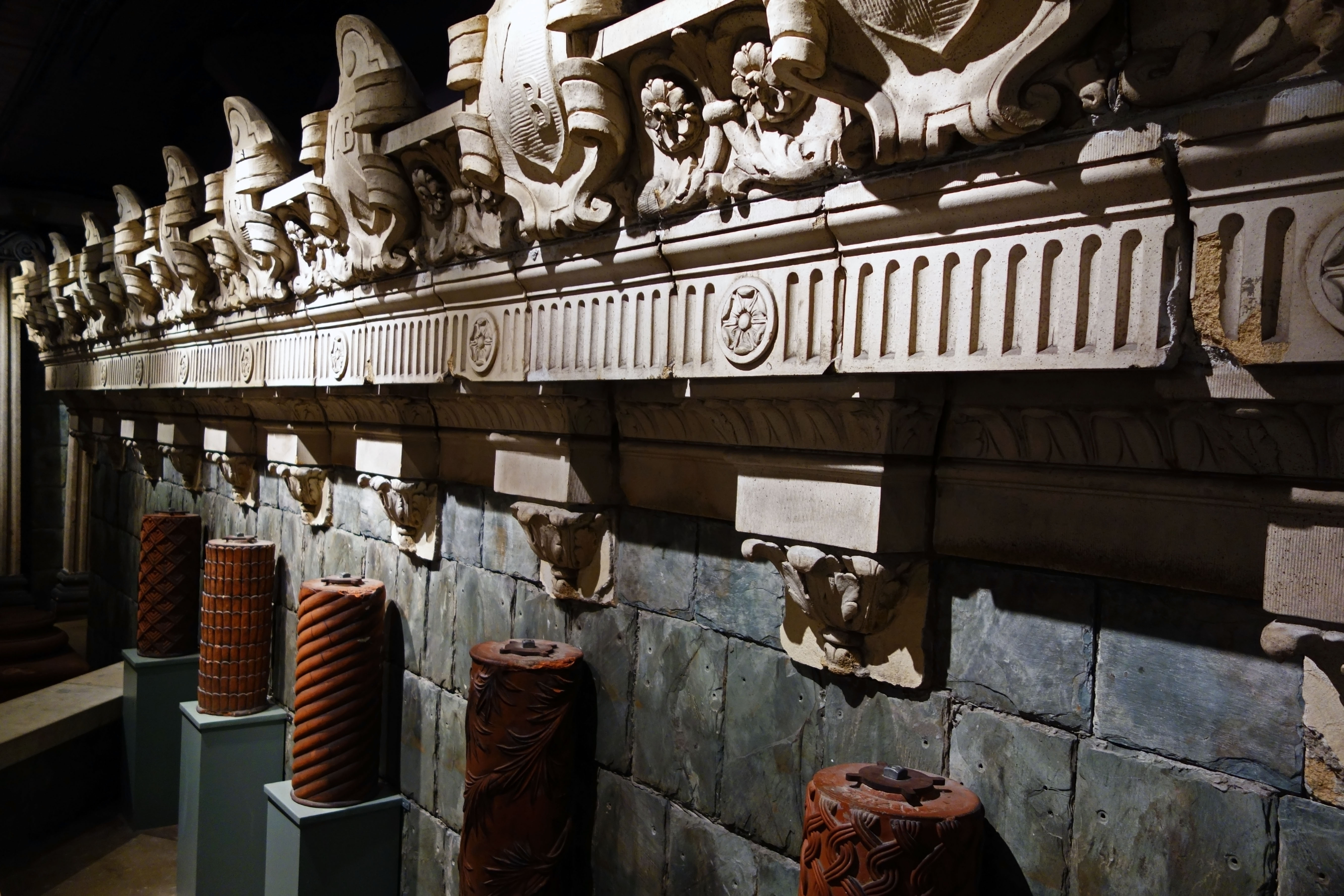
Terracotta cornice from the Vesper-Buick Auto Company Building on display at the Architecture Museum on the third floor of the City Museum

The Vesper-Buick Auto Company Building, at 3900-3912 W. Pine in St. Louis, Missouri, was built in 1927. It was listed on the National Register of Historic Places in 1986.

It was designed by architect Preston J. Bradshaw. The building had two floors and it was deemed notable as "one of St. Louis' best commercial examples of Spanish Colonial Revival, a style infrequently found in the city. The building features a stucco exterior, tile parapet, decorative metal grillwork and a lavish display of terra cotta ornament."

The building’s period of significance was during 1925-1949. The building was demolished in 1995 despite being included in the National Register of Historic Places.
