= Washington Metropolitan A.M.E. Zion Church =

Church in St. Louis, Missouri, US

- Washington Metropolitan African Methodist Episcopal Zion Church
- U.S. National Register of Historic Places
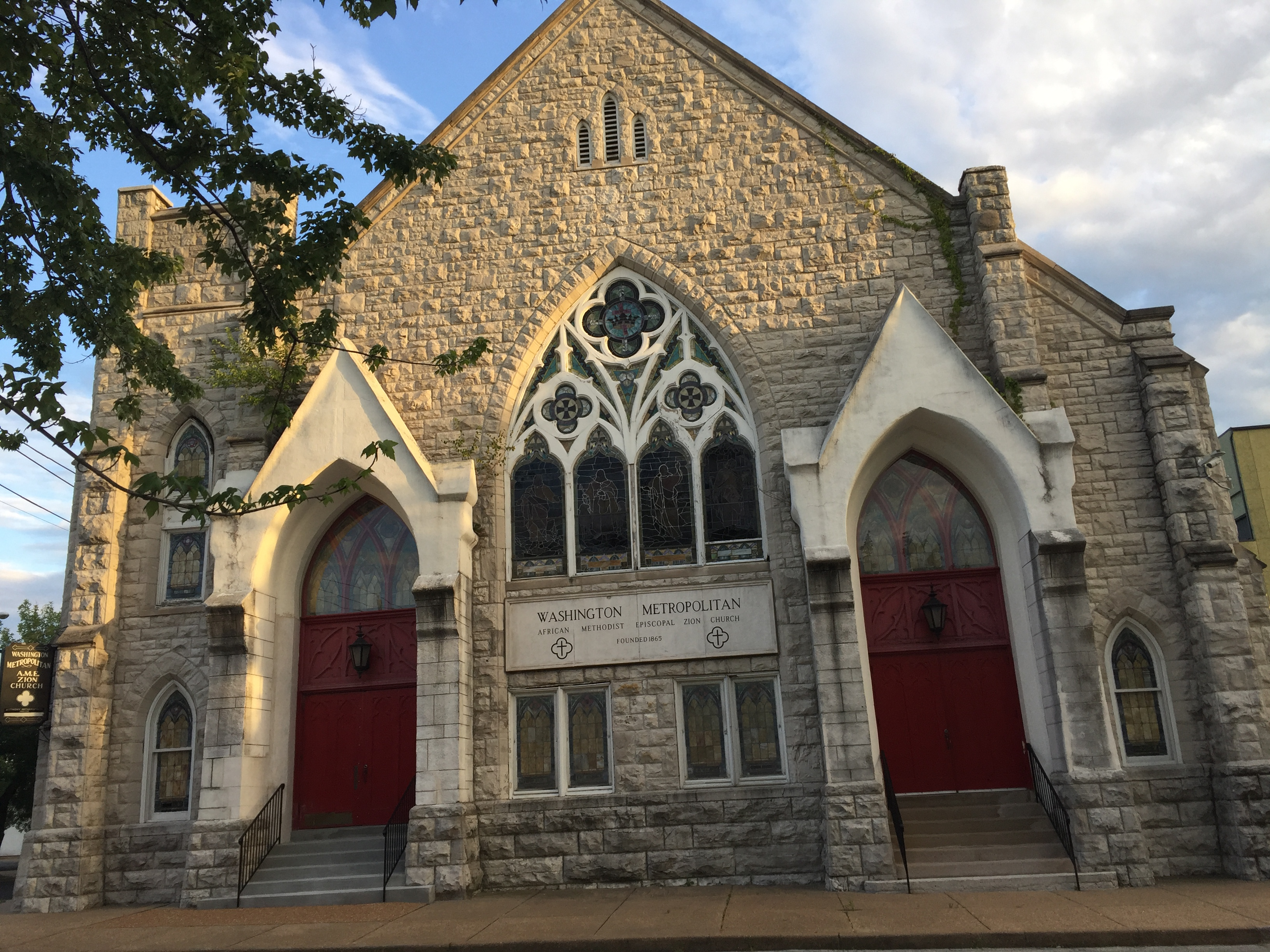
- Location: 613 North Garrison Ave. St. Louis, Missouri, U.S.
- Coordinates: 38°38′15″N 90°13′17″W
- Area: less than one acre
- Built: 1911
- Architect: August M. Beinke, William Anelett Cann
- Architectural style: Gothic Revival
- NRHP reference No.: 05001095
- Added to NRHP: December 29, 2005

Washington Metropolitan African Methodist Episcopal Zion Church is a religious organization and historic church building in St. Louis, Missouri, U.S.. The building originally housed the United Methodist Episcopal Church. It is one of the few surviving examples of Gothic Revival churches in St. Louis. It has been listed as one of the National Register of Historic Places since 2005, for the architecture.

== History ==
=== United Methodist Episcopal Church (1880–1915) ===
Located a few blocks to the northeast of the campus of St. Louis University, the church is one of only a few surviving buildings in the 19th century "Piety Hill" neighborhood.

The Gothic Revival style building was constructed in 1880 from a design by architect August M. Beinke (1846–1901). It was originally a Methodist church, the United Methodist Episcopal Church. After being badly damaged by fire in 1911 the church was rebuilt from plans by architect William Anelett Cann. The building is constructed of rough-cut limestone with brick. After the interior of the church was rebuilt in 1911, features were added such as the vaulted ceiling and stained glass windows. Attached at the church is the parish house designed in 1883 by an unknown architect.

=== Washington Metropolitan A.M.E. Zion ===
The St. Louis congregation which became Washington Metropolitan African Methodist Episcopal Zion church was founded in about 1865 as home prayer meetings with the first known pastor, Gary Matthews. After its founding and over the years, the location of the Washington Metropolitan A.M.E. Zion congregation moved around the neighborhood.

In 1915, the United Methodist Episcopal Church congregation decided to sell their building to Benjamin Garland Shaw and the Washington Metropolitan A.M.E. Zion congregation. Shaw was well-known for his fundraising skills. Under Shaw's leadership, the church opened the AME Zion Social Center in 1915 and offered free classes taught by professionals, including child study and home economics, literature, current events, music, writing, and commercial law. The principal and teachers from the nearby Sumner High School (the only Black school at the time) taught at the church. His work brought him local and national accolades; in 1920, Shaw left St. Louis to become a vicar bishop.

In the 1970s, Rev. Richard Laymon Fisher served as the pastor.

== See also ==
- National Register of Historic Places listings in St. Louis north and west of downtown
