= Banneker School =

Historic school building in St. Louis, Missouri, US

- U.S. National Register of Historic Places
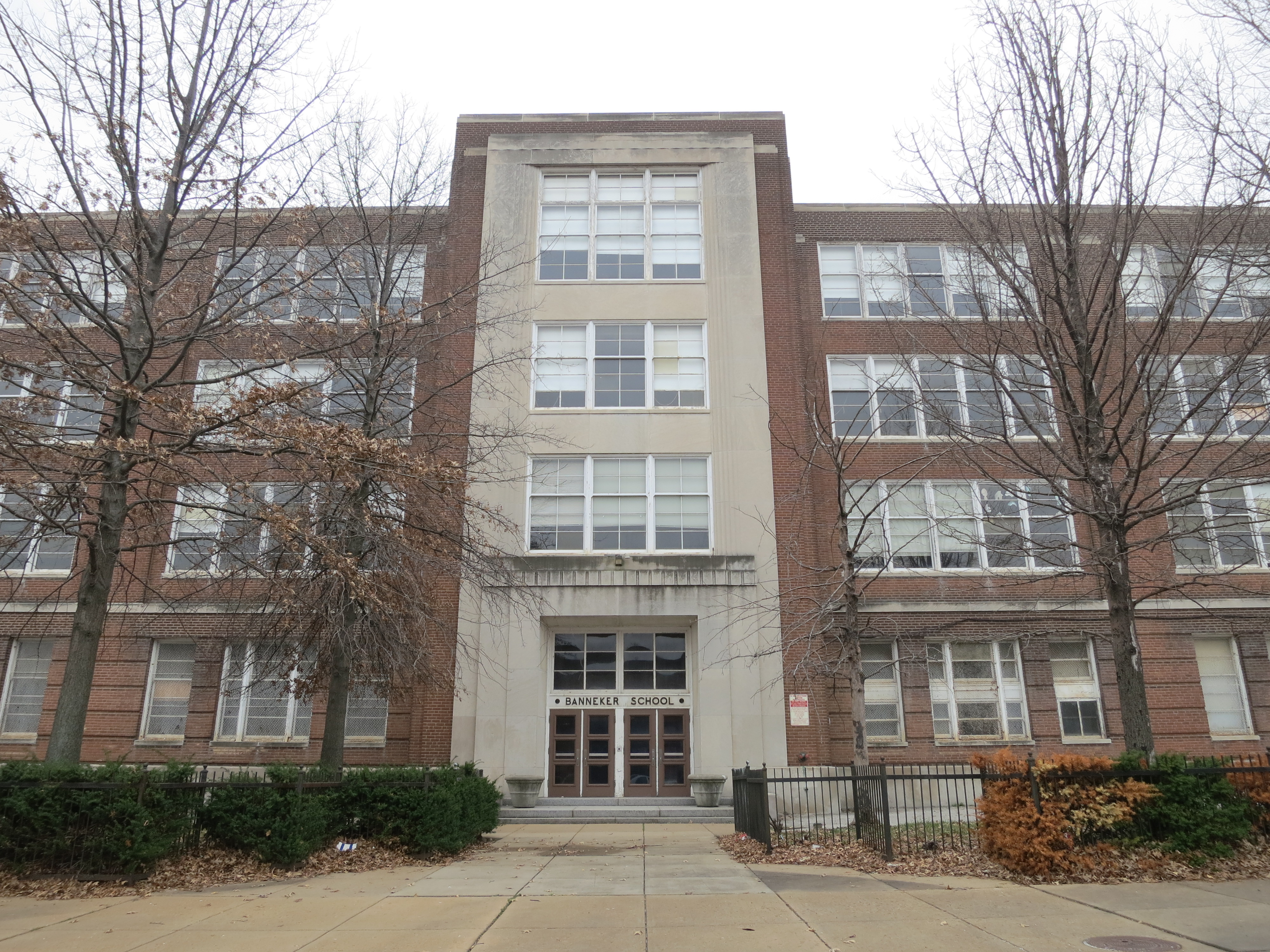

- Location within Missouri
- Location: 2840 Samuel Shepard Drive, St. Louis, Missouri, U.S.
- Coordinates: 38°38′12″N 90°13′08″W
- Area: 1 acre (0.40 ha)
- Built: 1940
- Architect: George W. Sanger
- NRHP reference No.: 100001761
- Added to NRHP: October 23, 2017

The Banneker School is a historic building and former public school active from 1940 to 2005, at 2840 Samuel Shepard Drive in the Midtown neighborhood in St. Louis, Missouri. For most of its time it served as a Black school, and it housed the Banneker District Headquarters.

It has been listed on the National Register of Historic Places since 2017, for its contributions to education, social history, and African American ethnic heritage from 1957 until 1970. Other Banneker District schools listed on the National Register of Historic Places include the Carr School (1419 Carr Street), the Franklin School (814 North 19th Street), and the Pruitt School (1212 North 22nd Street).

== Pre-history ==
It was preceded by the Stoddard School, which had become an African American school by 1930. In the late 1930s the school board began plans to demolish the former Stoddard School buildings, which served some 1477 students.

The namesake of the school was Benjamin Banneker (1731–1804), the African American scientist, surveyor and farmer. The original Banneker Elementary School (formerly named Colored School Number 5) was located at Montgomery Street and Leffingwell Avenue in the 1890s, that building no longer exists.

== History ==
The Banneker School building at 2840 Samuel Shepard Drive is a four-story red brick structure with a concrete foundation and a flat roof. It was designed in 1939 by architect George W. Sanger, who was the chief architect of the school district, St. Louis Public Schools. The construction was partly funded by a Public Works Administration (PWA) grant. It opened in 1940, as a Black school.

In fall of 1955, most of the public elementary and secondary schools in St. Louis were desegregated in their name only. Samuel T. Shepard Jr. (c. 1908–1996) was a Black teacher and he became the administrator of the Banneker District within the St. Louis Public Schools in 1957, where he led in innovations to provide assistance for disadvantaged students. He created the Banneker Project when he became the district superintendent, and rose to national fame for his work in St. Louis. Shepard implementation of the Banneker Project from the offices in the Banneker School. By 1970 the Banneker District had much success with improvements in education but had seen little racial integration or, economic improvement over the years. There was a major reorganization of the St. Louis Public School System in 1970, and the Banneker District was eliminated, and as a result Shepard resigned on August 31, 1970. Shepard's next role was as the superintendent of schools in East Chicago Heights, Illinois (now known as Ford Heights, Illinois).

It remained a neighborhood school, until it closed in 2005. At the time of its closure the entire student body was African American, some 50 years after Brown v. Board of Education (1954) which ruled that U.S. state laws establishing racial segregation in public schools violate the Equal Protection Clause of the Fourteenth Amendment.

== See also ==
- National Register of Historic Places listings in St. Louis north and west of downtown
