= Zebediah F. and Mary H. Wetzell House =

Historic house in Missouri, United States

- Zebediah F. Mary H. Wetzell House
- U.S. National Register of Historic Places
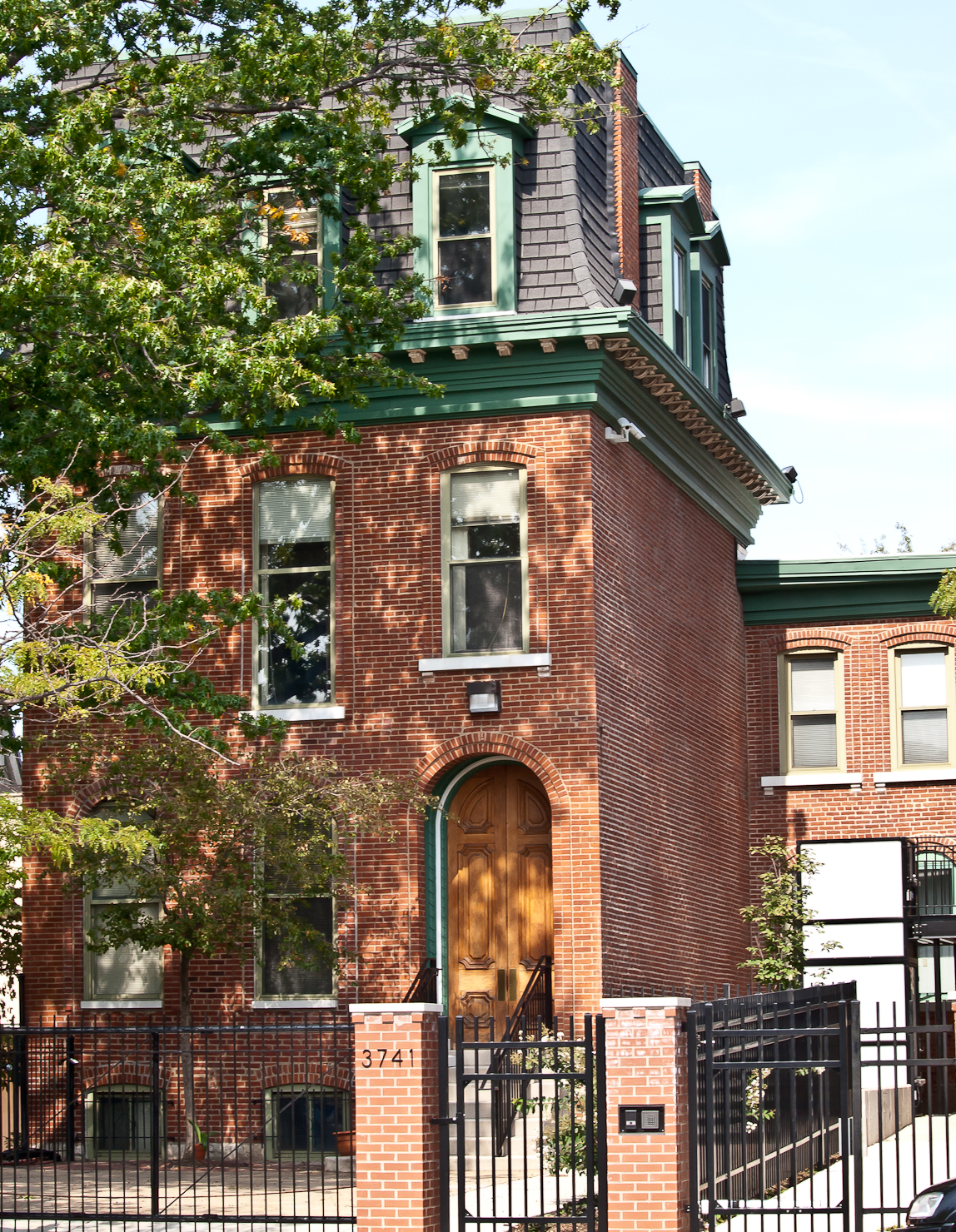

- Location within St. Louis Location within Missouri Location within the United States
- Location: 3741 Washington Ave. St. Louis, Missouri
- Coordinates: 38°38′27.6″N 90°14′04.4″W
- Area: less than one acre
- Built: 1880
- Architectural style: Second Empire
- NRHP reference No.: 08000739
- Added to NRHP: August 1, 2008

The Zebediah F. and Mary H. Wetzell House, also known as St. John Neumann House, is a historic building located in St. Louis, Missouri. Zebediah Wetzell was a native of Washington, D.C., and grew wealthy from the drug and medical supply store he established along the St. Louis riverfront. His wife Mary was a native of Kentucky, and the couple had this house built in 1880 in what was then a fashionable neighborhood on the edge of the city. The three-story brick Second Empire residence is one of two remaining examples of a high-style version in Midtown and one of the only brick examples left in the city. However, at the time it was built the home was one of several found in the Second Empire style in this section of St. Louis. By the turn of the 20th-century, wealthy citizens were moving to the Central West End and Midtown was becoming a commercial area. After Mary Wetzel died in 1897 the house became a residential rental property. In 1946, the concrete block structure adjoining the house to the north and west was built. The facility housed Albert A. Franklin's carpet and rug business. Other businesses occupied the property until it was sold in 1986 to the Redemptorists, a Catholic religious order of men, for their pre-novitiate students who attended Saint Louis University. The neighboring Pendennis Club Apartment Building was also a part of the complex. The Redemptorists moved out in 2007, and the house was added to the National Register of Historic Places in 2008.
