= Pendennis Club Apartment Building =

- U.S. National Register of Historic Places
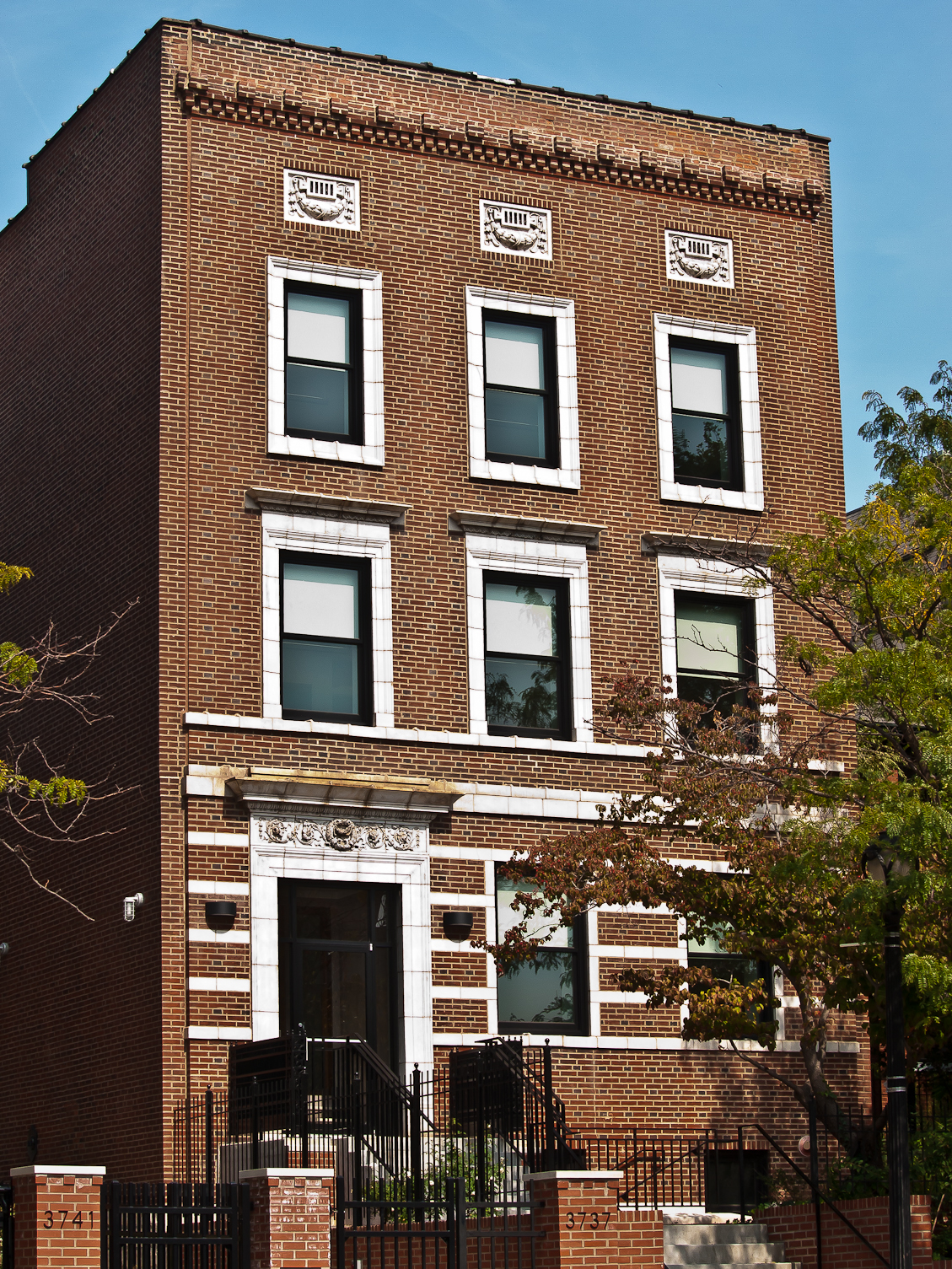

- Location within St. Louis Location within Missouri Location within the United States
- Location: 3737 Washington Ave. St. Louis, Missouri
- Coordinates: 38°38′27.6″N 90°14′03.8″W
- Area: less than one acre
- Built: 1902
- Architect: Edmund Arthur Manny
- Architectural style: Late 19th and 20th Century Revivals
- NRHP reference No.: 08000665
- Added to NRHP: July 16, 2008

The Pendennis Club Apartment Building, also known as Kina Apartments, Tabb Apartments, and St. John Neumann House, is a historic building located in St. Louis, Missouri, USA. Completed in 1902, the three-story brick structure was designed by E.A. Manny. The exterior features simple terra cotta ornamentation that incorporates elements of the Neoclassical style. Each floor includes three apartments and a common room. It was built for the Pendennis Club, a group of bachelors from St. Louis' University Club and named for William Makepeace Thackeray's Major Pendennis, the ultimate bachelor.

The nine men who lived here owned stock in the Pendennis Apartment Company. They were expected to stay single for a few years at least, and any replacements would have to be approved by the others. The services of a maid and cook were included, and any other women were allowed on the premises for special occasions only. The club was part of a distinct bachelor subculture that flourished in the United States between 1890 and 1930. Membership in the Pendennis Club remained strong through the 1920s when it started to decline. It disbanded in 1937. The building was sold and continued as an apartment building open to both men and women. It was sold in 1986 to the Redemptorists, a Catholic religious order of men, for their pre-novitiate students who attended Saint Louis University. The neighboring Zebediah F. and Mary H. Wetzell House and its adjoining building were also a part of the complex. The Redemptorists moved out in 2007, and the apartment building was added to the National Register of Historic Places in 2008.
