= More Automobile Company Building =

- U.S. National Register of Historic Places
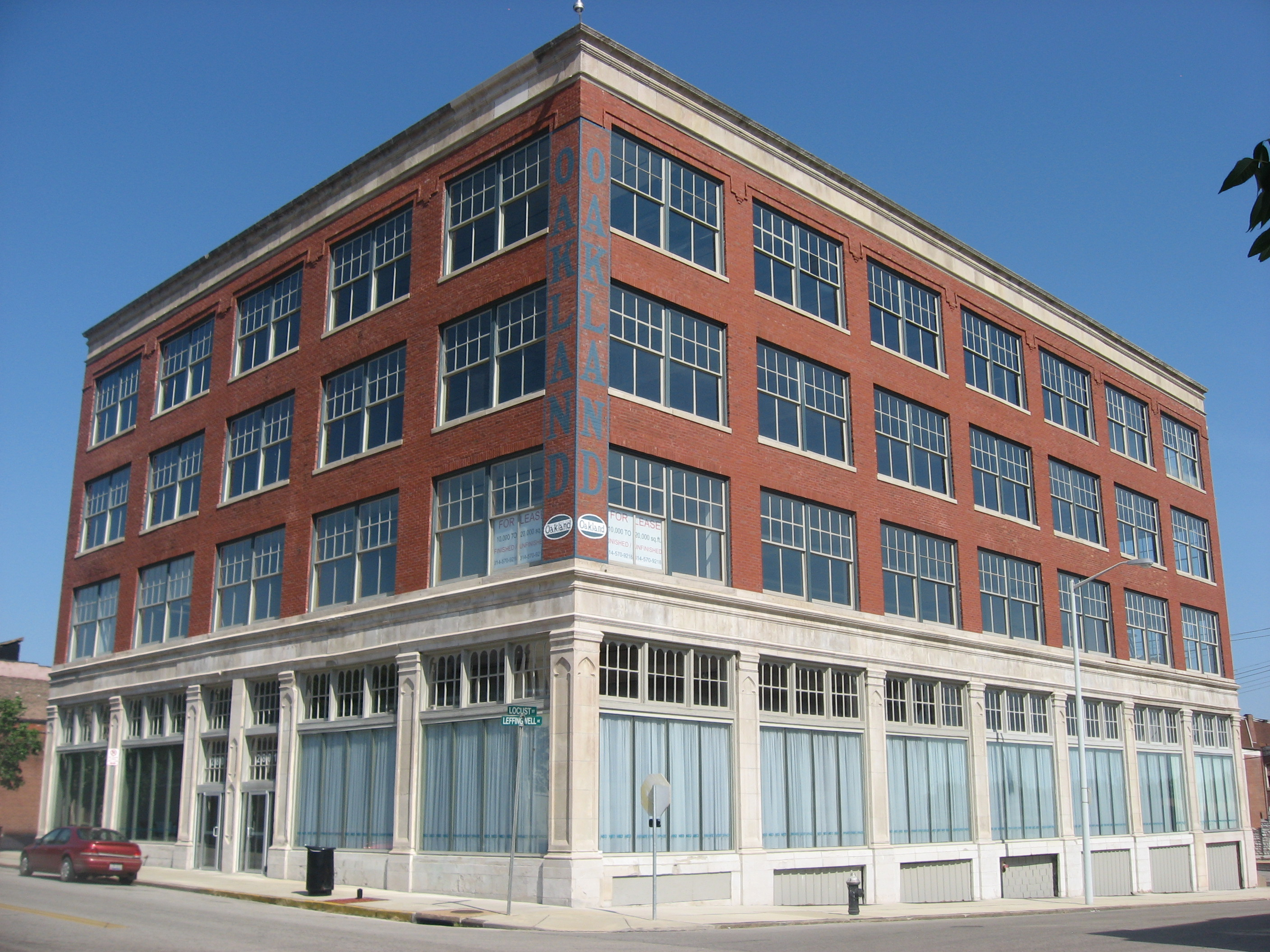

- Location within Missouri Location within the United States
- Location: 2801 Locust St., St. Louis, Missouri
- Coordinates: 38°38′07″N 90°13′05″W
- Area: less than one acre
- Built: 1920
- Architect: Francis C. Cornet
- Architectural style: Classical Revival
- MPS: Auto-Related Resources of St. Louis, Missouri MPS
- NRHP reference No.: 08001130
- Added to NRHP: December 3, 2008

The More Automobile Company Building, at 2801 Locust St. in St. Louis, Missouri, was built in 1920. It was listed on the National Register of Historic Places in 2008.

It is a four-story (plus basement) flat-roofed building with a brick curtain wall and concrete framing.

It was designed by architect Francis C. Cornet and includes elements of Classical Revival style (including in its symmetry of design and its limestone detailing).

After a 2008 renovation, it has been known as the Oakland Building, and it hosts the NEO on Locust event space.
