= Autocar Sales and Service Building =

- U.S. National Register of Historic Places
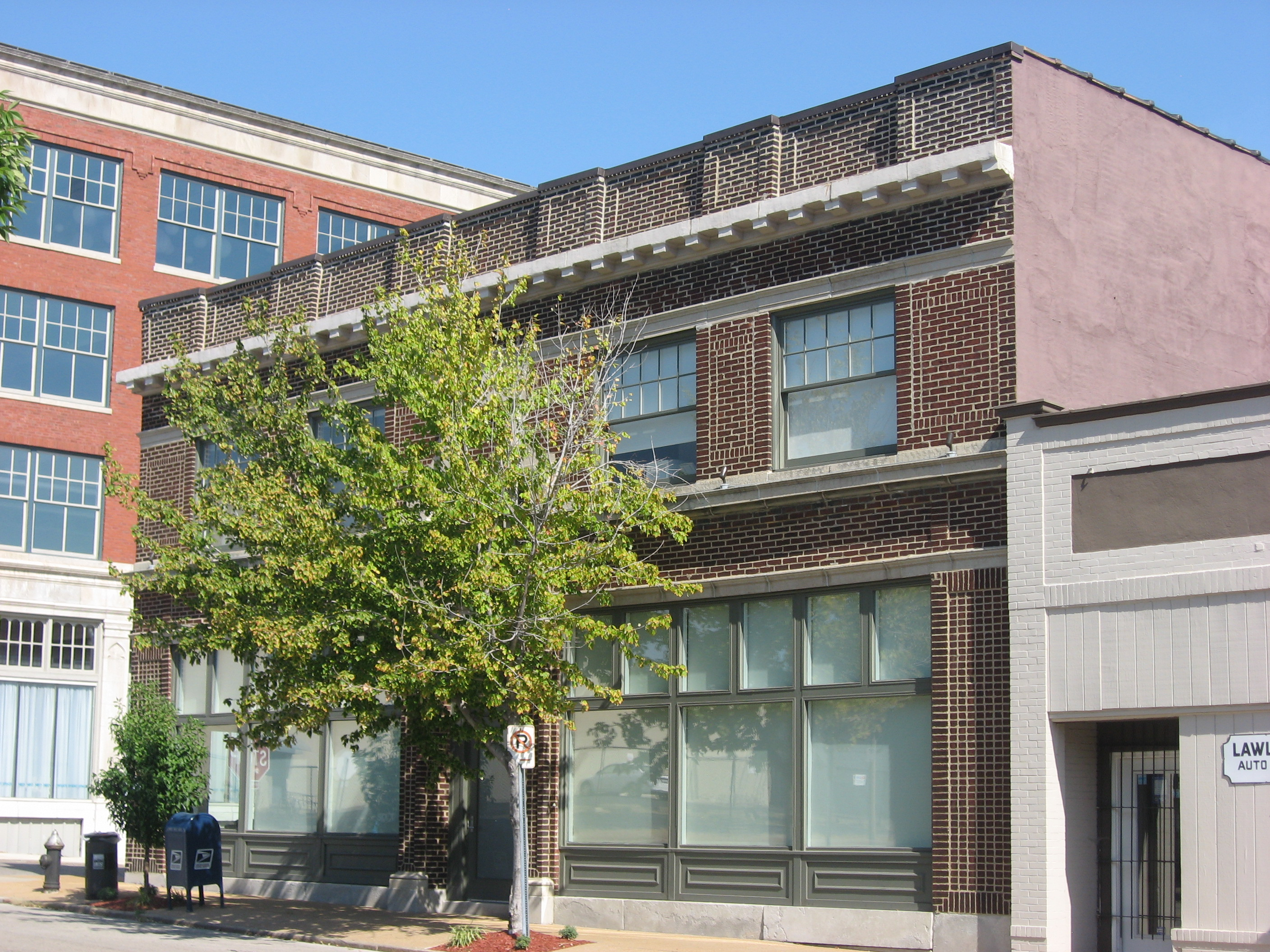

- Location within Missouri Location within the United States
- Location: 2745 Locust, St. Louis, Missouri
- Coordinates: 38°38′07″N 90°13′04″W
- Area: less than one acre
- Built: 1917
- Architect: Preston J. Bradshaw
- Architectural style: Two-Part Commercial Block
- MPS: Auto-Related Resources of St. Louis, Missouri MPS
- NRHP reference No.: 06000530
- Added to NRHP: June 26, 2006

The Autocar Sales and Service Building, at 2745 Locust in St. Louis, Missouri, was built in 1917. It was listed on the National Register of Historic Places in 2006.

It was designed by St. Louis architect Preston J. Bradshaw. It is a two-story brown brick concrete-framed curtain wall building. It includes Classical Revival details.
