= Cotton Belt Freight Depot =

- U.S. National Register of Historic Places
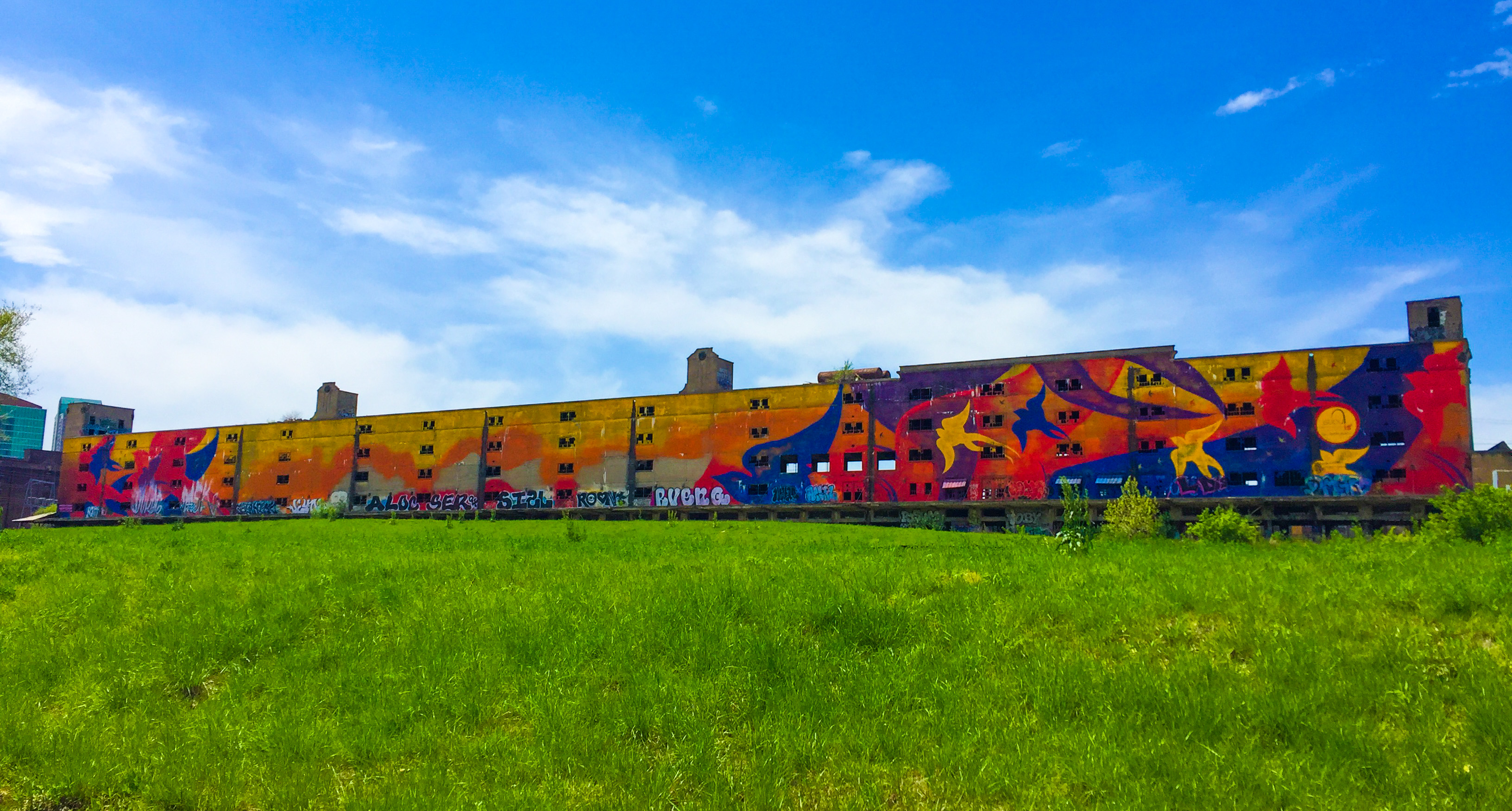
- Cotton Belt Freight Depot in May 2018

- Location within St. Louis Location within Missouri Location within the United States
- Location: 1400 N. 1st St., St. Louis, Missouri
- Coordinates: 38°38′27″N 90°10′57″W
- Area: less than one acre
- Built: 1913
- Built by: St. Louis Southwestern Railway; Thompson & Scott
- Architectural style: Railroad freight depot
- NRHP reference No.: 04000344
- Added to NRHP: April 21, 2004

The Cotton Belt Freight Depot is a former freight depot of the St. Louis Southwestern Railway in the Near North Riverfront neighborhood of St. Louis, Missouri. It was listed on the U.S. National Register of Historic Places in 2004 and named "Best Old Building" by the Riverfront Times, a weekly newspaper in St. Louis.

Since 2002, the Cotton Belt Freight Depot has been the usual location of Artica, an annual grassroots outdoor and multidisciplinary arts festival.

In 2014, artists completed a large mural on the building's eastern side, visible from the nearby bridge over the Mississippi River.

Today, the building has no formal tenants or function. There are occupants camped in the far North and South ends of the building, where they have built makeshift homes out of found materials like pallets and tires. The upper floors of the building are inaccessible other than by rope or ladder through the open elevator shafts. Windows and doors have been destroyed and the building is open to the elements from its sides. Its primary use today is as a site for graffiti and graffiti art. Its interior walls are an ever-changing canvas.

== History ==
The St. Louis Southwestern Railway (reporting mark SSW), known by its nickname of "The Cotton Belt Route" or simply Cotton Belt, was a U.S. Class I railroad that operated between St. Louis and various points in the states of Arkansas and Texas from 1891 to 1992.

The railroad began building the five-story freight depot in 1911 to help move freight. The depot opened on January 1, 1913, with two miles of house, team, and storage tracks.

It has been vacant since 1959. When it was closed, the freight forwarding company, Acme, moved its operations to East St. Louis to be closer to Valley Junction Yard.

== Architecture ==
The building is notable for its long, narrow shape. The concrete building stretches about 750 feet (230 m) on its east and west elevations and 30 feet (9.1 m) on the north and south. The five stories include a series of loading dock doors on both sides that are sheltered by a concrete awning. Widely spaced metal-frame industrial-type windows line the upper stories. A slightly taller cornice line marks the section of the building where the company offices were located. Most of the building's detail is reserved for this section where the company's name is displayed in two levels over a bay window.

Other details include terra cotta medallions on the corners bearing the name "Cotton Belt Route"; a Classical-style frame around the office door; keystones that decorate the windows near the building's north end; and copper lions' heads that join the awning poles to the building.

== Gallery ==
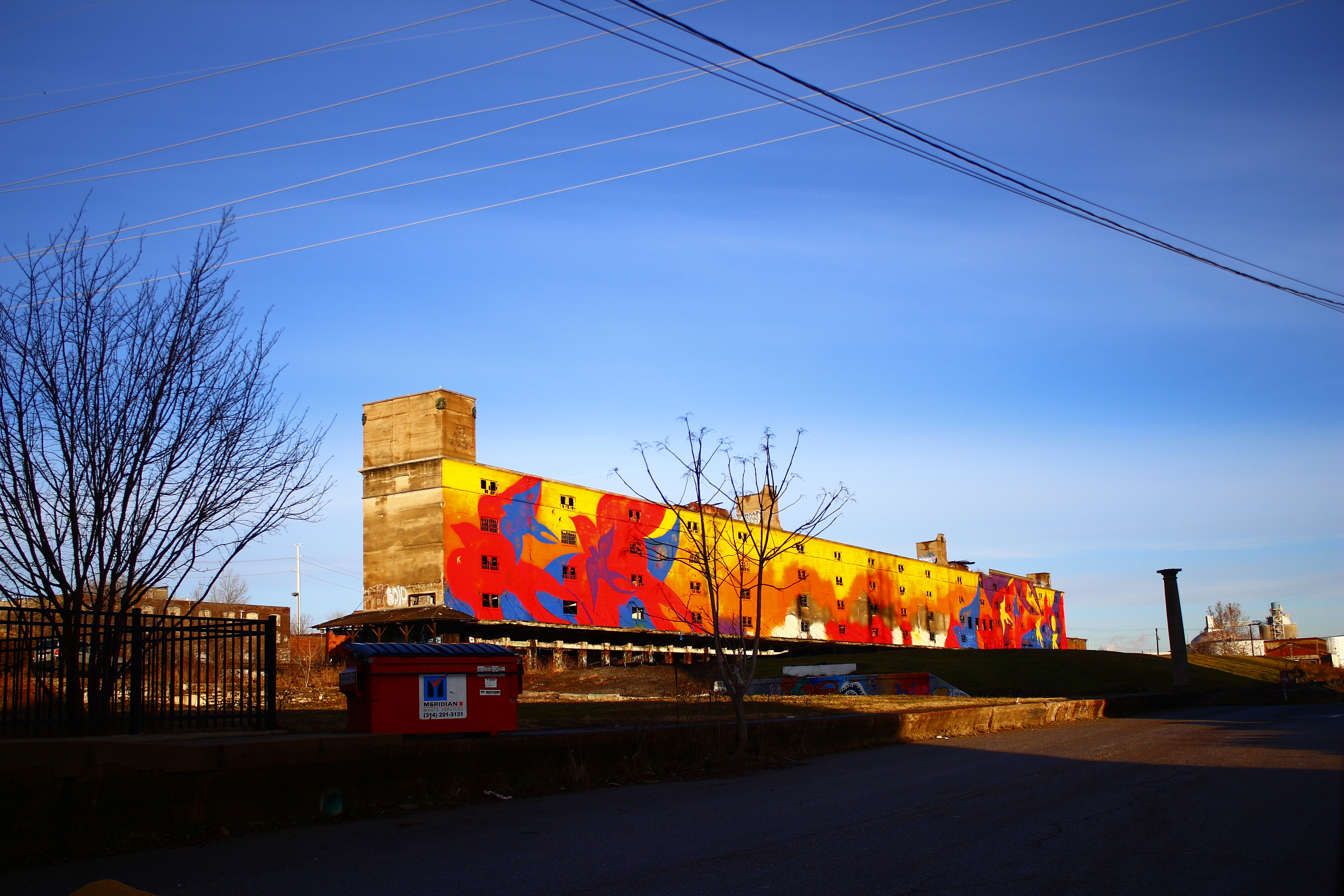
After the "Migrate" mural

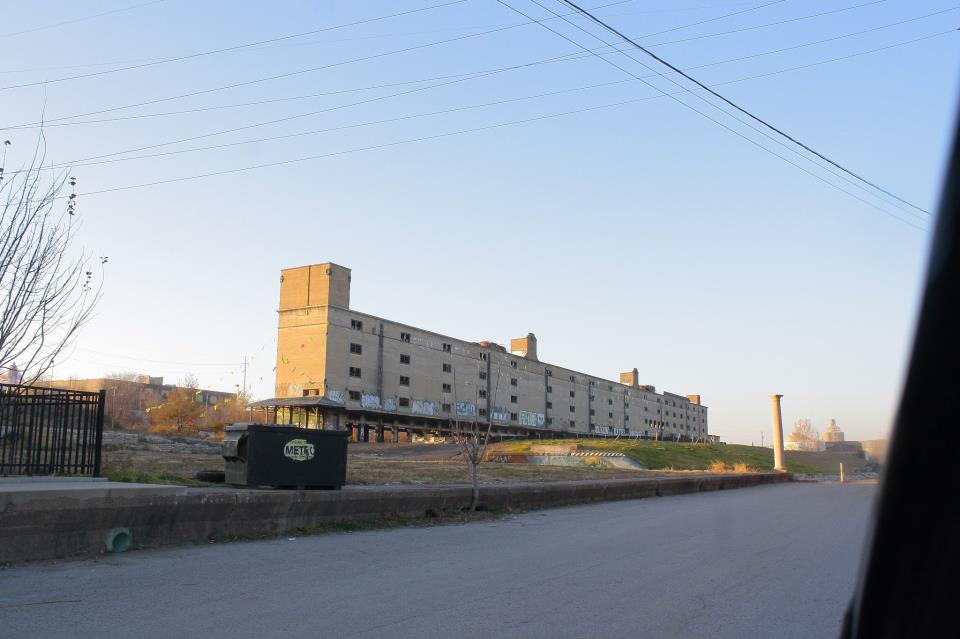
Before the "Migrate" mural

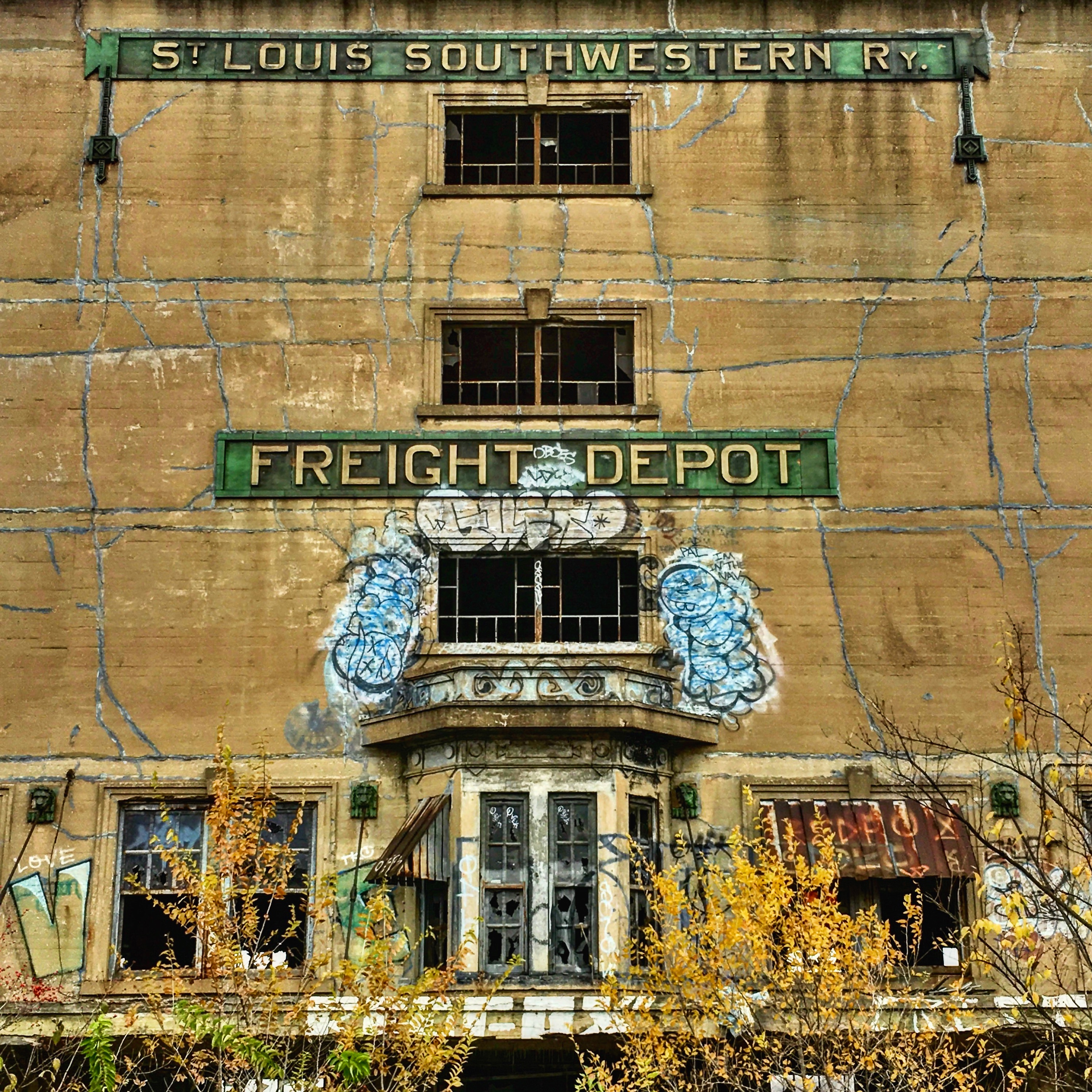
Alternative name on the Western facade
