= Coronado Hotel =

- U.S. National Register of Historic Places
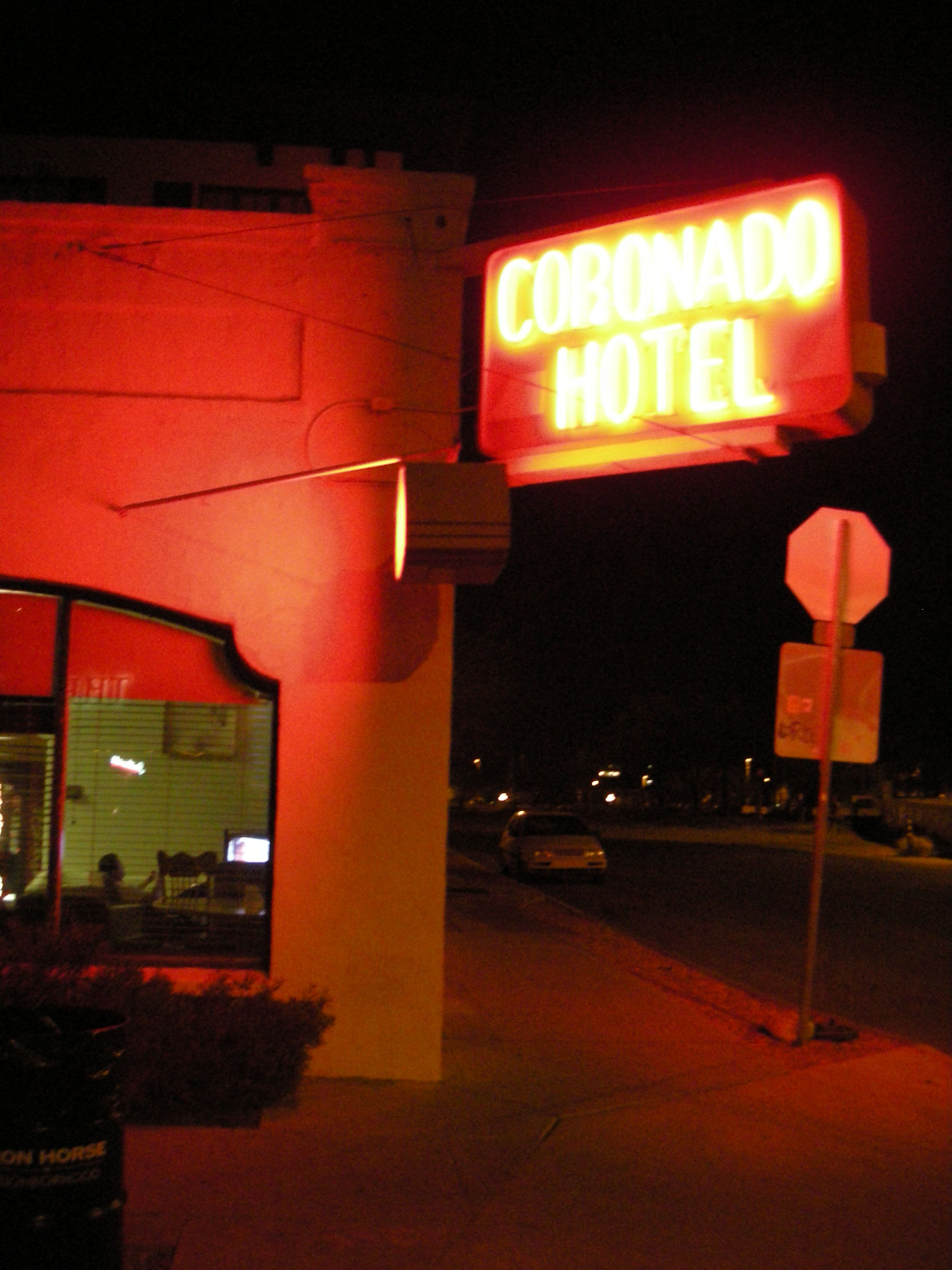

- Location within Arizona
- Location: 410 E. 9th St., Tucson, Arizona
- Coordinates: 32°13′25″N 110°57′52″W
- Area: less than one acre
- Built: 1928
- Architect: Bill Winchester, of T.C. Triplett Company
- Architectural style: Mission/spanish Revival
- NRHP reference No.: 82001622
- Added to NRHP: November 30, 1982

The Coronado Hotel, at 410 E. 9th St. in Tucson, Arizona, was built in 1928. It was listed on the National Register of Historic Places in 1982.

It is a prominent three-story Spanish Colonial-style building. It was built as a 50-room hotel, conveniently just across diagonally from downtown Tucson's Southern Pacific Railroad Company Depot.

It was designed by Bill Winchester, a draftsman at T.C. Triplett Company.
