= Preston J. Bradshaw =

American architect

- Born: 1884; St. Louis, Missouri
- Died: 1953 (aged 68–69)
- Occupation: Architect
- Buildings: Bellerive Apartment Hotel; Brown Hotel; Roberts Mayfair Hotel; Paul Brown Building; The Melbourne Hotel (Jesuit Hall)

Preston J. Bradshaw (1884–1952) was one of the most eminent architects of St. Louis, Missouri, during the 1920s. Among his numerous commissions as an architect, he is best known for designing hotels and automobile dealerships in the region. Like many hotel architects of his time, he eventually moved into the actual operation of hotels, becoming owner and operator of the Coronado Hotel in St. Louis.

== Biography ==
Bradshaw graduated from Columbia University. This was followed by a period working in the office of architect Stanford White in New York City, after which he was a drafter for the Commissioner of Public Buildings of St. Louis. Later Bradshaw opened his own office as an architect.

== Notable commissions: Before 1920 ==
In chronological order by opening date.

- Drake Plaza (1915), 3307 Olive Street, St. Louis, Missouri, also known as Plaza Hotel, and Drake Hotel, six stories. Originally a hotel, the building is now used as apartments.
- Autocar Sales and Service Building (1917), 2745 Locust Street, St. Louis, Missouri, two stories. Listed on the National Register of Historic Places. Autocar was a small manufacturer, and after it ceased operations in 1923, the building was occupied by a succession of other auto-related businesses.

== Notable commissions: 1920s ==
In chronological order by opening date.

- Art Loft (1921), 1531 Washington Avenue, St. Louis, Missouri, 10 stories. This structure was originally an industrial building, now converted into residential living spaces.
- Melbourne Hotel (1921) Currently Jesuit Hall of St. Louis University, 3601 Lindell Boulevard, St. Louis, Missouri, 14 stories, The building serves as a faculty residence.
- Bellerive Apartment Hotel (1922), 214 East Armour Boulevard, Kansas City, Missouri, nine stories, also known as Bellerive Hotel. Listed on the National Register of Historic Places.
- Chase Park Plaza Hotel (1922), 212 North Kingshighway Boulevard, St. Louis, Missouri, 10 stories, originally the Chase Hotel.
- The Westmoreland (1922), 245 Union Boulevard, St. Louis, Missouri, 10 stories,
- Brown Hotel (1923), 337 West Broadway, Louisville, Kentucky, 16 stories. also known as the Camberley Brown Hotel. Listed on the National Register of Historic Places.
- Coronado Hotel (1923), 3701 Lindell Boulevard, St. Louis, Missouri, 15 stories, now known as Coronado Place.
- Forest Park Hotel (1923), 4910 West Pine Boulevard, St. Louis, Missouri, six stories. Listed on the National Register of Historic Places.
- Baker Hotel (1925, demolished in 1980), 1400 Commerce Street, Dallas, Texas, 19 stories.
- Mayfair Hotel (1925), 800 Saint Charles Street, St. Louis, Missouri, 18 stories. Listed on the National Register of Historic Places.
- The Wiltshire and the Versailles Historic Building (1925 to 1926), 724 and 709 S Skinker Blvd., St. Louis, Missouri, buildings with 9 stories and 10 stories, luxury apartments Listed on the National Register of Historic Places.
- Paul Brown Building (1925–1926), 818 Olive Street, St. Louis, Missouri, 16 stories, originally offices and now apartments. Listed on the National Register of Historic Places.
- Vesper-Buick Auto Company Building (1927–1928, demolished in 1995), 3900 West Pine Street, St. Louis, Missouri, two stories. It was noteworthy for its use of the Spanish Colonial Revival style, and was demolished despite being on the National Register of Historic Places.
- Renaissance St. Louis Suites Hotel (1929), 823 Washington Avenue, St. Louis, Missouri, 24 stories. Originally known as Lennox Hotel. Listed on the National Register of Historic Places.

== Notable commissions: 1930s ==
In chronological order by opening date.

- Robert A. Young Federal Building (1933), 1200 Spruce Street, St. Louis, Missouri, 10 stories with a 20-story tower. It had initially been built as a warehouse for the Terminal Railroad Association of St. Louis, and was acquired by the federal government in 1941.

== Notable commissions: 1950s ==
In chronological order by opening date.

- Ford on the Plaza Apartments (1950), 1405 Pine Street, St. Louis, Missouri, 14 stories, also known as Ford Apartments. Listed on the National Register of Historic Places.
