= Bel Air Motel =

Historic motel in St. Louis, Missouri, US

- U.S. National Register of Historic Places
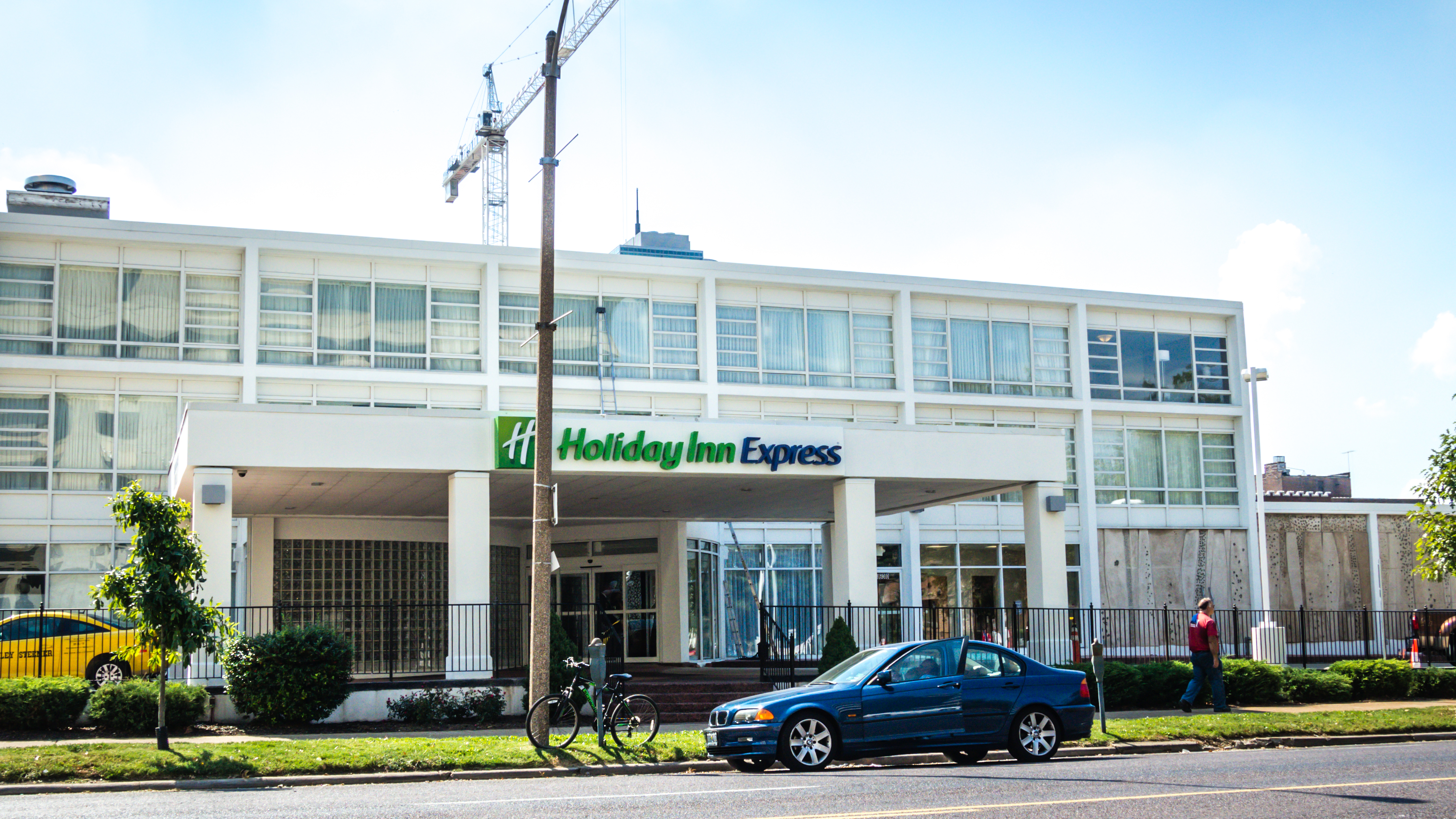
- The former Bel Air Motel building, now a Holiday Inn Express (2014)
- Location: 4630 Lindell Blvd. St. Louis, Missouri, U.S.
- Coordinates: 38°38′34″N 90°15′39″W
- Built: 1957
- Architect: Wilburn C. McCormick
- Architectural style: Modern Movement
- NRHP reference No.: 09000253
- Added to NRHP: May 1, 2009

Bel Air Motel, also known as Bel Air West, is a historic building and motel in the Central West End neighborhood of St. Louis, Missouri.

It was listed on the National Register of Historic Places in 2009. This building is now a Holiday Inn Express after a remodel in 2014.

== History ==
The Bel Air Motel was built in 1957, and is located east of the intersection of Euclid, facing north onto Lindell Boulevard, and north of Forest Park. Lindell Boulevard is primarily a commercial street with a mixture of large, multistoried, office and apartment buildings, but it is also known for its concentration of historic hotels. The buildings are a mixture of those completed in the years associated with the historic development of the Central West End (primarily from the late 1890s through the 1920s), but one of the unique features of this section of Lindell is, that unlike other sections of the city, there was a resurgence of construction after World War II and there is also a concentration of distinctive mid-century modern designs, both in apartment and office buildings, with at least 20 in this 8 block stretch.

The Bel Air Motel was founded by St. Louis hotelier, Norman K. Probstein. Constructed by Westlake Construction Company according to the designs of architect Wilburn C. McComick (1918–2008), the Bel Air Motel was first completed in 1958 with 150 guest rooms. A third story was added across the front in 1959, bringing the total number of guest rooms to 198. The addition continued the basic design of the original two stories and was designed by architectural firm, Russell, Mullgardt, Schwartz, and Van Hoefen (made up of Ernest John Russell, William Oscar Mullgardt, Bernard Schwartz, and Hari Van Hoefen).

The Bel Air Hotel is a three-story building that is a U-shaped structure, with the interior of the U creating the courtyard that originally had a patio and swimming pool for guests. The interior of the hotel is divided into a series of guest rooms flanking a central hallway that runs along the base of the U and rear leg of the U on the first floor as well as down the center of the two upper floors of the front leg of the U.

=== Bel Air East ===
The motel was renamed Bel Air West after the Bel Air East was constructed in 1963 in downtown St. Louis (at Fourth Street and Washington Street). Bel Air East building was taller, and at the time of opening, featured a Trader Vic's restaurant and tiki bar. While the buildings kept the names of Bel Air West and Bel Air East, the company changed its name in 1968 to Bel Air Luxury Motor Inns.

== See also ==
- National Register of Historic Places listings in St. Louis north and west of downtown
