= Herbert Spencer Gasser =

American physiologist (1888–1963)

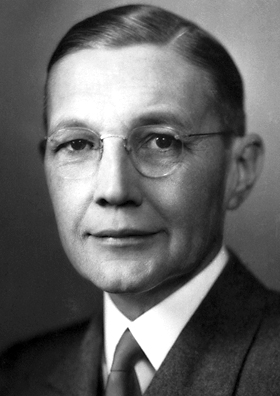
- Gasser in 1944
- Born: July 5, 1888; Platteville, Wisconsin, U.S.
- Died: May 11, 1963 (aged 74); New York City, U.S.
- Education: University of Wisconsin–Madison; Johns Hopkins School of Medicine
- Known for: Action potentials; Nerve fiber analysis
- Awards: Nobel Prize for Physiology or Medicine (1944)
- Scientific career
- Fields: Physiology
- Workplaces: Rockefeller University; Cornell University; Washington University in St. Louis
- Academic advisors: Joseph Erlanger

2nd Director of Rockefeller Institute
- In office 1935–1953
- Preceded by: Simon Flexner
- Succeeded by: Detlev Bronk

Herbert Spencer Gasser (July 5, 1888 – May 11, 1963) was an American physiologist, and recipient of the Nobel Prize for Physiology or Medicine in 1944 for his work with action potentials in nerve fibers while on the faculty of Washington University in St. Louis, awarded jointly with Joseph Erlanger.

== Education ==
Gasser was born in Platteville, Wisconsin, to Herman Gasser and Jane Elisabeth Griswold Gasser. His father was a physician from Dornbirn in the Austrian province of Vorarlberg; his mother was of New England Yankee and German Russian ancestry.

== Biography ==
Gasser attended State Normal School in Platteville, then entered the University of Wisconsin in 1907. Finishing his undergraduate studies in zoology in only two years, he enrolled in the university's medical school in 1909, studying physiology under Joseph Erlanger, and pharmacology under Arthur S. Loevenhart. While still a student, he was named an instructor in pharmacology (1911). Since UW only provided preclinical medical instruction, Gasser transferred to Johns Hopkins School of Medicine in 1913, where he received his medical degree in 1915. He then returned to UW as a pharmacology instructor. In 1916 Gasser moved to the department of physiology at Washington University.

As the United States became involved in World War I and the armies began using chemical warfare, Gasser was urged to contribute his knowledge of human physiology to the subject. Accordingly, in the summer of 1918 he joined the Armed Forces Chemical Warfare Service in Washington D.C. After the Armistice he returned to Washington University, where he was made a professor of pharmacology in 1921.

During the years 1923–1925 Gasser studied in London, Paris and Munich under a Rockefeller Foundation grant, with the goal of improving the caliber of US medical education. After completing these studies he returned to Washington University.

In 1931 Gasser moved to New York City and became a professor of physiology at Cornell Medical College. After four years at that post, he was named the second director of the Rockefeller Institute, following the long tenure of Simon Flexner, who had founded the institute. He remained in that position until 1953. During his tenure there, he was elected a member of the United States National Academy of Sciences, the American Philosophical Society, and the American Academy of Arts and Sciences.

In 1936 Gasser and Erlanger gave a series of lectures at the University of Pennsylvania, summarizing their investigations into the actions of human nerve cells. This work led to their recognition in 1944, when they jointly received the Nobel Prize (Gasser used his prize money to fund further research into the subject).

After his retirement from the Rockefeller Institute in 1953, Gasser continued his research. He published over 100 scientific papers during his lifetime. He died in New York City on May 11, 1963.
