= Herman Dreer =

American author (1888–1981)

- Born: September 12, 1889; Washington, D.C., U.S.
- Died: August 7, 1981 (aged 91)
- Other names: Herman H. Dreer, Herman S. Dreer
- Education: Bowdoin College, Virginia University of Lynchburg, University of Chicago
- Occupations: Academic administrator, educator, educational reformer, educational activist, author, editor, minister, civil rights leader
- Known for: 20th-century African American History curriculum and programming for public school
- Spouse: Mary Thomas (m. 1912–?)
- Children: 2

Herman H. Dreer (1888–1981) was an American academic administrator, educator, educational reformer, activist, author, editor, Baptist minister, and civil rights leader. He is best known for writing curriculum and programming for teaching African American History at most grade levels for early 20th-century public schools. Dreer is also credited with initiating Black History Month observance in the United States, alongside Carter G. Woodson.

Dreer re-opened Douglass University, and he founded a bank for African Americans in St. Louis, Missouri. His former home is listed on the National Register of Historic Places since February 2009.

== Early life and education ==
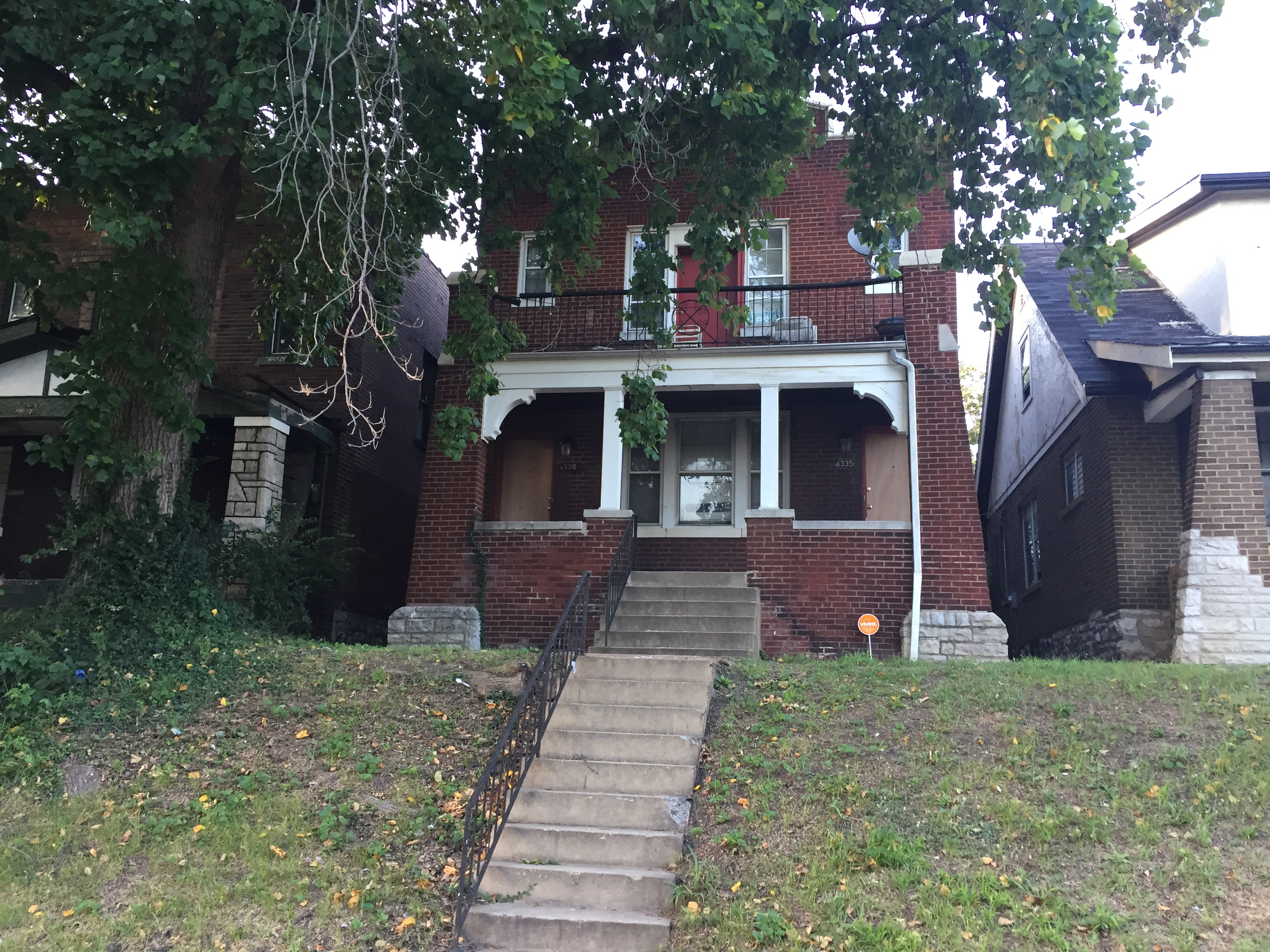
Dr. Herman S. Dreer House in 2017

Herman Dreer was born on September 12, 1889, in Washington, D.C. Dreer graduated from Bowdoin College in Brunswick, Maine. He earned a master's degree in Latin theology from the Virginia Theological Seminary (now Virginia University of Lynchburg). He had been a member of the academic honor society, Phi Beta Kappa.

He was denied admission to state universities in Missouri because he was African American. In 1955 he received a PhD in sociology from the University of Chicago, his PhD. thesis was titled "Negro Leadership in St. Louis: A Study in Race Relations".

== Career ==
In 1914, Dreer moved to St. Louis, where he taught at Sumner High School. He realized in his early teaching experience that most Black students did not have an understanding of African American history, and in some cases they had a negative feeling towards the subject. Dreer saw this as an opportunity to formalize a teaching method for the subject. He was a staunch supporter of W. E. B. Du Bois' double-consciousness theory (1903). Dreer taught in the St. Louis Public Schools from 1915 to 1959; and at Stowe Teachers College (now Harris–Stowe State University) from 1930 to 1942). He was the assistant principal of Sumner High School from 1930 to 1945. In 1965, Dreer was a visiting professor at MacMurray College in Jacksonville, Illinois.

He wrote the African American History curriculum and programming for the schools, spanning from elementary school level to college level. Topics covered included Ancient Egyptians, the shaping of Africa, and the developments of East African nations, all of which was considered radical at the time. He also created resources for teachers of all grade levels on the topic.

Dreer wrote for newspapers including the Black-owned St. Louis Argus, where he had a weekly column "Highlights of Negro History". He wrote for Carter G. Woodson's journal of "Negro History". He edited a collection of African American writings, American Literature by Negro Authors anthology (Dreer, 1946).

After the retirement of B. F. Bowles at Douglass University (in St. Louis, Missouri), Dreer re-opened the college in 1934; as well the Carter G. Woodson School for Negro History, a Saturday morning course at Annie Malone's Poro Beauty College. These two opportunities were community-based programs that allowed further expansion of Black educational opportunities during the time of racial segregation, and Douglass was the only Black college in the city at the time.

He directed of several pageant events many of which were popular during the St. Louis Negro History Week, and these carried as memory aids for Black communities. He was an organizer of the 39th annual meeting of the Association for the Study of Negro Life and History in St. Louis. Dreer served as a minister of the King's Way Baptist Church in St. Louis, Missouri from 1950 to 1970.

== Personal life ==
He married Mary Thomas, a former student in 1912, and together they had two daughters.

The Dr. Herman S. Dreer House at 4335 Cote Brilliante Avenue, St. Louis was added to the National Register of Historic Places in 2009. The State Historical Society of Missouri has a collection of Dreer's papers.

== Publications ==
- Dreer, Herman (1919). The Immediate Jewel of His Soul. St. Louis, Mo.: The St. Louis Argus publishing company. OCLC 3808333.
- Dreer, Herman (1931). Sunrise: A Drama in Four Acts.
- Dreer, Herman (1940). The History of Omega Psi Phi Fraternity: A Brotherhood of Negro College Men, 1911 to 1939. Omega Psi Phi.
- Dreer, Herman (October 1940). "What Does the Innocent Teacher Impart as History?". In Franklin, V.P. (ed.). The Journal of African American History. Vol. 25. pp. 474–483.
- Dreer, Herman, ed. (1950). American Literature by Negro Authors. New York City, NY: MacMillan.
- Dreer, Herman (1955). Negro Leadership in St. Louis: A Study in Race Relations (dissertation). University of Chicago.
- Dreer, Herman (1958). The Tie That Binds. St. Louis, MO.: Meador Publisher.

== See also ==
- National Register of Historic Places listings in St. Louis north and west of downtown
- Sumner High School
- The Ville
