= Don Kaverman =

Former American college athletics administrator for various colleges

Biographical details
- Education: Michigan State University

Administrative career (AD unless noted)
- 1988–1995: San Diego State (associate AD)
- 1995–1999: Missouri Western
- 1999–2008: Southeast Missouri State
- 2010–2014: Harris–Stowe

Don Kaverman is a former American college athletics administrator. Kaverman served as athletic director at Harris–Stowe State University from 2010 to 2014, as athletic director at Southeast Missouri State University from 1999 to 2008, as athletic director at Missouri Western State University from 1995 to 1999, and as an associate athletic director at San Diego State University from 1988 to 1995. Prior to his career in college athletics administration, Kaverman previously had a career background in sports medicine, serving as head athletic trainer at San Diego State University, coordinator of sports medicine at Ferris State University, conditioning coordinator and assistant athletic trainer for the NFL's Detroit Lions, and assistant athletic trainer at Northwestern University. Kaverman is a graduate of Michigan State University, holding a bachelor's degree in business administration and a master's degree in physical education from Michigan State.
