= Antioch Baptist Church =

Antioch Baptist Church can refer to:

- Antioch Baptist Church (Montgomery, Alabama), the first Baptist church in Montgomery
- Antioch Baptist Church (Shreveport, Louisiana), listed on the U.S. National Register of Historic Places (NRHP)
- Antioch Baptist Church (St. Louis, Missouri), also NRHP-listed
- Antioch Baptist Church (Cleveland, Ohio), influential church, site of a progressive AIDs program.
- Antioch Baptist Church (Washington, D.C.), in the Northeast section of the city on 50th Street
- Antioch Missionary Baptist Church, Downtown Houston, Texas.
