= William H. J. Beckett =

American football coach

Biographical details
- Born: 1882; Philadelphia, Pennsylvania, U.S.
- Died: March 15, 1954 (aged 71); St. Louis, Missouri, U.S.
- Education: International YMCA (BA, 1906); Pennsylvania (MA)

Coaching career (HC unless noted)
- 1917: Howard

Administrative career (AD unless noted)
- 1917: Howard

Head coaching record
- Overall: 0–4

William Henry Jackson Beckett (1882 – March 15, 1954) was an American football coach.

== Springfield YMCA Training School ==
Becket was the first African American person to ever be awarded a degree at Springfield College–then known as the International YMCA Training School–in Springfield, Massachusetts. He was awarded the school's Tarbell Medallion in 1947.

== Howard University ==
Beckett became the head football coach and first full-time athletic director at Howard University in Washington, D.C. in 1917.

== Late life and death ==
Beckett taught physical education at Sumner High School in St. Louis for 35 years before retiring in 1954. He died of a cerebral hemorrhage on March 15, 1954, at Homer G. Phillips Hospital in St. Louis.

== Head coaching record ==
Year	Team	Overall	Conference	Standing	Bowl/playoffs
Howard Bison (Colored Intercollegiate Athletic Association) (1917)
1917	Howard	0–4	0–3	4th	
Howard:		0–4	0–3		
Total:		0–4			
