= Lieutenant (United States) =

United States of America military rank

- Insignia of the rank of Lieutenant (O-3) USN, USCG, USPHS, NOAA Corps
- Country: United States
- Service branch: United States Navy; United States Coast Guard; United States Public Health Service Commissioned Corps; NOAA Commissioned Officer Corps; US Maritime Service
- Abbreviation: LT
- Rank group: Junior Officer
- NATO rank code: OF-2
- Pay grade: O-3
- Next higher rank: Lieutenant commander
- Next lower rank: Lieutenant junior grade
- Equivalent ranks: Captain (USA, USMC, USAF, USSF)

The military rank of lieutenant is the commissioned officer rank title associated with pay grades O-3 in the United States Armed Forces military branches of the United States Navy and the United States Coast Guard. And while pay grade O-2 is often referred to as a "lieutenant" in address, the rank is Lieutenant, Junior Grade.

It is also used in the commissioned officer ranks of the United States Uniformed Services of the National Oceanic and Atmospheric Administration with their National Oceanic and Atmospheric Administration Commissioned Officer Corps (NOAA-COO), and the medical arm of the United States Public Health Service with their United States Public Health Service Commissioned Corps (PHS-CC).

The two ranks referred to as lieutenant the following:

- Lieutenant (pay grade O-3), abbreviated as LT and equivalent to a Captain in the U.S. Army, U.S. Marine Corps, U.S. Air Force and U.S. Space Force
- Lieutenant, junior grade (pay grade O-2), abbreviated as LTJG and sometimes referred as "JG" It is equivalent to the rank of First Lieutenant (O-2), sometimes called simply "lieutenant," in the United States Army, Marine Corps, Air Force, and Space Force.

Neither of the above naval style ranks should be confused with the rank of Second Lieutenant (pay grade O-1), in the U.S. Army, Air Force, Marine Corps and Space Force, which is equivalent to the rank of Ensign in the Navy, Coast Guard, NOAA-COO & PHS-CC.

== History ==
Navy Lieutenant rank came to the US Navy from the British Royal Navy and were a part of the service since 1775. Navy lieutenants ranked above Masters and below Captains. They have worn the two stripes of gold on their sleeves since 1874.

== US Maritime Services ==
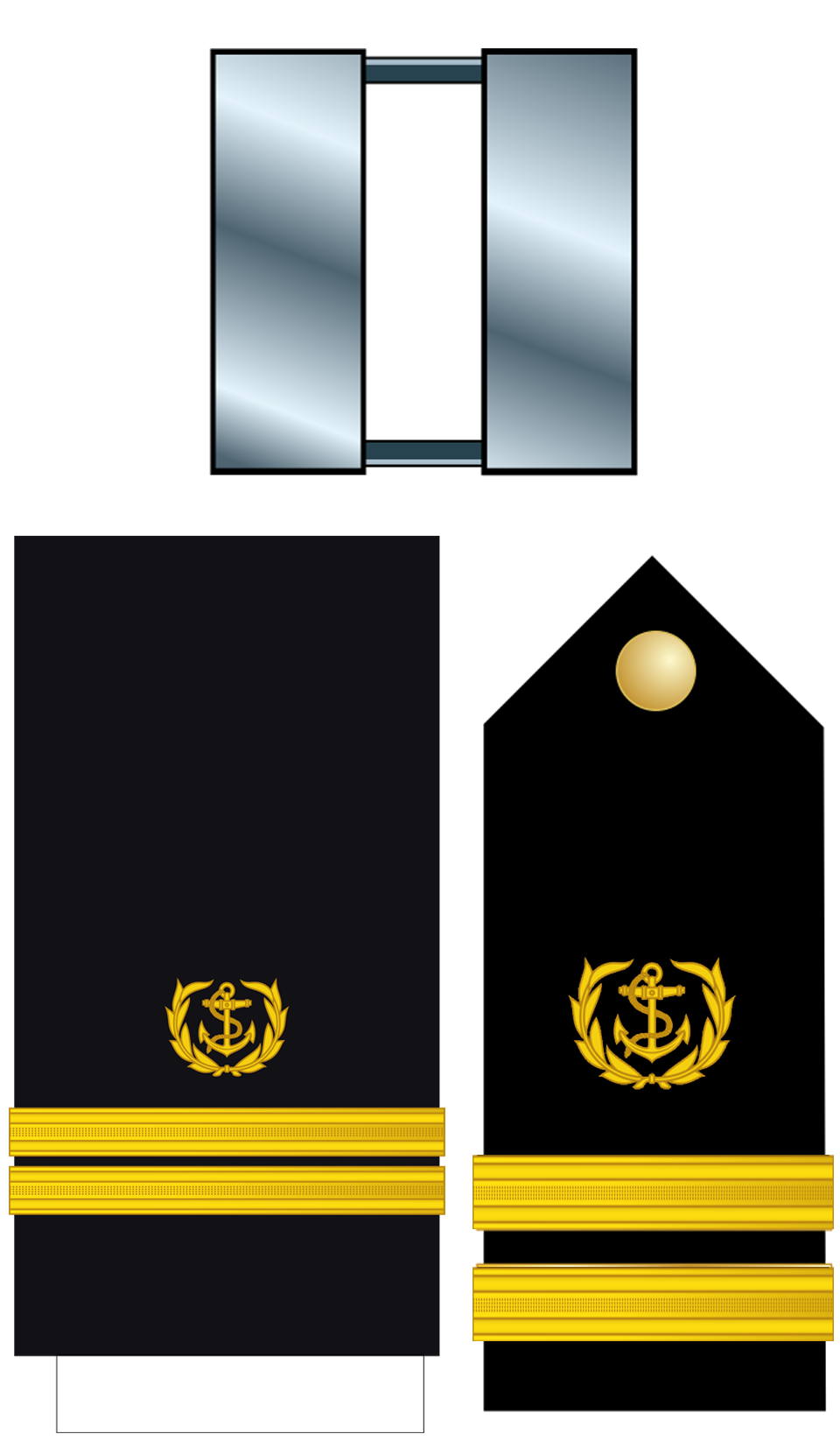
USMS Lieutenant

In the United States Maritime Services (USMS) - a voluntary training organization of the U.S. Department of Transportation - Lieutenant is the third junior officer rank. USMS officers are commissioned into the Naval Reserve after attending the U.S. Merchant Marine Academy or one of the other six maritime academies into the ranks of the U.S. Navy Strategic Sealift Officer Corps. Many US Maritime Services officers serve at the academy or the other six schools as faculty.

== Other uses ==
Civilian police and fire departments in the United States may also use the rank of lieutenant.

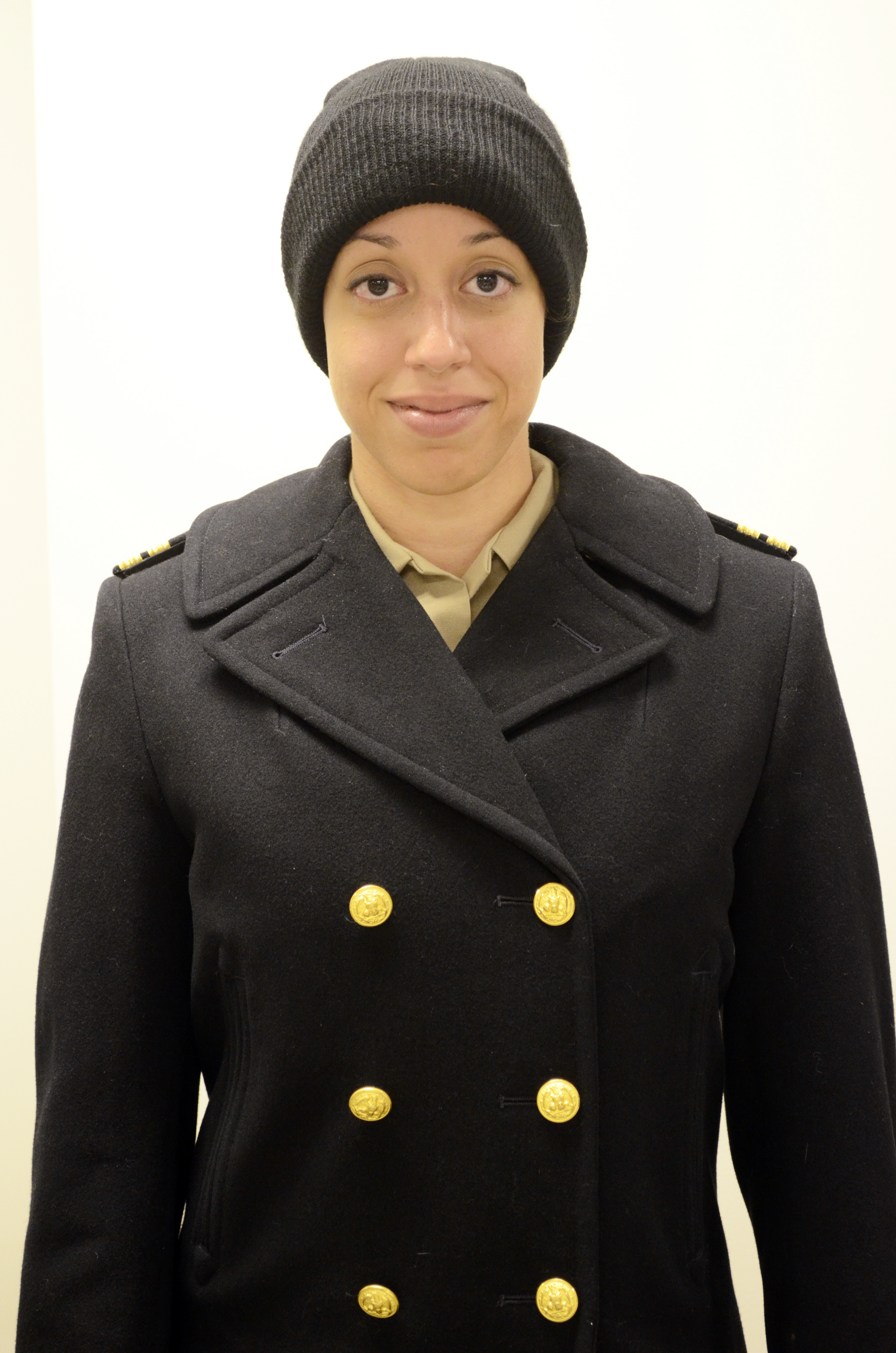
A lieutenant of the United States Navy

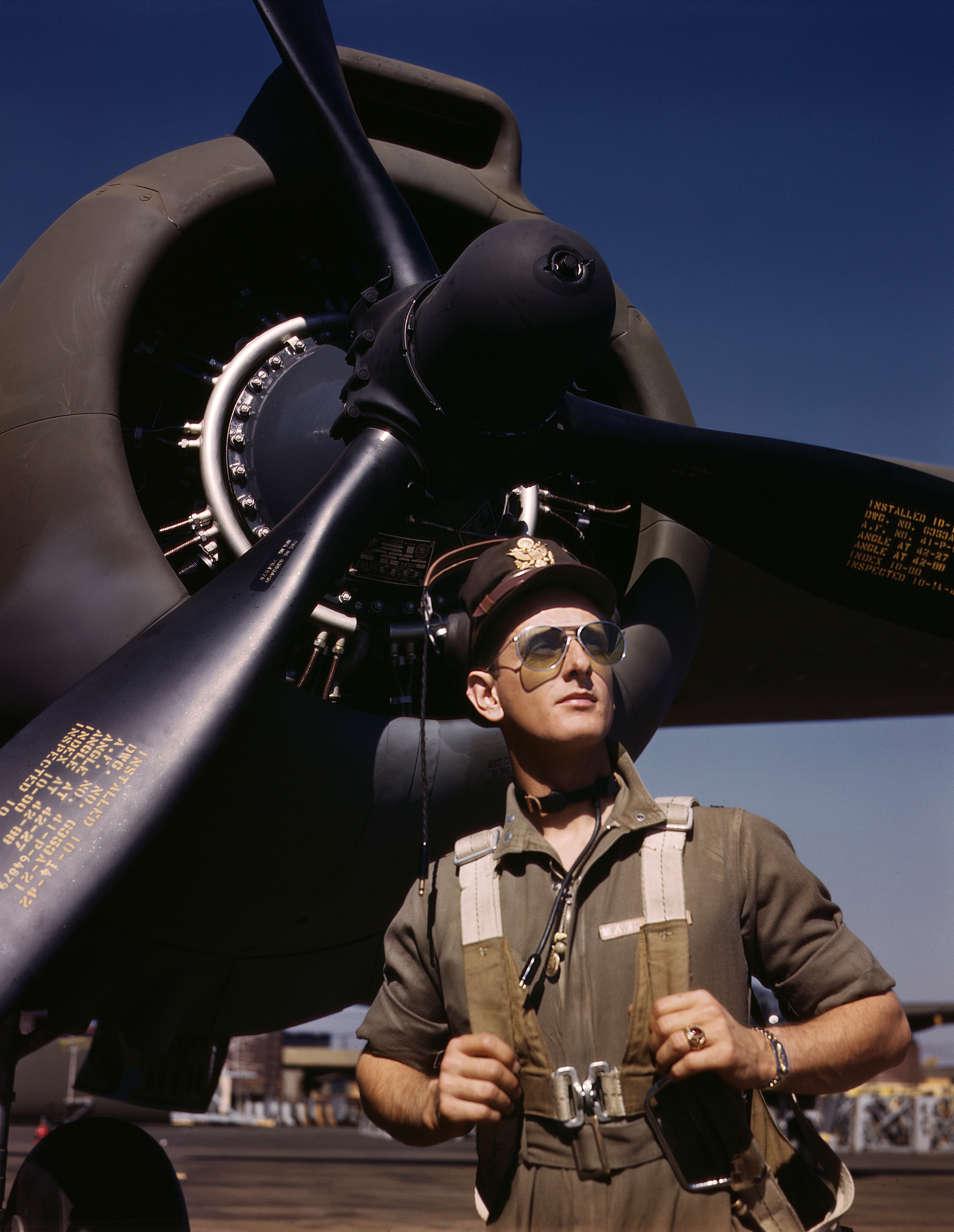
A lieutenant of the United States Army

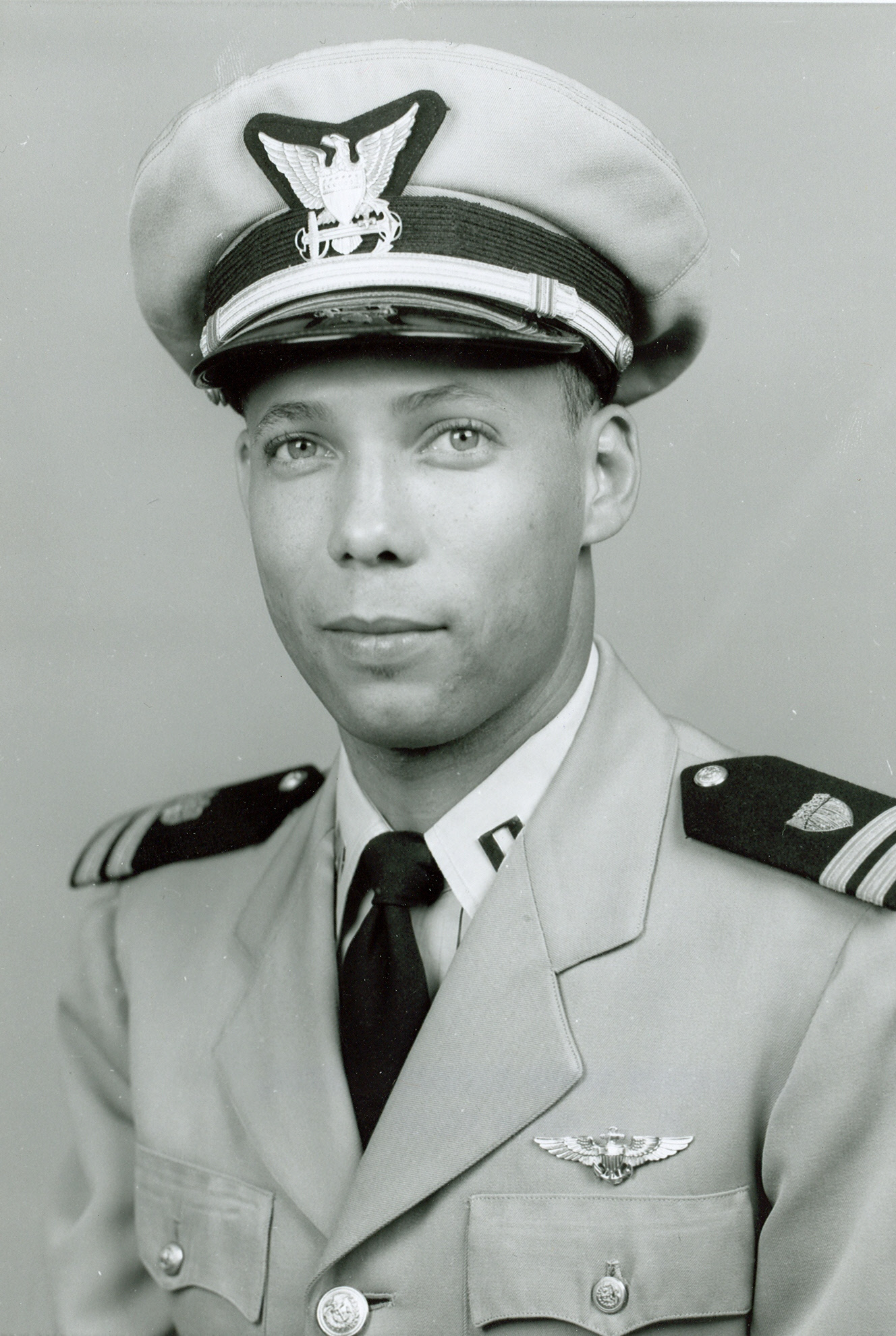
United States Coast Guard Lieutenant Bobby Wilks

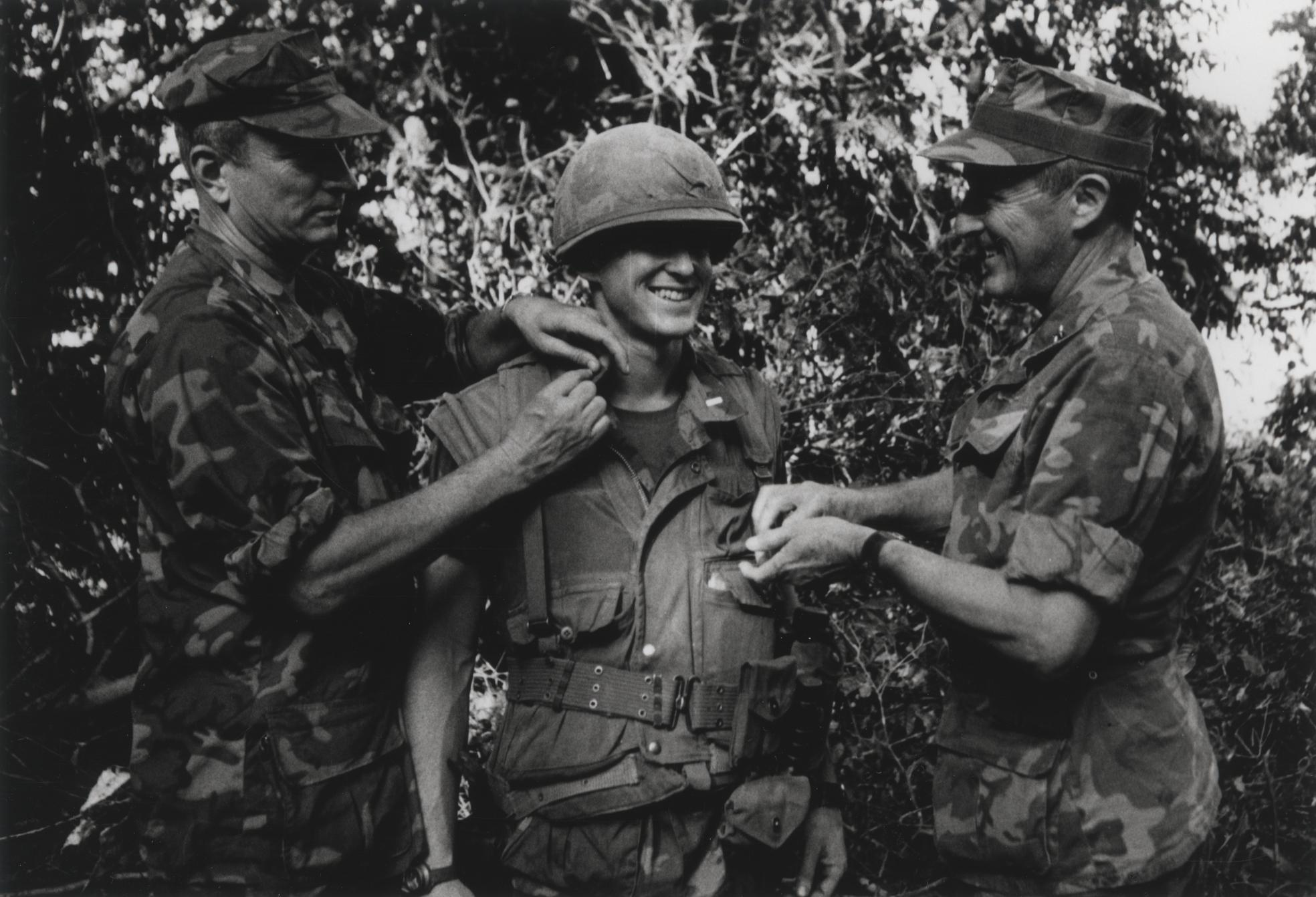
A United States Marine receives a promotion to first lieutenant

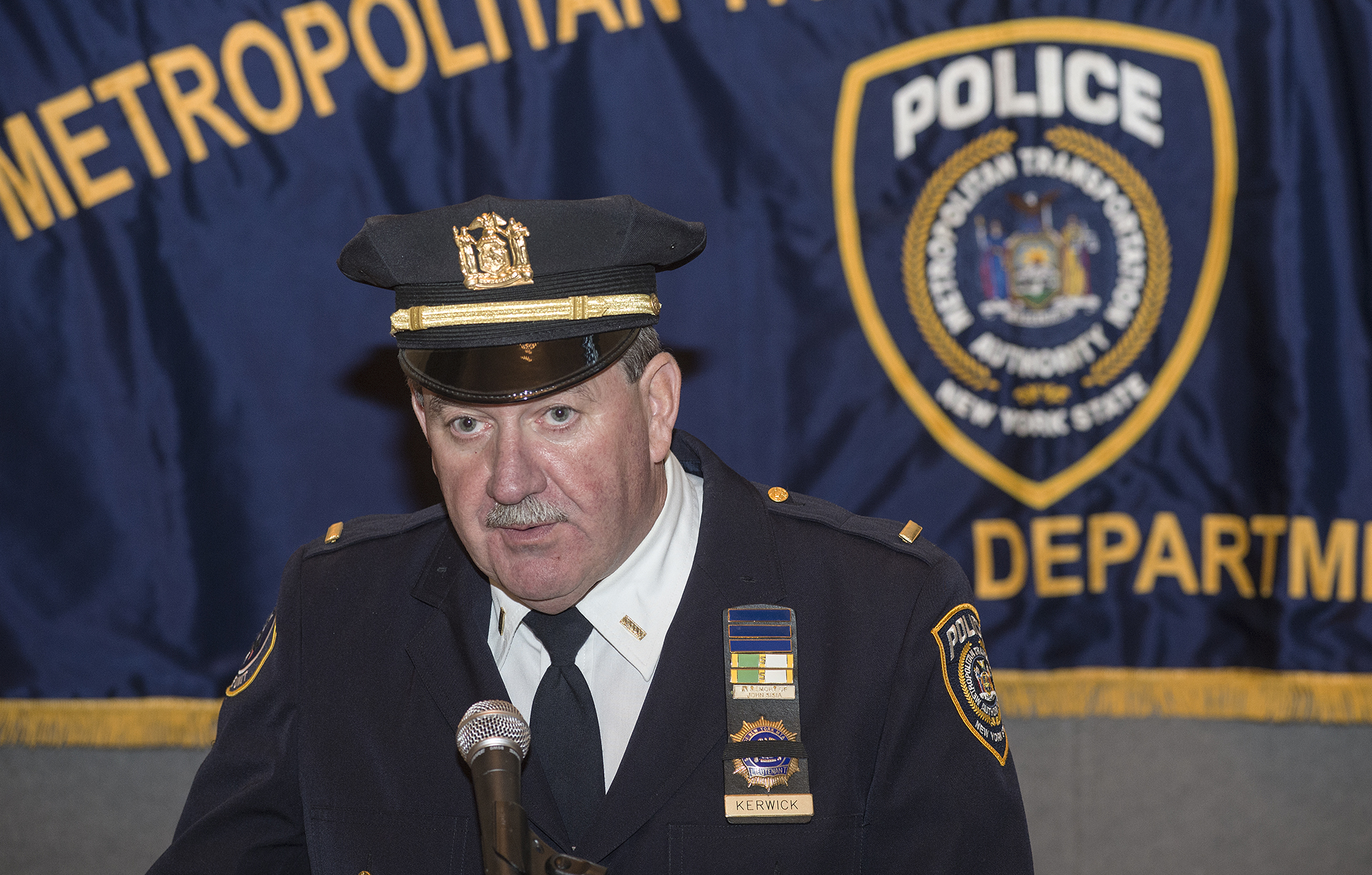
A lieutenant of the New York Metropolitan Transportation Authority Police
