= Fields Foods =

Fields Foods was a grocery store chain operating in the St. Louis, Missouri area.

In January 2014, Fields Foods opened its first store, a 37,000-square-foot location on Lafayette Avenue in the Peabody–Darst–Webbe, St. Louis neighborhood. Fields Foods opened a store in the Downtown West neighborhood in April 2019 and another in the Central West End in August 2019. In April 2022, Fields Foods opened its fourth location in the Clayton–Tamm neighborhood. Fields Foods opened its fifth location in the Skinker DeBaliviere neighborhood in February 2023. In October 2022, Fields Foods closed its Central West End store and later re-opened it as a liquor store, allegedly in violation of the lease. Fields Foods opened its 20,000-square-foot Pagedale store in March 2023 at the location of a former Save-a-Lot.

In July 2023, Fields Foods closed its Pagedale location. Owner Chris Goodson announced he was in talks to sell the five stores to an employee ownership group. The Skinker DeBaliviere location closed later that month.

That same month, the city collector of revenue filed suit against Fields Foods alleging it owed $92,000 in delinquent taxes. Three of its landlords were separately also in the process of suing Fields Foods for late rent totaling over $2 million.

Fields Foods in Clayton–Tamm closed in August of 2023.

== Model ==
Fields Foods favors locations in food deserts. As of 2014, Fields Foods planned to open as many as two dozen locations in the St. Louis area.

As of 2026, all Fields Foods have closed and the company is no longer operating.
