= Dr. Herman S. Dreer House =

Historic house in St. Louis, Missouri, U.S.

- U.S. National Register of Historic Places
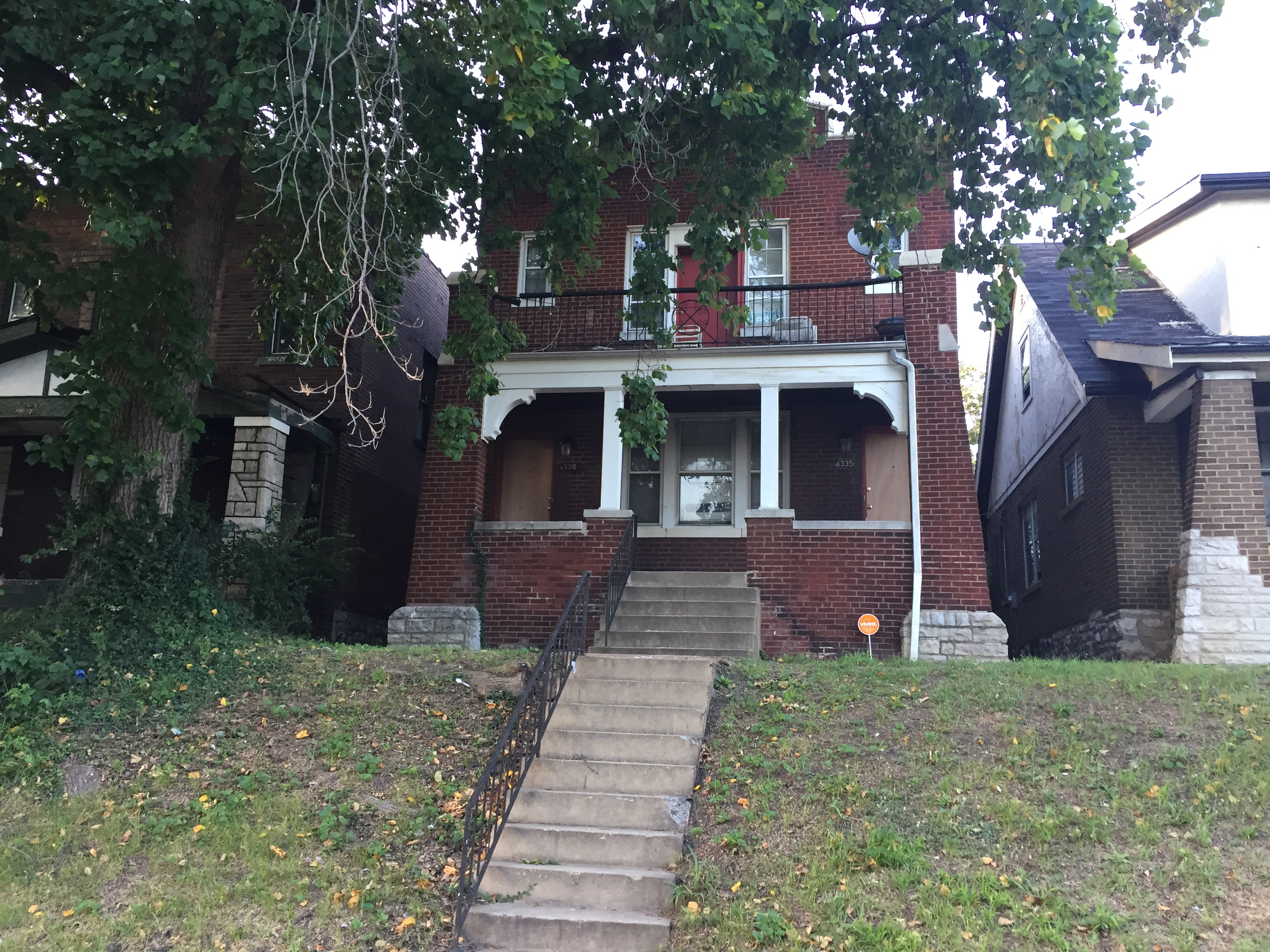
- Dr. Herman S. Dreer House in 2017

- Location within Missouri Location within the United States
- Location: 4335 Cote Brilliante Ave., St. Louis, Missouri 63113
- Coordinates: 38.6583°N 90.2432°W
- Area: less than 1 acre
- Built: 1930
- Architectural style: American Craftsman
- NRHP reference No.: 09000035
- Added to NRHP: February 20, 2009

The Dr. Herman S. Dreer House is a historic building built in 1930 and located at 4335 Cote Brilliante Avenue in The Ville neighborhood of St. Louis, Missouri.

Herman Dreer and his family, resided in one of the units from 1930 to 1952; and they used the second unit as a rental. Dreer's children retained ownership of the building until 2000.

It has been listed as one of the National Register of Historic Places since February 20, 2009 for African American ethnic heritage and education. As of 2012, the rest of the city block is part of the National Register-listed Marshall School Neighborhood in The Ville Historic District.

== See also ==
- National Register of Historic Places listings in St. Louis north and west of downtown
