= Homer G. Phillips Hospital =

Geography
- Location: St. Louis, Missouri, United States

Organization
- Type: African American General Hospital

Services
- Beds: 177

History
- Opened: 1937
- Closed: 1979

Links
- Lists: Hospitals in Missouri
- Homer G. Phillips Hospital
- U.S. National Register of Historic Places
- St. Louis Landmark
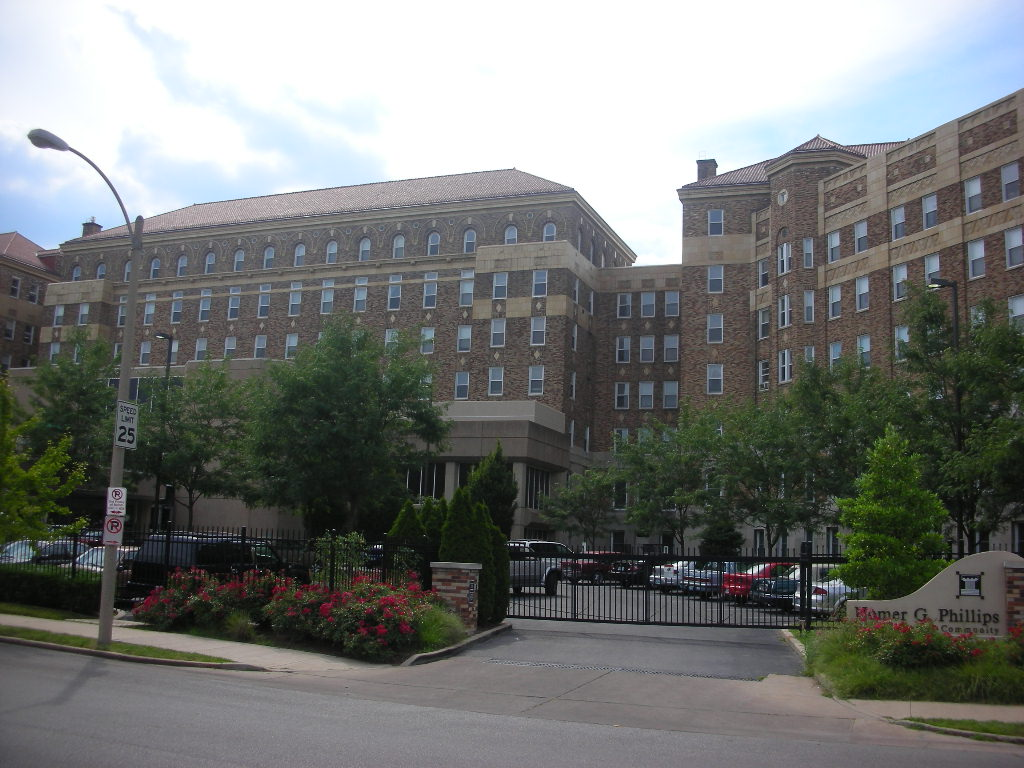
- Homer G. Phillips Hospital

- Location within St. Louis Location within Missouri Location within the United States
- Location: 2601 N. Whittier Street. St. Louis, MO, United States
- Coordinates: 38°39′31″N 90°14′10″W
- Area: 10 acres (4.0 ha)
- Built: 1937
- Architect: Albert A. Osburg
- Architectural style: Art deco
- NRHP reference No.: 82004738

Homer G. Phillips Hospital was the only public hospital for African Americans in St. Louis, Missouri from 1937 until 1955, when the city began to desegregate. It continued to operate after the desegregation of city hospitals, and continued to serve the Black community of St. Louis until its closure in 1979. It was named for St. Louis lawyer and civil rights advocate Homer G. Phillips who helped plan it.

Located at 2601 N. Whittier Street in The Ville neighborhood, it was the first teaching hospital west of the Mississippi River to serve the city's Black residents. By 1961, Homer G. Phillips Hospital had trained the "largest number of Black doctors and nurses in the world." It closed as a full-service hospital in 1979. While vacant, it was listed as a St. Louis Landmark in 1980 and on the National Register of Historic Places in 1982.

After being adapted for residential use, it reopened as senior living apartments in 2003.

== History ==
=== Construction ===
Between 1910 and 1920, the black population of St. Louis increased by sixty percent, as rural migrants came North in the Great Migration to take industrial jobs, yet the public City Hospital served only whites, and had no facilities for black patients or staff.

A group of black community leaders persuaded the city in 1919 to purchase a 177-bed hospital (formerly owned by Barnes Medical College) in Mill Creek Valley at Garrison and Lawton avenues to serve African Americans. This hospital, denoted City Hospital #2, was inadequate to the needs of the more than 70,000 black St. Louisans. Local black attorney Homer G. Phillips led a campaign for a civic improvements bond issue that would provide for the construction of a larger hospital for blacks.

When the bond issue was passed in 1923, the city refused to allocate funding for the hospital, instead advocating a segregated addition to the original City Hospital, located in the Peabody-Darst-Webbe neighborhood and distant from the center of black population. Phillips again led the efforts to implement the original plan for a new hospital, successfully debating the St. Louis Board of Aldermen for allocation of funds to this purpose. Site acquisition resulted in the purchase of 6.3 acres in the Ville, the center of the black community of St. Louis. But, before construction could begin, Homer G. Phillips was shot and killed. Although two men were arrested and charged with the crime, they were acquitted; and Phillips' murder remains unsolved.

Construction on the site began in October 1932, with the city initially using funds from the 1923 bond issue and later from the newly formed Public Works Administration. City architect Albert A. Osburg was the primary designer of the building, which was completed in phases. Osburg also designed the nearby Tandy Community Center. The central building was finished between 1933 and 1935, while the two wings were finished between 1936 and 1937. The hospital was dedicated on February 22, 1937, with a parade and speeches by Missouri Governor Lloyd C. Stark, St. Louis Mayor Bernard Francis Dickmann, and Secretary of the Interior Harold L. Ickes. Speaking to the black community of St. Louis, Ickes noted that the hospital would help the community "achieve your rightful place in our economic system." It was renamed in 1942 from City Hospital #2 to Homer G. Phillips, in his honor.

=== Operation ===
Although by 1944 the hospital ranked among the ten largest general hospitals in the United States, it was consistently underfunded and understaffed by the city. By 1948, its medical residents included more than one third of all graduates, including Dr. Helen Elizabeth Nash, from the two American black medical schools. In the 1940s and 1950s it was a leader in developing the practice of intravenous feeding and treatments for gunshot wounds, ulcers, and burns. Not only did it house a nursing school, but also schools for training x-ray technicians, laboratory technicians and medical record-keeping. It also began offering training and work to foreign doctors who were being denied by other hospitals because of their race.

After a 1955 order by Mayor Raymond Tucker to desegregate city hospitals, Homer G. Phillips began admitting patients regardless of race, color or religious beliefs. However, it remained a primarily black institution into the 1960s, by tradition and because of the ethnic character of its neighborhood. In 1960, each department of the hospital was staffed by at least one black doctor who also was a staff member of either Washington University in St. Louis or Saint Louis University, and in 1962, three-fourths of the interns at the hospital were black.

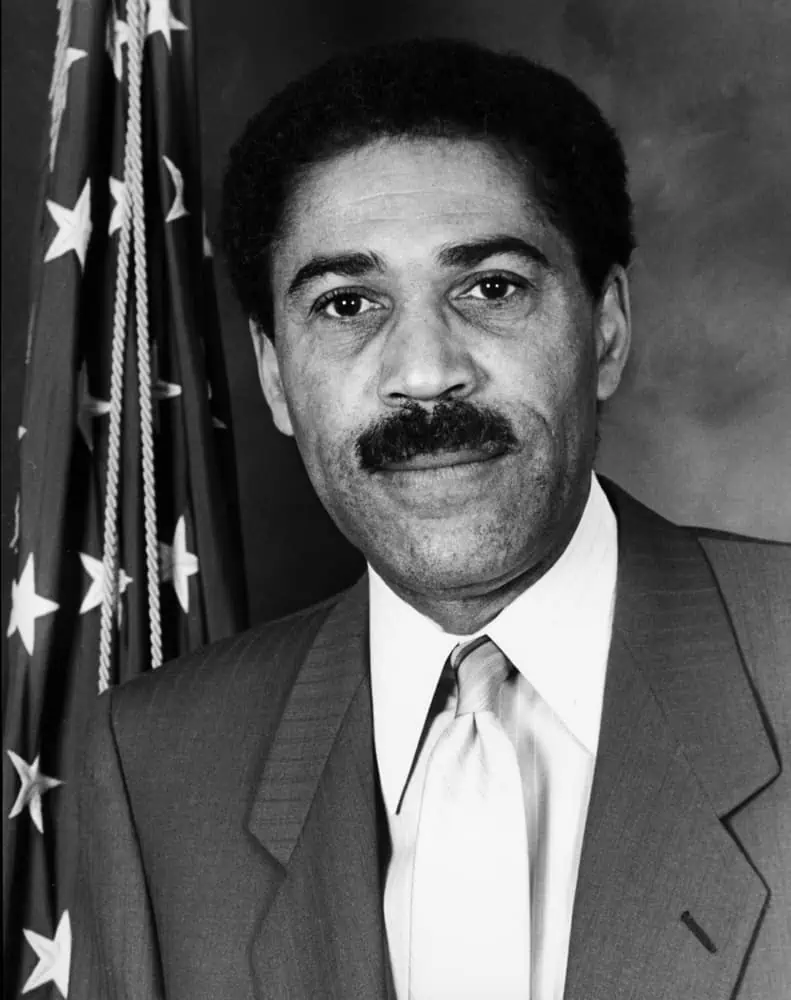
William Lacy Clay, Sr., leader of opposition to the closure of Homer G. Phillips Hospital

=== Closure ===
As early as 1961, proposals were made to merge Homer G. Phillips with City Hospital. Although some leaders in the black community opposed the idea (such as William Lacy Clay, Sr., then a city alderman and later U.S. representative for Missouri's 1st district), others accepted the notion. Local NAACP official Ernest Calloway said, "Giving up the hospital may be the price we have to pay for an integrated community." By the mid-1960s, efforts were underway to reduce services at the hospital or close it entirely. In the late 1960s, St. Louis city moved the neurological and psychiatric departments of Homer G. Phillips to City Hospital, citing the low pay at Homer G. Phillips and distance from Washington University staff who were affiliated with City Hospital as reasons for the move.

From 1964 until 1979, no other departments were moved. However, on August 17, 1979, St. Louis abruptly closed all departments at Homer G. Phillips Hospital except for a small outpatient care clinic housed in an adjacent building. The community responded with protests, and more than a hundred police officers were required to control the crowd and to escort remaining patients out. William Lacy Clay, Sr. led opposition to the closure, and many in the community charged that the closure was racially motivated. Picketing and protests outside the hospital continued for more than a year after the closure, and a community group called Campaign for Human Dignity was formed to continue the movement. Mayor James F. Conway commissioned a task force to study the issue of the hospital, but nothing resulted of the plan. The protests were ultimately unsuccessful in reopening the hospital.

In the midst of the protests, the hospital was listed by the St. Louis Board of Aldermen as a St. Louis Landmark in February 1980. In 1981, after a contentious primary with incumbent Mayor Conway, Alderman Vincent Schoemehl was elected mayor of St. Louis on a campaign promising to reopen Homer G. Phillips. Instead, Schoemehl deferred to the Conway task force. The next year, the hospital was listed on the National Register of Historic Places in 1982 for its significance in architecture, education and to black history. But in June 1985, Schoemehl ordered the closure of all municipal hospital services, both at City Hospital and at the clinic at Homer G. Phillips. St. Louis area public hospital services were consolidated in nearby Clayton, Missouri, and the Homer G. Phillips complex was totally vacated.

=== Renovation ===
In 1988, developer William Thomas began negotiations to convert the former Homer G. Phillips Hospital into a nursing home, but these efforts failed when agreements to lease the property stalled. The property was abandoned until 1991, when the city reopened the adjacent clinic. The former nurses' building behind the main hospital also was reopened as an addition to Annie Malone Children's Home. However, the main building remained vacant.

In 1998, the daughter of William Thomas, Sharon Thomas Robnett, renewed negotiations with the city to convert the building into a low-income nursing home and apartments for the elderly. She signed a 99-year lease on the property.

In December 2001, renovations began on the main building through Robnett's development company, W.A.T. Dignity Corp., and Dominium Management Services, continuing through July 2003. The renovation project, led by architects of the Fleming Corporation, cost more than $42 million and produced a 220-unit supervised facility for the elderly, named Homer G. Phillips Dignity House. In response to focus groups, the developers upgraded security measures at the site, including adding a perimeter fence, surveillance cameras, and remote keyless entry. Homer G Phillips is a fully independent senior living facility for individuals age 55 plus. The Facility offers amenities which include a mini-mart grocery store, beauty and barber salon, computer lab, fully equipped exercise facility, and much more.

== Architecture ==
The original Homer G. Phillips complex includes a main central building, four wards connected to the central building (forming an X shape), a service and power plant building, and a nurses' residence behind the main building. The original facade of the central building was modified with a canopy entrance extension of the emergency room facilities, obscuring the first three stories of the building. All buildings in the complex are yellow brick with terra cotta trim.

Although many hospitals were constructed in the 1920s as skyscrapers, Homer G. Phillips was designed with seven stories to fit within the scale of the Ville neighborhood. A variety of roof shapes and polygonal ends on the patient wards add to the design of the building. The detailing on the building's exterior consists of a red granite base and terra cotta trim around windows and as a horizontal course around the buildings. Original secondary buildings, such as the nurses' building and lecture halls (connected to the main building via tunnel), are included as the part of hospital's designation on the National Register of Historic Places. However, a detached clinic built in 1960 is not included.

== Controversy ==
In 2015, the Associated Press reported that 18 women who gave birth at Homer G. Phillips and were told their babies had died during birth believe their children might be alive. Albert Watkins, an attorney at law representing the women, says that the births occurred from the mid-1950s to the mid-1960s, that all of the mothers were black and poor, mostly from ages 15 to 20, and that in every case a nurse told the mother that her child had died but that she could not view the child's body. Because they had been prevented from seeing their reportedly dead children, these women suspect that there may have been a baby selling ring at the hospital. These claims were dismissed by U.S. Attorney Richard Callahan when medical records revealed that one of the parents had given birth at a different hospital and had abandoned her baby.

== See also ==
- History of St. Louis, Missouri
- List of hospitals of St. Louis, Missouri
- National Register of Historic Places listings in St. Louis (city, A–L), Missouri
- Racial segregation in the United States
- Race and health
