= Douglass University =

African American university founded in 1926

Coordinates: 38.64904°N 90.24872°W

- Type: Private African American university
- Active: 1926–after 1943
- Founder: B. F. Bowles
- President: B. F. Bowles (1926–1928), Herman Dreer (1934–?)
- Location: St. Louis, Missouri, U.S.

Douglass University was a university established for African Americans in 1926 in located in St. Louis, Missouri. It was the second university in the state of Missouri to admit African American students; and it was the second U.S. law school that admitted African Americans for a full law degree. The university moved locations many times within the same city; as well as remained active off-and-on for decades after its founding.

== History ==
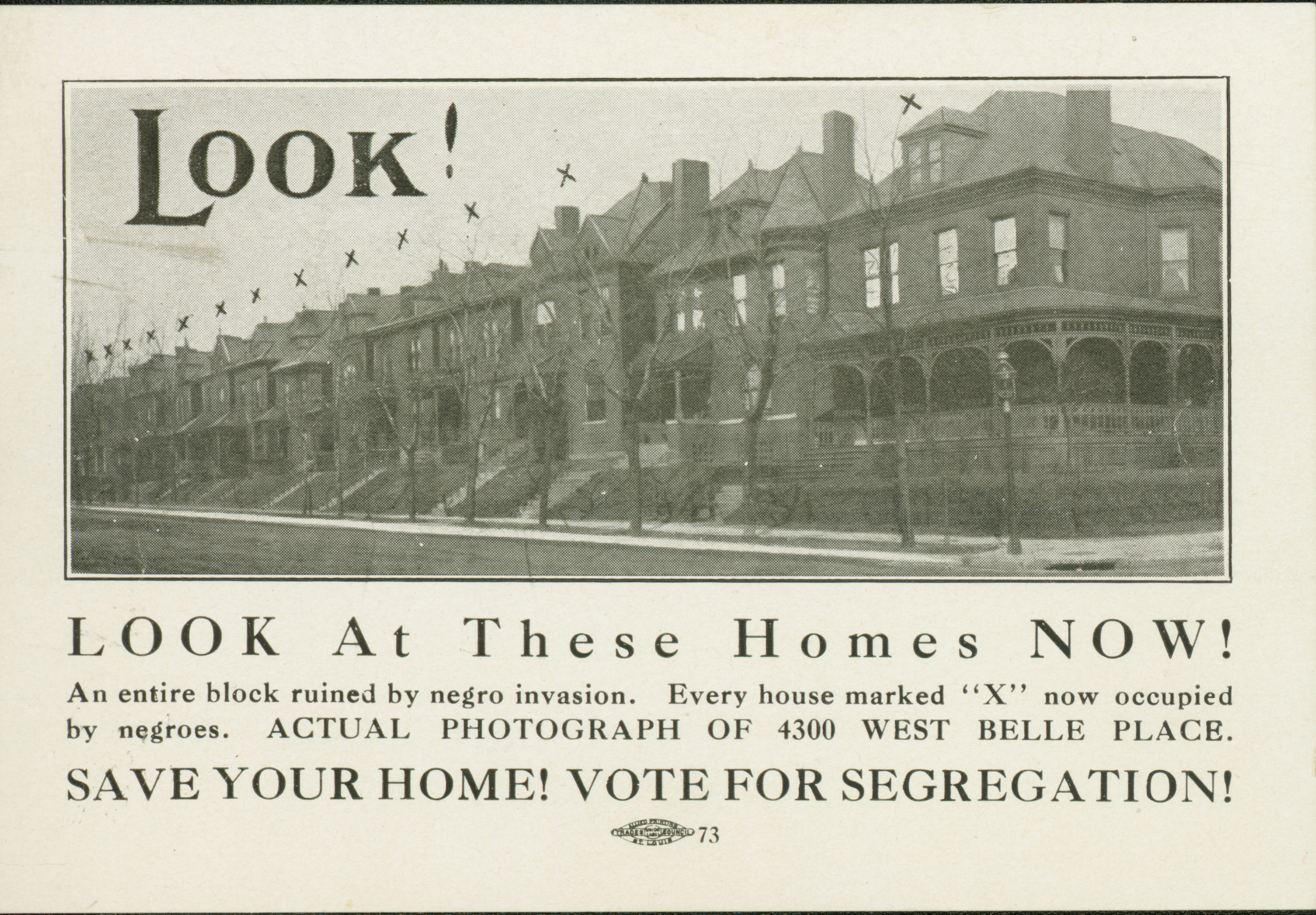
United Welfare Association postcard stating, "Look at These Homes Now! Save Your Home! Vote for Segregation!" from 1916; the same 4300 West Belle Place, St. Louis address was one of the many locations of the Douglass University campus

Douglass University was named after Frederick Douglass, and was founded by Benjamin F. Bowles for African American students in the fall of 1926. It was temporarily located at 4346 Enright Avenue but moved months later to 2803 Pine Street, St, Louis. Attorney Freeman L. Martin served as the first vice chairman and dean of the law school. The first classes were held in January 1927, and focused exclusively on law, serving only 8 students.

At the time of the university’s founding, no other college in St. Louis County admitted black students. The first university in the state of Missouri allowing black students to attend was Lincoln University (founded in 1866), which was followed by Douglass University. It was also only one of two schools in the United States offering full law degrees to black students. None of the 24 faculty received wages when the university opened. The faculty of the school was mostly made up of teachers from the local public school system. In 1928, the second year of operation, the university added departments in theology, business, and music and had increased enrollment to 37 students. The college was later moved to 4300 West Belle Place, St. Louis.

Bowles had led the school until his health declined in the late 1920s. In 1934, Herman Dreer re-opened Douglass University in a temporary location at 1042 Grand Blvd. and moved a year later to 3626 Finney Avenue, St. Louis. By 1937, the university had 54 enrolled students. It was the Great Depression and the school struggled with their financial situation. By June 1942, the school had closed. In 1943, Dreer re-opened Douglass University again.

== See also ==
- List of things named after Frederick Douglass
