= Homer G. Phillips =

American lawyer

- Painting by Vernon Smith
- Born: Homer Gilliam Phillips; April 1, 1880; Sedalia, Missouri, U.S.
- Died: June 18, 1931 (aged 51); St. Louis, Missouri, U.S.
- Occupation: Attorney
- Known for: Republican political figure; Civil rights advocate

Homer Gilliam Phillips (April 1, 1880 – June 18, 1931) was an American lawyer from Sedalia, Missouri who moved to St. Louis. An African-American Republican political figure, he was a prominent advocate for civil rights. He was a co-founder of Citizen's Liberty League, a political organization in Missouri to advance the interests of African Americans in the Republican Party. In 1928, he was the president of the St. Louis chapter of the National Bar Association. In 1931, at 51 years old, Phillips was gunned down in St. Louis in an alleged dispute over legal fees owed to him. After his death, a hospital in St. Louis he helped organize was named in his honor, Homer G. Phillips Hospital.

== Biography ==
Phillips was born in 1880, and raised in Sedalia by his aunt, after being orphaned in childhood. His father was a Methodist minister and former slave. In 1907, his 35-year-old brother John, from Smithton, Missouri, died of typhoid fever. He graduated from George R. Smith College in Sedalia, and 1903 got his law degree from Howard University. He resided in the home of Paul Laurence Dunbar, a famous Black poet, during his time at Howard. In 1912, he married Ida Perle Alexander, an actress. He also was responsible for securing $1 million for the construction of a new hospital for African Americans on the north side of St. Louis; his namesake, Homer G. Phillips Hospital. On February 22, 1937, more than 10,000 people turned out for the hospital's dedication.

== Career and advocacy ==
In 1908, he taught Civics at the Negro Teachers' Institute for Central Missouri in Sedalia. By 1911, he had moved to St. Louis and began practicing law there. In 1916, Phillips led the opposition to a segregation ordinance that was passed in St. Louis. The ordinance prevented Blacks from moving into neighborhoods where 75 percent or more of the population was White. Phillips had filed an injunction, which was denied, to prevent the special election from happening. After the ordinance passed, Phillips stated that they had been "double-crossed" by Republican leaders who did not deliver the votes needed to defeat the measure. However, the local branch of the NAACP, assisted by Phillips, filed a motion requesting a temporary injunction to suspend the ordinance from taking effect. That temporary injunction was granted on April 17, 1916, by US District Judge David Dyer, until the pending Supreme Court case Buchanan v. Warley could be decided. When the decision came down in Buchanan, the ordinance was invalidated and made illegal.

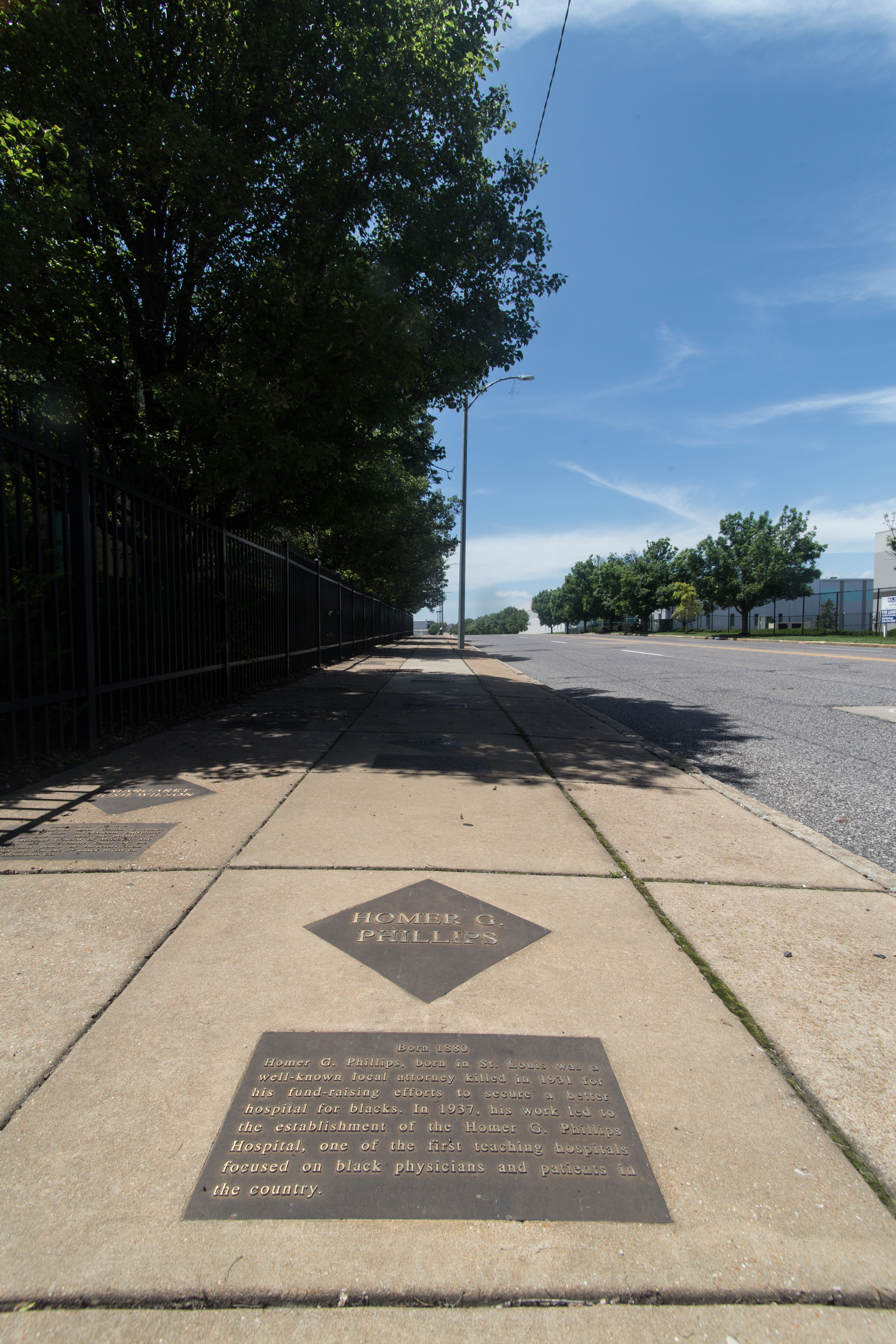
Plaque honoring Phillips in St. Louis

In 1926, he unsuccessfully ran against Leonidas C. Dyer, in the Republican primary for Congress. In 1928, he was in charge of the local National Republican Headquarters for the Western region, and was in charge of Herbert Hoover's headquarters in Kansas City during the 1928 Republican National Convention. He was a director of the Peoples Finance Corporation, and a member of the Masonic and Omega Psi Phi fraternities. Phillips also was an advocate for equal accommodations for Blacks on railroad trains, recognition of Blacks in appointments to West Point Academy, and improving the conditions for Black farmers.

== Notable cases ==
In the aftermath of the 1917 East St. Louis, Illinois riots, Phillips was retained to help defend Black soldiers who were court-martialed, and several other Black defendants who were charged with rioting. He represented Fisk University in an estate case, where Mr.McClelland had left $100,000 to the university. When the man's will could not be found to establish the donation, Phillips was successful in introducing a 'carbon copy' of the man's will and had it admitted to probate court in favor of the university. In 1925, he represented Liberty Life Insurance which was contesting paying out a $3,000 life insurance policy on a death. Phillips revealed the alleged death as a scam, when he successfully petitioned the court to have the coffin exhumed, which revealed it was filled with 200 pounds of cement. In 1927, Phillips was on record as an attorney in the divorce proceedings between Annie Turnbo Malone and her husband. Malone is considered to be one of the first Black women to become a millionaire.

== Murder ==
On June 18, 1931, Phillips left his house and was waiting to take a street car when he was approached by two young men. One of the men began speaking to him and hit him, while the other drew a gun and shot at him, striking him three times. Witnesses identified the two men as 19-year-old George McFarland and 19-year-old Augusta Brooks. They were both arrested and charged with Phillips' murder. Although the motive was unclear, the police suspected there was a dispute over the settlement of an estate worth $3000, in which McFarland's mother was an heir. McFarland went to trial in February 1932, and Brooks went to trial in August 1932.

On February 18, 1932, George McFarland was found not guilty of the murder of Phillips. McFarland claimed he had an alibi, testifying he was at a grocery store at the time of the murder. Three other witnesses corroborated his testimony. The police testified they arrested McFarland as he ran out of his house, and in his statement to them, he never mentioned going to the store the morning of the murder.

Augusta Brooks was acquitted on August 10, 1932, after the jury was out for two and a half hours. There was only one witness presented by the prosecution that placed Brooks at the scene. The state's primary witness who witnessed the actual shooting could not be found to testify. Another witness did not testify because he was reportedly at home suffering from a nervous breakdown. Because of the acquittals, the case remains unsolved.

Several thousand people attended his funeral service at Saint Paul's African Methodist Episcopal Church, his burial was in St. Peter's Cemetery. At the time of his death, his estate was valued at $4494, which was left to his wife.

== See also ==
- History of civil rights in the United States
- List of civil rights leaders
- Racial segregation in the United States
