= Helen Elizabeth Nash =

American physician (1921–2012)

- Born: August 8, 1921
- Died: October 4, 2012 (aged 91)
- Education: Spelman College; Meharry Medical College
- Employers: Homer G. Phillips Hospital; St. Louis Children's Hospital; Washington University in St. Louis
- Spouse: James B. Abernathy (m. 1964; died 1980)
- Parents: Homer Erwin Nash (father); Marie Antoinette Graves Nash (mother)

Helen Elizabeth Nash (August 8, 1921 – October 4, 2012) was a pediatrician known for breaking racial and gender barriers in the medical field. She began her career at the Homer G. Phillips Hospital, and later worked at the St. Louis Children's Hospital. She started her own private practice and was a faculty member at the Washington University School of Medicine. Her earliest work included decreasing infant mortality in Homer G. Phillips Hospital. Her private practice was notable for educating teens on proper sexual health. Additionally, she was one of the first medical doctors to address patient health as care for the patient and their support systems.

== Personal life ==
Nash was born on August 8, 1921, to Homer Erwin Nash Sr. and Marie Antoinette Graves Nash. Her father, Homer Erwin Nash Sr., returned from World War I and started a medical practice called Herndon Building in 1910. Helen was the third of six children in the family, and they were raised in Atlanta.

Homer and Marie's first child died when Homer was away at war. The baby died of dehydration from gastroenteritis, a disease later cured by Ringer's lactate solution, commonly known as Hartmann's solution, developed by Dr.Alexis Hartmann, of whom Dr.Helen Nash eventually met.

Antoine Graves, Helen's maternal grandfather, sold real estate to fund Helen's education for her medical degree. She married James B. Abernathy on August 1, 1964.

== Educational degrees ==
Nash received her bachelor's degree from Spelman College in 1941. She received her medical degree from Meharry Medical College in 1945. She made the honor roll in her first semester at Meharry Medical College and was one of only four women in her graduating class. She then began an internship at Homer G. Phillips Hospital. It was segregated at the time, and was the only hospital in St. Louis open to African-American medical doctors. She also completed her pediatric residency at Homer G. Phillips Hospital and became chief resident with the help of her mentor, Dr. Park J. White. She and White worked to improve the overall hygiene and equipment quality at the hospital, which reduced the infant mortality rate. For instance, they managed to implement more incubators and handwashing facilities.

== Career ==
In 1949, Nash opened her own medical practice in St. Louis. She was known for her generosity and openness and saw mostly poor patients. She educated teens on sex in her "Sex Room," which became a well-known feature of her practice. That same year, she became the first African American woman to join the staff at St. Louis Children's Hospital. She became president of the staff in 1977, a position she held until 1979. Also in 1949, Nash became the first African American woman to join the Washington University School of Medicine staff, where she served as a professor of clinical pediatrics. She retired as a professor in 1993, and went on to serve as the school's dean of minority affairs from 1994 to 1996.

In 1953, Nash joined the American Academy of Pediatrics, Health and Welfare Council of Metropolitan St. Louis, and the Committee of the State Welfare Department of Missouri.

Nash interned at the pediatric ward, before desegregation. She directed many changes to basic hygiene of the patients as well as broke racial divides between the black and white hospitals.

== Awards, honors, and distinctions ==
Nash accumulated many awards during her career, including a Doctor of Humane Letters from Webster University in 1992 and a Lifetime Achievement Award in Health Care by St.Louis American Foundation in 1996. In addition to healthcare, Nash often visited the Missouri Botanical Garden during her internship years and became a member of the Garden's board of trustees in 1991.

Nash was granted honorary lifetime memberships to two separate medical societies: the St. Louis Medical Society in 1975, and Medical Women's Society in 1991. In 1994, the NAACP magazine Crisis awarded Nash the Women's Medal of Honor.

== Legacy ==
Nash's legacy is carried out through the Dr. Helen E. Nash Academic Achievement Award, which The Washington University School of Medicine has given out every year since 1996. In addition, in 2014, the St. Louis Children's Hospital began offering an internship to young woman of color in Nash's honor.
