= Tandy Community Center =

Community center in St. Louis, Missouri, US

- U.S. National Register of Historic Places
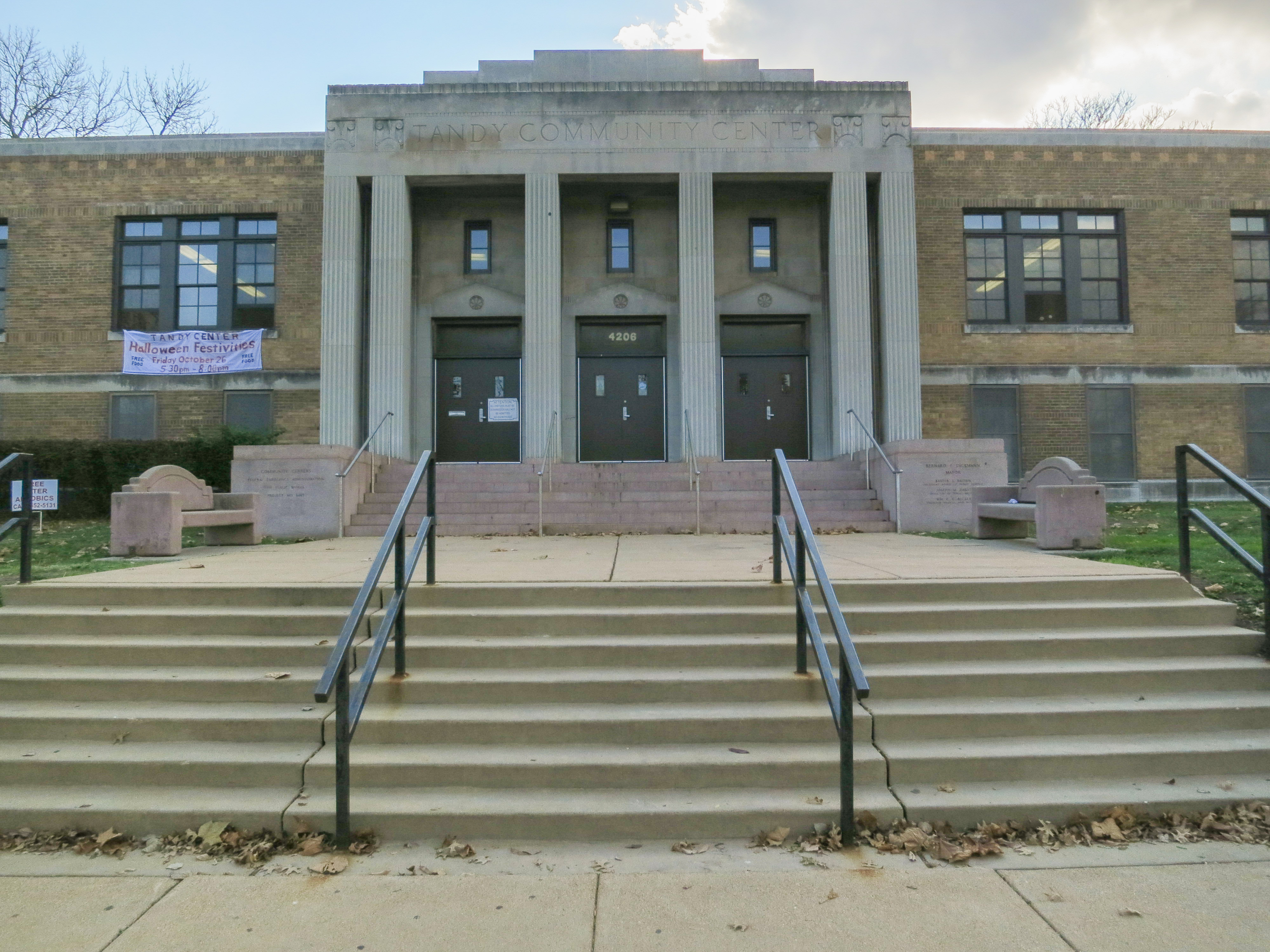
- Location: 4206 West Kennerly Avenue, St. Louis, Missouri, US
- Coordinates: 38°39′42″N 90°14′13″W
- Area: less than one acre
- Built: 1938
- Architect: Albert A. Osburg, William C. E. Becker
- Architectural style: Art Deco
- MPS: The Ville, St. Louis, Missouri MPS
- NRHP reference No.: 99001160
- Added to NRHP: September 17, 1999

The Tandy Community Center is a historic building dating from 1938, at 4206 West Kennerly Avenue in The Ville neighborhood of St. Louis, Missouri, U.S.. It is also known as the Tandy Recreation Center and PWA Project No. 8483. It has been listed on the National Register of Historic Places since 1999.

== History ==
The Tandy Community Center building was constructed in 1937 to 1938 near Tandy Park, under the funding and guidance of the Public Works Administration (PWA). The neighborhood of The Ville is a center of many important African American institutions and history.

The building was designed by architect Albert A. Osburg and engineer William C. E. Becker. Osburg served as the chief of the Public Improvement Board for the city of St. Louis, and also designed the nearby Homer G. Phillips Hospital. It is an Art Deco-style building has a T-shaped plan with a buff brick exterior, decorative limestone and terracotta details. The interior layout of the building has some Classical Revival design aspects. Most of the stem of the "T" shape is a gymnasium space for sports, with community services at the far south end.

== See also ==
- National Register of Historic Places listings in St. Louis north and west of downtown
