= The Ville, St. Louis =

Neighborhood of St. Louis, Missouri, US

Coordinates: 38.6587°N 90.2395°W

The Ville
- Neighborhood of St. Louis
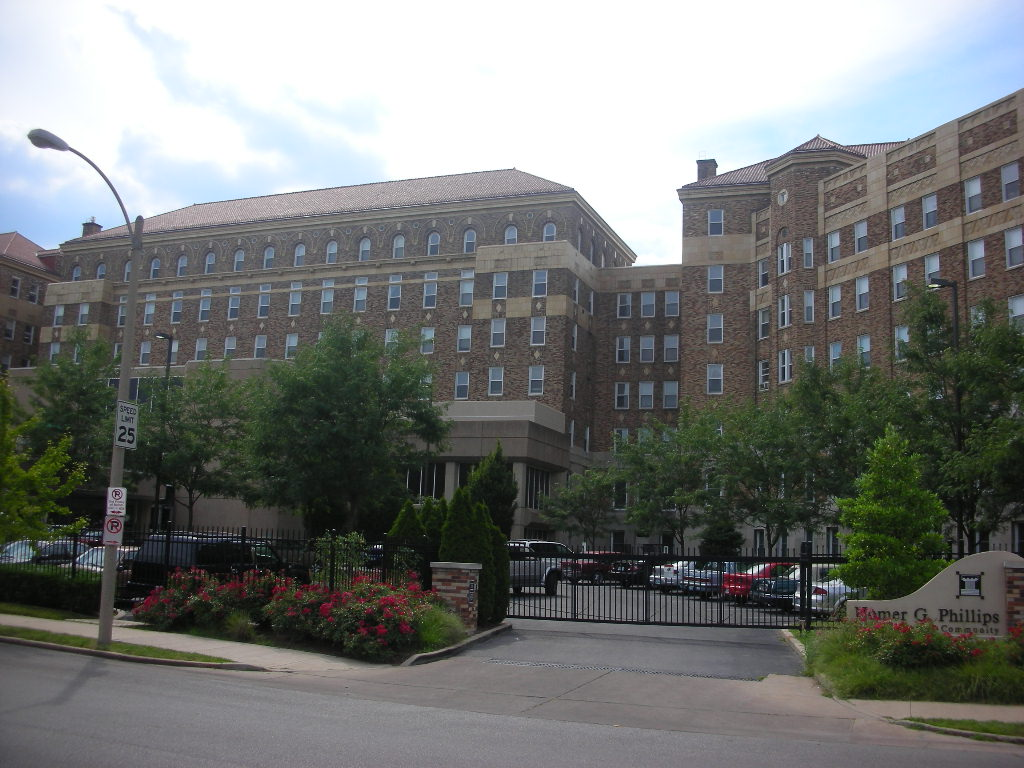
- The Homer G. Phillips Hospital was built in 1937 to provide medical care to the black residents of a segregated city.

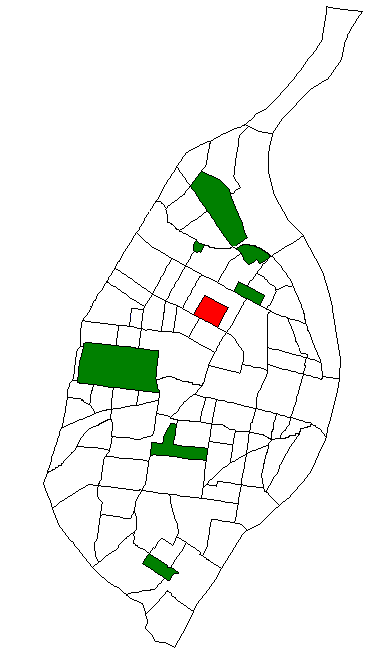
- Location (red) of the Ville within St. Louis
- Country: United States
- State: Missouri
- City: St. Louis
- Wards: 4

Government
  - Aldermen: Samuel L. Moore

Area
  - Total: 0.42 sq mi (1.1 km^{2})

Population (2020)
  - Total: 1,427
  - Density: 3,400/sq mi (1,300/km^{2})
- ZIP code(s): Part of 63113
- Area code(s): 314
- Website: stlouis-mo.gov

The Ville is a historic African-American neighborhood with many African-American businesses located in North St. Louis, Missouri, U.S.. This neighborhood is a forty-two-square-block bounded by St. Louis Avenue on the north, Martin Luther King Drive on the south, Sarah on the east and Taylor on the west. From 1911 to 1950, The Ville was the center of African American culture within the city of St. Louis.

== History ==
=== Early history ===
After St. Louis was founded in 1764, the area now known as The Ville was set aside as part of the Grand Prairie Common Fields. At this time period the area was full of farmed land, and the first Black residents arrived at this time as enslaved people by the local farmers in the area. In the early 19th century the first White settlers arrived in the area, mostly moving from the states of Virginia and Kentucky. Some of the early landowners had recognition in local street names including: Kennerly, Wash (now Whittier), Goode (now Annie Malone Drive), and Taylor. James Kennerly had a large plantation in the area, known as Cote Placquemine (or Persimmon Hill Plantation) near the present intersection of Kennerly and Taylor Avenues; and it was destroyed by fire in 1863.

=== 20th-century ===
Starting in 1911 the use of restrictive covenants and other legal restrictions prevented African Americans from finding housing in many areas of the city. As a result, the African-American population of St. Louis was concentrated in and around the Ville (a shortened form of Elleardsville the name of a rural settlement that was incorporated into St. Louis in 1876). The neighborhood was the site of a number of important cultural institutions for the Black community, including Sumner High School, the first high school for Black students west of the Mississippi River; and Homer G. Phillips Hospital, established in 1937 as one of the few Black teaching hospitals in the United States and the only one in the city to serve Black people.

The Antioch Baptist Church on Market St., whose red brick Gothic-style building was constructed in 1921 and is listed on the National Register of Historic Places, was an important cultural center of the Black community during segregation and beyond.

The history of the neighborhood was reviewed and its surviving historic resources were assessed in a 1998 study, and its extension in 2010.

== About ==
As of the 2010 Census, there are 1,868 people living in The Ville and 6,189 people in the surrounding Greater Ville neighborhood.

== Demographics ==
Historical population
| Census | Pop. | Note | %± |
|---|---|---|---|
| 1990 | 3,061 | | — |
| 2000 | 2,695 | | −12.0% |
| 2010 | 1,868 | | −30.7% |
| 2020 | 1,427 | | −23.6% |

In 2020 The Ville's racial makeup was 95.9% Black, 1.7% White, 0.3% American Indian, 1.8% Two or More Races, and 0.4% Some Other Race. 0.3% of the people were of Hispanic or Latino origin.

== Education ==
- De La Salle Middle School at St. Matthew's
- Annie Malone's Emerson Therapeutic Academy (located in De La Salle Middle)
- Harris–Stowe State University
- Sumner High School, 4248 Cottage Avenue
- Turner Middle School
- Williams Middle Community Education Center

=== Former schools ===
- Charles Turner Open Air School (or Turner Middle Branch School; built in 1924), 4235 West Kennerly Avenue
- Cote Brilliante Elementary School (closed 2018), 801 North 11th Street
- Marshall School (closed), 4342 Aldine Avenue
- Simmons Colored School (closed, formerly Colored School #8), 4215 Kennerly Avenue

== Notable buildings ==
- Antioch Baptist Church (built 1921), 4213 North Market Street; NRHP-listed
- Dr. Herman S. Dreer House (built 1930), 4335 Cote Brilliante Avenue; NRHP-listed
- Homer G. Phillips Hospital (active from 1937–1979), 2601 North Whittier Street; NRHP-listed
- Marshall School (built 1918), 4342 Aldine Avenue; NRHP-listed
- St. Louis Colored Orphans Home (built 1922; now Annie Malone Children and Family Service Center), 2612 Annie Malone Drive; NRHP-listed
- Sumner Stone High School (built 1908), 4248 West Cottage Avenue; NRHP-listed
- Tandy Community Center (built 1938), 4206 West Kennerly Ave.; NRHP-listed

== Notable people from The Ville ==
- Arthur Ashe
- Josephine Baker
- Chuck Berry
- Grace Bumbry
- John Collins-Muhammad
- Julia Davis
- Herman Dreer
- Dick Gregory
- Sonny Liston
- Annie Turnbo Malone
- Maxine Waters

== See also ==
- Peabody–Darst–Webbe, St. Louis, a neighborhood of another city hospital
