= Bobby Wilks =

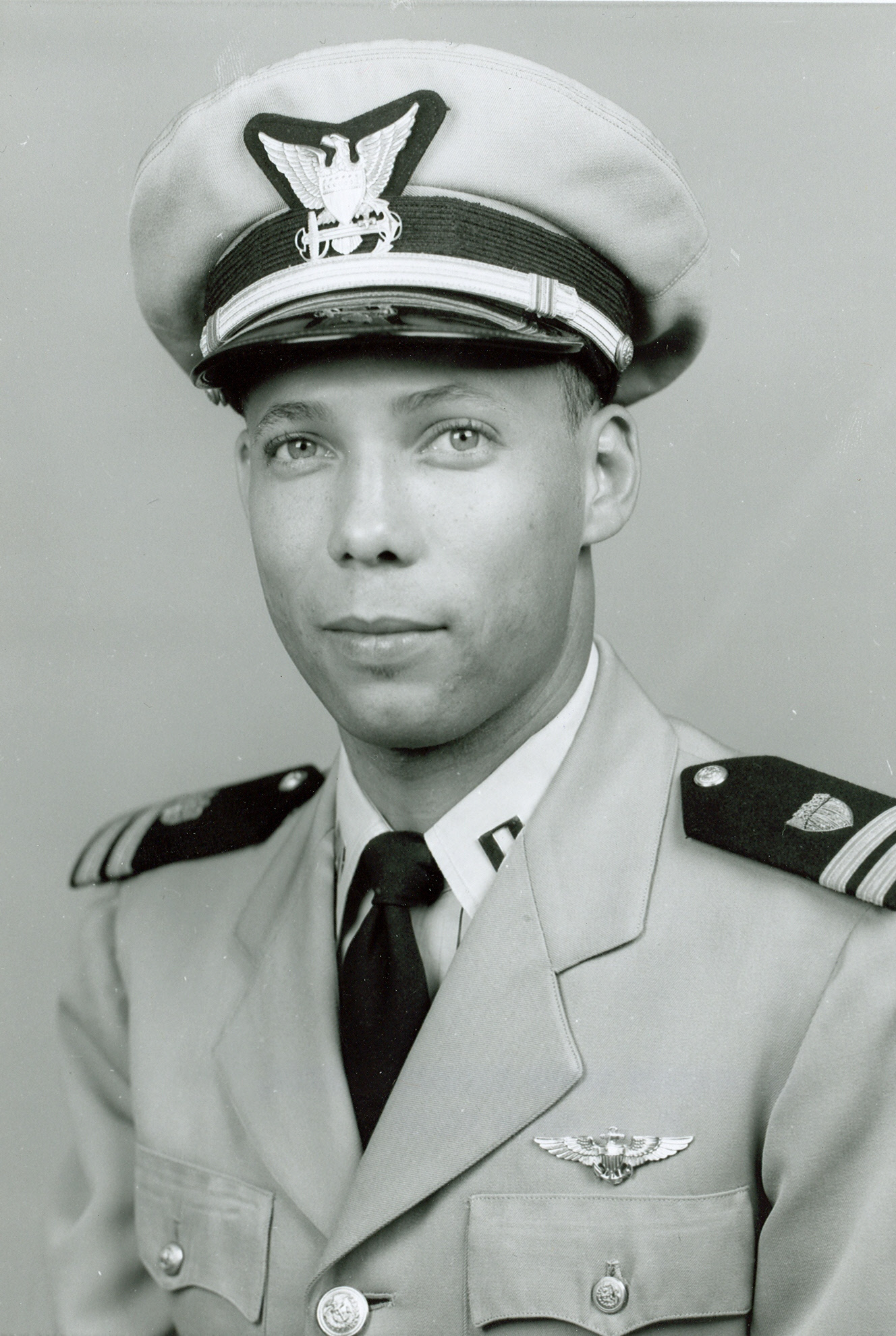
LT Bobby C. Wilks, USCG, about 1960

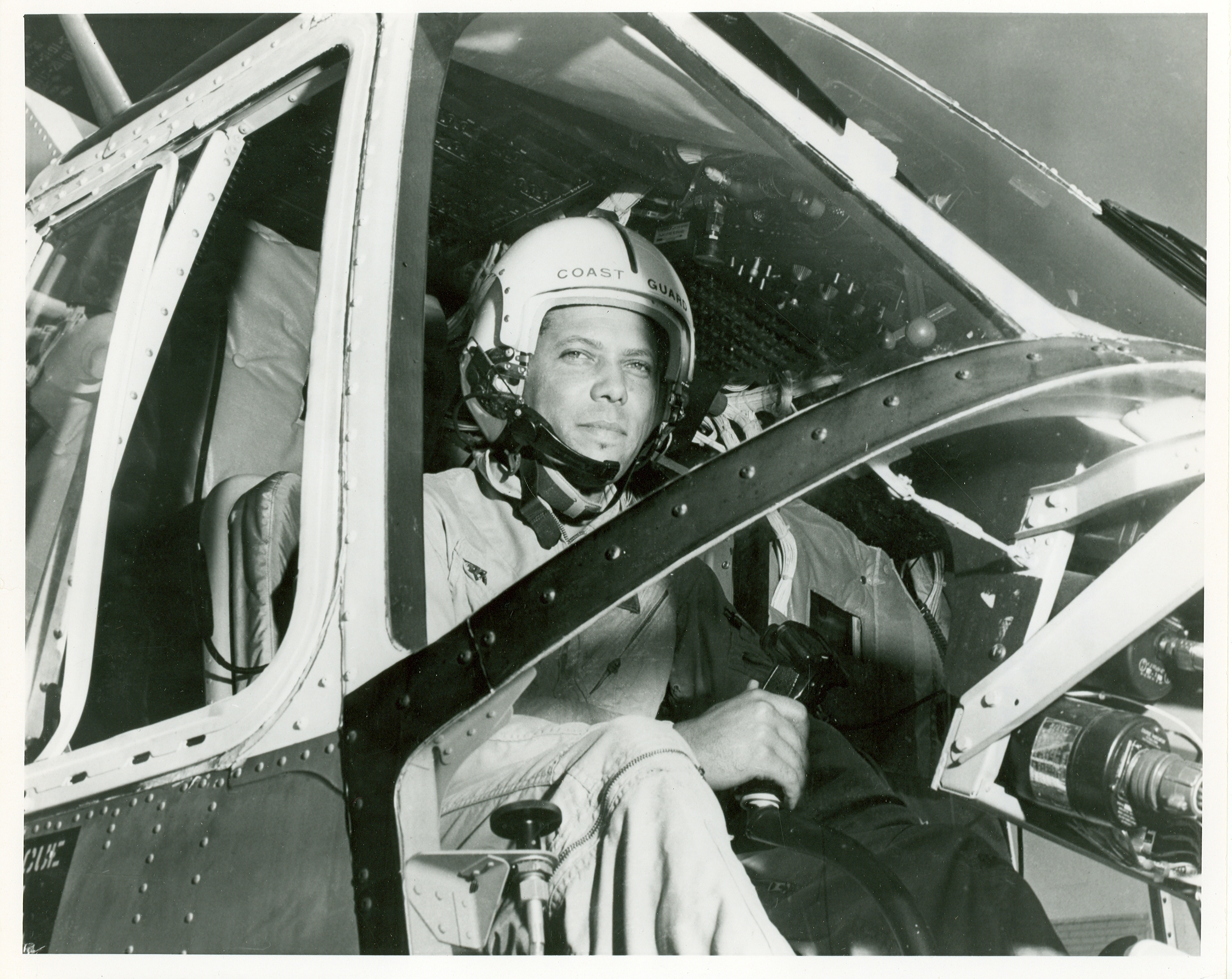
Commander Bobby Wilks at the controls of his helicopter, AIRSTA Barbers Point, Hawaii, 1971

Bobby Charles Wilks (May 12, 1931 – July 13, 2009), was an American Coast Guard aviator. He was the first African American Coast Guard aviator and the first African American to reach the rank of Coast Guard captain. Captain Wilks, who also was the first African American to command a Coast Guard air station, was involved in a number of air-sea rescues around the world. He received the Air Medal for his actions on the night of December 9, 1971, while piloting his helicopter over the Pacific Ocean.

== Early life and education ==
Wilks was born May 12, 1931, in St. Louis, Missouri. He attended Stowe Teachers College (now Harris-Stowe State University) in St. Louis for two years, and then he was accepted into the U.S. Naval Academy at Annapolis. He attended the Academy 1950–51 and then returned to Stowe, where he received his undergraduate degree. He later was awarded a master's degree in education from St. Louis University in 1954.

== Coast Guard career ==
Bobby Wilks joined the Coast Guard Reserve in 1955 and received his commission at Coast Guard Officer Candidate School in New London, Connecticut. He then attended flight school at Naval Air Station Pensacola and Naval Air Station Saufley Field in Pensacola, Florida, and received further training at Naval Air Station Corpus Christi, Texas from 1956 to 1957, earning his wings on 25 March 1957 and designated as Coast Guard Aviator Number 735. He qualified for helicopters in 1959 and became Coast Guard Helicopter Pilot Number 343. He served at Coast Guard Air Station San Francisco, the Coast Guard Air Detachment at Naval Air Station Sangley Point in the Philippines, Coast Guard Air Station Barbers Point collocated with Naval Air Station Barbers Point, Hawaii, Coast Guard Air Station Brooklyn in New York City, as well as numerous other duty stations. He augmented to the Regular Coast Guard in 1960 with the permanent rank of lieutenant.

Captain Wilks saw distinguished service at several Coast Guard Air Stations during his career, including oversea tours of duty at Coast Guard Air Detachment Sangley Point, Philippines and at Naples, Italy, participating in many search-and-rescue (SAR) cases, including one in which he earned the Air Medal. He was promoted to the rank of captain in 1977 and two years later assumed the command of Coast Guard Air Station Brooklyn.

Captain Wilks retired from the Coast Guard in 1986 with over 6,000 flight hours in 21 different types of aircraft. During his career he established a number of "firsts", including:

- First African American aviator in the Coast Guard
- First African American Coast Guardsman to achieve the rank of Captain
- First African American Coast Guardsman to command an Air Station

Another of his important contributions to the Coast Guard was his service as a mentor for younger African-American Coast Guardsmen, many of whom have noted the positive impact Captain Wilks had on their careers.

== Death ==
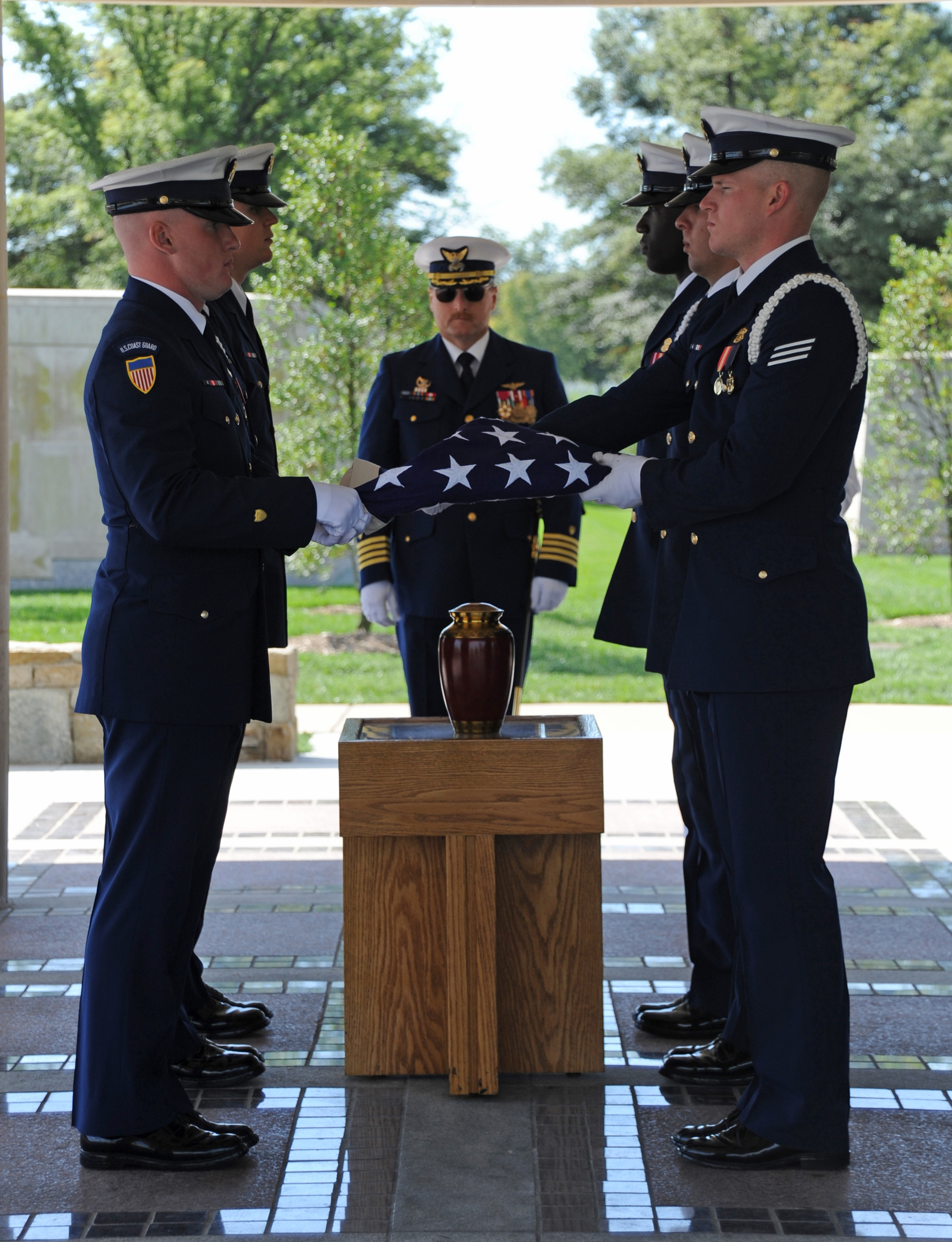
Funeral of Bobby Wilks at Arlington National Cemetery (September 29, 2009)

Captain Wilks died on July 13, 2009, at Emeritus at Lake Ridge, in Woodbridge, Virginia. He was inurned at Arlington National Cemetery on September 29, 2009.
