= Antioch Baptist Church (St. Louis, Missouri) =

Historic church in Missouri, United States

- U.S. National Register of Historic Places
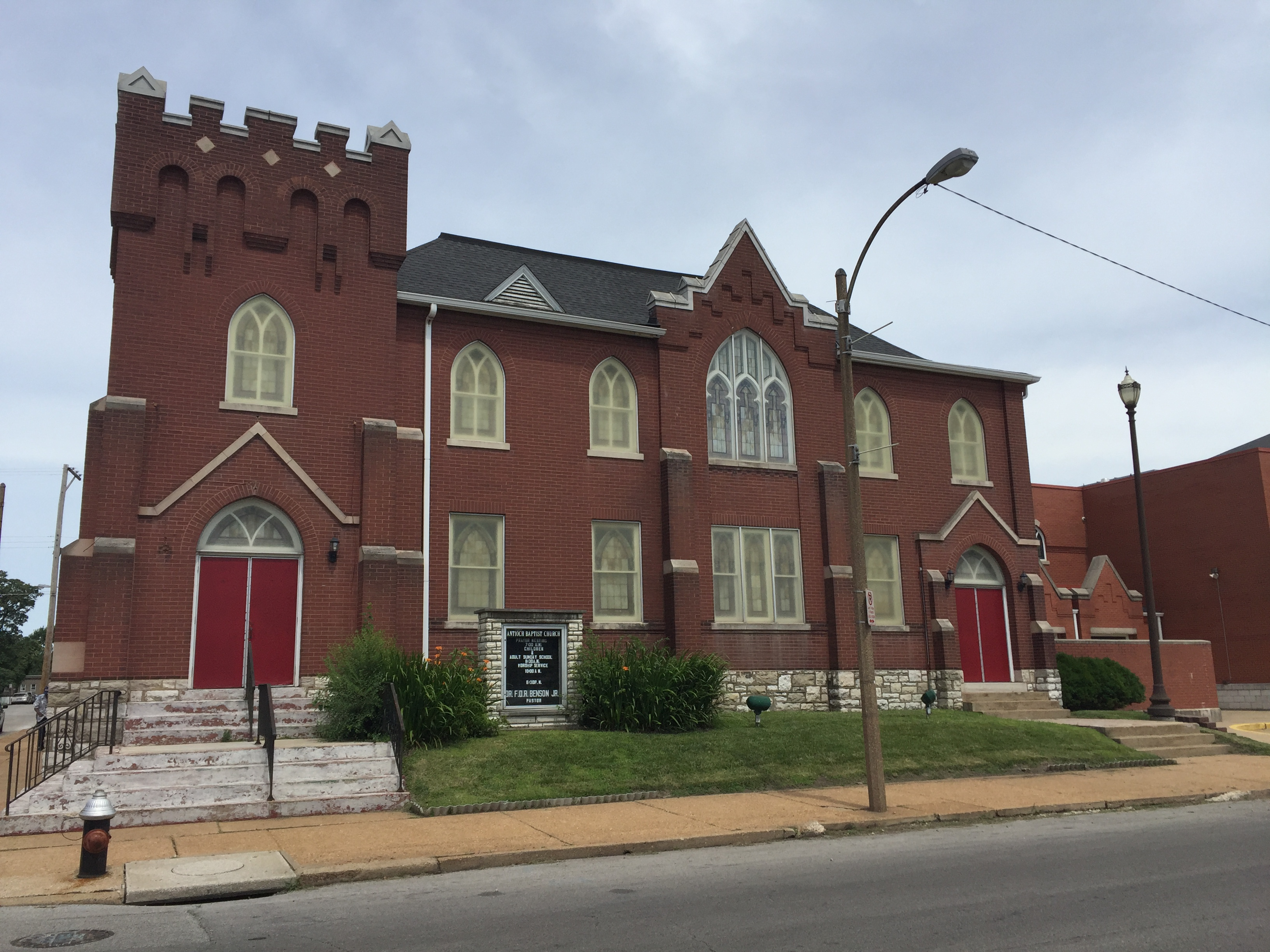

- Location within St. Louis Location within Missouri Location within the United States
- Location: 4213 N. Market St., St. Louis, Missouri
- Coordinates: 38.658093°N 90.238356°W
- Built: 1921
- Built by: T.J. Ward Construction Co.
- Architect: Robinson, W.B.
- Architectural style: Late Gothic Revival
- MPS: The Ville, St. Louis, Missouri MPS
- NRHP reference No.: 99001166
- Added to NRHP: September 17, 1999

The Antioch Baptist Church in St. Louis, Missouri is a church long important in the Black community of the Ville neighborhood of North St. Louis. It is located in a Gothic Revival-style brick building at 4213 N. Market St. which was built in 1921. The building was added to the National Register of Historic Places in 1999.

The church was established in 1878 by 12 members of the Black community at a home on what was then named Wash Street in what was then Elleardsville, a suburb recently incorporated into the city. The congregation grew, and eventually acquired a site on Kennerly, built a frame church, and was incorporated in 1884.

According to the 1999 National Register nomination:

The Black population of the Ville grew dramatically from World War I onwards as the application of race-restrictive covenants prevented Blacks from living in many other areas of north St. Louis. After purchasing the predominantly white Goode Avenue Methodist Episcopal Church in 1909 for $6,000 (located on the present site of Antioch's Educational Building), the church continued to expand. When fund raising for a new sanctuary began in 1915, the congregation had nearly 500 members. By the October 1920 cornerstone laying ceremony, the congregation had swelled to over 700 members.

The church was designed by W. B. Robinson and was built by T.J. Ward Construction Co., with final cost including the purchase price of the property and a $3,000 organ being $74,000. It is a red brick nearly square plan church "distinguished by buttresses at the corners and defining the doors and bays. Visual interest is added by slightly projecting bays at the center of both east and south elevations; their steep-pitched stepped gables, corbeled in a less pronounced imitation of the corner tower, pierce the roofline. Below, each has a large, tripartite, traceried Gothic-arched window above a tripartite flat-arched window. The square, crenelated comer tower is topped with a corbeled blind arcade with white stone diamond-shaped insets above. The primary entrance to the sanctuary is located in the east side of this tower, reached via a flight of steps."

Connected to the west is a flat-roofed education building designed to be compatible. This was built in 1954-1955.

The history given in the 1999 nomination, continues:

In 1948 the landmark Supreme Court decision in Shelley v. Kramer declared race-restrictive covenants illegal, and middle-class Blacks began to move into areas of north St. Louis outside of the Ville. In the 1960s a number of those same middle-class families would follow the general exodus out of the city as large numbers of poor Blacks displaced by urban renewal in the central east-west corridor moved into northside neighbortioods. As property values fell and overall population in the Ville declined, Antioch decided nonetheless less to remain in its historic location. The decision to stay has not hurt Antioch, however; current membership exceeds 2000 and the church is financially healthy. Antioch's three-story crenelated corner tower has become a symbol of stability in an area with a relatively high demolition rate. Most church members live outside the Ville; some according to a church deacon, live as far away as Illinois and St. Charles County, Missouri. Many are long-time members who maintained ties to the church after leaving the Ville.

The church was in good condition in 1999. It was deemed culturally significant for National Register listing for its association with the Black community during segregation and beyond.

The listing was compatible with a 1998 study of historic resources in the Ville, and the study's extension in 2010.
