= Benjamin F. Bowles =

Educator

Benjamin Franklin Bowles (1869–1928), commonly written as B. F. Bowles, was an African American civil rights leader, teacher, high school principal, and the founder and president of Douglass University, a 20th-century college for African Americans in segregated St. Louis, Missouri.

== Biography ==
Benjamin Franklin Bowles was born on a farm near Cooperville in Pike County, Ohio. His parents were Delia (née Nash) and John H. Bowles. Bowles attended Wilberforce University, and received a A. M. degree in 1905. He had been married twice, first to Annie R. Anderson, followed by Caroline "Carrie" King Johnson. In total he had five children.

Early in his career he taught grammar school in Du Quoin and Metropolis, Illinois. He served as principal of Lincoln High School in East St. Louis from 1896 to 1914. He also worked as faculty at Lincoln University, a public historically black land-grant university in Jefferson City, Missouri.

In 1921, Bowles signed an NAACP petition as a representative in Missouri, in support of the Dyer Anti-Lynching Bill.

Bowles founded Douglass University in St. Louis in 1926, which he operated until the late 1920s due to a decline in his health. The school remained active off-and-on for decades after. At the time of the university's founding, no other college in St. Louis County admitted black students. The first university in the state of Missouri allowing black students to attend was Lincoln University (founded in 1866), which was followed by Douglass University. It was also only one of two schools in the United States offering full law degrees to black students.

== Death and legacy ==
Bowles died in September 1928. W. E. B. DuBois wrote to Benjamin F. Bowles' wife Carrie after Bowles death requesting an obituary writeup for The Crisis.
