= Harris–Stowe State University =

Historically black public university in St. Louis, Missouri, US

- Former names: Harris Teachers College (1857–1954); Sumner Normal School (1890–1929); Stowe Teachers College (1929–1954); Harris–Stowe State College (1954–2005)
- Motto: Inspiring change.
- Type: Public historically black university
- Established: 1857; 169 years ago
- President: LaTonia Collins Smith
- Provost: Edward Hill
- Students: 1,098 (Fall 2023)
- Location: St. Louis, Missouri, United States
- Campus: Urban
- Colors: Brown & Gold
- Nickname: Hornets
- Sporting affiliations: NAIA – American Midwest
- Website: www.hssu.edu
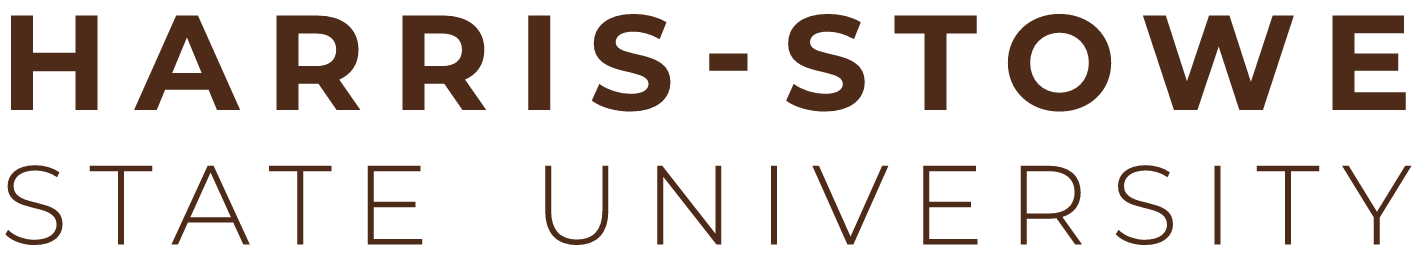
- Harris–Stowe State University
- U.S. National Register of Historic Places
- Location within St. Louis Location within Missouri Location within the United States
- Location: 3026 Laclede Avenue, St. Louis, MO 63103
- Coordinates: 38°38′00″N 90°13′27″W
- Area: 1.9 acres (0.77 ha)
- Built: 1905
- Architectural style: Tudor Revival
- NRHP reference No.: 04000787
- Added to NRHP: August 4, 2004

Harris–Stowe State University (HSSU) is a public historically black university in St. Louis, Missouri. The university offers 50 majors, minors, and certificate programs in education, business, and arts & sciences. It is a member-school of the Thurgood Marshall College Fund. It is located immediately east of the Saint Louis University campus. The school had a fall headcount enrollment of 1,098 students in 2023.

== History ==
HSSU has roots in more than one institution; one with a White student body, one with a Black student body, one pre-emancipation and the other post-emancipation. Origins of HSSU, pre-emancipation, began 1857 when the St. Louis Public Schools founded St. Louis Normal School, a Whites-only school, and post-emancipation in 1890 as the Sumner Normal School, solely for the preparation of African American women, as elementary school teachers. These institutions had these things in common, they were racially segregated, they were women-only, and all their graduates were school teachers.

Although two separate institutions, prior to 1954, for a period of time, John L. Purdom, was president of both institutions during the 1930s. St. Louis Normal School (Harris Teachers College) and Sumner Normal School (Stowe Teachers College) started to admit men in 1940. They merged into a single institution after 1954.

=== St. Louis Normal School ===
In 1857, pre-emancipation, St. Louis Public Schools established a normal school. The St. Louis Normal School was established solely for the preparation of White women as elementary school teachers. This campus was Whites-only. The student body was limited to women-only.

Post-emancipation, it was named Harris Teachers College, after William Torrey Harris. The former St. Louis superintendent of schools, he had also served as the United States Commissioner of Education, during the late 19th to early 20th century, 1889-1906.

Pre-emancipation, 1863, Anna Brackett became principal of the school. It was the first normal school led by a woman in the United States. During her tenure, Brackett worked to ensure female students had access to higher education and liberal studies as preparation for professional teaching. She made two proposals to the Board of Education that were eventually adopted. Her proposal was an age requirement for entrance to the school. Another proposal, there should be an entrance exam for admission. In 1872, Brackett resigned as principal. There were changes in the curriculum that went against her beliefs.

In 1920, Harris Teachers College became a four-year undergraduate institution authorized to grant a Bachelor of Arts in Education Degree.

=== Sumner Normal School ===
In 1890, St. Louis Public Schools established the Sumner Normal School to train Black teachers in St. Louis. In 1924, Sumner Normal School was authorized to issue a four-year Bachelor of Arts in Education degree.

In 1929, its name was changed to Stowe Teachers College, inspired by Harriet Beecher Stowe, whose novel, Uncle Tom's Cabin, had promoted the abolitionist cause in the antebellum United States. From 1930 until 1940, Stowe Teachers College was situated in the former Simmons Colored School campus.

=== Merging two St. Louis colleges ===
The U.S. Supreme Court's 1954 decision in Brown v. Board of Education mandated integration of public school systems. In response to this, Harris and Stowe Colleges were merged into one institution, which retained the "Harris Teachers College" name. At the behest of Stowe alumni and other St. Louisans, the name "Stowe" was added, and the school became Harris-Stowe College.

=== Branching out into higher education and state college status ===
In 1979, the college was added to the state system of public higher education, under the name of Harris-Stowe State College. Another four-year education degree was added to offer a Bachelor of Science in Education. By 1981, more programs were added to offer several new degrees in education, including the B.S. in Urban Education, designed to enable non-teaching urban education personnel to address problems specific to urban schools; and a degree in Business Administration.

=== University status ===
In 2005, the college attained university status. Renamed Harris–Stowe State University. The school enrolled 1,098 students in 2023.

=== Geographical Historic Registry status ===
The Stowe Teachers College building was listed on the National Register of Historic Places in 2004. Resulting from the 1998 study, and its 2010 extension, of historic resources in the Ville neighborhood of St. Louis, Missouri.

== Academics and accreditation ==
=== Academics ===
The Department of Academic Affairs have three academic units:

- Anheuser-Busch School of Business
- College of Arts & Sciences
- College of Education

Degree programs at Harris-Stowe require general education studies.

=== William L. Clay, Sr. Early Childhood Development/Parenting Education Center ===
The William L. Clay, Sr. Early Childhood Development/Parenting Education Center is an early childhood child care center located on campus. Harris-Stowe invested $11 million into the new facility to train early learning professionals, provide parenting education, and offer high quality day care for children. Harris-Stowe was awarded an FY09 Area Resources for Community and Human Services (ARCHS) start-up and expansion grant to assist in the purchase of developmentally appropriate materials for the center's new infant/toddler rooms.

=== Accreditation ===
Harris–Stowe State University is accredited by the Higher Learning Commission. The Anheuser-Busch School of Business is also accredited by the Association of Collegiate Business Schools and Programs and the International Assembly for Collegiate Business Education. The School of Education is also accredited by the Council for the Accreditation of Educator Preparation.

=== Ranking ===
Harris-Stowe State University was ranked #55-#70 in Regional Colleges Midwest in 2020 by U S News & World Report.

== Student life ==
Undergraduate demographics as of Fall 2023
Race and ethnicity	Total
Black	83%
International student	5%
Two or more races	4%
Unknown	4%
White	3%
Hispanic	2%
Economic diversity
Low-income (Note: The percentage of students who received an income-based federal Pell grant intended for low-income students.)	73%
Affluent (Note: The percentage of students who are a part of the American middle class at the bare minimum.)	27%

=== Student organizations ===
The Office of Student Engagement sponsors or hosts more than thirty activities or special interest clubs and approximately a dozen academic clubs and honor societies, several campus affiliate chapters of national organizations, and nearly 12 Greek organizations (mostly in conjunction with other St. Louis area colleges and universities).

==== Academic organizations ====
- Sigma Alpha Pi National Honor Society
- Alpha Chi Honor Society
- Accounting Students Association
- Kappa Delta Pi
- Kappa Mu Epsilon (Math Honor Society)
- Delta Mu Delta

== Athletics ==
The Harris–Stowe State athletic teams are called the Hornets. The university is a member of the National Association of Intercollegiate Athletics (NAIA), primarily competing in the American Midwest Conference (AMC) since the 1986–87 academic year. Their mascot is the Hornet.

Harris–Stowe State competes in 12 intercollegiate varsity sports: Men's sports include baseball, basketball, soccer and track & field (indoor and outdoor); while women's sports include basketball, soccer, softball, track & field (indoor and outdoor) and volleyball; and co-ed sports include cheerleading.

=== Men's basketball ===
The Harris–Stowe State men's basketball team won the American Midwest Conference tournament championship in 2017 and 2018.

== Notable alumni ==
- Arlene Ackerman, former superintendent of public schools in District of Columbia, San Francisco and Philadelphia
- John Burton (1910–1992), first African-American mayor in Michigan
- Cori Bush, Representative for Missouri's 1st congressional district
- David S. Cunningham, Jr., Los Angeles, California, City Council member, 1973–87
- Kimberly Gardner, politician and former circuit attorney for St. Louis, Missouri
- Julius Hunter, retired television anchorman, former St. Louis University vice-president, author
- Bobby Wilks, U.S. Coast Guard aviator, first African-American promoted to Captain in the Coast Guard
- DJ Tab, hip hop DJ, record producer, and entrepreneur
- J. B. "Jet" Banks (1924–2003) American Democratic politician who served in the Missouri Senate
