= Peabody–Darst–Webbe, St. Louis =

Neighborhood of St. Louis in Missouri, US

Coordinates: 38.6161°N 90.2069°W

Peabody–Darst–Webbe
- Neighborhood of St. Louis
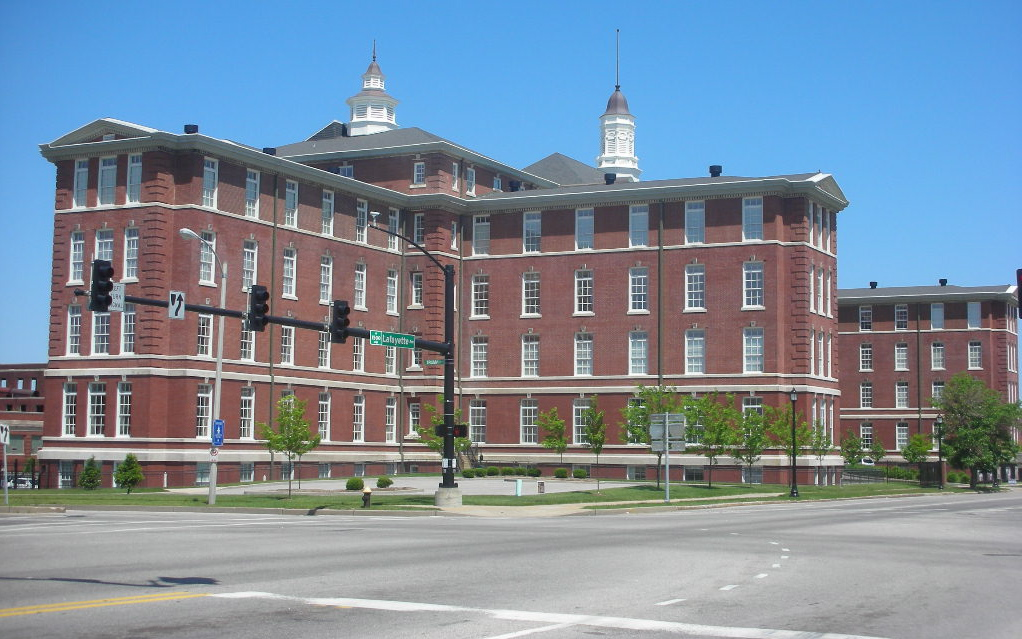
- The renovated City Hospital, located in the southern end of Peabody/Darst/Webbe, is now an upscale condominium complex.

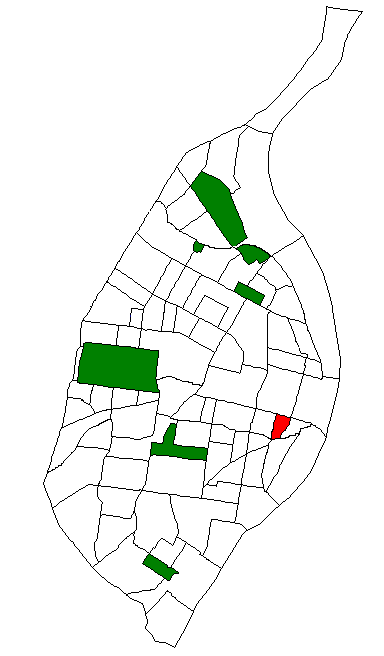
- Location (red) of Peabody/Darst/Webbe within St. Louis
- Country: United States
- State: Missouri
- City: St. Louis
- Wards: 8

Government
  - Aldermen: Jami Cox Antwi

Area
  - Total: 0.20 sq mi (0.52 km^{2})

Population (2020)
  - Total: 2,443
  - Density: 12,000/sq mi (4,700/km^{2})
- ZIP code(s): Part of 63104
- Area code(s): 314
- Website: stlouis-mo.gov

Peabody–Darst–Webbe is a neighborhood of St. Louis, Missouri. It is also called the Near Southside neighborhood. Peabody–Darst–Webbe is an area bounded by S. Tucker Blvd. on the east, Chouteau Ave. on the north, Dolman Street on the west, and the I-55/I-44 interchange on the south.

== Demographics ==
Historical population
| Year | Pop. | ±% |
|---|---|---|
| 1990 | 1,698 | — |
| 2000 | 1,460 | −14.0% |
| 2010 | 2,378 | +62.9% |
| 2020 | 2,443 | +2.7% |

In 2020 Peabody Darst Webbe's racial makeup was 79.7% Black, 15.3% White, 0.1% Native American, 0.8% Asian, 3.6% Two or More Races, and 0.6% Some Other Race. 1.6% of the population were of Hispanic or Latino origin.

| Racial composition | 2000 | 2010 | 2020 |
|---|---|---|---|
| White | 3.0% | 10.3% | 15.3% |
| Black or African American | 95.6% | 87.5% | 79.7% |
| Hispanic or Latino (of any race) | 1.3% | 0.5% | 1.6% |
| Asian | 0% | 0.3% | 0.8% |

== See also ==
- The Ville, St. Louis another neighborhood that used to have a city hospital
