= Praiz' =

American singer and songwriter

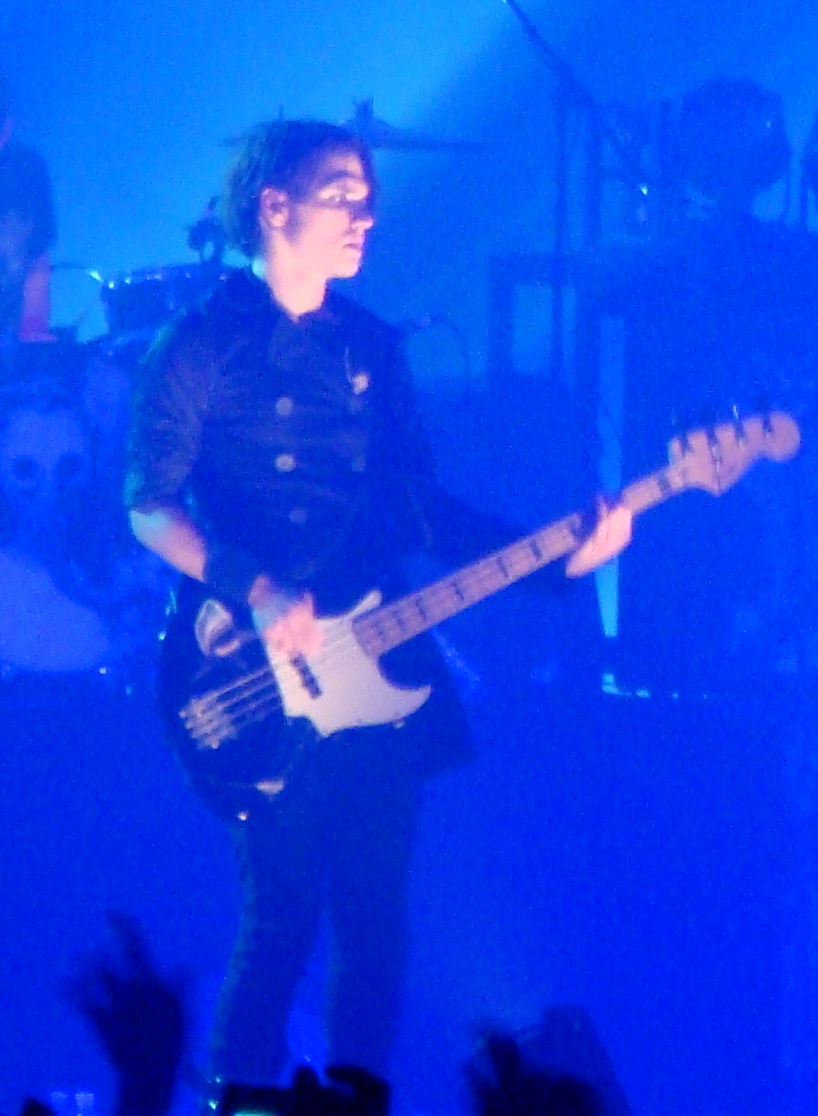
- Praiz' in 2005

Background information
- Also known as: V'land, V'leezy, Bro. Vance
- Born: Vance Lee Watt II; August 16, 1976 (age 50); Gary, Indiana, U.S.
- Origin: St. Louis, Missouri
- Genres: R&B, Pop, Gospel, Christian Rap, CCM
- Occupations: Singer, songwriter, music producer, recording engineer, mixing engineer
- Instruments: Vocals, piano, drums, guitar, bass, talkbox
- Years active: 1995–present
- Labels: 5464 Music, Parking Lot Praiz' Beats, Lighthouse Records, Jericho Records, 5464 Entertainment, W.B.M.S

Vance Lee Watt II (born August 16, 1976), known professionally as Praiz', is an American entertainer, singer-songwriter, record producer, and worship leader. He has performed with artists including Brian McKnight, New Edition, Gerald Levert, Dru Hill, Outkast, 112, Ray J, and Nick Cannon, among others. Praiz' has been called the "Nelly of Gospel".

== Early life ==
Watt was born in Gary, Indiana and is the youngest of four siblings. After the death of his father, he moved to St. Louis. He began writing songs at the age of 13 and had taught himself to play the piano by the time he was 16.

== Career ==
=== 1995–1999: Career beginnings ===
Praiz' began his career as a producer, performer, and writer in St. Louis, Missouri. He honed his production and performance skills while touring with his uncle, Sonny Metcalfe, a promoter and manager. He performed with several R&B groups before becoming a solo act. In 1999, Praiz' released his first self-produced R&B solo album, Wave Yo Hands.

=== 1999–2003: Jericho Records ===
Wave Yo Hands was the only R&B album Praiz' officially released. After a serious car accident, he focused on producing and writing for several hip-hop, R&B, gospel, and Christian rap artists, including Chingy and Thi'sl. During this time, Praiz' formed Jericho Records with his business partner and mentor, Darren Mack Sr. With Praiz' as the sole producer and writer, they produced for a series of Contemporary Gospel artists, including Young Saint, Holy Child, Psalms, and 2 Life 2 Christ compilations. They received several awards for production work, including Praise God Productions' Record Company of the Year Award in 2000. During this period, Praiz' released two self-produced independent contemporary gospel albums: The Race and Preacher's Ball.

=== 2004–2011: Parking Lot Praiz' Beats ===
In 2004, Praiz' parted ways with his previous recording partners and established his own production company, Parking Lot Praiz' Beats. The following year, he released The Take Over as an independent artist. The album featured singles such as "Deliver Me," "Selah Selah," "Praiz'," and "More Than Conquerors."

Following its release, "Deliver Me" received significant airplay on major R&B and gospel radio stations, including Clear Channel and became the most requested track for several consecutive weeks. The St. Louis American featured a front-page review by editor Chris King, who described the artist as "STL's new prince of Praiz" and remarked, "The devil must be mad as hell."

== Awards ==
In 2006, Praiz' won 'Best Contemporary Gospel Artist' from the Saint Louis Music Awards, sponsored by KDHX FM 88.1 and Playback STL magazine.

Praiz' was titled 'Best Gospel Artist' in Riverfront Times's Best of St. Louis 2006.

Praiz' is included in St. Louis Magazine's 2012 list 'The Best St. Louis Gospel Musicians of All Time.'

== Personal life ==
Praiz' is a worship pastor and a musician leading weekly worship in the community. He married in 2003 and has four children.

== Discography ==
=== Albums ===
- Wave Yo Hands (1998)
- The Race (1999)
- Preacher's Ball (2002)
- The Take Over (2005)
- Pride (2008)
- Anthem Lineage (2014)
- The Perfect Peace Project (2016)

=== Singles ===
- "Let Go" (2010)
- "Stomp On the Devil" (2011)
- "We Are Family" (2015)
- "Celebrate Joy Is Here" (2016)

== See also ==
- List of American musicians
