= Katharine DuPre Lumpkin =

American writer (1897–1988)

- Born: December 22, 1897; Macon, Georgia, U.S.
- Died: May 5, 1988 (aged 90); Chapel Hill, North Carolina, U.S.
- Education: Brenau College, Columbia University, University of Wisconsin
- Notable work: The Making of a Southerner (1947)

Katharine DuPre Lumpkin (December 22, 1897 – May 5, 1988) was an American writer and sociologist from Macon, Georgia. She is a member of both the Georgia Writers Hall of Fame and the Georgia Women of Achievement.

== Background ==
Katharine DuPre Lumpkin was born on December 22, 1897, in Macon, Georgia, to Annette Caroline Morris and William Wallace Lumpkin. Her father was a veteran of the Civil War. There were seven siblings, who by birth order were: Elizabeth (teacher), Hope (clergyman), Alva (politician), Morris (lawyer), Grace (writer), and Katharine (academic). Between 1912 and 1915 she attended Brenau University in Gainesville, Georgia. At Brenau she joined the Young Women's Christian Association serving as president before she graduated. In her autobiography, Lumpkin describes her shock upon learning that her all-white chapter of the Young Women's Christian Association (YWCA) would be addressed by a black woman named Miss Jane Arthur. She later said that "the heavens had not fallen, nor the earth parted asunder to swallow us up in this unheard of transgression". She compared it to the biblical story from the Book of Samuel about the man who had defied the law by touching the sacred Tabernacle of Jehovah. In realizing that nothing fundamentally distinguished Miss Arthur from a white woman, she said that she had touched the "tabernacle of our sacred racial beliefs" and "not the slightest thing had happened".

In 1918 she moved to New York to continue her education, graduating from Columbia University with an MA in sociology in 1919. Returning to the South, she worked as the YWCA's national student secretary for the South, working with other YWCA women including Frances Harriet Williams, Juanita Jane Saddler, and Juliette Derricotte to establish a program on interracial student groups to discuss racism and prejudices. Lumpkin left the YWCA in 1925 to pursue her PhD in sociology at the University of Wisconsin in Madison, graduating in 1928.

== Career ==
After receiving her PhD, Lumpkin accepted a one-year position at Mount Holyoke College in South Hadley, Massachusetts. At the end of her term at Mount Holyoke she accepted a one-year postdoctoral fellow at the Social Sciences Research Council in New York City.

While at Mount Holyoke, Katharine met economist Dorothy Wolff Douglas (wife of economist Paul Douglas), and the pair began a romantic relationship. They lived in Northampton, Massachusetts, where Dorothy taught economics at Smith College, after Douglas divorced her first husband, US Senator Paul Douglas. The pair lived at 54 Prospect Street (The Manse) with Douglas' four children, while Lumpkin worked at Smith College's Council of Industrial Studies (1932–1939), then at the Institute of Labor Studies (1940–1953). They worked together on several books including Child Workers in America (1937).

Leaving Northampton by 1950, Lumpkin spent a year as a lecturer at Mills College in Oakland, California, before moving to Wells College in Aurora, New York in 1957 to teach as a professor of sociology. There, she taught a course "The Negro Minority in American Life," focusing on then contemporary issues of the civil rights movement. She taught there for nearly a decade before retiring to Charlottesville, Virginia, working as an extension lecturer for the University of Virginia until she moved to Chapel Hill, North Carolina in 1979.

== Making of a Southerner (1947) ==
In her most notable work, The Making of a Southerner (1947), Lumpkin autobiographically explored her upbringing in a former slaveholding family that supported the Lost Cause narrative of the Civil War. Her father William was raised on a plantation where his father owned approximately 1000 acres of land and 50 slaves in Oglethorpe County, Georgia. On southern slaveholders and how her father was raised she has written that:

"Above all, he would know his slaves, each by name and each for his good points and foibles, most of them being inherited, or the children of those who had been handed down. He would expect constantly to guide and discipline and keep them contented by skillful handling. First and last, he would know that every plan, every decision, every quandary nagging his mind, save those of marketing his cotton and purchasing supplies from the outside, resolved itself into a human problem, if it could be so called: the problem of managing his black dependents. He would know he was master in all things on his plantation, everything, nothing excepted, including the life of his slaves. With it he would know that his station was secure as a southern gentleman."

The rest of the biography focuses on Lumpkin's own upbringing in the South and her life experiences as a Southerner in the North and Midwest.

== Death and legacy ==
Lumpkin died age 90 in Chapel Hill, North Carolina, on May 5, 1988.

In 2016, Lumpkin was inducted into the Georgia Writers Hall of Fame. In 2020 she was inducted into the Georgia Women of Achievement Hall of Fame.

Lumpkin and her sisters; Grace Lumpkin and Elizabeth Lumpkin Glenn were the subjects of Jacqueline Dowd Hall's Sisters and Rebels: A Struggle for the Soul of America (2019).

== Notable works ==
Books

- The Family: A Study of Member Roles (1933))
- Shutdowns in the Connecticut Valley (1934)
- Child Workers in America with Dorothy Wolf Douglas (1937)
- The South in Progress (1940)
- The Making of a Southerner (1947)
- The Emancipation of Angelina Grimke (1974)
- Eli Hill: A novel of Reconstruction (2020)

Articles

- Factors in the commitment of correctional school girls in Wisconsin (1931)

== See also ==
- Grace Lumpkin
