= Frances Harriet Williams =

American activist and civil servant (1898–1992)

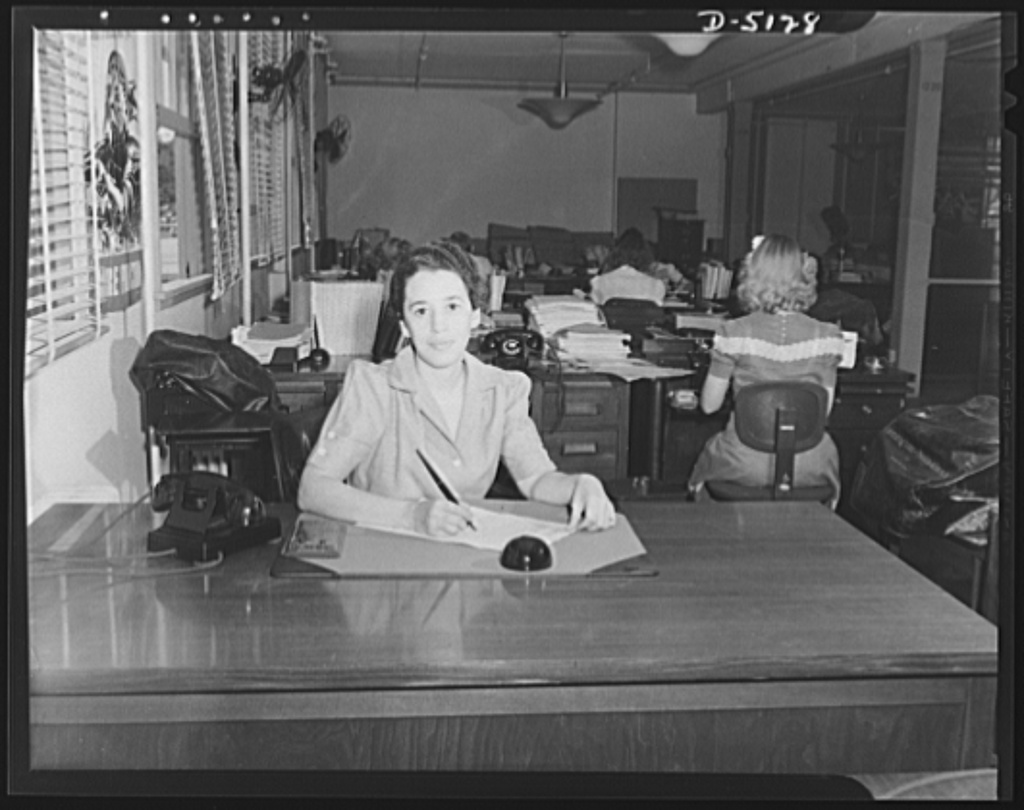
- Williams in the early 1940s
- Born: 1898; Danville, Kentucky, U.S.
- Died: 1992 (aged 93–94); Newton, Massachusetts, U.S.
- Education: University of Cincinnati, Mount Holyoke College (BA), New York School of Social Work (MA), University of Chicago (MA)
- Occupations: Activist, civil servant
- Father: Frank Lunsford Williams

Frances Harriet Williams (1898–1992) was an American activist and civil servant.

She graduated from Mount Holyoke College in 1919 and earned a master's degree in political science from the University of Chicago in 1931.

== Early life and education ==
Frances Harriet Williams was born in 1898 in Danville, Kentucky, to parents Fannie Bell (née Miller) and Frank L. Williams. Williams was raised in Covington, Kentucky, and then St. Louis, Missouri, where she graduated as valedictorian of her class as Sumner High School.

After spending one year at the University of Cincinnati, Williams's mother, Fannie Miller Williams, looked to transfer her youngest daughter to Mount Holyoke College, in Massachusetts. When Mount Holyoke administrators suggested that Frances might be more comfortable elsewhere, the implication was that as an African American she would be ill-suited to studies at an elite, New England women's college. Fannie Miller thought otherwise and insisted that Frances enroll there; she went on to graduate in 1919 earning the distinction of Phi Beta Kappa.

Williams attended the New York School of Social Work (now Columbia School of Social Work), where she earned a master's in social work. At the University of Chicago, she continued her studies, working with Harold Gosnell on his book Negro Politicians: Rise of Negro Politics in Chicago, and earning a master's degree in political science in 1931.

== Career ==
Between 1935 and 1940 she worked as the interracial education secretary for the YWCA of the United States. Williams was among a cadre of women—including Katharine Lumpkin, Juliette Derricotte, and Juanita Jane Saddler—charged with implementing the YWCA's interracial program. Under the auspices of the YWCA, Williams published a series of pamphlets aimed at introducing white girls affiliated with the YWCA with the lives, culture and politics of African American girls and women, including "Pudge and Her Friends," "Pudge Grows Up, and "Pudge Gets a Job," along with The Business Girl Looks at the Negro World. Frances was a member of Alpha Kappa Alpha sorority. In May 1943, she spoke at their 1943 Regional Conference on the role of the college trained woman to the war effort in the field of consumer problems.

From 1940 to 1946 she was the adviser on race relations for the federal Office of Price Administration. During 1947, she was assistant to the executive secretary of Harry Truman's President's Committee on Civil Rights. Later she would serve as a legislative assistant to senator Herbert H. Lehman of New York State.

Williams served on the board of the National Association for the Advancement of Colored People (NAACP).

== Death and legacy ==
She died in 1992 in Newton, Massachusetts.

The Frances Harriet Williams Award for scholastic excellence was established by her family at Mount Holyoke College in 1981.
