= St. Louis Sentinel =

US weekly newspaper

The St. Louis Sentinel is an African-American-oriented weekly newspaper, founded in 1968 by Howard B. Woods in St. Louis, Missouri. After Woods's death in 1976, his wife Jane Woods took over as publisher.

== See also ==
- African American newspapers
- St. Louis American
- St. Louis Argus
- Suburban Journals
