= McKinney Hall =

Historic building in Columbia, Missouri

Coordinates: 38°57′6.6″N 92°19′56.7″W

McKinney Building
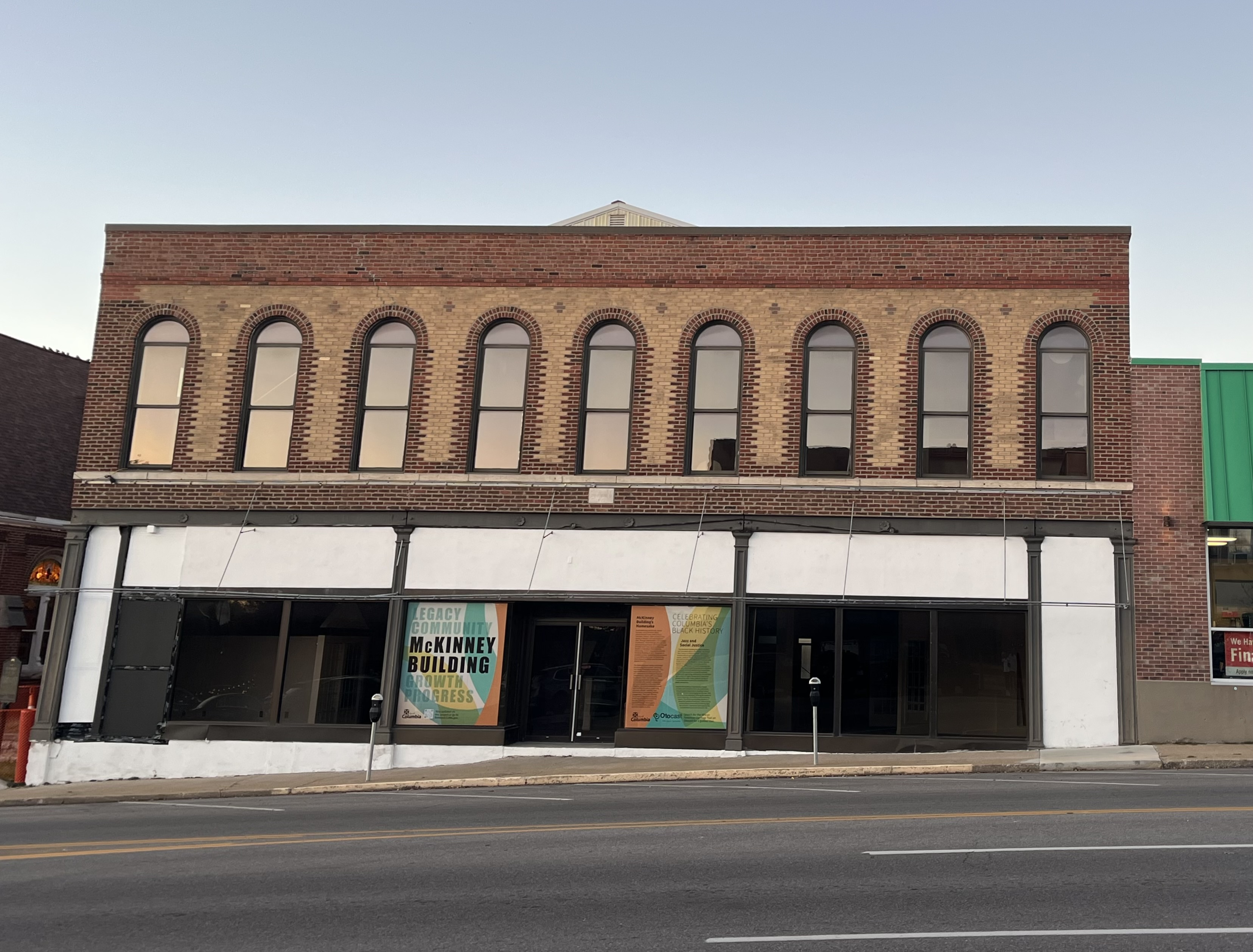
- McKinney Hall Building - Nov. 2025
- Interactive map of the McKinney Building area

General information
- Type: Commercial / Community center
- Location: 411 E. Broadway, Columbia, Missouri, United States
- Current tenants: Vacant (under planning)
- Completed: 1917
- Owner: City of Columbia (since 2023)

The McKinney Building is a historic two-story brick building located at 411 E. Broadway in Columbia, Missouri. Built in 1917 by Frank McKinney, a Black day laborer, the building served as an important cultural and social center for Columbia's African American community during the era of segregation. Its second-floor dance hall, known as McKinney Hall, hosted performances by prominent jazz musicians including Bennie Moten and Count Basie. It was one of the few venues in the city that welcomed Black patrons. Upon its completion one Kansas City, Missouri newspaper called it "the dream of the race realized"

The building is one of 24 locations on Columbia's African American Heritage Trail and is situated near the historic Sharp End district, Second Baptist Church, and the home of pianist Blind Boone. The City of Columbia purchased the building in August 2023 for approximately $1.7 million, with plans to restore it as a cultural landmark.

== History ==
=== Construction and early years ===
Frank "Fred" McKinney, a Black day laborer, saved money to purchase property on East Broadway and paid approximately $5,000 to construct the brick building in 1917. McKinney specifically designed the building to include public restrooms, which was significant during the Jim Crow era as it was one of the only buildings in Columbia where Black residents could access such facilities.

The first floor housed a rotating series of storefronts, while the second floor operated as McKinney Hall, a community dance hall and gathering space.

=== Jazz venue and community center ===
During the 1920s and 1930s, McKinney Hall became a prominent venue for jazz performances and community events. According to former promoter Edward Tibbs, speaking to the Columbia Missourian in 1981. Count Basie performed at the venue in 1932 and 1935 while still known as William Basie, a pianist inBennie Moten's Band. Sam Griffith, Director of Jazz Studies at the University of Missouri, has noted the building's historical significance, stating: "The fact that we have a venue that's still standing from those times, I find to be incredibly significant."

Beyond musical performances, McKinney Hall served as a venue for church pageants, community meetings, Douglass High School proms, and political gatherings. In February 1921, Walthall M. Moore, the first Black legislator to serve in the Missouri General Assembly, delivered a speech on civil rights and the future of Black Americans to a packed crowd at the building. The hall also hosted faculty from Lincoln University and other Black leaders from across Missouri.

The building is located one block south of the historic Sharp End business district, which served as the commercial and cultural hub for Columbia's Black community from the early 1900s until its demolition during urban renewal in the 1960s.

=== Later uses ===
Following Frank McKinney's death in 1934, the building was sold to William "W.G." Tallen, a Greek immigrant from Randolph County. Tallen converted the first floor into a candy store and brewery, and the dance floor was dismantled. In the 1950s, the second floor was converted into a chicken hatchery, which operated until the early 1960s.

In May 1978, the McKinney Building was added to a historic inventory by the Missouri State Historic Preservation Office. Later that year, the building was converted into a two-story department store by Ancel Proctor and Richard Halterman, who added a grand stairwell and skylights. In 1993, Rick Rother purchased the building and converted the first floor into a physical therapy office while using the second floor as a living space.

=== City acquisition and preservation ===
In August 2023, the Columbia City Council unanimously approved the acquisition of the McKinney Building for approximately $1.7 million. The city's Historic Preservation Commission had previously designated the building as a "Most Notable Property."

A 15-member Mayor's Task Force was appointed to determine the building's future use, with members representing organizations including the Columbia NAACP, Second Baptist Church, the Boone County Historical Society, the University of Missouri School of Music Jazz Studies program, the J.W. "Blind" Boone Foundation, and the Sharp End Heritage Committee.

Proposed uses for the building include a downtown welcome center, an African American history museum, a restored jazz performance venue, and office space for Black-led nonprofit organizations.

In September 2025, the building underwent emergency maintenance to stabilize a failed column.
