= Kathleen Madigan =

American comedian and TV personality (born 1965)

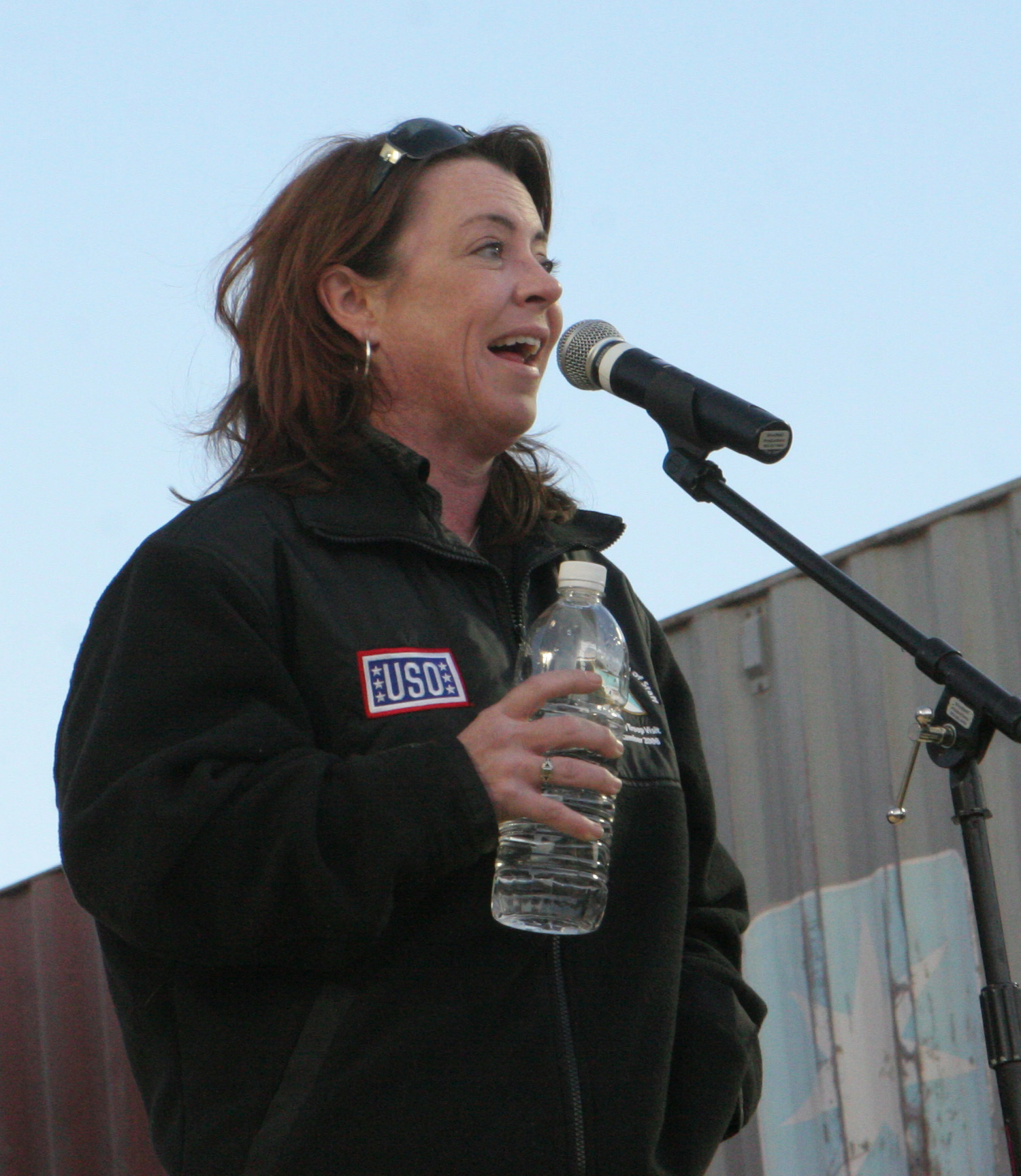
- Madigan in December 2008 during the USO Holiday Tour
- Born: September 30, 1965 (age 61); Florissant, Missouri, U.S.
- Education: Southern Illinois University Edwardsville

Comedy career
- Medium: Stand-up; television
- Genre: Observational comedy
- Subjects: Interpersonal relationships, everyday life

Kathleen Madigan (born September 30, 1965) is an American stand-up comedian and TV personality. In addition to her stand-up comedy performances, she is a regular guest on a variety of U.S. television programs.

== Early life and education ==
Madigan was born in Florissant, Missouri, one of seven children in an Irish Catholic family. Her father Jack Madigan was an attorney, and her mother Vicki Madigan is a nurse. She grew up mostly in Florissant, a suburb of St. Louis, although the family also lived for periods of time in House Springs, Missouri, and in the Lake of the Ozarks region of central Missouri. Madigan received the first eight years of her education largely in private Catholic schools, although she also attended the public School of the Osage. It was there she excelled as a student athlete, participating in volleyball, track, and basketball. In the latter, she set a record by winning the 1978 Mid-Missouri Hoops Shoot Championship. At the time she was 4' 5" tall and set a record as the shortest person to win the event. She shot under-handed, sinking 14 of 15 attempts.

Madigan attended McCluer North High School, graduating in 1983. She admitted in a 2012 interview with St. Louis Magazine, however, that she participated in few activities like float decorating or prom, choosing instead to work at a steakhouse where she could make up to $200 per night. Madigan attended University of Missouri–St. Louis for two years, but, according to Madigan, all she did was accumulate $7,000 in campus parking tickets. At Southern Illinois University Edwardsville, she earned a B.A. in journalism in 1988. While at SIUE, she was in charge of the student newspaper and also served an internship with the St. Louis Blues professional ice hockey team.

== Professional career ==
Madigan first took a job in print journalism, working for the St. Louis-area Suburban Journals newspapers as well as the publications department of the Missouri Athletic Club. At the same time, she performed stand-up during "open mic" nights at St. Louis area comedy clubs. She credits her father, Jack, with encouraging her to try a comedy career. Her growing popularity at these soon led to the offer of a paying job in stand-up from The Funny Bone, a nationwide chain of comedy clubs. With a thirty-week booking of guaranteed dates, Madigan gave up her jobs in Missouri. She cites Ron White, Richard Jeni and Lewis Black among her influences in her early comedy club days.

Among the TV shows and specials Madigan has appeared on are Last Comic Standing, I Love the 90s: Part Deux, I Love the '80s 3-D, and Celebrity Poker Showdown. She also starred in her own HBO Half-Hour Comedy Special and a Comedy Central Presents special. She is a veteran of The Tonight Show with Jay Leno, Late Night with Conan O'Brien, Late Show with David Letterman, and The Bob and Tom Show. Madigan has twice participated in USO shows in support of American troops, touring both Iraq and Afghanistan along with fellow comedians. She sometimes writes material for other comedians, as was the case in 2004 and 2005 when she was a writer for Garry Shandling when he hosted the Emmy Awards telecast. In 2016, she made an appearance on Jerry Seinfeld's web series Comedians in Cars Getting Coffee.

In the wake of her touring stoppage due to the COVID-19 pandemic Madigan launched her own comedy podcast in August 2020, Madigan's Pubcast. On Saturday, December 19, 2020, she appeared on Byron Allen's Comics Unleashed episode of "Girls Gone Wild" on CBS.

== Honors ==
In 1996, Madigan won "Funniest Female Stand-Up Comic" at the American Comedy Awards.

== Personal life ==
Madigan is single and lives in Nashville. She also owns a farm in the Midwest and spends "inordinate amounts of time" with her family there. She has four brothers and two sisters. She has often cited her father as a source of her comic material as well as an example of a positive work ethic.

== Media ==
=== CDs ===
- Kathleen Madigan (1998), later reissued as Live (2000)
- Shallow Happy Thoughts for the Soul (2002)
- In Other Words (2006)
- Gone Madigan (2011)
- Madigan Again (2013)
- Bothering Jesus (2016)

=== DVDs ===
- In Other Words (2005)
- Gone Madigan (2011)
- Madigan Again (2013)
- Bothering Jesus (2016)

== Television appearances ==
- Lewis Black's Root of All Evil - (Performer, Consulting Producer, and Writer)
- One Night Stand HBO
- Truly Funny Women, Lifetime
- Kathleen Madigan: Bothering Jesus, Netflix
- Comics Unleashed with Byron Allen, CBS, December 19, 2020
- Kathleen Madigan: Hunting Bigfoot, 2023, Amazon Prime Video
- Kathleen Madigan: The Family Thread, 2025, Amazon Prime Video
