= Vashon High School =

American high school in St. Louis

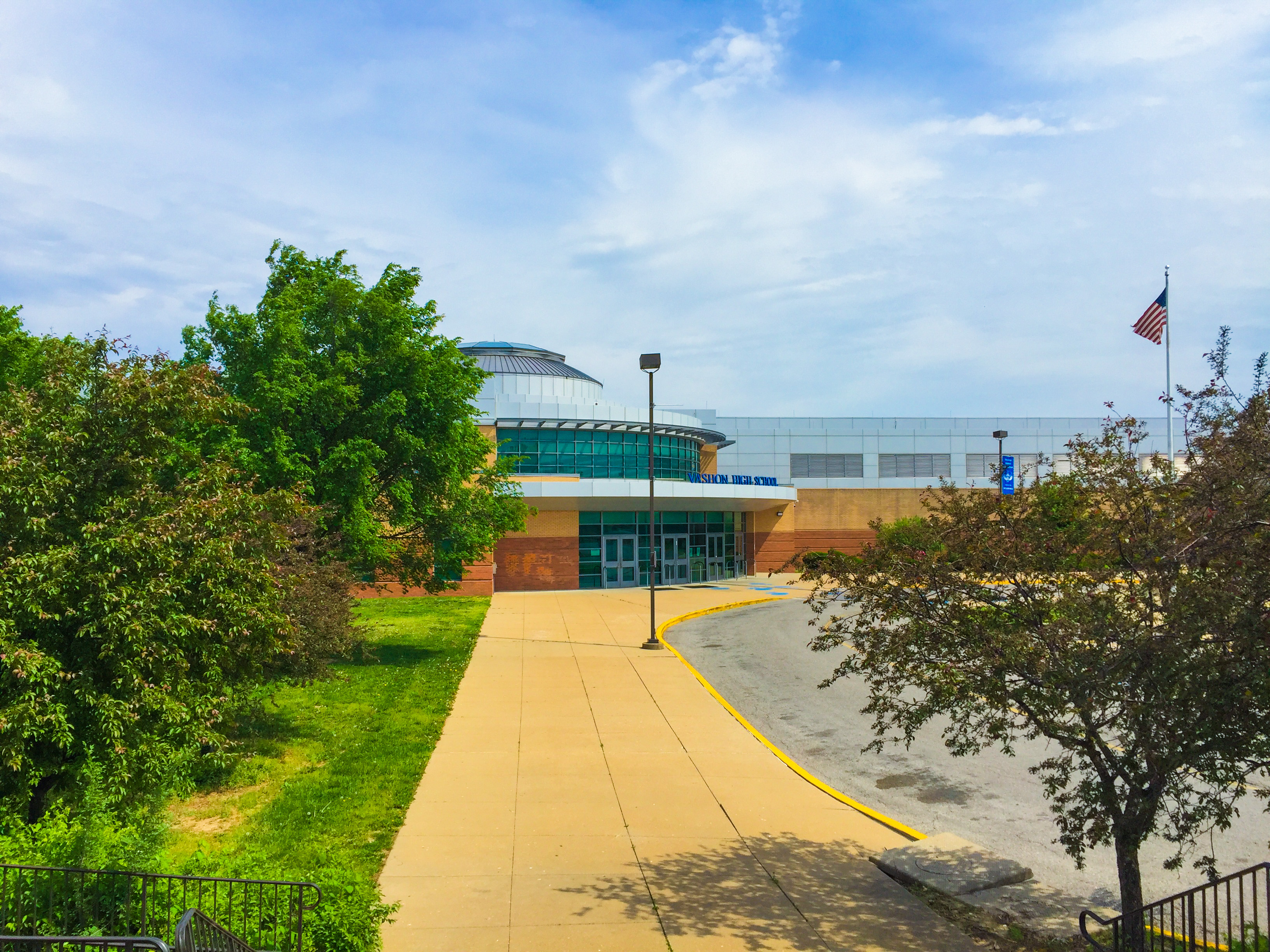
- Entrance to Vashon High School, May 2018

Location
- 3035 Cass Avenue; St. Louis, Missouri 63106; United States; 38.6479°N 90.2212°W

Information
- Type: Public comprehensive high school
- Established: September 6, 1927
- School district: St. Louis Public Schools
- Superintendent: Millicent Borishade
- Principal: Ethan Randall
- Staff: 40.00 (FTE)
- Grades: 9–12
- Enrollment: 616 (2023–24)
- Student to teacher ratio: 15.40
- Colors: Blue and white
- Song: Vashon We Love
- Athletics conference: Public High League
- Nickname: Wolverines
- Newspaper: The Herald
- Yearbook: Blue and White
- Website: vashon.slps.org

Vashon High School is a high school of the St. Louis Public Schools in St. Louis, Missouri. When it opened in 1927, it was the second high school for black students in St. Louis.

== History ==
Designed by Rockwell M. Milligan, the school opened on September 11, 1927, and it was named in honor of two African-American educators: George Boyer Vashon, the first black graduate of Oberlin College, and his son, John Boyer Vashon. Located at 3026 Laclede Avenue, the school was built for slightly less than $1.2 million ($22,241,379 today). Vashon was the second high school built for black students in the St. Louis Public Schools, after Sumner High School.

Four members of the Vashon glee club created the popular singing group The Four Vagabonds in 1933. From 1935 to 1949, Vashon's boys basketball program won six state titles as part of the Missouri Negro Interscholastic Athletic Association. Vashon was barred from joining the Missouri State High School Activities Association until 1949, and between 1949 and 1954, it was prohibited from participating in both MNIAA tournaments and MSHSAA state tournaments.

In June 1963, the school moved to the Hadley Vocational-Technical High School building at 3405 Bell Avenue, and the original building became part of Harris–Stowe State University. The Bell Avenue building had been built in the early 1930s with large shop classrooms that were subsequently divided into classrooms and offices with partition walls, causing noise problems throughout the school. Its architectural design also strongly resembled a factory, and according to a local newspaper report, "the main school building, gym and auditorium make one think the people inside might be manufacturing cars or widgets." The move was accompanied by protests in the local community and a student march against the transfer.

After the transfer, Vashon students were offered more vocational classes, including auto repair, fashion design, cosmetology, dry cleaning, woodworking, shoe repair, drafting, and commercial cooking. From 1974 to 2006, Vashon's boys basketball team was coached by Floyd Irons, a Vashon alumnus who became one of the winningest basketball coaches in Missouri history. Irons coached the team to four state championships in the 1980s.

In 1990, the Board of Education considered several options to deal with noise problems and facilities issues at Vashon; among the options were closure of Vashon, partial renovation, full renovation, or complete demolition and replacement. Ultimately the Board decided against closure and opted for partial renovation of the building; support from the school's alumni and the school's strong boys basketball program played a role in the decision to keep the school open. In 1994, the Vashon boys basketball team won another state championship under Irons.

In August 2002, Vashon moved again, to a new building at 3035 Cass Avenue designed by Kennedy and Associates and built at a cost of $47.3 million. The boys' basketball team won five state championships in the 2000s: in 2000, 2001, 2002, 2004, and 2006. In 2005, the school's boys' basketball program was ranked as the top program in the United States by USA Today.

In 2006, the Riverfront Times, a local newspaper, published an investigative report that detailed extensive allegations of misconduct by Floyd Irons as coach at Vashon. The allegations eventually led the Missouri State High School Activities Association (MSHSAA) to strip Vashon of its 2001, 2002, and 2006 titles due to violations of MSHSAA rules on recruiting and eligibility. In July 2006, Irons was dismissed as coach and administrator at Vashon, and he was replaced as head coach by Anthony Bonner, a retired NBA player and Vashon alumnus. Bonner himself resigned in 2009.

== Athletics and activities ==
Since 1934, the school has won 14 state basketball championships—six as a member of the Missouri Negro Interscholastic Athletic Association and then eight as a member of the Missouri State High School Activities Association.

For the 2011–12 school year, the school offered 18 activities approved by the Missouri State High School Activities Association (MSHSAA): baseball, boys and girls basketball, cheerleading, boys and girls cross country, football, music activities, boys and girls soccer, softball, speech and debate, boys and girls tennis, boys and girls track and field, girls volleyball, and wrestling. In addition to its current activities, its students have won several state championships:

- Boys basketball: 1935, 1936, 1944, 1947, 1948, 1949, 1971, 1983, 1985, 1986, 1988, 1994, 2000, 2004, 2016, 2017
- Boys cross country: 1956, 1958, 1960
- Boys track and field: 1984

The school also has produced one individual wrestling state champion.

== Notable people ==
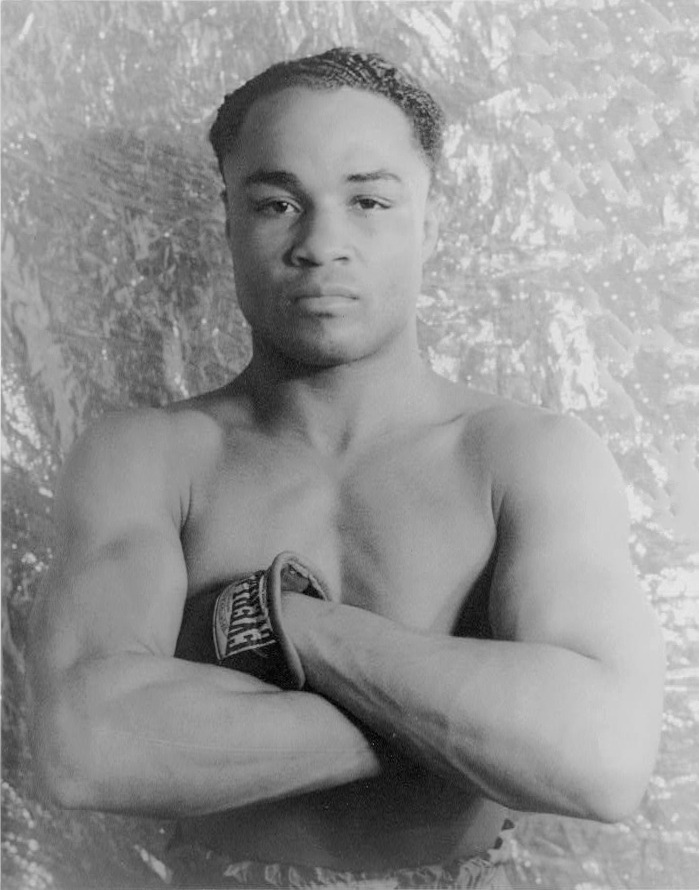
Alumnus Henry Armstrong became a world champion boxer.

=== Faculty ===
- Anthony Bonner (born 1968), professional basketball player
- Frank Lunsford Williams (1864–1953) principal from 1932 to 1940

=== Alumni ===
- Virgil Akins, world champion boxer
- Devon Alexander, world champion boxer
- Henry Armstrong, world champion boxer
- Bob Beeks, NFL official (1968–91), first African-American official to work in five Super Bowls
- Anthony Bonner, professional basketball player (later became faculty and basketball coach at Vashon)
- Jerry Jerome Brown Jr, NFL and CFL football player; last played with the Dallas Cowboys.
- Butler By'not'e, professional football player
- Mac Cody, professional football player
- Chick Finney, jazz pianist
- Will Franklin, professional football player
- Lloyd L. Gaines, key player in Missouri ex rel. Gaines v. Canada, which desegregated the University of Missouri School of Law
- Vivian Gibson, Author of "The Last Children of Mill Creek" documenting her childhood growing up in Mill Creek Valley, a segregated community in the heart of St. Louis that was destroyed by Urban Renewal.===Alumni===
- Grant Green, jazz guitarist
- Donny Hathaway, singer and songwriter
- Eddie Hopson, Olympic boxer (class of 1990) and IBF Super Feather weight Champion (1995)
- Elston Howard, professional baseball player, first African-American player for the New York Yankees
- Oliver Lee Jackson, painter, sculptor, printmaker, and educator.
- Terry Kennedy, politician, former activist, and journalist
- Roscoe L. Koontz, pioneer in health physics
- Jimmy McKinney, professional basketball player
- Theodore McMillian, judge of the Missouri Court of Appeals and United States Court of Appeals for the Eighth Circuit; first African-American judge on either court
- Leon Spinks, U.S. Olympic and professional boxer best known for beating Muhammad Ali
- Michael Spinks, champion Olympic and professional boxer
- Norris Stevenson, first African-American scholarship athlete for the University of Missouri football program
- Clark Terry, jazz musician
- Morris Towns, professional football player
- Quincy Troupe, author and poet (attended Vashon, but transferred to Beaumont)
- Quincy Trouppe, former MLB player (Cleveland Indians)
- Maxine Waters, member of the United States House of Representatives
