= Suburban Journals =

Group of newspapers serving St. Louis, Missouri, US

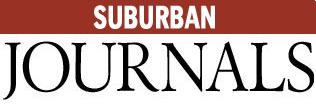
- Type: Chain of community newspapers
- Format: Broadsheet
- Owner: Lee Enterprises
- Founded: Various
- Headquarters: 14522 South Outer 40 Road; Town and Country, Missouri 63017
- Sister newspapers: St. Louis Post-Dispatch
- Website: suburbanjournals.stltoday.com

Suburban Journals of Greater St. Louis was a group of publications in the St. Louis region owned by Lee Enterprises. The chain served St. Louis and St. Charles counties in Missouri and Madison, Monroe and St. Clair counties in Illinois.

It published community newspapers, the Ladue News, Savvy Family, St. Louis' Best Bridal and Feast.

Publications were grouped in regional offices in Town and Country, Missouri and Collinsville, Illinois.

The chain for years was distributed to homes for free. The papers became subscription-only in November 2008, a move decried by long-time employees as "the beginning of the end.".

The chain's main competition was the Webster-Kirkwood Times, The South County Times and Call Newspapers in Missouri and The Alton Telegraph, Edwardsville Intelligencer, and Belleville News-Democrat in Illinois.

== Relationship with St. Louis Post-Dispatch ==
The newspapers are independent of the Lee-owned St. Louis Post-Dispatch, but share some resources, such a technical assistance and printing.

The companies, which were previously owned by Pulitzer Inc., also share a common website, stltoday.com.

The papers were printed at Donnelly Printing Company on Latty Avenue in north St. Louis County for years, then later at the Pulitzer Publishing Center in Maryland Heights, Missouri.

== Notable staff ==
- Comedian Kathleen Madigan worked for the Suburban Journals for approximately 18 months in the late 1980s after graduation from SIU-Edwardsville.
- Steve Pokin, a reporter and columnist for the St. Charles Journal, in November 2007 broke the story of Megan Meier, a Dardenne Prairie, Missouri, teen who committed suicide after being scorned by a fictitious friend on the social networking site MySpace.
- Todd Smith, a reporter for the Kirkwood-Webster Journal, was shot in the hand during the February 2008 shooting inside City Hall in Kirkwood, Mo. He was later laid off as part of cutbacks.
- Charles F. Wiegert, worked for the South County Journal from 1974-1991. Owner of River City Sports and VP of Fanball Sports, and later VP of CDM Sports. He served as Treasure for Fantasy Sports Trade Association from 1997 to 2015. He currently serves as the Grand Master for the State of Missouri for 2023-2024.
- Sir Dennis Burkholder, worked for the North County Journal in the 1980's, and later joined Transcontinental in Montreal Canada as a regional executive he later created and founded the marketing firm Mad Moose Media which provides services for small and medium size companies. Sir Dennis was knighted in 2004 by the Royal Order of Scotland.

Tom Lange, Sports Editor 1985-88, went on to become Director of Communications at the US Soccer Federation in Chicago, where he led communications for the host Federation of the 1994 FIFA World Cup, the first World Cup held in the United States.

== History ==
Most of the publications currently owned by Suburban Journals date to the early 1900s as independent newspapers. Many were in direct competition with one another.

By the 1930s, the big adversaries in south St. Louis were the South Side Journal —renamed from the Cherokee News after Frank X. Bick bought it in 1933 — and 39th Street Neighborhood News, launched in the summer of 1922 by ex-Post Dispatch composing room worker Bernard H. Nordmann. Bick's son, Frank C. Bick, helped shape the fledgling chain, which grew to include 10 publications in St. Louis City, as well as St. Louis, Jefferson and Franklin counties. Meanwhile, in northern St. Louis, Arthur Morgan Donnelly bought the Wellston Local in 1935 and rebranded it as the Wellston Journal, focusing more on north and central areas of the city. Donnelly, with his sons James and Robert, later shifted attention to northern and western St. Louis County, St. Charles County and eventually spread eastwards across the Mississippi River to include the Illinois counties of Madison, St. Clair, and Monroe; ultimately publishing 25 separate newspapers in the bi-state metropolitan St. Louis area.

The Donnelly and Bick families competed against one another until 1970, when operations were eventually and cooperatively formalized as sister companies, creating the Suburban Newspapers of Greater St. Louis; more commonly known as Suburban Journals. Circulation topped 820,000 households, making it one of the largest free-distribution community newspaper groups in the United States. In May 1984, the group was snapped up by Ingersoll Publications Co., a firm headed by Ralph Ingersoll II, whose father lead the innovative PM newspaper in 1940s New York City.

Ingersoll, who wanted to compete with the Post-Dispatch and now defunct St. Louis Globe-Democrat, used high-risk junk bonds and the advice of his friend Michael Milken to finance his acquisitions and eventually launched the failed St. Louis Sun. Ingersoll was bought out by his partner and financier, E.M. Warburg, Pincus & Co., which formed the Journal Register Co., the owner of 25 daily newspapers, including the New Haven Register and Alton Telegraph. The chain became the Suburban Journals of Greater St. Louis.

In 1997, it bought the Ladue News. The company in 1999 had revenues of $151 million. Pulitzer, which owned the Post-Dispatch and 11 other daily newspapers, in June 2000 bought the company, which then had 38 papers. It cost $165 million.

Founder's grandson Robert Donnelly, Jr. rejoined the firm as an employee of Pulitzer, Inc. 16 years after the family's sale to Ingersoll Publications Co., making him a third-generation Publisher at Suburban Journals. Pulitzer later sold the group to Lee in summer 2005 for $1.46 billion. In early 2007, Lee reorganized the chain's management and eliminated publisher positions in the nine offices.

When the chain was acquired as part of Pulitzer's purchase out by Lee in 2005, the Suburban Journals published 35 papers. The bad economy, the effect of the Internet on the newspaper business and the weight of the debt Lee took on in the purchase of Pulitzer combined to force major layoffs and consolidation in the chain. In 2009, the chain was cut to 10 editions. Additional cuts in 2011 brought the number of editions to six. Two more editions were cut in 2013. In August 2014 the Collinsville Herald and the Granite City Press-Record were combined to create the Madison County Journal.

Feast was launched in August 2010.

== Editions ==
- Belleville Journal
- Cahokia-Dupo Journal
- Central West End Journal
- Chesterfield Journal
- Clayton Citizen Journal
- Collinsville Herald Journal
- East St. Louis Journal
- Edwardsville Journal
- Fairview Heights Journal
- Granite City Press-Record Journal
- Jefferson County Journal
- Mehlville Journal
- Meramec Journal
- Millstadt/Smithton Enterprise
- Monroe County Clarion
- News Democrat Journal
- North County Journal
- Northwest County Journal
- North Side Journal
- O'Fallon/Fairview Journal
- Press Journal
- St. Charles County Journal (two editions)
- St. Louis County Star
- St. Peters Journal
- South City Journal
- South County Journal
- South Side Journal
- Tri-County Journal
- Warrenton Journal
- Webster-Kirkwood Journal
- Wentzville Journal
- West County Citizen Journal

== See also ==
- Riverfront Times
- St. Louis American
- St. Louis Beacon

== Sources ==
- A 2001 Riverfront Times article about the relationship between the Post-Dispatch and Suburban Journals reporters News Hole
- An article about Ingersoll
