= Frank Lunsford Williams =

American educator (1864–1953)

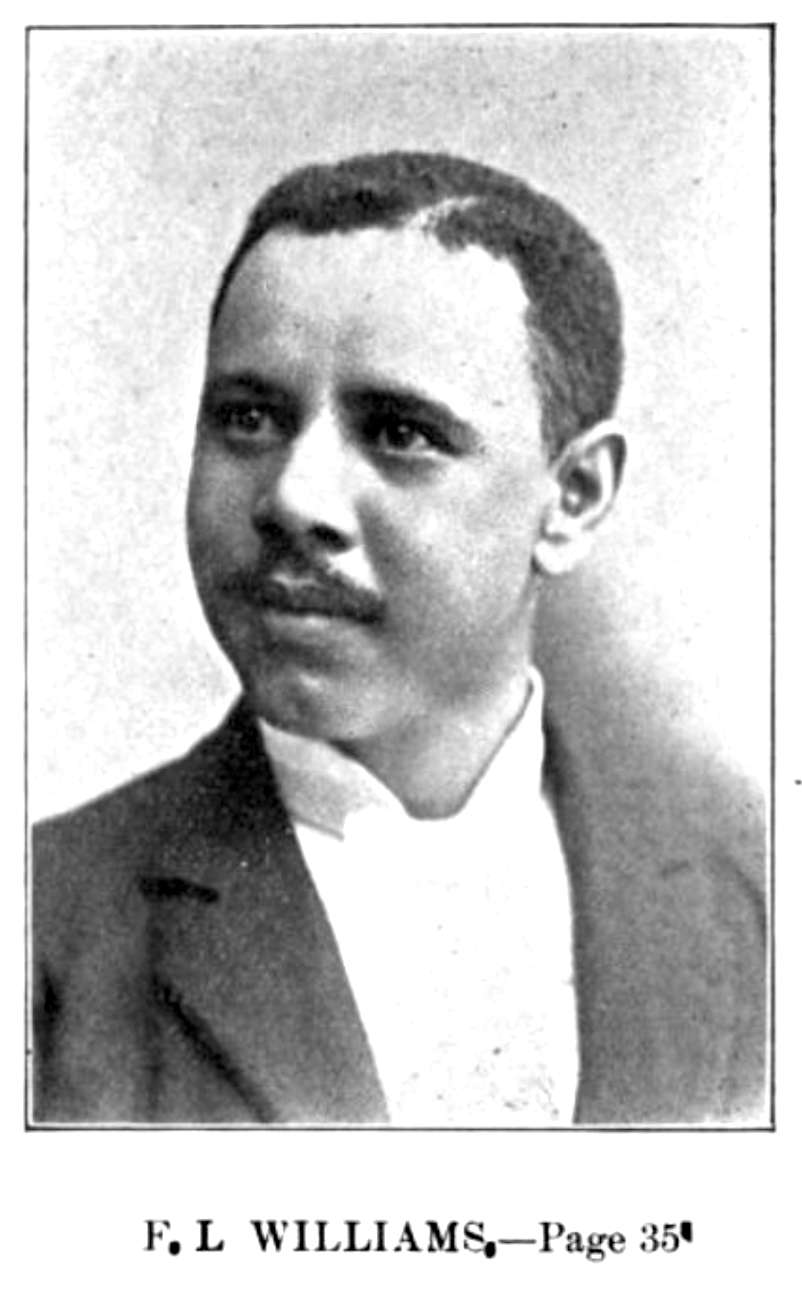
- Born: October 18, 1864; Louisville, Kentucky, U.S.
- Died: February 13, 1953 (aged 88); St. Louis, Missouri, U.S.
- Burial place: Washington Park Cemetery
- Education: Berea College (BA), University of Cincinnati (MA)
- Occupation(s): Educator, head teacher, businessman, real estate investor, Black community leader, columnist
- Spouse: Fannie Bell Miller (m. 1891)
- Children: 3, including Frances Harriet Williams

Frank Lunsford Williams Sr. (1864 – 1953) was an American educator, businessman, real estate investor, newspaper columnist, and civic leader of the Black community. He was associated with the St. Louis Public Schools for 32 years; and he was the namesake of Williams Elementary School in Greater Ville, St. Louis.

== Early life and education ==
Frank Lunsford Williams was born on October 18, 1864, in Louisville, Kentucky.

Williams attended Berea College in Berea, Kentucky, and graduated in 1889; and he received a master's degree in 1908 from the University of Cincinnati.

In 1891, he married Fannie Bell Miller from Danville, Kentucky; and together they had one son and three daughters including Frances Harriet Williams.

== Career ==
From 1900 to 1908, Williams was the principal at William Grant High School in Covington, Kentucky, succeeding Samuel L. Singer. While living in Covington, he was one of the founders of the Covington Progressive Building and Loan Association.

From 1908 to 1929, Williams had been the principal at the Sumner High School in St. Louis. He was replaced as principal in 1930 by George D. Bramley.

Williams wrote a weekly newspaper column for the St. Louis Argus. He also owned many rental building and worked in real estate investment. Williams was the president of New Age Building and Loan Association, founded in 1915 and active until his death in 1953.

From 1932 to 1940, Williams had been the principal at Vashon High School in St. Louis.

He was an appointed a member of the St. Louis Housing Authority; was on the board of curators of Lincoln University of Missouri; and was a chairman of the board of managers of the Pine Street YWCA. Williams was on the St. Louis Bond Commission, and he led in the fund drive for the Homer G. Phillips Hospital.

He was the namesake of Williams Elementary School, active 1964 to 2008, at 3955 St. Ferdinand Avenue in Greater Ville, St. Louis.
