= Nannie Mitchell =

American newspaper publisher (1887–1975)

- Born: Nannie Flowers Ross; 1887; Alexander City, Alabama
- Died: January 25, 1975 (aged 87–88); St. Louis, Missouri
- Occupations: Publisher, Journalist
- Known for: Founding and leading the St. Louis Argus

Nannie Mitchell (1887–1975) was an American newspaper publisher, writer, and founder of the St. Louis Argus, a newspaper that advocated for the Black community in St. Louis, Missouri.

== Early life ==
Nannie Flowers Ross was born in 1887 in Alexander City, Alabama. Her parents were Nancy and William Ross, who had been previously enslaved. After she graduated, Mitchell's neighbors and friends gave her money to earn an education degree at Tuskegee Institute in 1904. However, she chose to marry William E. Mitchell, who had already graduated college, and they moved to St. Louis.

== Career ==
The 1904 World's Fair was held in St. Louis, and the Mitchells and William's brother, Joseph E. Mitchell, traveled there via mule-drawn wagon to find work. Mitchell was a chambermaid along with her sister-in-law, Mattie, and her brother-in-law was a houseman, all working at a large hotel for tourists coming to the fair. William worked for a packinghouse because he felt he deserved a non-service job as a college graduate.

=== Argus founding ===
In 1907, Nannie, William, and Joseph left their jobs and created the We Shall Rise Insurance Company. Soon after, Joseph moved to the Western Union Relief Association, and he eventually became a general manager there. He started a trade paper for the association called the St. Louis Argus, which was very popular among their clients. The paper had five columns and was 11 by 15.5 inches. Joseph, William, and Nannie distributed the paper among local churches and soon put their focus solely on the newspaper. Joseph was the managing editor, William produced it, and Nannie was its bookkeeper and office worker. The paper was distributed weekly, and it focused on issues important to Black Americans, speaking out on racial issues, civil rights, politics, and local business.

The Argus was officially registered as second-class mail with the St. Louis post office on April 5, 1912. Joseph, William, Benjamin W. James, and Lewis E. Hawkins incorporated the paper as a business on March 27, 1916, with the four sharing the board of directors between them. Joseph had the most shares, with William following. Although Nannie had helped with the paper from the beginning, her involvement was not regularly acknowledged for decades.

During the Great Depression, the Argus was struggling to stay in business. Hence, the Mitchells took out a second mortgage on their home to keep it afloat. They had lost almost all their advertisers, and couldn't afford to pay anyone involved a salary, including Nannie and the other Mitchells. During this period, many employees left. In 1937, for the paper's 25th anniversary, Nannie was credited as the paper's Superintendent of Mailing and Distribution. A special anniversary paper contained photos of its employees, and Nannie's was in a position opposite Mattie Mitchell, near their husbands but outside of the central photos of their husbands and the other editors. By the 1940s, the paper was successful again and the Mitchells would pass out refreshments to customers as they waited to get copies.

=== President of the Argus ===
The two Mitchell brothers had divided much of the paper's management between them, with William responsible for printing and publishing, and Joseph for writing and advertising. In 1939, Joseph had an operation to treat his trigeminal neuralgia, but over the next years his illness worsened and he had to step back from work. William took over many of his duties in 1941, but he died in 1945. In September 1945, Nannie's byline replaced William's in the paper's masthead as Mrs. William Mitchell, business manager. By 1948, Nannie and her grandson, Frank Jr., began to take over most of Joseph's responsibilities. In 1951, Nannie and Frank Sr. would drive to Joseph's house several times a week to discuss business updates with him. Joseph died in 1952, and made the remaining Mitchells all equal shareholders in the Argus. At the March 16, 1953, shareholders meeting, Nannie was elected president. She appointed Frank Sr. to be publisher.

In 1954, Edwina Mitchell, Joseph's widow, and some shareholders from the board of the Argus sued Nannie and Frank Sr. for their shares of the newspaper, claiming that the trust Joseph had set up was invalid. A circuit court ruled for Nannie's side in 1956, and the Supreme Court of Missouri later affirmed the ruling.

During the 1950s, Nannie and Frank Sr. maintained the Argus's reputation as the most notable Black newspaper in St. Louis, and one of the big three newspapers there. However, they needed to increase readership at a time when larger newspapers began writing stories for Black audiences, threatening their hold on readers. Nannie and Frank Sr. began offering creative contests to engage their readers, and these became very successful. They included Mother of the Year, Father of the Year, and Minister of the Year, as well as Argus Lucky Bucks, a lottery-based hunt for reader names hidden in the regular paper.

The Argus, like the Afro American and Defender, had started cooking schools during the Great Depression to connect with their communities. The Argus's school went on hiatus during World War II, but Nannie and Frank Sr. brought it back during the 1950s as a marketing device. Throughout the 1950s, they expanded it to include beauty courses, pageant and choral competitions, with musical acts and large corporate sponsors.

=== Writing career ===
Mitchell began a regular column for the Argus for the paper's fiftieth anniversary, using "mother wit" to discuss current events, whether they related to civil rights or sports. The paper took a middle ground between St. Louis business people and civil rights leaders during this period. Mitchell believed that changes should be made respectfully, while following the law, and often weighed in on city racial politics with those views of moderation in mind.

In February 1968, Mitchell began to write for the St. Louis Post-Dispatch as a columnist. They paid her $15 a column, and this gave her a larger audience, with more white readership, than she had at the Argus. She never syndicated her column, wanting to focus on local issues, and her column ran for 14 years and earned her national recognition.

Mitchell worked until months before her death, with employees remembering her as the first to start work and the last to leave.

== Personal life ==
Nannie married William E. Mitchell in 1904, and that year, they had a son, Frank W. Mitchell. William died in 1945.

In 1952, Nannie married Young Turner, a retired postal worker, and changed her name officially to Nannie Mitchell Turner.

== Awards and honors ==
In 1949, when she became business manager and acting president, the WGN radio station in Chicago produced a story about her life in the Wings over Jordan radio program.

In 1952, she received the inaugural Good Neighbor Award from the KSTL radio station for her service work with church and club groups.

In 1967, the Citizens Committee of 100 honored Mitchell with a dinner for her church and charitable work, where many publishers from the St. Louis newspaper community spoke in her honor.

In 1971, Lane Tabernacle CME Church gave her the Community Service Award.

== Death and legacy ==
Mitchell died on January 25, 1975, at DePaul Hospital and was buried in Washington Cemetery in St. Louis. Upon her death, her grandson Eugene Mitchell assumed full management of the paper. The paper steadily declined in readership for the next few decades, but in 2001, Eddie Hasan bought the Argus, hired two reporters, and advertisements and circulation had increased within a year. The Argus is Missouri's oldest continually Black-owned business.

Ina Boon, the regional NAACP director, praised Mitchell after her death, saying:

Mrs. Mitchell was so unlike anyone else because she never, never said no. It seemed she always had the time and the money and the energy to pitch in and help you get the job done. You could count on her support, her deeds and her graciousness.

Frank L. Stanley Jr., head of the National Newspaper Publishers Association, called Mitchell the "first Lady of Journalism." The same association labeled her "First Lady of the Black Press."
