= George L. Vaughn =

American jurist

George L. Vaughn (circa 1880 – August 24, 1949) was an American lawyer and judge active in St. Louis, Missouri. As a lawyer, he was involved in a prominent civil rights case involving housing discrimination, most notably Shelley v. Kraemer, in which the eviction of an African American family from a white neighborhood was upheld by the Missouri Supreme Court but subsequently overruled by the U.S. Supreme Court.

== Biography ==
He was born in Kentucky. He studied at Lane College and law at Walden University. He became a First Lieutenant in World War I.

Vaughn helped found the Citizens Liberty League in 1919 to help identify and elect more African Americans to public office. He was appointed Justice of the Peace for the 4th District of St. Louis in 1936. He was a delegate to the Democratic National Convention.

Vaughn was part of the Mound City Bar Association of African American lawyers. The American Bar Association did not admit African Americans. He served as the group's first president. Vaughn was appointed Assistant Attorney General in Missouri.

The George L. Vaughn Public Housing Project, a 660 unit complex, was posthumously named in Vaughn's honor in 1957.

He and his wife had two daughters and a son George L. Vaughn Jr. His son was also a lawyer.
