= J. E. Mitchell =

American journalist

- Born: August 1, 1876; Coosa County, Alabama
- Died: December 17, 1952 (aged 76); St. Louis, Missouri
- Occupation: Publisher
- Known for: Founding the St. Louis Argus

Joseph Everett Mitchell (August 1, 1876 – December 17, 1952) was an American journalist known as a publisher, editor, and founder of the St. Louis Argus, a newspaper that advocated for the African-American community in St. Louis. Mitchell was also a co-founder of the Citizen's Liberty League.

== Early years and personal life ==
The fourth of eight children, Mitchell was born on August 1, 1876, in Coosa County, Alabama, to a farming family. As a child, he often worked in his father's sawmill. In 1898, he joined the United States Army and served with the 24th Infantry Regiment until 1901. That same year, after returning home, he married Mattie Elizabeth Thomas.

In 1904, in part because of the World's Fair, the Mitchells relocated to St. Louis, Missouri, where J. E. completed school by taking night classes. His brother and his wife, William and Nannie Mitchell, joined the couple that year, and Nannie, Mattie, and J.E. worked in a hotel hosting the World's Fair tourists. In the 1930s, Mattie Mitchell died and, in 1940, J. E. married Edwina Wright, a St. Louis public school teacher and the daughter of banker Richard R. Wright.

== Career ==
Soon after settling in St. Louis, Mitchell began employment with the Western Union Relief Association, an insurance company where he worked as general manager by 1905. Mitchell grew increasingly focused on the company's newsletter, which eventually grew into the St. Louis Argus newspaper. After the insurance company failed, Mitchell, along with his brother William, registered the St. Louis Argus with the Post Office in 1912. In 1916, they incorporated the St. Louis Argus Publishing Company. Mitchell served as publisher and managing editor.

Outside of the Argus, Mitchell was involved in politics and education. In 1919, he was a founding member of the Citizen's Liberty League, a political organization established to advance the interests of African-Americans in the Republican Party. He was a presidential elector during the Roosevelt administration and served on the Missouri State Board of Education. He also served as the president of the St. Louis NAACP during the early 1930s.

Mitchell retired in 1950 in the wake of health concerns.

== Death and honors ==
Mitchell died December 17, 1952. One of the many people who reached out to his widow was President Truman, who telegraphed to express his sympathies.

In 1954, Mitchell was posthumously honored by Lincoln University, which renamed its Journalism Building to Mitchell Hall. In 1964, St. Louis Public Schools opened Mitchell Elementary School, named for Joseph and his brother William. Mitchell was enshrined in the National Newspaper Publishers Association in 1978.
