= Roscoe L. Koontz =

American physicist (1922 - 1997)

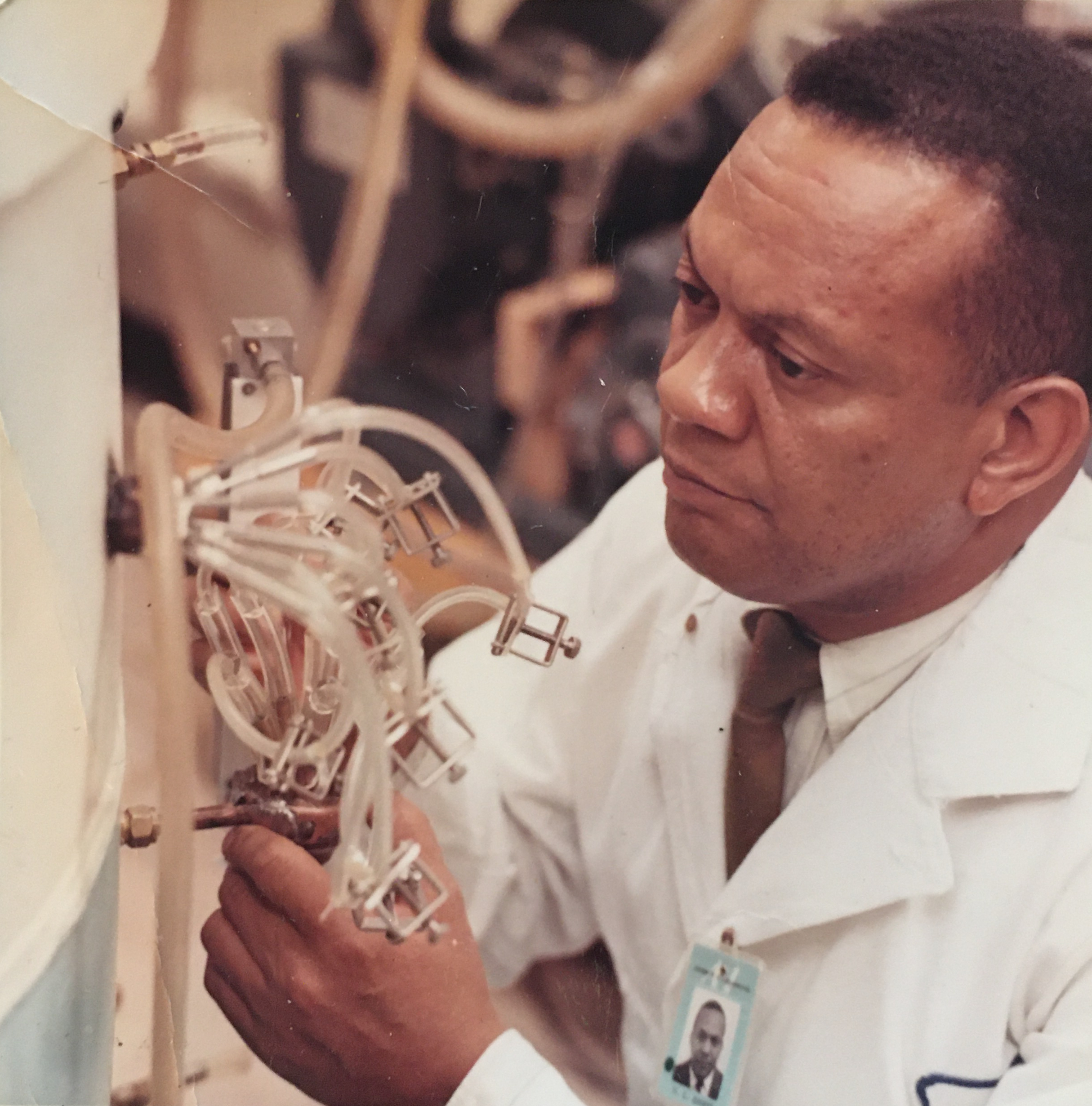
- Born: December 16, 1922; St. Louis, Missouri
- Died: May 17, 1997; Richland, Washington
- Education: Stowes Teachers College; West Virginia State College; Tennessee State University (B.S.); University of Rochester)
- Occupation: Health physicist
- Employer: Atomics International
- Known for: Pioneer in Health Physics; inventing the pinhole gamma-ray camera

Roscoe L. Koontz (December 16, 1922 – May 17, 1997) was an American Health Physicist. Trained as one of the first health physicists through the first Atomic Energy Health Physics Fellowship Training Program at the University of Rochester, Koontz contributed to the development of practices, instrumentation, and techniques to protect people from ionizing radiation. His early research focused on problems of neutron dosimetry, toxicology of uranium, plutonium, and fission products. Most of his career was spent at Atomics International where his key achievements included designing a pinhole gamma ray camera, developing techniques for measuring absolute thermal neutron flux using radioactive indium foils, and helping design and fabricate equipment to automate air and water sampling equipment and radiation activity measuring devices.

== Early life and education ==
Born in St. Louis, Missouri, Koontz graduated from Vashon High School. He began college at Stowes Teachers College, but left for three years to join the U.S. Army during World War II. During his military service, he received technical training at West Virginia State College through a special pre-engineering army training program. After being discharged from the army in 1946, he continued his education at Tennessee State University, where he graduated with distinction in Chemistry.

During his graduate studies at the University of Rochester, Koontz conducted research on problems of neutron dosimetry, toxicology of uranium, plutonium, and fission products. Along with their instructors, the students in Koontz's class of health physicists developed the first guidelines and procedures to protect people from ionizing radiation.

== Career ==
At Atomics International, Koontz designed a pinhole gamma ray camera. He also developed techniques for measuring absolute thermal neutron flux using radioactive indium foils, and helped design and fabricate equipment to automate air and water sampling equipment and radiation activity measuring devices.

Koontz was involved in the Clinch River Breeder Reactor project, where he was responsible for Atomics International's contract on the design of the radioactive waste and sodium disposal system. The project was cancelled in 1983.
