= The St. Louis American =

Weekly newspaper aimed at the African-American community in St. Louis, Missouri

- Type: Weekly newspaper
- Founded: March 1928; 98 years ago
- Language: English
- City: St. Louis, Missouri
- Country: United States
- Website: www.stlamerican.com

The St. Louis American is a weekly newspaper serving the African-American community of St. Louis, Missouri. The first issue appeared in March 1928. In 1930, the newspaper started a "Buy Where You Can Work" campaign. Donald Suggs along with two other investors purchased majority shares in the newspaper in 1981, and in 1984 Suggs became the majority stockholder and publisher.

== History ==
St. Louis' only African American newspaper continuously published since 1928, and the longest continuously published weekly newspaper in the St. Louis area, The St. Louis American newspaper has emerged as the single largest weekly newspaper in the entire state of Missouri.

The St. Louis American was founded by Judge Nathan B. Young Jr and several African American businessmen, including Homer G. Phillips. At the time, the American was an eight-page "paid" tabloid, with a circulation of just over 2,000. In came Nathaniel Sweets less than a year later. Sweets helped keep the American alive for more than 45 years as an owner-publisher. Throughout the 1940s, 1950s, 1960s, and 1970s, the American continued to gain respect and readership, through its venerable editor Bennie G. Rodgers, who worked for the paper for more than 50 years, and is still known as the "dean of black journalism in St. Louis".

Current publisher Donald M. Suggs took the reins of The St. Louis American in the early 1980s. When Suggs took over the newspaper, it had a circulation of approximately 4,400. His first major change: the paper had to move from being a limited-circulation paid newspaper to a widely circulated free weekly newspaper to effectively and efficiently reach the rapidly growing (and more broadly dispersing) African American population in the St. Louis area.

== Awards ==
The St. Louis American has garnered more than 100 local, regional, and national awards for excellence in journalism, design, and commitment to the community, including being named 'Newspaper of the Year' by the Local Media Association in 2015. The American has been named the '#1 African-American Newspaper in the Nation' 12 times in recent years by the National Newspaper Publishers Association, including five straight years from 2012 to 2016; is a five-time recipient of Missouri Press Association's first place award for General Excellence; and, received the Missouri Gold Cup Award six times in the last decade. The newspaper's publisher, Donald M. Suggs was named 'Publisher of the Year' by the NNPA in 2016.

== See also ==
- St. Louis Argus
- St. Louis Beacon
- St. Louis Sentinel
- Suburban Journals

N. A. Sweets joined the St. Louis American staff as their first advertising manager in 1928. In 1933 Sweets bought out the remaining shareholders and became editor and publisher of the St. Louis American, which he remained until his retirement in 1981. His wife, Melba A Sweets, wrote a weekly column, "We're Tellin'", for more than thirty years.
