= Chick Finney =

American pianist, composer, and businessman

- Birth name: Joseph Finney
- Born: c. 1911; St. Louis, Missouri, U.S.
- Died: December 11, 1975 (aged 64)
- Genres: Jazz, big band
- Instruments: Piano

Joseph "Chick" Finney (c. 1911 – December 11, 1975) was an American jazz pianist, composer, and businessman.

== Early life ==
Finney was a native of St. Louis and attended Vashon High School. He became interested in piano after seeing Duke Ellington perform at the St. Louis Coliseum and later purchased sheet music to begin self-study. Finney also took lessons with J. Roy Terry, a professor of music.

== Career ==
Finney worked as a background pianist for the St. Louis Crackerjacks in 1933 and 1934. Tunes written by him were performed by Tuba Skinny and Hot Lips Page. Finney later started a public relations firm and was a columnist for the St. Louis Argus. He later produced a regional talent show called Stars of Tomorrow.
