= Citizen's Liberty League =

Political organisation in Missouri

The Citizen's Liberty League was a political organization established in Missouri to advance the interests of African Americans in the Republican Party. It addressed the policies of segregation, exclusion, and discrimination in the state. It was established in 1919 in Pythian Hall.

The league was founded by George L. Vaughn, Joseph E. Mitchell, Charles Turpin, and Homer G. Phillips to promote and endorse African American political candidates and worked to secure a share of appointed public offices for African Americans.

The group helped elect Walthall Moore to the Missouri General Assembly.

The group adopted a resolution at the Union Memorial Methodist Episcopal Church in St. Louis. It was presented into the record of the Missouri House of Representatives.

By the early 1930s, Vaughn had switched to the Democratic Party and advocated for others to do as well. Phillips was murdered in 1931.
