= U.S. Grant Tayes =

African American painter (1885–1972)

- Born: October 26, 1885; Warrensburg, Missouri, U.S.
- Died: June 15, 1972 (aged 86); Jefferson City, Missouri, U.S.
- Burial place: Longview Cemetery, Jefferson City, Missouri, U.S.
- Other names: Ulysses S. Grant Tayes, Ulysses Tayes
- Education: Lincoln University
- Occupations: Visual artist, barber, musician, writer, educator
- Years active: 1929–1950
- Known for: Painting, watercolor
- Spouse(s): Mary Aline Lane, Laura Alice Jackson, Lillian Lee
- Children: 1

Ulysses S. Grant Tayes (October 26, 1885 — June 15, 1972), commonly known as U.S. Grant Tayes, was an American painter and watercolorist, active in Missouri from the 1930s through 1950s. His artwork was centered around documenting his Black community in Missouri. He was a self-taught visual artist, who benefited from professional mentorship in his later life. Tayes also worked as a teacher, a barber, and a columnist.

== Early life and education ==
Ulysses S. Grant Tayes was born on October 26, 1885, in Warrensburg, Missouri into an African American family. He found inspiration during his childhood in Warrensburg where he saw local painters at work, including George Probst and Walter Hout.

He attended the historically black Lincoln University in Jefferson City, Missouri and received a B.S. degree in education in 1936. He married three times, to Mary Aline Lane, Laura Alice Jackson, and Lillian Lee; and had one daughter.

== Career ==
From 1929 until 1935, Tayes lived in St. Louis. The “Tayes Art Museum” was the informal name of his in St. Louis barbershop at 122 North Third Street; he would display his artwork there. He was a member of the St. Louis Society of Independent Artists. Tayes was also a musician and performed on the local St. Louis radio station in the 1930s; and was a columnist and wrote for the St. Louis Argus in the 1930s. While living in St. Louis, he was mentored by artists Frederick C. Alston and Edmund H. Wuerpel.

He moved to Jefferson City, Missouri in 1935, and remained there until 1950. Tayes worked as a barber out of his home at 528 Lafayette Street in Jefferson City; in an African American neighborhood's commercial district (during racial segregation) called "The Foot". His neighborhood "The Foot" was often the subject of his artwork, with works such as the Barber Shop (1947), and the Bar Scene. His neighbor was noted businessman, Duke Diggs. "The Foot" neighborhood of Jefferson City no longer exists, but it was unearthed during the Lafayette Street interchange construction in 2015.

Tayes died on June 15, 1972, in Jefferson City.

== Exhibitions ==
- 1929, "Exhibition of the Work of Negro Artists" group exhibition by the Urban League of St. Louis, St. Louis Public Library, St. Louis, Missouri
- 1930, "Exhibit of Fine Arts by American Negro Artists" group exhibition by Harmon Foundation
- 1932, "St. Louis Post-Dispatch Black and White Exhibition" by St. Louis Artists' Guild, St. Louis Post-Dispatch, St. Louis, Missouri
- 1933, "1933 Exhibition of the Work of Negro Artists", group exhibition by Harmon Foundation at the Art Centre, New York City, New York
- 1933, "5th Annual Art Exhibition for Negro Artists", group exhibition, St. Louis Public Library, St. Louis, Missouri; first prize winner
- 1939, "15th Annual Art Exhibition of Negro Artists in Oil and Water Colors", group exhibition, St. Louis Urban Art League, St. Louis Art Museum, St. Louis, Missouri
- 1944, "Exhibition of Paintings, Sculpture and Prints by Negro Artists", group exhibition by Atlanta University (now Clark Atlanta University), Atlanta, Georgia
- 1945, "Exhibition of Paintings, Sculpture and Prints by Negro Artists", group exhibition by Atlanta University (now Clark Atlanta University), Atlanta, Georgia
- 2019, "Selections from the Melvin Holmes Collection of African American Art Exhibition", group exhibition by the Melvin Holmes Collection of African American Art, Tyler Fine Art
