= St. Louis Sun =

Newspaper in Missouri, US

The St. Louis Sun was a daily newspaper based in St. Louis, Missouri, published by Ingersoll Publications. The Sun began publishing on September 25, 1989, and failed to compete successfully with the well-established St. Louis Post-Dispatch. Seven months after it started, the Sun ceased operations on April 25, 1990.

In 1984, Ingersoll Publications Company purchased the free weekly Suburban Journals of Greater St. Louis. In 1985, Ingersoll Publications Company chief executive Ralph Ingersoll II began planning to solidify his company's entrance into the St. Louis newspaper market. Ingersoll wanted to compete directly with the St. Louis Post-Dispatch, and the failure of the St. Louis Globe-Democrat in 1986 allowed him this opportunity. Ingersoll used high-risk junk bonds to raise millions of dollars to finance several newspaper acquisitions including the $20 million his company needed to launch the St. Louis Sun as a tabloid-style paper.

In 1988, Ingersoll Publications purchased The Alton Telegraph and Mississippi Valley Offset, where the paper would be printed. Ingersoll Publications Company announced its Post-Dispatch competitor in March 1989. The tabloid newspaper was modeled after other papers such as the Rocky Mountain News and Barron's. The Sun began publishing on September 25, 1989, with Ingersoll as editor-in-chief. The paper was the first American metropolitan daily since The Washington Times was published in 1982. For the first three months of 1990, the newspaper claimed sales averaging over 100,000 a day. The Sun earned much local notoriety for a full-tabloid-page headline that read "He Bit Hers, She Sued His", which had to do with a lawsuit by a woman against a man who bit her buttocks. Growth of the circulation of the Sun nonetheless fell short of the company's expectations in the critical month of April. The paper's business strategy backfired, cannibalizing ad revenues at its sister publication, the Suburban Journals. Ingersoll announced the newspaper's closure on April 25, 1990, and the newspaper's last edition was published on that date.

== See also ==
- St. Louis Beacon
- St. Louis Globe-Democrat
