= Walthall M. Moore =

American politician (1886–1960)

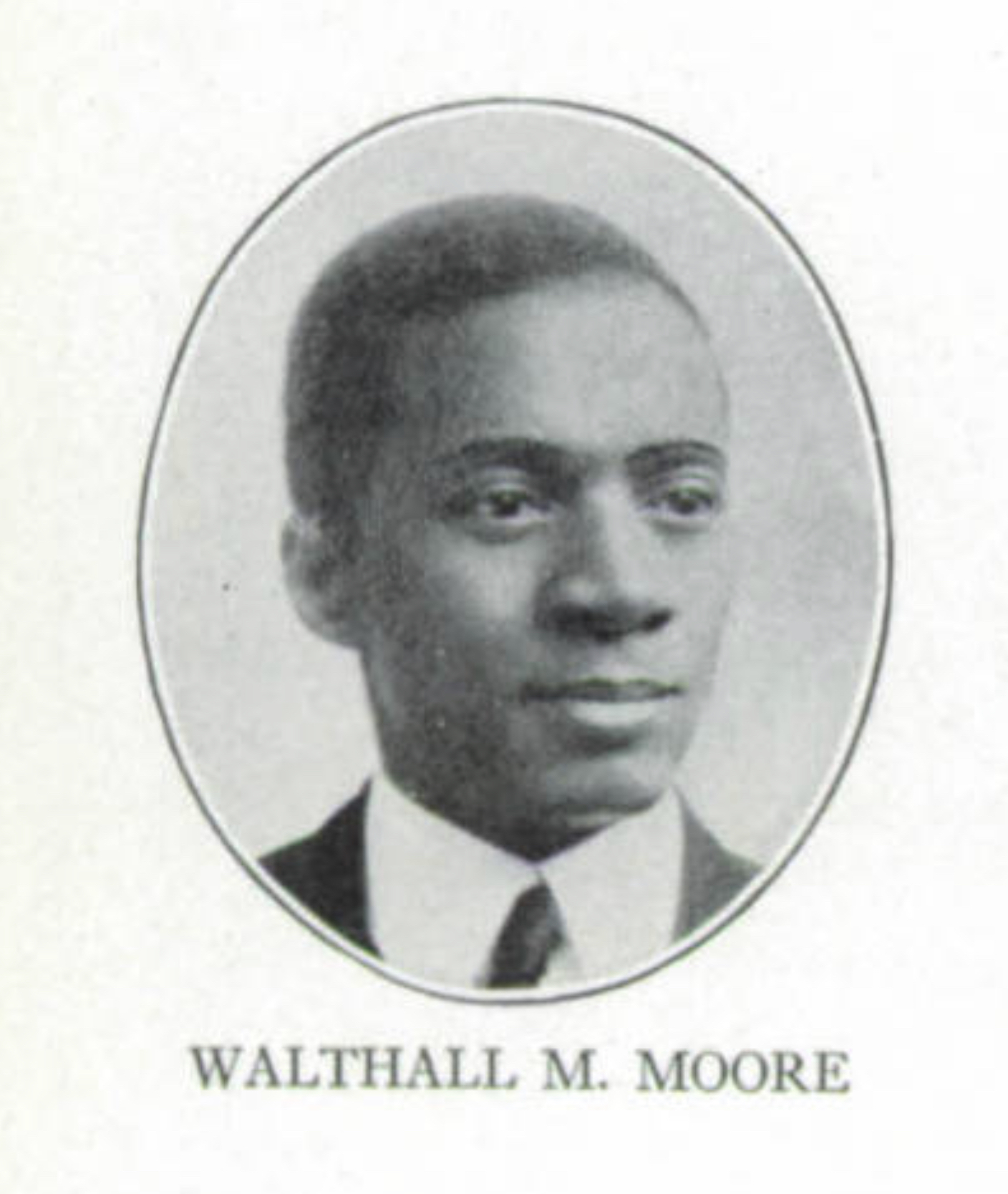

Member of the Missouri House of Representatives from St. Louis City's 3rd district
- In office 1921–1923
- In office 1925–1931

Personal details
- Born: May 1, 1886 Marion, Alabama, U.S.
- Died: April 8, 1960 (aged 73) St. Louis, Missouri, U.S.
- Party: Republican
- Spouse: F. A. Ferguson
- Education: Howard University
- Occupation: politician, postal clerk

Walthall M. Moore, Sr. (May 1, 1886 – April 8, 1960) was an American politician from Alabama who represented St. Louis in the Missouri House of Representatives. He was the first African American to serve in the Missouri state legislature. Moore was a member of the 51st, 53rd, 54th, and 55th General Assemblies. On December 29, 1911, he married Miss F. A. Ferguson in Marion, Indiana.

In 1919, a group of African American men organized the Citizen's Liberty League to help elect African Americans to political office and encourage the appointment of African Americans to public offices. It was an organization associated with the Republican Party seeking support from the party. It helped elect Moore. He was returned to the Missouri House of Representatives in the 1924 general election as one of four legislators elected from St. Louis City's 3rd district.

Moore represented a constituency where three-quarters of voters were white. He is also known for helping to upgrade and change the name of Lincoln Institute to Lincoln University, a school founded in 1866 by veterans of the United States Colored Troops. Moore was a delegate to the 1928 Republican National Convention from Missouri. Until Missouri's capital Jefferson City passed a public accommodations law in the late 1960s, African-American legislators were forced to stay either in private homes or in a dormitory at Lincoln University.

== See also ==
- List of African-American officeholders (1900–1959)
