= St. Louis Argus =

Former American newspaper

- Type: Weekly newspaper
- Founder(s): Joseph Everett Mitchell; William Mitchell.
- Publisher: Talibdin "TD" El-Amin
- Managing editor: Geoffrey Conners
- Founded: 1912
- Language: English
- City: St. Louis, Missouri
- Website: stlargusnews.com

St. Louis Argus is an African-American-oriented weekly newspaper founded in 1912 by brothers Joseph Everett Mitchell and William Mitchell. Nannie Mitchell, William's wife, helped found the paper but worked uncredited for many years, becoming president decades later. The Argus began as a newsletter for an insurance company named Western Union Relief Association. The Argus is the oldest continuous black business in St. Louis, Missouri.

== History ==
The name, Argus, refers to Argus Panoptes – a creature from Greek mythology with a hundred eyes that never closed at the same time. The newspaper was to be a never-sleeping crusader. It watched the goings-on in the African-American community and published the stories that would also help the influx of southern blacks who were pouring into St. Louis deal with the "vagaries" of northern segregation.

One primary goal of the St. Louis Argus was to organize the African-American community for political action. The editors of the St. Louis Argus promised its readers that it would be moderate, fair, and fearless in its journalistic efforts. Although the paper was closely aligned with the Republican Party and ran advertisements from the Central Committee, Mitchell wrote editorials challenging party politics. By 1925, when the Central Committee would not support Black candidates, the paper no longer claimed allegiance to any political party.

City editors included Herbert T. Meadows (1912–1948), Richard A. Jackson, Steven Korris (1979–1981). Other editors included F.F. Martyn (1912–1915), Phillip H. Murray (1915–1917), William Harold King, Mary Harmon-Ferguson, Minnie Ross, Otis Thompson,

The newspaper championed better schools, educational opportunities, and full civil rights for blacks. U.S. Grant Tayes served as a columnist for the newspaper in the 1930s, with the column Oh, Tempore!. Chick Finney wrote a column covering Jazz and Blues musicians. Community leader Frank Lunsford Williams had a weekly column. Herman Dreer wrote weekly Black history articles from the mid-1960s to early 1970s.

The Argus was one of the first papers to give eye-witness reports of the 1917 East St. Louis massacre. The Friday, July 6, 1917 edition was entirely dedicated to the race riot, and coverage continued for weeks to address accusations against the victims in other papers as well as the ongoing violence against the Black community and efforts of the NAACP.

The Argus earned the coveted Russwurm award, named for John Brown Russwurm, one of the founders of the first black newspaper, Freedom's Journal, which launched in 1827.

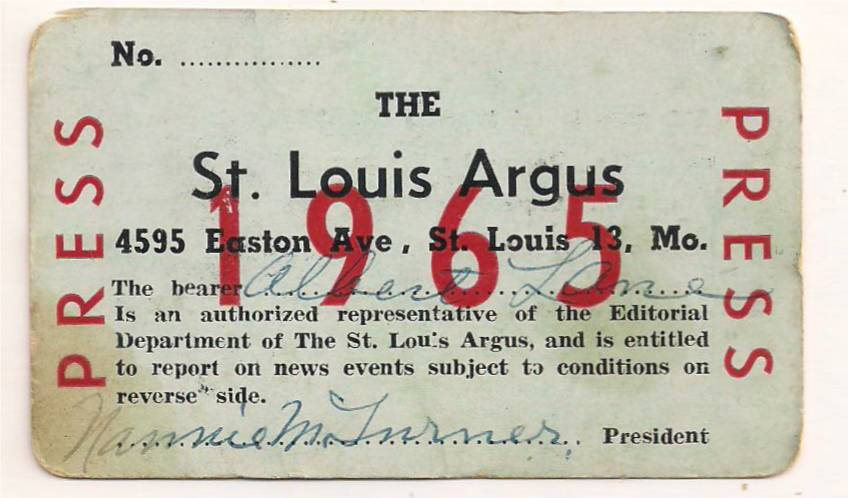
Press card

== 21st century ==
In 2003, Eugene Mitchell, grandson of William and Nannie Mitchell, sold the paper to Eddie Hasan. The paper had suffered almost two decades of decline, and Hasan hired Antonio French and George Jackson to modernize operations.

In 2008, The St. Louis American and other news sources reported donations to the paper from Citizens for a Better St. Louis, a group associated with mayor Francis Slay, and accused the newspaper of giving favorable coverage in return. Following Hasan's conviction on tax evasion, it was announced that the paper would reduce publication frequency in 2009. Alvin Reid was announced as editor in 2009.

Hasan's son-in-law and former Missouri legislator Talibdin El-Amin is the publisher and executive editor. In 2024, a grant from the Press Forward project was paused due to the lack of original reporting at the time of application.
