= St. Louis Magazine =

American monthly magazine

- Cover of August 2008 issue
- Editor: Jarrett Medlin
- Former editors: Harper Barnes, Jeannette Batz Cooperman, Steve Friedman, Stephen Schenkenberg
- Categories: cuisine, lifestyle, local history
- Frequency: monthly
- Publisher: Ray Hartmann, St. Louis Magazine, LLC
- Total circulation (2017): 45,405
- First issue: 1969
- Company: SLM Media Group
- Country: USA
- Based in: St. Louis, Missouri
- Language: English
- Website: www.stlmag.com
- ISSN: 0272-1279
- OCLC: 5297869

St. Louis Magazine is a monthly periodical published in St. Louis, Missouri, that covers local history, cuisine, and lifestyles. Founded in 1969 as Replay, it was renamed The St. Louisan, then given its current title in 1977.

== History ==
The magazine started under the name Replay in 1969. Its president and publisher was Steve Apted, and its editor was Doris Lieberman. The home office was in the basement of the Cheshire Inn, a local hotel.

It was quickly renamed The St. Louisan OCLC 6462976, then in 1977 renamed to its current title of St. Louis Magazine OCLC 5130754.

In 1990, it was acquired by the St. Louis Business Journal. In 1994, it was acquired by Hartmann Publishing, the owner of The Riverfront Times. Its editor for a time was the author Harper Barnes, who left in 2001 to concentrate on writing books, though he remained as senior writer and movie columnist. In 1998, Hartmann Publishing sold The Riverfront Times to New Times Media and retained St. Louis Magazine.
