= Riverfront Times =

Free progressive weekly newspaper in St. Louis, Missouri

- The June 26, 2016 edition of the Riverfront Times
- Type: Alternative weekly
- Format: Tabloid
- Owner: Big Lou Holdings LLC
- Editor: Sarah Fenske (2015–2019), Doyle Murphy (2019–February 2022), Rosalind Early (March 2022-2024)
- Founded: 1977; 49 years ago
- Headquarters: St. Louis, Missouri, U.S.
- Circulation: 81,276 weekly
- Website: riverfronttimes.com

The Riverfront Times (RFT) was a free progressive weekly newspaper in St. Louis, Missouri, that consisted of local politics, music, arts, and dining news in the print edition, and daily updates to blogs and photo galleries on its website. As of June 2008, the Riverfront Times had an AAM-audited weekly circulation of 81,276 copies. A 2024 sale immediately ended print distribution and resulted in the layoffs of all staff. The only remaining element of the publication is a website which primarily features aggregated content and OnlyFans promotions.

== History ==
The paper was founded in 1977 by Ray Hartmann who, along with co-owner Mark Vittert, sold the newspaper in 1998 to New Times Media (later known, following a 2006 merger, as Village Voice Media). In September 2012, Village Voice Media executives Scott Tobias, Christine Brennan and Jeff Mars agreed to purchase Village Voice Media's papers and associated web properties from its founders and formed Voice Media Group. In 2015, Euclid Media Group acquired the Times from Voice Media Group.

The paper received more than three dozen awards from the Missouri Press Association, along with the group's Gold Cup. The paper and website featured a weekly syndicated column by relationship and sex advice writer Dan Savage. In the past, the paper carried Chuck Sheppard's News of the Weird column. Former journalists that wrote for the paper include Suzanne Langlois, who won the 1994 Con Lee Kelliher award for distinguished achievement.

In June 2019, editor-in-chief Sarah Fenske announced her departure after being selected to host St. Louis on the Air on St. Louis Public Radio. News editor Doyle Murphy was selected as interim editor-in-chief. Murphy served as editor-in-chief until he announced in the February 9, 2022, edition that he would be leaving the paper to work for St. Louis Public Radio. Ben Westhoff, the executive editor of Euclid Media Group, served as interim editor-in-chief following Murphy's resignation, but announced on February 24, 2022, that Rosalind Early, who was then serving as deputy managing editor for Washington Magazine at Washington University in St. Louis, would be the paper's next editor in chief, starting in March.

In August 2023, Euclid Media Group dissolved and the newspaper was sold to Chris Keating, operating under the name Big Lou Holdings LLC. The paper was sold again in May 2024 to an unnamed buyer and all staff were laid off. The buyers were revealed to be individuals who promote OnlyFans content creators under the LLCs Ready Set Cam and FanFox registered in Texas.

Bound print backfiles of the Riverfront Times spanning December 1977 to 2007 were donated to Washington University in St. Louis Special Collections, and public librarians Jaclyn Crow and Joshua Lawrence archived digital content from the publication's last decade on a Google Sites page. Crow and Lawrence continued to update the online database, adding articles found with the Wayback Machine and redesigning the site to make it more user friendly.

== See also ==
- Wm. Stage, RFT columnist
- St. Louis Beacon
- Suburban Journals
- St. Louis Post-Dispatch
