= Juanita Jane Saddler =

- Born: 1892; Guthrie, Oklahoma
- Died: 1970 (aged 77–78); New York, New York
- Education: Fisk University; Columbia University
- Occupations: Educator, Activist

Juanita Jane Saddler (1892-1970) had a long involvement with the Young Women's Christian Association (YWCA) and was active in working to integrate that institution. She also served for a time as dean of women at Fisk University.

== Biography ==
Saddler was born in 1892 in Guthrie, Oklahoma. She attended Fisk University, graduating in 1915.

She joined the staff of the Young Women's Christian Organization (YWCA) in 1920. There she worked in the student division and in 1933 she authored "Statement Made to the Student Staff Regarding Interracial Education". The ideas contained in that statement and others by Saddler influenced the 1946 YWCA integration charter.

In 1933 Saddler became dean of women at Fisk University working with Mary McLeod Bethune from 1935 to 1936.

In 1935 she earned her master's degree from Teachers College, Columbia University

During the Franklin D. Roosevelt administration Saddler moved to Washington, D.C. to work on integrating welfare programs for young people. She moved to the Boston area in the 1950s where she was active with the YWCA, and the Community Relations Committee. In the 1960s Saddler moved to New York City where she was a member of the Riverside Church and became involved with Church Women United

She died in 1970 in New York.
