= Juliette Derricotte =

American educator and activist (1897–1931)

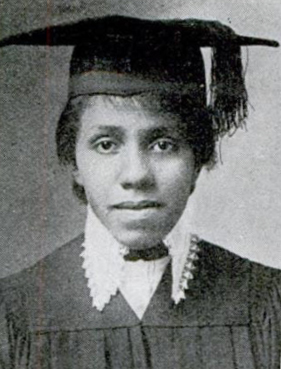
- Juliette Derricotte, graduation, 1918
- Born: April 1, 1897; Athens, Georgia, US
- Died: November 7, 1931 (aged 34); Chattanooga, Tennessee, US
- Education: Talladega College; Columbia University
- Occupations: Educator; Dean of Women, Fisk University

Juliette Derricotte (April 1, 1897 – November 7, 1931) was an American educationist and political activist. At the time of her death, she was the Dean of Women at Fisk University.

Her death, after being turned away from a white-only hospital following a car accident in Chattanooga, Tennessee, sparked outrage in the African-American community.

== Early life ==
Juliette Derricotte was born in Athens, Georgia, Her parents, Isaac and Laura, were former slaves, but at the time of her birth they worked as cobbler and a seamstress. As a child she wanted to attend the Lucy Cobb Institute in Athens but at that time the school was segregated and did not accept Black girls. This denial helped shape Derricotte's perception of the world and her desire to change people's racial prejudices.

== Education and career ==
Derricotte's public speaking earned her a scholarship to attend Talladega College. After graduating in 1918, she enrolled at the Young Women's Christian Association (YWCA) Training School. She became the YWCA secretary of the National Student Council, where her responsibilities included visiting colleges, planning conferences, and fostering ideas and leadership. She is credited with re-establishing the council's ideology, helping it become more balanced, open, and interracial.

In 1924, she became a member of the World Student Christian Federation and began traveling the world as a delegate representing American colleges. In 1927, she received a master's degree in religious education from Columbia University. Her travels included a seven-week trip to Mysore, India starting in December, 1928 to attend the World Student Christian Conference. Seeing British colonialism in India, she drew parallels with the subjugation of African Americans in the United States, as a growing network of African American and Indian activists were doing at that time. She wrote about the insights and inspiration she gained from the trip in the African American magazine, The Crisis, including the joy of seeing “friends working, thinking, playing, living together in the finest sort of fellowship.”.

Derricotte resigned from her YWCA position in 1929 to become Dean of Women at Fisk University in Nashville, Tennessee. She also became the first female trustee of Talladega College.

Derricotte was an active member of the Delta Sigma Theta sorority and affiliated with its first graduate chapter in New York City. After her death, the sorority established a scholarship fund in her honor, awarded to sorority members employed in the social work field.

== Death ==
In 1931, Derricotte died after a traffic accident outside of Dalton, Georgia. The car she was riding in, which was driven by another student, collided with the car of a white couple. Both Derricotte and the student were seriously injured. They received emergency treatment from white doctors but were refused admittance to the local hospital because they were black. They were moved to a local woman's house, where both died. This triggered national outrage and several investigations, including one involving the National Association for the Advancement of Colored People.

== Legacy ==
Sue Bailey Thurman was inspired by Derricotte's ideas and established the Juliette Derricotte Scholarship. The scholarship enabled African-American undergraduate women with high academic achievements to study and travel abroad. One of the recipients was Margaret Bush Wilson, who revived the scholarship decades later.
