= St. Louis Beacon =

Online-only news site

Masthead of the St. Louis Beacon

The St. Louis Beacon was an online-only news site in the greater St. Louis area. Several of the site's founders include former reporters and editors from the St. Louis Post-Dispatch. Funded largely by outside donations, the Beacon had 15 paid staffers and dozens of outside contributors.

Beacon coverage trended toward public issues rather than news events. As an example, the St. Louis Journalism Review points to the Beacon's lack of coverage of St. Louis Cardinals' player Albert Pujols' calf injury in June 2008. By contrast, the site, in conjunction with local public television station KETC, reported heavily on the local effects of the mortgage crisis.

The Beacon was organized in 2007, and launched online in March 2008. At that time it was called the St. Louis Platform. In April 2008, its name was changed to the St. Louis Beacon.

Effective December 10, 2013, the St. Louis Beacon merged with St. Louis Public Radio. The Beacon home page refers readers to the St. Louis Public Radio News web site for staff members' current work, indicating the end of news publishing as the St. Louis Beacon. It was stated that the St. Louis Beacon site will remain online, to provide archive access, until the archive material becomes available elsewhere.

== See also ==
- St. Louis Globe-Democrat
- St. Louis Sun
