= Washington University in St. Louis =

Private research university in Missouri, US

- Former names: Eliot Seminary (1853–1854); Washington Institute (1854–1856); Washington University (1856–1976)
- Motto: Per veritatem vis (Latin)
- Motto in English: "Strength through truth"
- Type: Private research university
- Established: February 22, 1853; 173 years ago
- Accreditation: HLC
- Academic affiliations: AAU; COFHE; MISA; NAICU; ORAU; URA; Space-grant
- Endowment: $17.7 billion (2026)
- Chancellor: Andrew D. Martin
- Provost: Mark D. West
- Faculty: 4,744 (2025)
- Students: 15,952 (2025)
- Undergraduates: 8,164 (2025)
- Postgraduates: 6,922 (2025)
- Location: St. Louis postal address, Missouri, United States; 38.648°N 90.305°W
- Campus: 355 acres (1.44 km^{2}); Suburban
- Newspaper: Student Life
- Colors: Red and green
- Nickname: Bears
- Sporting affiliations: NCAA Division III – UAA; CCIW
- Mascot: Forest the bear
- Website: washu.edu

Washington University in St. Louis (WashU) is a private research university in the St. Louis metropolitan area, Missouri, United States. Founded in 1853 by a group of civic leaders and named for the first U.S. president George Washington, the university spans 355 acres across its Danforth and Medical campuses. It comprises 10 schools and offers more than 150 undergraduate, 80 master's and professional, and 50 doctoral degree programs. As of 2024, Washington University enrolled 16,399 students representing all 50 U.S. states and more than 110 countries.

Established due to a concern of a lack of institutions of higher learning in the Midwest, the university held its first classes in 1854 in downtown St. Louis. In 1905, Washington University relocated to a new campus northwest of Forest Park, which allowed for expansion and new facilities to support its growing academic programs and student body. Construction of the first building, Busch Hall, began in 1900, followed by Brookings Hall, Ridgley, and Cupples. These buildings were not occupied until 1905 in order to accommodate the 1904 Summer Olympics and St. Louis World's Fair. By 1964, more than two-thirds of incoming students came from outside the St. Louis area. In 2021, the university adopted a need-blind undergraduate-admissions policy.

Washington University joined the Association of American Universities in 1923. The university received over 32,750 applications for the Class of 2028 and admitted 12 percent. It supports more than 400 undergraduate student organizations. The university's athletic teams, the Washington University Bears, compete in NCAA Division III as founding members of the University Athletic Association and as a member of the College Conference of Illinois and Wisconsin. Its mascot is a bear named Forest, and its official colors are red and green. The Bears have won 26 NCAA Division III championships.

Governance of the university is overseen by a board of trustees, and as of 2025, the university is led by Chancellor Andrew D. Martin and Provost Mark D. West. The university's endowment of $12.0 billion is among the fifteen largest in the United States. The university's motto is Per veritatem vis, which translates to "Strength through truth". It is accredited by the Higher Learning Commission. Washington University has been the venue for four presidential debates and one vice-presidential debate.

As of 2024, 26 Nobel laureates, 11 Pulitzer Prize winners, 4 United States poets laureate, and 6 MacArthur Fellows have been affiliated with the university as faculty or alumni. A top producer of Fulbright scholars, Washington University alumni also include 18 university presidents, 21 members of the United States Congress, and 30 Rhodes Scholars.

== History ==
=== 19th century ===
==== Founding and early years ====
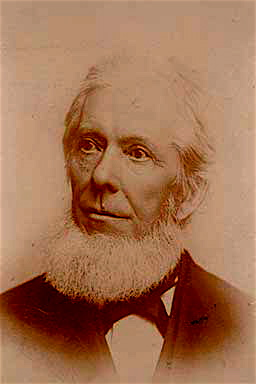
William Greenleaf Eliot, first president of the board of trustees

Washington University was founded in 1853 by 17 St. Louis business, religious, and political leaders concerned by the lack of institutions of higher learning in the Midwest. State Senator Wayman Crow and Unitarian minister William Greenleaf Eliot led the effort. Crow secured the university charter, and Eliot was named president of the board of trustees, with Crow serving as vice president. Joseph Gibson Hoyt became the university's inaugural chancellor.

Unlike most American institutions, Washington University initially lacked a financial endowment and did not have the backing of a religious organization, wealthy patron, or government support.

Originally called Eliot Seminary, the name faced opposition from Eliot himself, who favored a nonsectarian identity for the institution. To address this, Eliot appointed a subcommittee consisting of himself and Samuel Treat to recommend a new name. The subcommittee proposed Washington Institute, in honor of George Washington, the nation's first president, as the charter had been granted on his birthday, February 22. The board unanimously approved the proposal. In 1856, the board officially amended the name to Washington University.

==== Growth and expansion ====
Chartered as a university, it initially functioned primarily as a night school and did not have buildings, faculty, or established course offerings. Classes began on October 22, 1854, in the Benton Schoolhouse, a facility loaned by the public school board, which also covered utility costs and installed gas lighting for evening instruction. Tuition was offered free of charge. By the end of the first year, 270 students had enrolled, with ages ranging from 8 years old to 46 years old. The university hired four teachers from the public school system, two of whom later became the university's first full-time faculty members. In 1856, the university completed the first building on the three-acre site that it had purchased on Seventeenth Street and Washington Avenue. Washington University remained located in downtown St. Louis for its first fifty years.

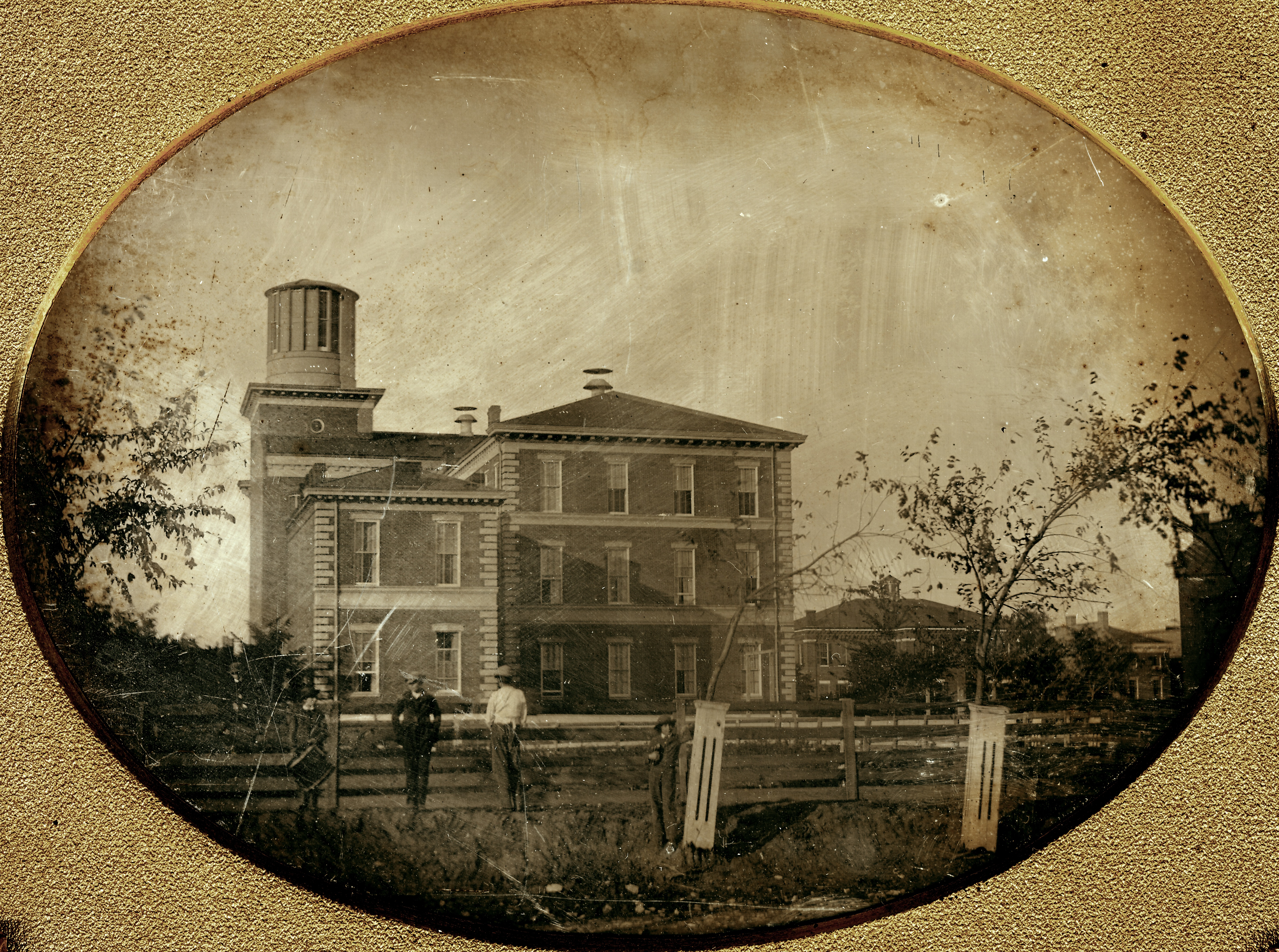
Smith Academy (1856)

In 1856, Eliot and other trustees established a preparatory academic department for boys. Admission was granted to boys aged ten and older who passed an exam in reading, writing, geography, and basic arithmetic. In 1859, a preparatory female department was established. In recognition of Eliot's leadership, the university insisted on naming it the Mary Institute, in honor of his daughter. In 1879, the academic department for boys was named Smith Academy.

Washington University's law school (originally known as The St. Louis Law School) was the first undergraduate division of the university to admit women. In 1869, Lemma Barkeloo and Phoebe Couzins enrolled. Barkeloo passed the Missouri bar exam in her first year and did not complete the program, while Couzins earned her LL.B. in 1871. However, it wasn't until 1886 that women were regularly admitted again to the law school.

In 1871, Eliot was named the third chancellor of Washington University.

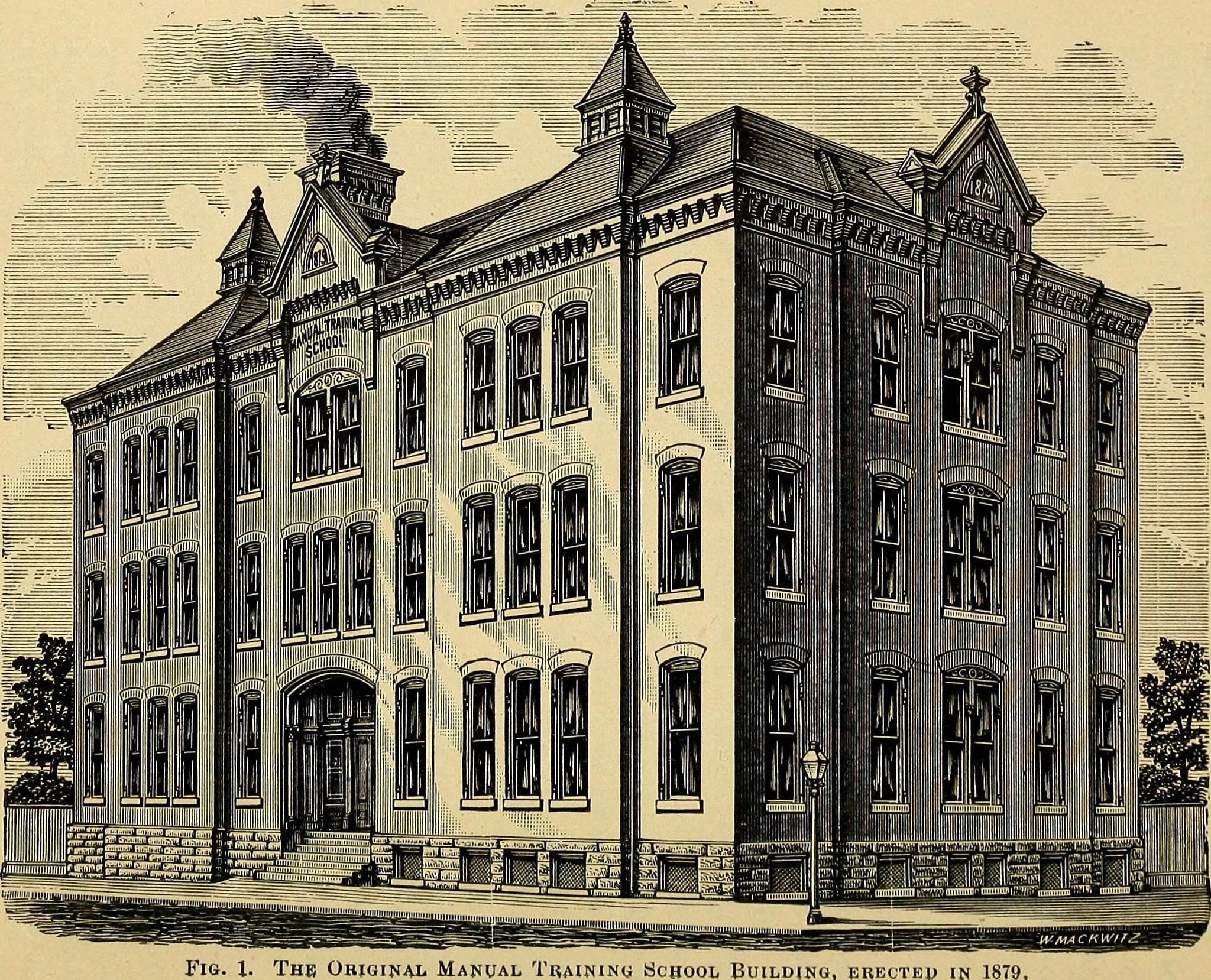
Washington University Manual Training School (1906)

In 1879, the St. Louis Manual Training School of Washington University became the first manual training school established in the United States. Students' time was divided equally between manual training and schoolwork.

Facing declining enrollment in the 1870s, the university sought to strengthen ties with local preparatory schools, and, by 1880, graduates from select high schools could enter by certificate rather than examination. The college also introduced the Bachelor of Philosophy (Ph.B) degree as a more flexible alternative to the traditional Bachelor of Arts, with the Ph.B. placing greater emphasis on science, history, and English. Lectures and written exams replaced traditional oral recitations, and completing a senior thesis became a requirement for graduation for the Ph.B degree. Admitting women had a greater impact on enrollment than any academic reforms. After a unanimous faculty vote, the first woman enrolled in the undergraduate college in 1870; by the 1890s, women were the main drivers of the college's enrollment growth.

During Eliot's chancellorship, student organizations at Washington University rose and fell quickly due to a lack of institutional support. Athletics were especially unstable, with clubs like baseball and rowing repeatedly forming and disbanding, though individual sports gained steadier traction with the building of gyms and hiring of instructors. A major shift occurred in 1890 when the Washington University Athletic Association (established in 1884) embraced intercollegiate football.

In 1890, the number of prescribed courses for the Bachelor of Arts degree was 40 of 45. By the end of 1892, Washington University had reduced the number of prescribed courses to 8 out of 38. This shift in policy also led to the abolition of alternative degrees like the Ph.B. and contributed to the creation of many new courses.

Washington University's decision to purchase a tract of land for a new campus was driven by the rapid growth of St. Louis and the decreasing availability of suitable locations. The land was acquired for $185,000 (equivalent to $6,629,000 in 2025), with financing arranged through a loan and the sale of university stock, backed by private guarantees. The university then enlisted Olmsted, Olmsted & Eliot to design the campus, beginning with two landscape plans in 1895 and marking the beginning of the architects' broader influence. In 1897, the university formally announced plans in its catalog to move the Undergraduate Department to a new site northwest of Forest Park. Olmsted's praise of the site led the board to agree to buy the land without conditions. Olmsted also recommended acquiring additional land along Skinker Boulevard, which was completed in 1899 with help from Robert Brookings, and advised that future construction emphasize aesthetics. Their proposals included holding an architectural competition and grouping buildings in quadrangles, with the main building facing east from the ridge.

==== Medical College affiliation ====
In 1890, the St. Louis Medical College proposed establishing a physiological laboratory in partnership with Washington University. Although the university initially declined, the medical college renewed its efforts to affiliate. A joint committee formed in early 1891, and by April, the college formally became the "Medical Department of Washington University".

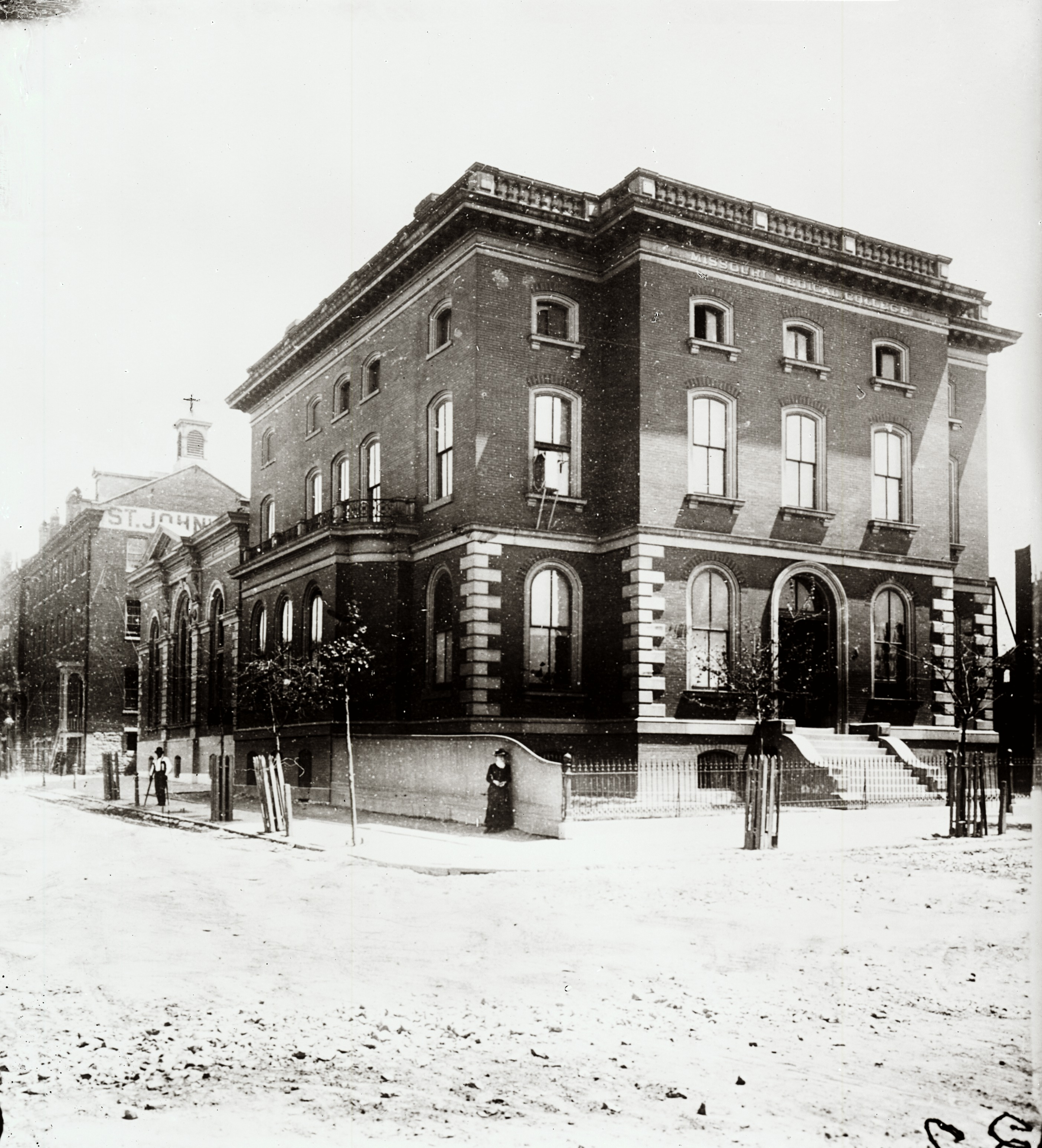
Missouri Medical College, established in 1840, affiliated with Washington University in 1899.

In 1892, the Missouri Dental College, with a curriculum closely aligned with the St. Louis Medical College, also affiliated with Washington University.

In 1899, the Missouri Medical College, established in 1840 as the oldest medical school west of the Mississippi in conjunction with Kemper College, merged with the St. Louis Medical College. Historian Ralph E. Morrow later wrote that this affiliation completed the foundation of Washington University's health programs. The merger doubled medical school enrollment. It also provided greater access to hospital beds for clinical work and expanded physical facilities, including the conversion of a Missouri Medical College building into Washington University's first hospital.

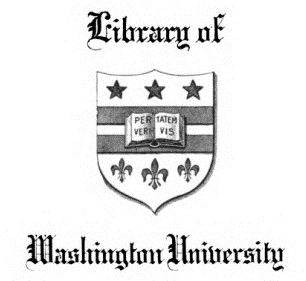
Washington University seal bookplate

==== University seal ====
In 1896, Holmes Smith, professor of Drawing and History of Art, designed what became the basis for the university seal. The seal is made up of elements from the Washington family coat of arms, an open book representing a university, and the symbol of Louis IX, after whom the city is named. In 1915, the university adopted its motto, Per veritatem vis, which translates to "Strength through truth".

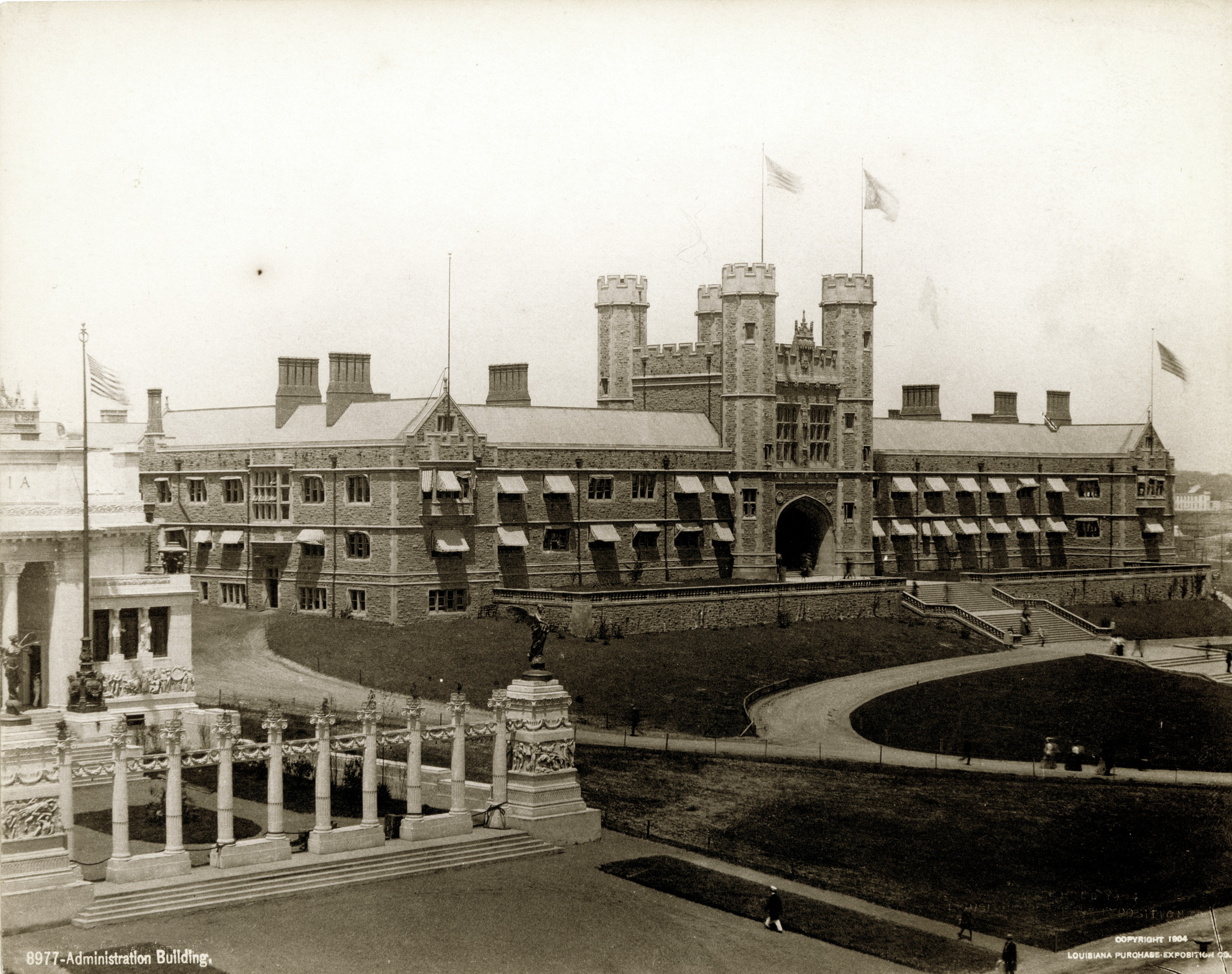
Brookings Hall during the 1904 World's Fair

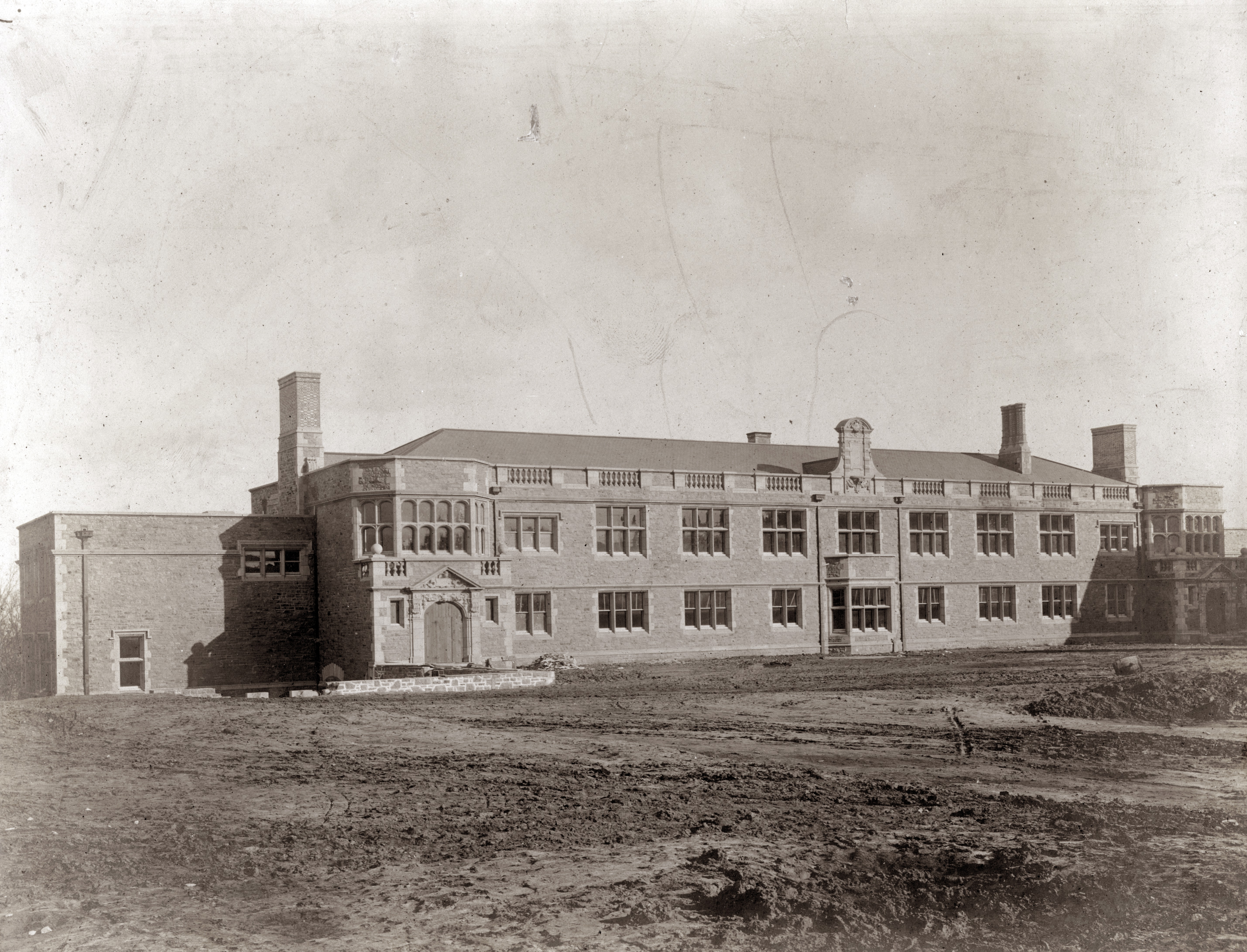
Cupples Hall on the grounds of the 1904 World's Fair

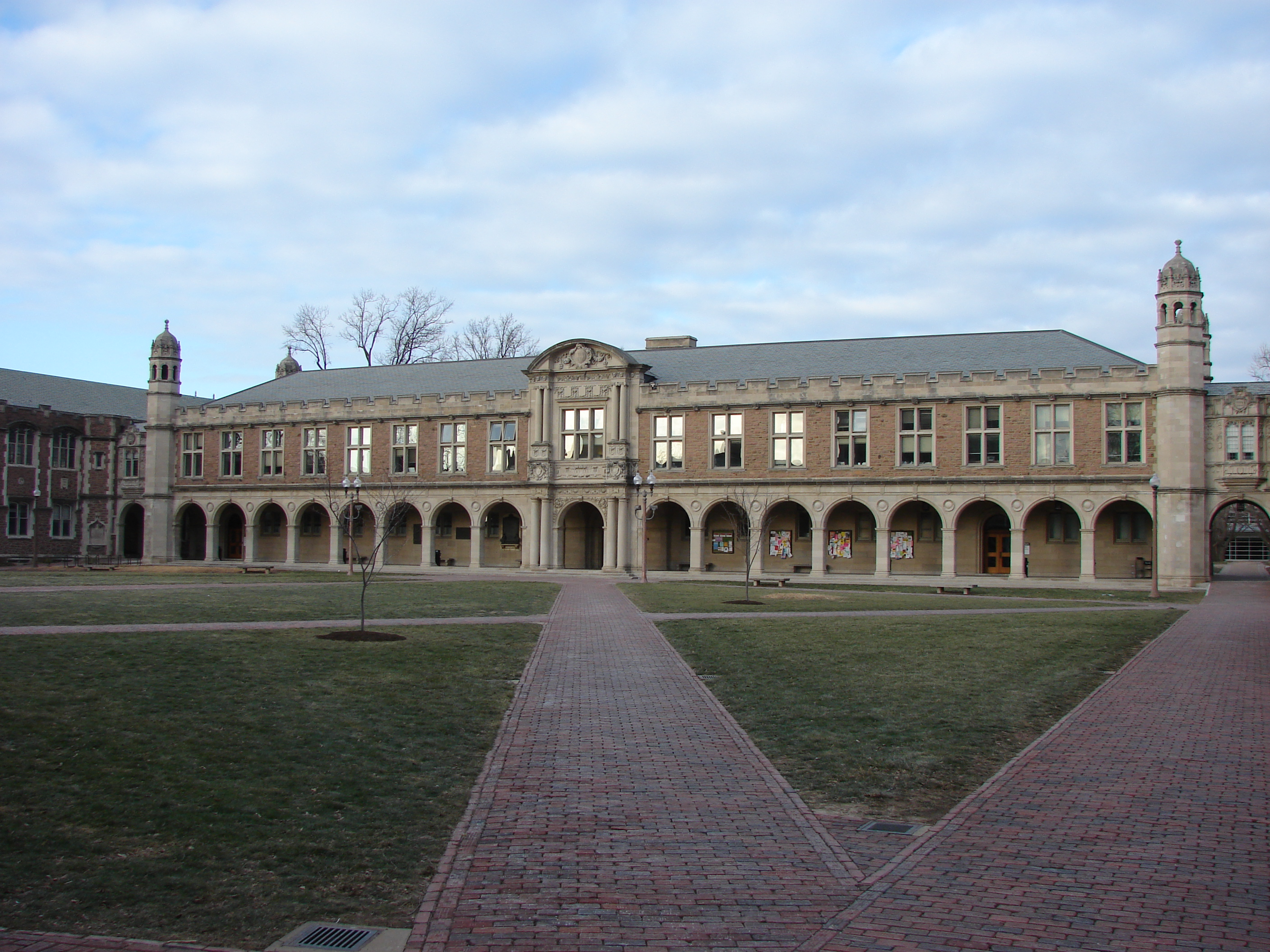
Ridgley Hall in 2006, built during the 1900s

=== 20th century ===
==== Campus building and academic foundation ====
The cornerstone of the first building on its new Hilltop Campus, Busch Hall was laid on October 20, 1900. Construction of additional buildings, including Brookings Hall, Ridgley, and Cupples began shortly thereafter. Washington University postponed occupying these buildings until 1905 to accommodate the 1904 World's Fair and the 1904 Summer Olympics. Robert S. Brookings, president of the board, leased the first five University buildings to the Fair. The $750,000 (equivalent to $26,900,000 in 2025) generated from the lease was then used to fund the construction of four additional buildings, which were also used by the Fair.

By 1905, the number of course offerings in the college had tripled. Four years later, the college implemented curricular changes that included a distribution requirement and a limit on how much concentration was allowed in a single field of study.

The School of Medicine formalized partnerships with Barnes Hospital in 1911 and St. Louis Children's Hospital in 1912. These agreements required hospital staffs to consist entirely of university faculty, while granting the university access to patients for clinical instruction and research. In return, Washington University pledged to construct and maintain modern medical facilities and laboratories adjacent to the hospitals. In 1915, the university completed a new medical complex on Kingshighway Boulevard. Three years later, Aphrodite Jannopoulo, Carol Skinner Cole, and Faye Cashatt became the first women to enroll as medical students.

In 1922, Arthur Holly Compton, head of the Department of Physics, conducted a series of experiments in the basement of Eads Hall that demonstrated the particle concept of electromagnetic radiation. Compton's discovery, known as the "Compton Effect," earned him the Nobel Prize in Physics in 1927.

In 1923, Washington University became a member of the Association of American Universities.

==== Desegregation and Social Change ====
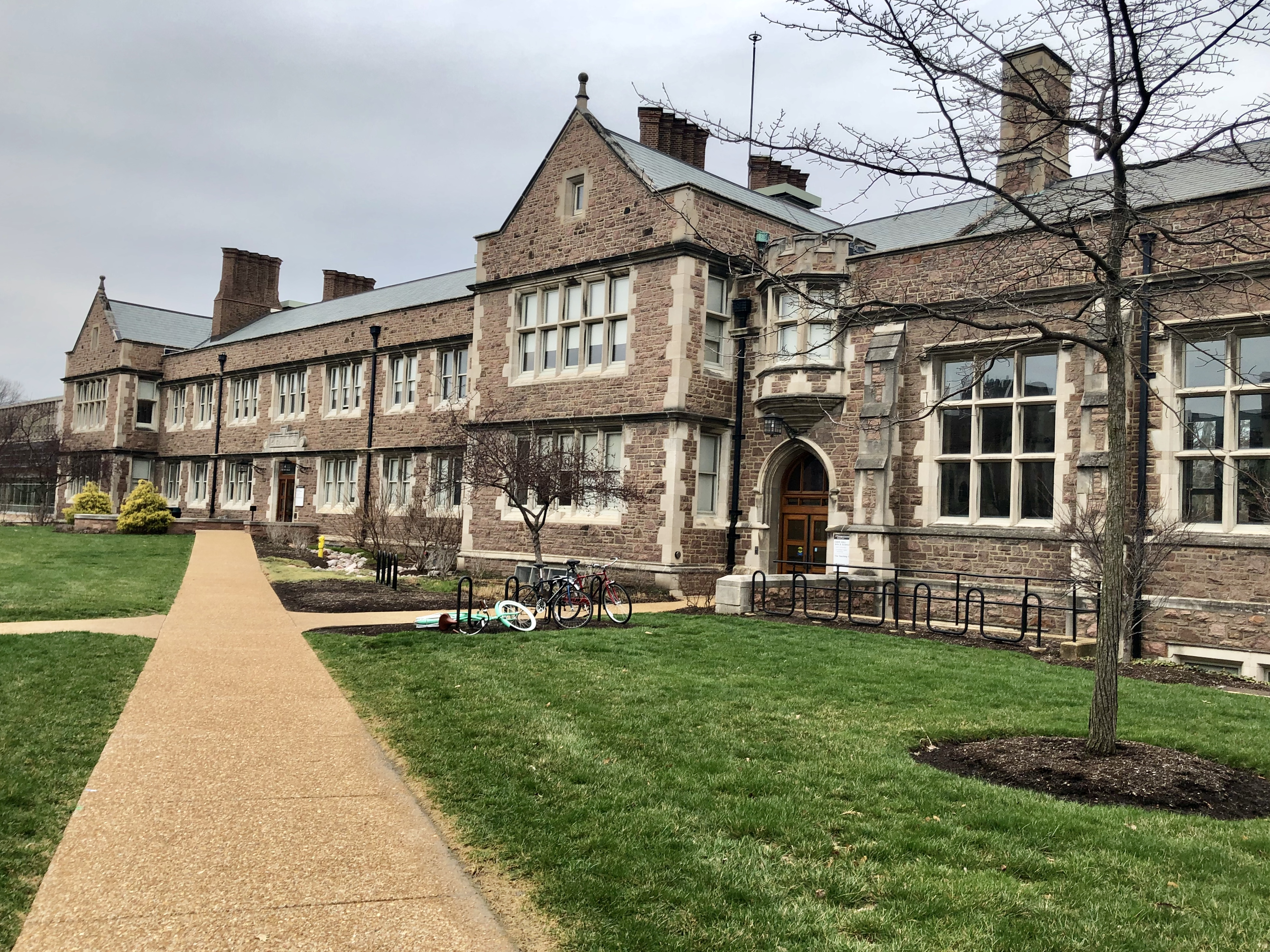
Eads Hall in 2019, where Arthur Holly Compton conducted experiments in the 1920s

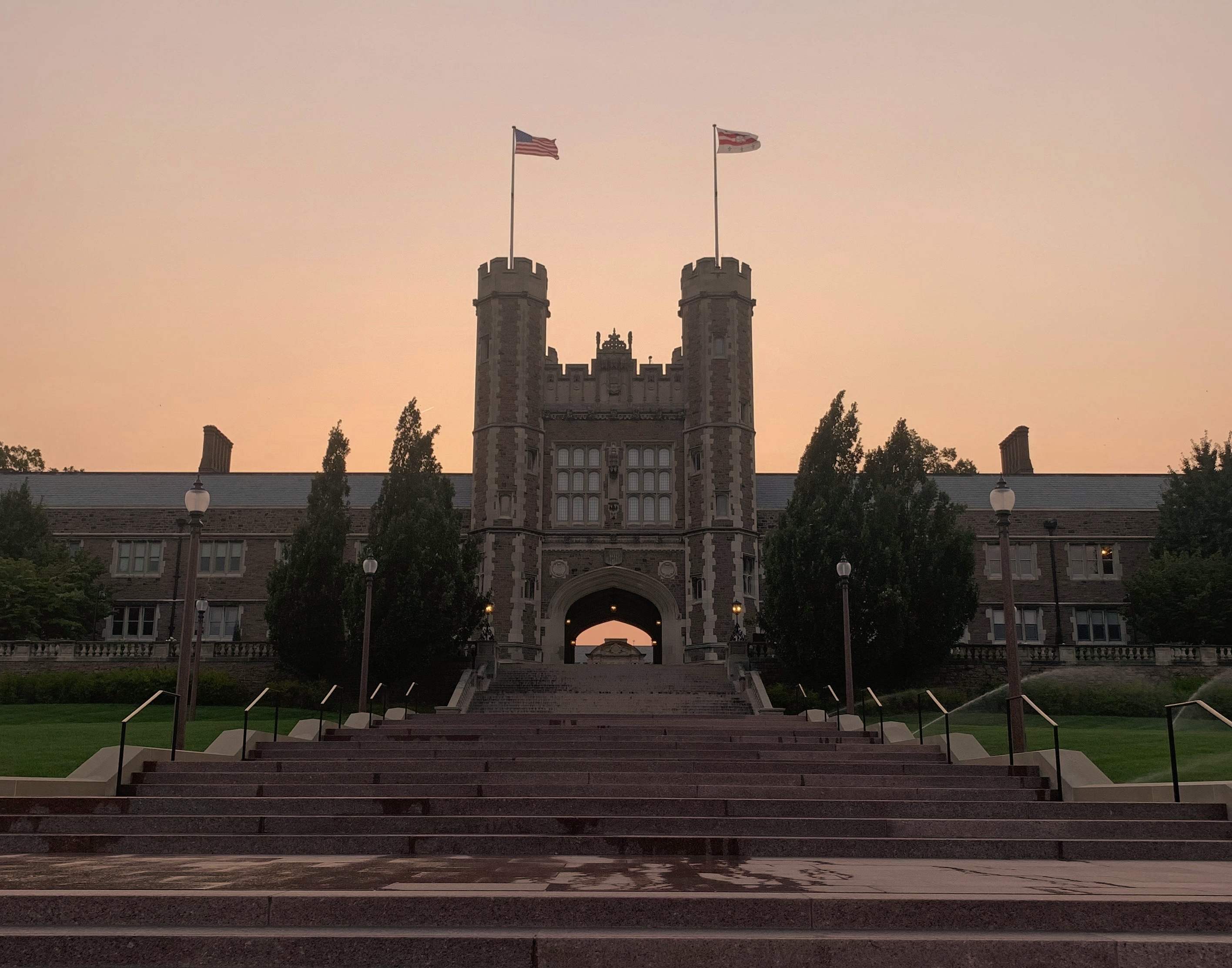
Brookings Hall during sunset in 2021

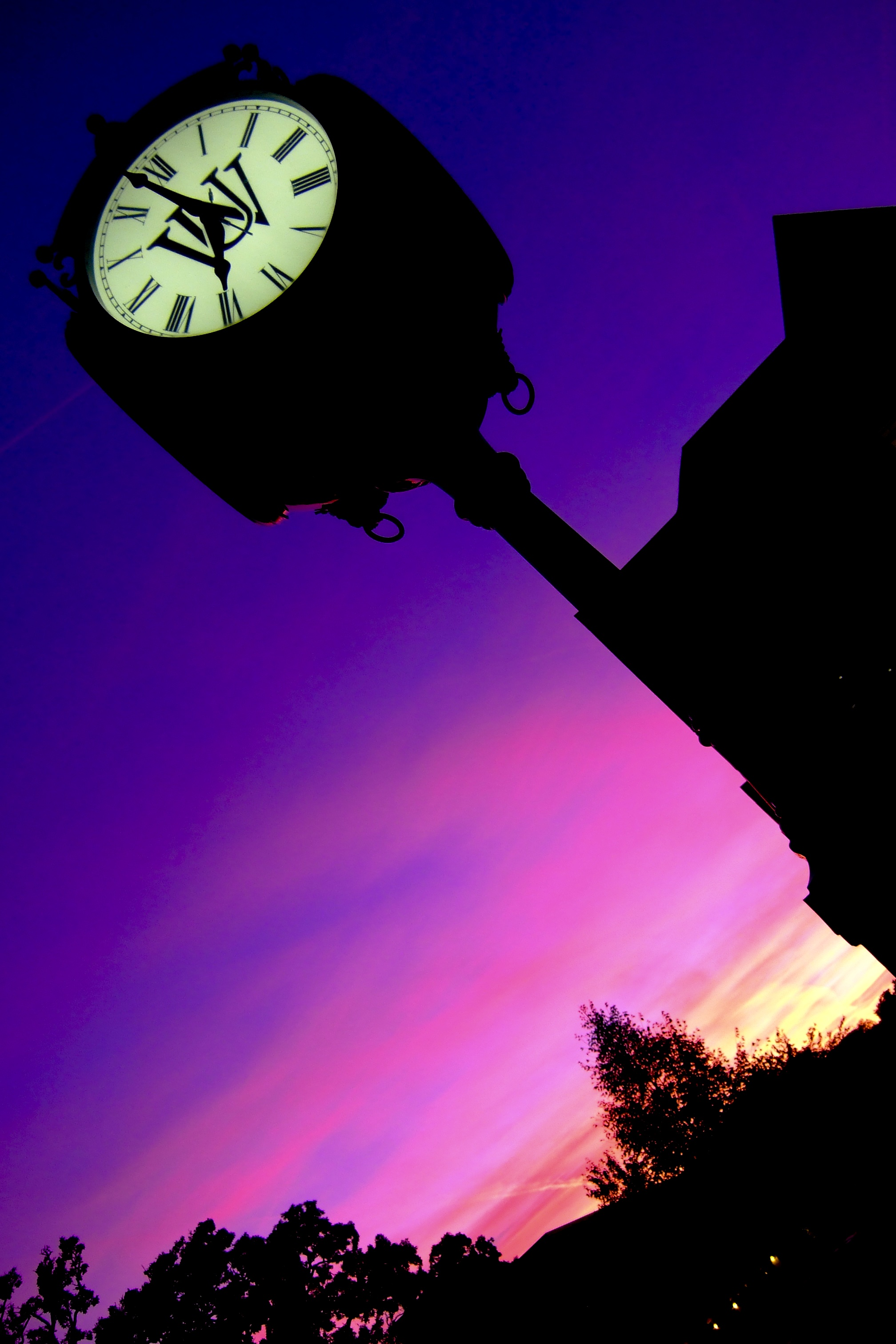
South 40 Clocktower

In 1945, four African-American students were denied admission to the university's summer school, prompting the NAACP and the city of St. Louis to file a lawsuit challenging the institution's tax-exempt status. The suit argued that the university's segregationist policies violated its obligations as a tax-exempt entity. Although the legal action did not succeed, it led the university's board of directors to publicly address the issue of segregation for the first time.

Compton, after 22 years at the University of Chicago, returned to Washington University in 1946 to become its ninth chancellor. He reestablished the Washington University football team and emphasized a "strictly amateur" athletic policy with no athletic scholarships. During Compton's tenure, the university saw enrollment growth, driven by World War II veterans using the G.I. Bill, which covered college costs for military personnel. In spring 1946, enrollment increased by 39 percent to 9,159 students; by fall 1947, enrollment had reached 13,204 students.

Before the board fully responded, the initiative for desegregation was taken up by individual deans and departments. In June 1947, the medical school sought retroactive approval for admitting an African-American student to a postgraduate course in ophthalmology, which the board granted. That same year, President Harry S. Truman's Commission on Higher Education recommended repealing segregation laws in higher education. Although the first African-American student did not begin undergraduate medical studies until 1951, by then, the medical school had already appointed African Americans to its part-time clinical faculty and named Ernest S. Sims as the first African American to hold a full-time academic appointment in the university.

Similarly, the School of Social Work began admitting African-American students in December 1947. The graduate school followed suit a few months later. In 1949, a group of students formed the Student Committee for the Admission of Negroes (SCAN). In May 1949, SCAN conducted a poll in which nearly one-third of the student body participated, with 77 percent expressing support for ending segregation. By the winter of 1949, racial tests for admission were abolished in all postbaccalaureate programs on the Hilltop Campus. The dentistry school followed in early 1950. On May 9, 1952, racial tests for admissions to undergraduate programs were abolished.

On March 5, 1958, the Board of Directors approved HOK's plans for four residence halls and a food service building. Work on the South 40, named for its location south of the Hilltop Campus and its size of 40 acres (16 ha), site commenced before July 4, 1958. The project was completed in four phases. Each wave of construction expanded residential capacity: The first group of dormitories accommodated nearly 600 students, the second added another 600, and subsequent phases continued to increase housing availability on campus. With additional on-campus housing, the university, which had been predominantly attended by commuter students, began attracting a greater number of applicants from across the nation. By 1964, over two-thirds of incoming students came from outside the St. Louis area.

==== Activism and identity ====
In the late 1960s, Black students established the Association of Black Collegians (ABC). The group (later the Association of Black Students) supported Black students, addressed issues related to campus policing, and advocated for more inclusive representation in the academic curriculum. On December 5, 1968, Elbert Walton, an MBA student, had an incident with campus police. Around 10:30 a.m., officers stopped him, and he reportedly refused to show his ID. The police then took him to the ground, handcuffed him, and placed him in a police car. Walton was later taken to the police station, where he sat in a chair while still handcuffed. When ABC learned about Walton's arrest, the group organized a sit-in at the police office, later expanding their occupation to the basement of Brookings Hall. After arrests and negotiations, the university expanded diversity efforts, including the establishment of the department of African and African-American Studies.

In May 1970, Washington University experienced student unrest in response to the U.S. invasion of Cambodia and the Kent State shooting. On the evening of May 4, a large meeting in Brookings Quadrangle led to a march of 1,200 to 1,500 students toward the AFROTC building. The building was subsequently damaged by a rock-throwing crowd and set on fire in the early hours of May 5. County firemen extinguished the fire after initial attempts by the Clayton Fire Department were hindered by protestors.

In 1971, the board of trustees appointed Chancellor William Henry Danforth. According to The New York Times, under Chancellor Danforth, Washington University transformed from a commuter school into a world-renowned institution. During his 24-year chancellorship, he established 70 new endowed professorships, constructed dozens of buildings, secured a $1.72 billion endowment, and tripled the number of student scholarships.

To better distinguish itself in national media, the university's board of trustees added the phrase "in St. Louis" in 1976.

==== Institutional development and expansion ====
In 1995, Mark S. Wrighton, the former provost at MIT, was elected the university's 14th chancellor. During Chancellor Wrighton's tenure, undergraduate applications to Washington University more than doubled, and the university has added more than 190 endowed professorships, revamped its Arts & Sciences curriculum, and completed more than 30 new buildings. The university has also built more than 50 new buildings and increased its endowment by more than $5 billion.

=== 21st century ===
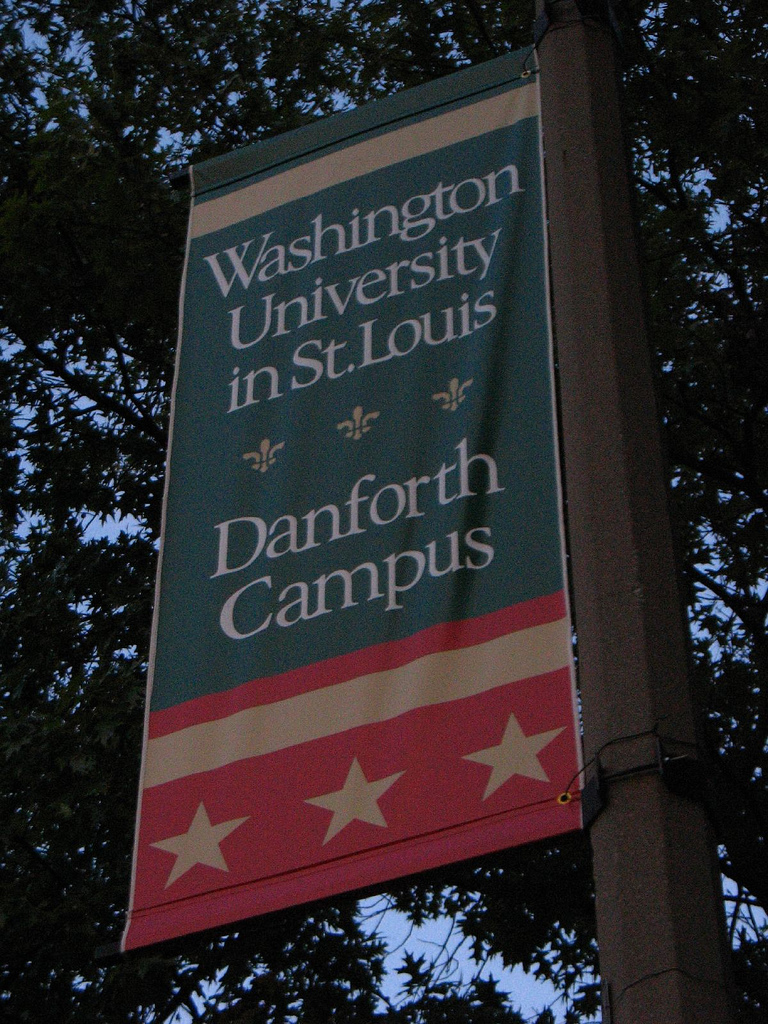
Danforth Campus banner

In 2005, Washington University established the "McDonnell International Scholars Academy", an international network of research universities aimed at addressing global challenges such as disease and poverty through academic collaboration, with an initial endowment gift of $10,000,000 (equivalent to $16,500,000 in 2025) from John F. McDonnell. Initially, it began with 15 partner institutions in Asia. As of 2022, it has more than 30 partner institutions around the world.

The Hilltop Campus was renamed the Danforth Campus in 2006 to honor former chancellor William H. Danforth.

In 2014, a study ranked Washington University first in the country for income inequality with approximately 22 percent of its students coming from the top one percent of earners, and about 6 percent from the bottom sixty percent of earners. In response to criticism, the university committed to increase the percentage of Pell-eligible students on campus from 6 percent to 13 percent by 2020. The university achieved that goal three years early, and as of 2022, 19.9 percent of undergraduate students were eligible for Pell Grants, representing a 300 percent increase since 2012.

In June 2019, Andrew D. Martin, the former dean of the College of Literature, Science, and the Arts at the University of Michigan, was elected the university's 15th chancellor. At his inauguration, Martin announced the "WashU Pledge", a program that offers free tuition to full-time students from Missouri and southern Illinois whose families either earn $75,000 or less per year or qualify for Pell Grants (federal money that helps low-income students pay for college and doesn't need to be repaid). In 2021, the university launched a $1 billion plan called Gateway to Success. $800 million for need-blind admission (meaning students are accepted without looking at their financial needs) and to cover all their financial need. Another $200 million was set aside to help graduate and professional students pay for school. Under Martin's leadership, the School of Continuing & Professional Studies was redesigned to make college more accessible for more people. He also expanded the WashU Pledge and started the Heartland Initiative to help talented students from the region succeed and stay after graduation.

In 2024, Washington University purchased the 16-acre campus of neighboring Fontbonne University, which closed in 2025, for $39 million. In 2026, WashU announced it had entered into an agreement to merge with the University of Health Sciences and Pharmacy in St. Louis following the 2026–27 academic year. Under the agreement, WashU will assume control of UHSP's campus as well as its St. Louis College of Pharmacy, which will be renamed to WashU St. Louis College of Pharmacy and become WashU's 10th academic school.

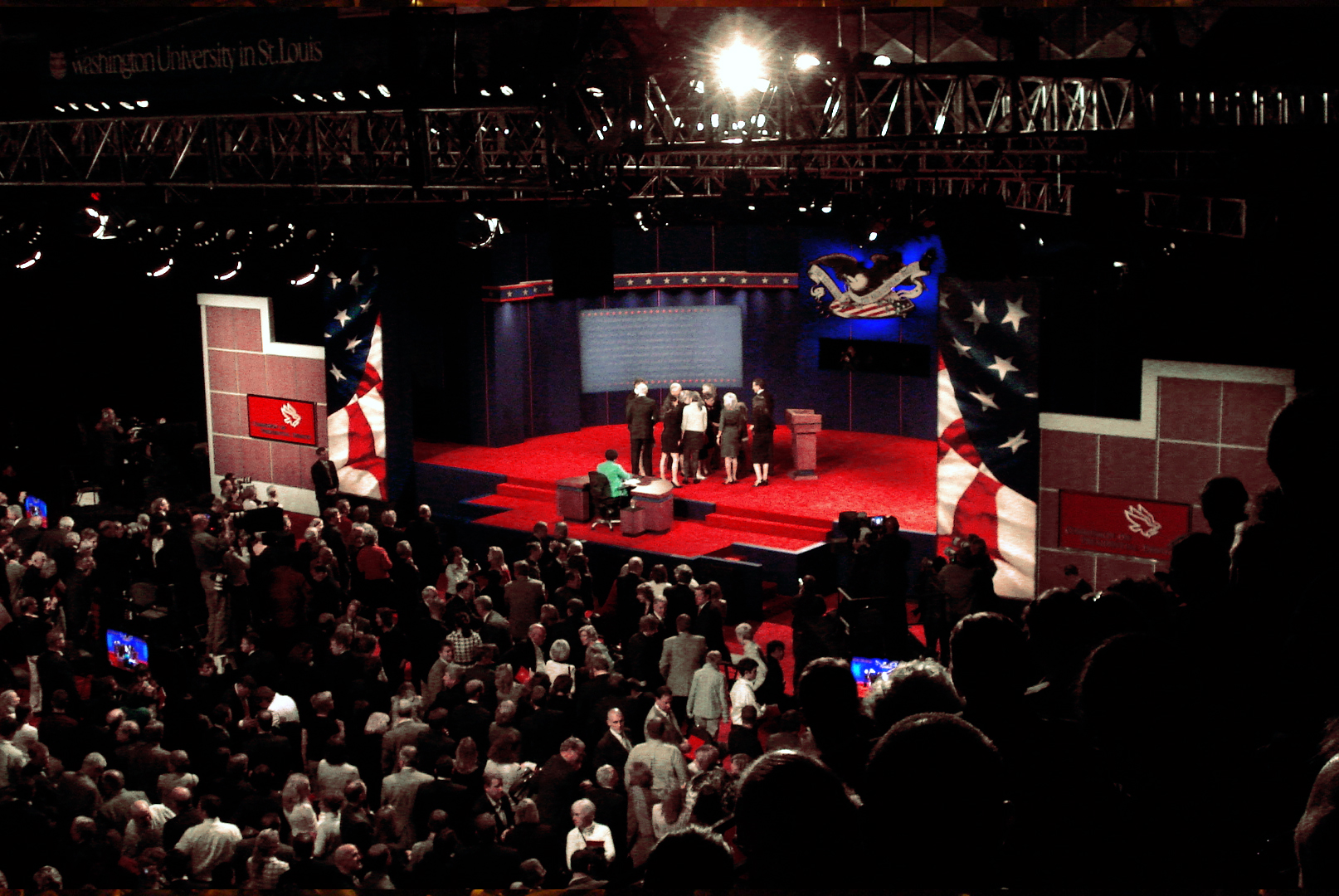
2008 Vice Presidential Debate at the Washington University Field House

=== U.S. presidential and vice-presidential debates ===
As of 2026, Washington University has been the venue for four presidential debates and one vice-presidential debate: the inaugural 1992 presidential debate on October 11, 1992, the third 2000 Presidential debate on October 17, the second 2004 Presidential debate on October 8, the sole 2008 Vice Presidential debate between Joe Biden and Sarah Palin on October 2, and the second 2016 Presidential debate on October 9. A 1996 debate was scheduled but canceled when the number of debates was reduced to two.

== Organization and administration ==
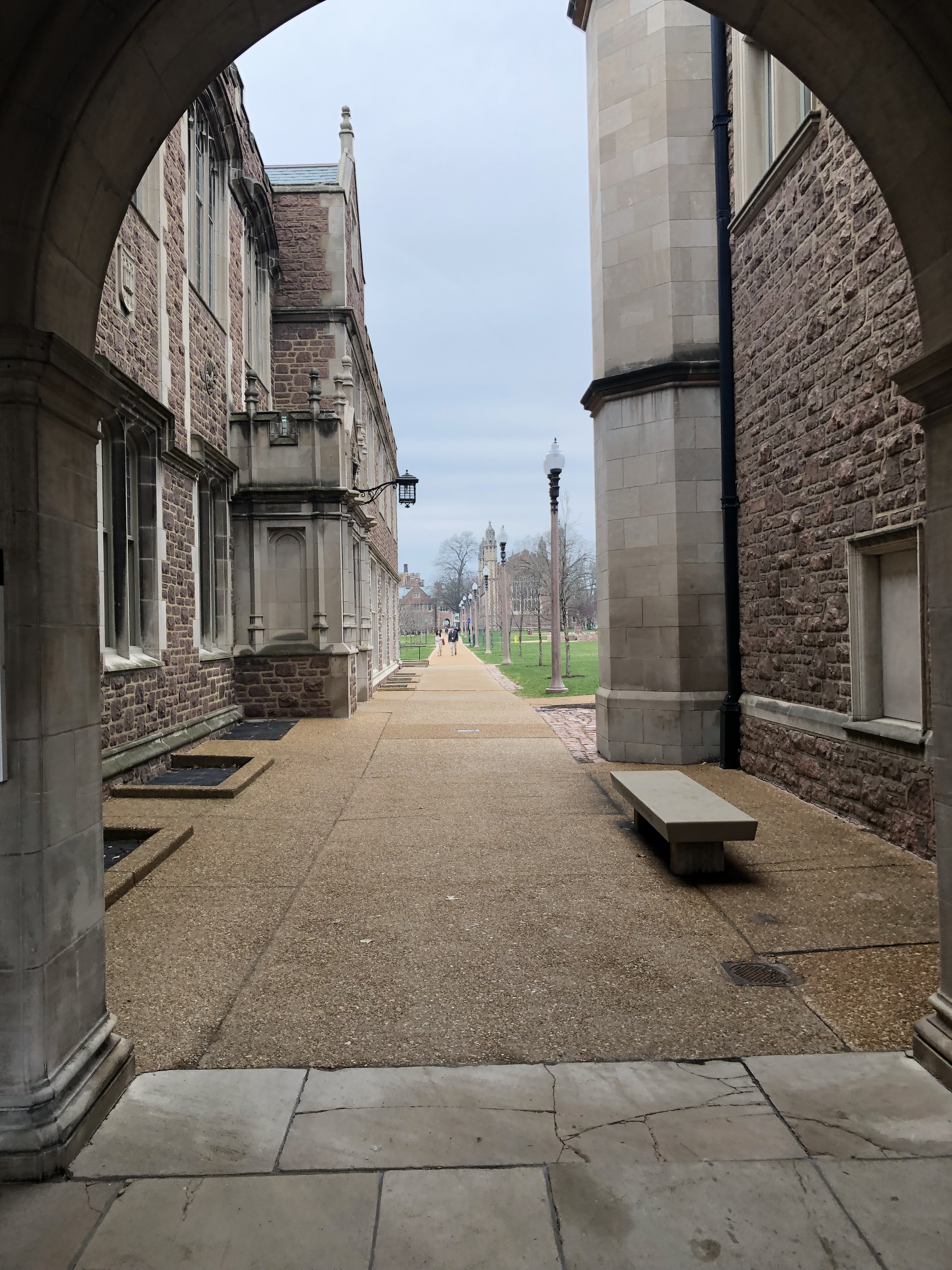
Danforth Campus buildings

From its inception, Washington University has been governed by an independent board of trustees which, by charter, appoints its own members. Trustees serve four-year terms and may be eligible for re-election upon the completion of a term. The Board is responsible for the university's fiduciary oversight, strategic governance, and major institutional decisions, including setting policy and providing overall guidance. These include appointing the chancellor, reviewing and approving the annual budget, authorizing major capital expenditures, making final decisions on tenure and degree conferrals, and approving the creation of new academic programs.

From 1983 to 1987, the "Alliance for Washington University" campaign raised more than $630,500,000 (equivalent to $1,786,800,000 in 2025). From 1998 to 2004, the "Campaign for Washington University" raised more than $1,550,000,000 (equivalent to $2,898,000,000 in 2025).

On June 1, 2019, Andrew D. Martin was appointed the 15th chancellor of Washington University after Chancellor Mark S Wrighton announced his plans to retire. The chancellor is responsible for overseeing the university's day-to-day operations, including managing staff, implementing the board's policies and decisions, ensuring compliance, and leading strategic initiatives. The chancellor also provides vision and leadership across academics, research, fundraising, and administration.

In 2025, Mark D. West, former dean of University of Michigan Law School, was appointed Provost.

Washington University is a member of the Association of American Universities, American Association of Colleges and Universities, Universities Research Association, American Council of Learned Societies Research University Consortium, and is accredited by the Higher Learning Commission.

=== Finances, costs, and financial aid ===
As of June 30, 2024, Washington University has an endowment of $12.0 billion, ranking it among the top 15 university endowments in the United States. Its total assets (including its campus) are valued at $20.48 billion. In Fiscal Year 2024, it had an operating budget of $5.23 billion of which 11 percent came from endowment spending. Of its $5.23 billion operating budget, it had expenses of $5.08 billion. Of the $5.08 billion, $3.026 billion went to instruction, $892.7 million to research, $489.8 million to academic support, $296.4 to institutional support, $165.1 million to auxiliary enterprises, $161.3 million to student services, and $51.6 million to other deductions.

For the 2025–‍2026 academic year, Washington University charged a tuition fee of $68,240 per student, with a total estimated on-campus cost of attendance of $92,932. Washington University practices need-blind admissions and meets 100 percent of admitted students' demonstrated needs. Of the 1,823 first-year students enrolled in 2023–2024, 929 applied for need-based financial aid, and 796 were determined to have financial need. Among those 796 students, 100 percent of demonstrated need was met on average (excluding any aid awarded beyond calculated need). It does not offer any athletic scholarships.

== Campuses ==
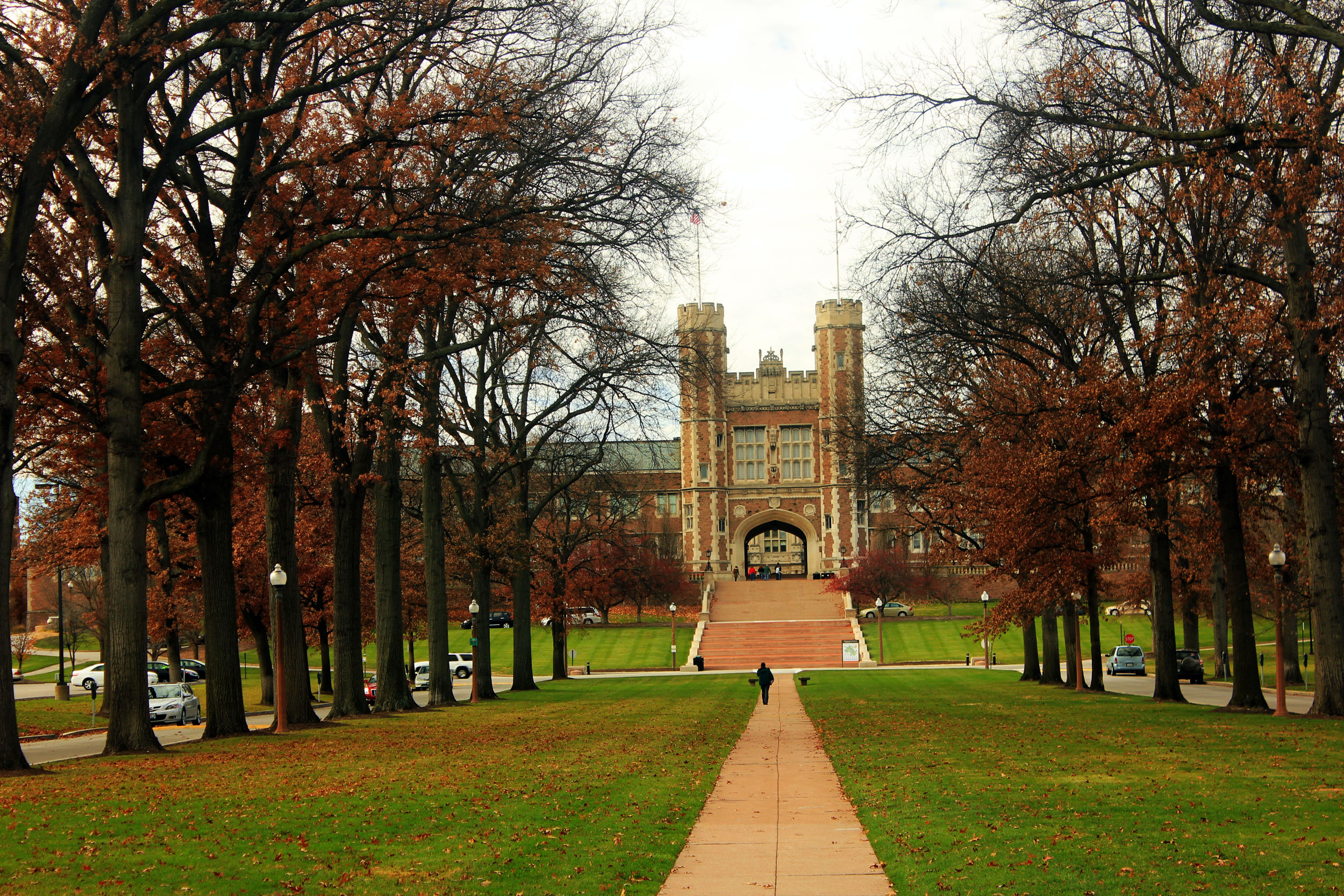
View of Danforth Campus in 2012

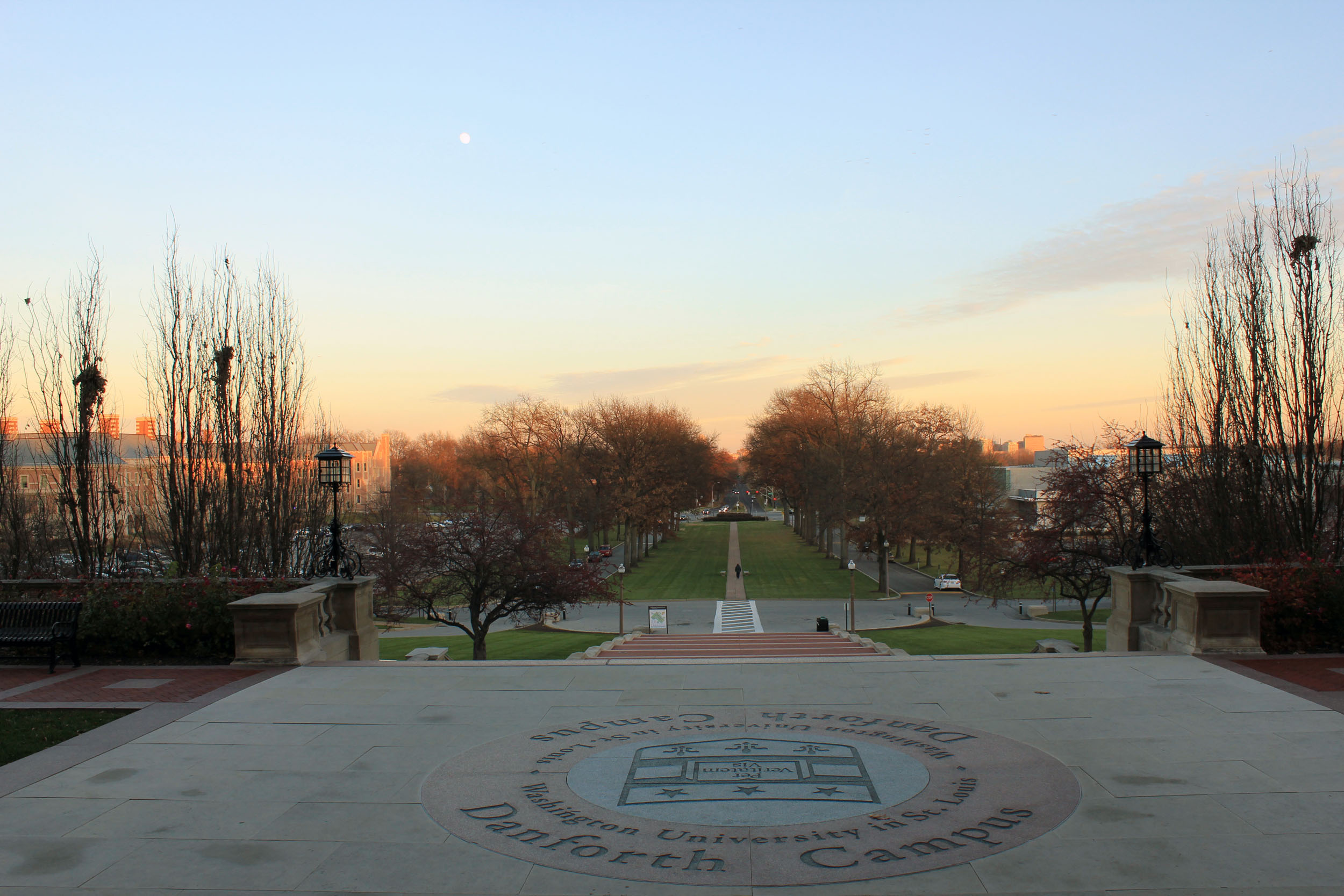
View of Danforth Campus from top of the quad (2012)

=== Danforth ===
In 1899, the university held a national design competition for a new campus. The Philadelphia firm Cope & Stewardson, known for their work at the University of Pennsylvania, Bryn Mawr College, and Princeton University, won with a design based on Collegiate Gothic quadrangles inspired by the universities of Oxford and Cambridge.

The university's 169-acre Danforth Campus is bordered by the Forest Park section of St. Louis and Clayton and University City, Missouri. A large portion of the Danforth Campus is recognized as the Washington University Hilltop Campus Historic District, which is a National Historic Landmark.

=== Medical ===
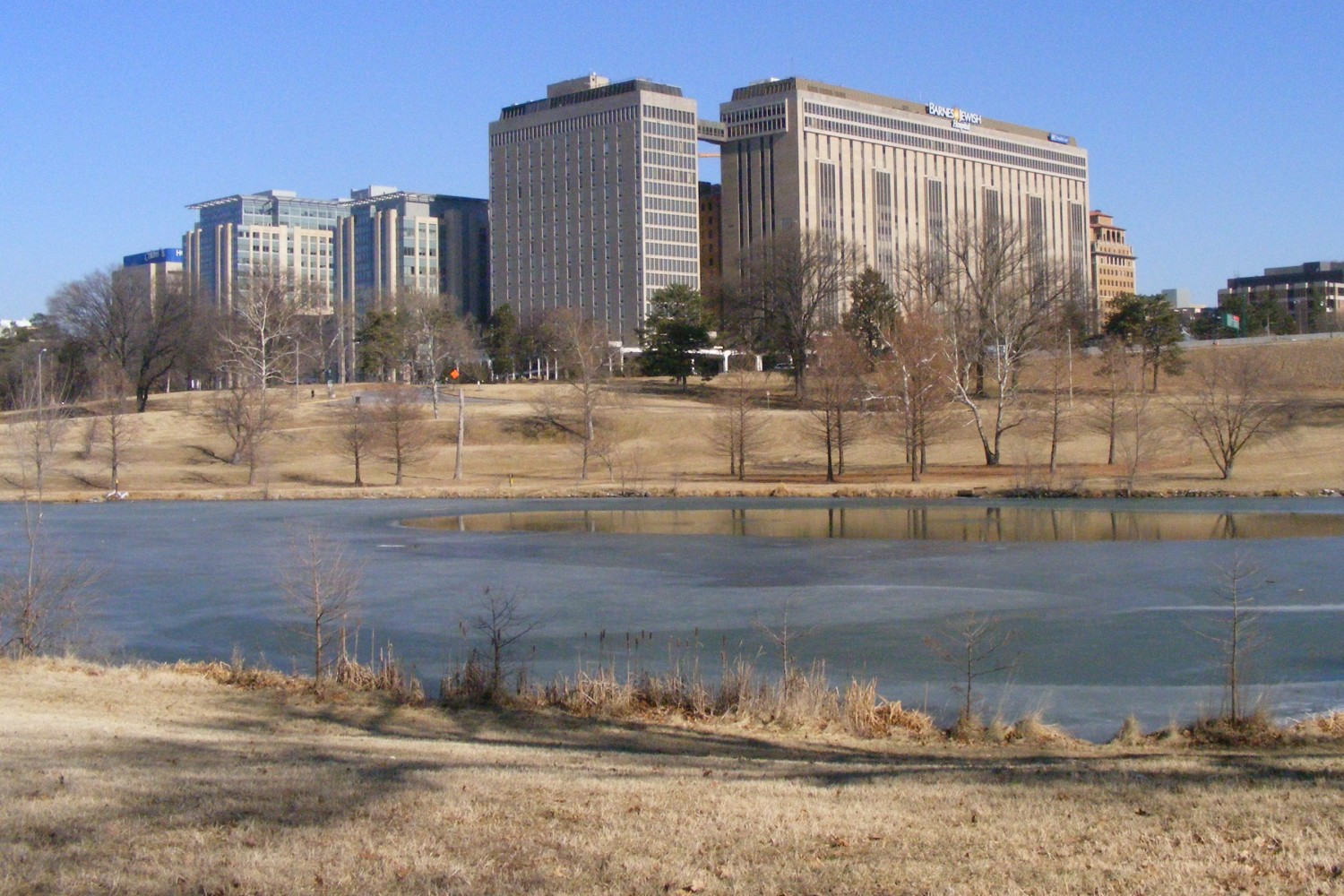
The Washington University Medical Center as seen from Forest Park in 2009.

Washington University Medical Center comprises 186 acres (75.3 ha) spread over 18 city blocks, located along the eastern edge of Forest Park within the Central West End neighborhood of St. Louis. The campus is home to the Washington University School of Medicine and its partners, Barnes-Jewish Hospital and St. Louis Children's Hospital.

In 2019, Washington University was awarded a $7.6 million grant from the National Cancer Institute to establish the Implementation Science Center for Cancer Control to address disparities in cancer care in parts of Missouri and Illinois. In 2022, Washington University's Institute of Clinical and Translational Sciences was awarded a five-year $61 million grant from the National Center for Advancing Translational Sciences of the National Institutes of Health, to advance precision medicine, health equity, and diversity initiatives.

== Academics ==
In 2023, Washington University was one of 10 universities picked to join the Kessler Scholars Collaborative, which provides support for selected first-generation and Pell-Grant eligible STEM students. The program aims to recruit 20 fully funded Kessler scholars per year and provide additional opportunities to close the wealth gap.

=== Admissions ===
For the class of 2028 (entering fall 2024), Washington University in St. Louis received over 32,750 applications and admitted 12 percent of applicants. Of those admitted, 86 percent who reported their rank were in the top 10 percent of their high-school class. Additionally, 25 percent of enrolled students were Pell Grant-eligible, and 18 percent were first-generation college students.

The middle 50 percent of admitted students who submitted standardized test scores scored between 33 and 35 on the ACT (out of a maximum score of 36), and between 1500 and 1570 on the SAT (out of a maximum score of 1600). National averages for these tests are approximately 19.4 for the ACT and 1050 for the SAT. For comparison, admitted students scored in the 98th to 99th national percentile, indicating that these students outperformed 98 to 99 percent of recent test takers.

The student-faculty ratio is 7:1.

=== Libraries ===
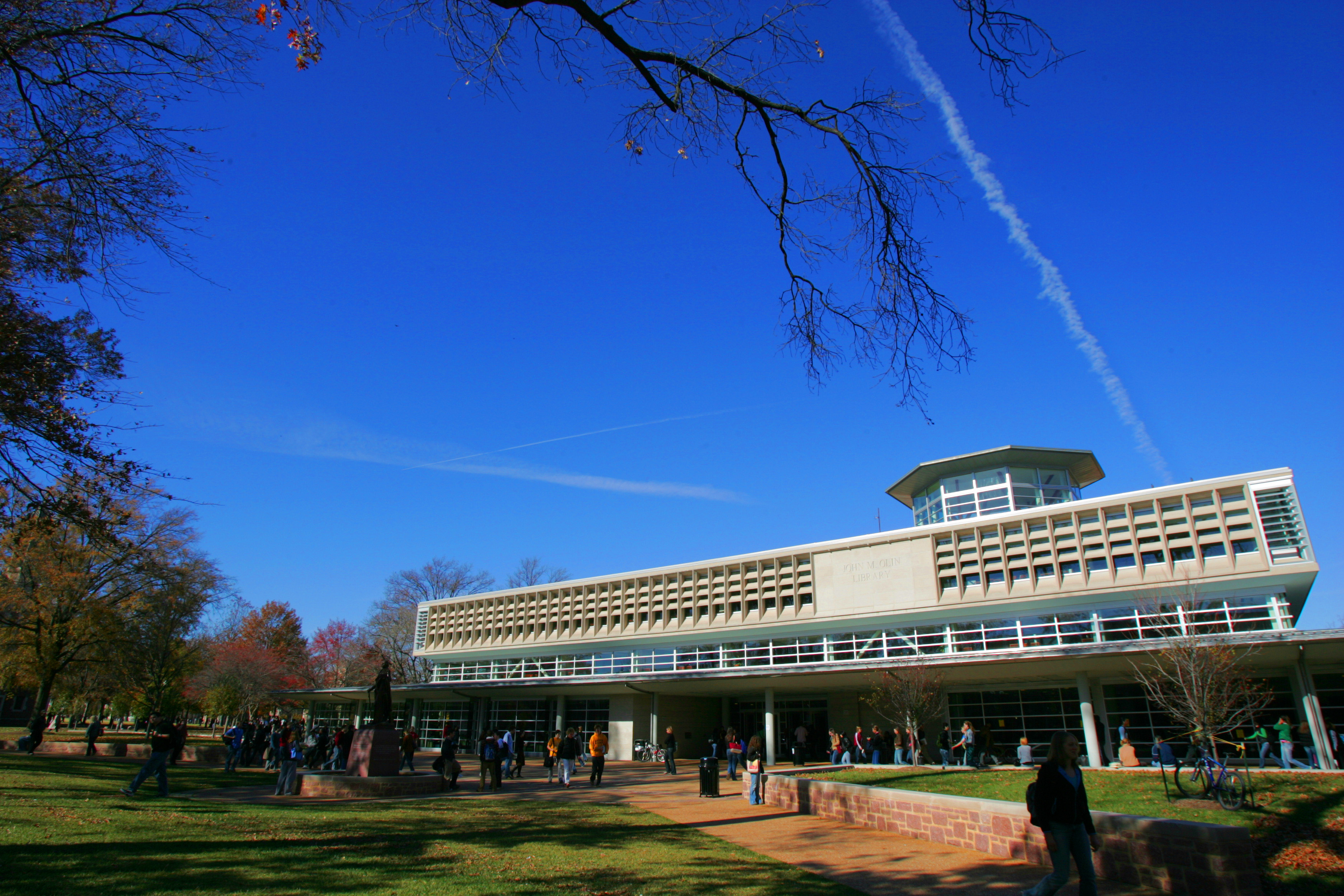
Olin Library (2008)

The Washington University library system comprises nine libraries, with Olin Library serving as the main library. According to the American Library Association, it is the 44th largest library in the United States by volume count, holding over 5.3 million volumes. It is a member of the Association of Research Libraries. The remaining eight libraries in the system include Al and Ruth Kopolow (Business) Library, Bernard Becker Medical Library, Brown School Library, East Asian Library, Gaylord Music Library, Kenneth and Nancy Kranzberg Art & Architecture Library, Law Library and West Campus Library.

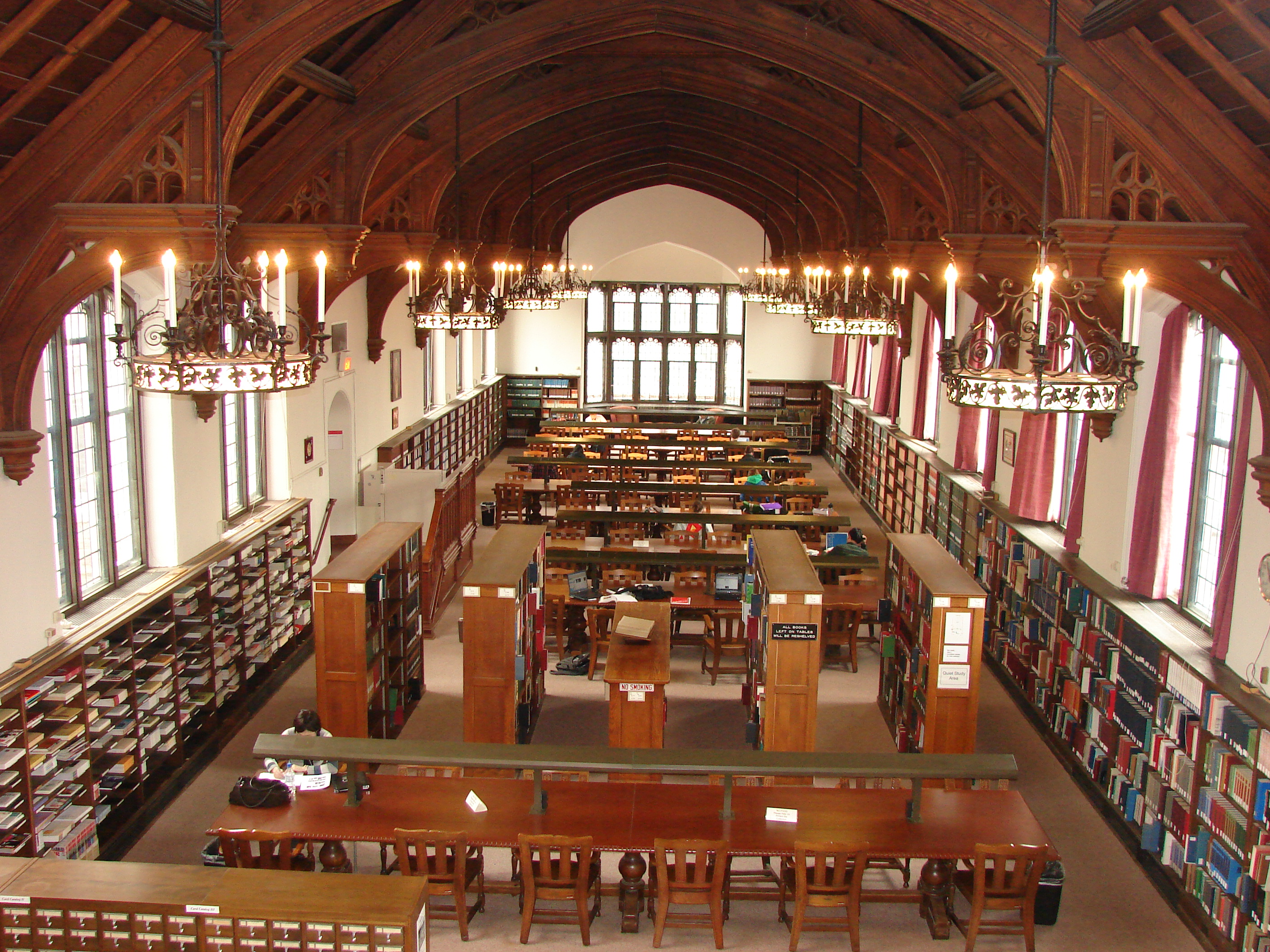
East Asian Library

The Department of Special Collections at Washington University Libraries encompasses four units: Rare Books, Manuscripts, University Archives, and the Film & Media Archive. These units collectively house a wide array of materials, ranging from ancient manuscripts to contemporary documentary film archives.

Washington University holds a copy of the Southwick Broadside, one of the few surviving printed broadsides of the Declaration of Independence. Donated to the university in 2015, it is now part of the university's Special Collections.

=== Rankings and reputation ===
Academic rankings

National
- Forbes: 25
- U.S. News & World Report: 16 (tie)
- Washington Monthly: 69
- WSJ/College Pulse: 26

Global
- ARWU: 26
- QS: 162
- THE: 67
- U.S. News & World Report: 32

Washington University is ranked 16th in the nation in the 2027 U.S. News & World Report National Universities ranking and 26th by The Wall Street Journal in their rankings. In 2025, the university was ranked 26th in the world by the Academic Ranking of World Universities.

Graduate Rankings according to U.S. News & World Report
Audiology	8
Biological Sciences	15
Business	24
Chemistry	42
Computer Science	45
Earth Sciences	33
Economics	29
Engineering	43
English	26
History	36
Law	14
Mathematics	43
Medicine	5 (Note: In 2023, Washington University School of Medicine, along with other universities announced that they will no longer submit data to U.S. News & World Report to support their "best medical schools" survey and ranking.)
Occupational Therapy	3
Physical Therapy	1
Political Science	13
Psychology	8
Public Health	22
Social Work	2
Statistics	31

In its 2025 edition, Princeton Review ranked Washington University as number 1 for "Top Midwest Entrepreneurship: Ugrad" and as number 2 for "Top Entrepreneurship Under Ten Thousand Students: Ugrad".

In 2025, Washington University in St. Louis was included in Forbes' 2025 New Ivies: 20 Great Colleges Employers Love, which highlights universities known for their academic rigor and producing graduates who are highly sought after by employers, with many graduates considered by employers to be outpacing their Ivy League peers.

In the 2016 edition of The Hidden Ivies: 63 of America's Top Liberal Arts Colleges and Universities, a guidebook by educational consultants Howard and Matthew Greene, included Washington University in St. Louis among the institutions they described as offering an Ivy League-level education in terms of academic rigor, intellectual atmosphere, and campus experience.

Washington University is among the top institutions producing recipients of various competitive postgraduate fellowships, including the Fulbright program, Harry S. Truman Scholarship, and Rhodes Scholarship.

=== Research ===
College/School	Year founded
College of Arts & Sciences	1853
James McKelvey School of Engineering	1854
School of Law	1867
College of Art	1879
School of Medicine	1891
College of Architecture	1910
Olin Business School	1917
Graduate School of Arts & Sciences	1922
George Warren Brown School of Social Work	1925
School of Continuing & Professional Studies	1931
Sam Fox School of Design & Visual Arts	2005
Bursky School of Public Health	2025

Washington University is classified as an R1 university, denoting "Very High Research Spending and Doctorate Production" on the Carnegie Classification of Institutions of Higher Education. The Carnegie Classification helps categorize colleges and universities based on data like research activity and degrees awarded.

According to the National Science Foundation's Higher Education Research and Development Survey for fiscal year As of fiscal year 2023, Washington University ranks 27th among U.S. institutions in total research and development (R&D) expenditures. In that year, Washington University reported $1.169 billion in R&D spending, reflecting an 11.7 percent increase from the previous year. In 2022, Washington University developed a nasal vaccine aimed at addressing COVID-19; it was licensed for use in India to Indian vaccine maker Bharat Biotech and the technology was licensed to bio-tech company Ocugen. Bharat named their licensed version of the vaccine iNCOVACC. In 2025, Washington University's vaccine was approved for clinical trials in the United States.

In 2019, Washington University School of Medicine took over Folding@Home, a distributed computing project, from Stanford University. The project, which taps into the idle power of personal computers owned by volunteers to simulate protein folding, reached a speed of 1.5 exaFLOPS in 2020—seven times faster than the world's top supercomputer, Summit, and more powerful than the top 100 supercomputers in the world, combined. This speed fuels research into diseases like Alzheimer's, cancer, COVID-19, and Ebola.

Washington University hosts NASA's Planetary Data System Geosciences Node, supporting unmanned Mars missions, with Professor Raymond Arvidson serving as deputy principal investigator for the Mars Exploration Rovers and co-investigator for the Phoenix lander's robotic arm.

Beyond STEM, Washington University students have digitized the works of 16th-century poet Edmund Spenser. Led by English professor Joseph Loewenstein and supported by a $150,000 grant from the National Endowment for the Humanities, the project marks the first major update to Spenser's collected works since Oxford University Press's edition nearly a century ago. The new edition, produced in collaboration with scholars at four other universities, will include both a comprehensive print publication and a digital archive.

=== Colleges and schools ===
Across its schools, it offers more than 150 undergraduate, 80 master's and professional, and 50 doctoral degree programs.

- The College of Arts & Sciences is home to the university's largest undergraduate program, providing students selection of courses across more than 50 disciplines, including anthropology, chemistry, English, the performing arts and women, gender and sexuality studies.
- The George Warren Brown School of Social Work was founded in 1925. The school was endowed by Bettie Bofinger Brown and named for her husband, George Warren Brown, a St. Louis philanthropist and co-founder of the Brown Shoe Company. In 1948, it became the first school at Washington University to admit black students.
- The James McKelvey School of Engineering was named on January 31, 2019, when the School of Engineering & Applied Science was renamed in honor of trustee and alumnus Jim McKelvey Jr., co-founder of Square, following his substantial donation.
- The Olin Business School, originally established as the School of Commerce and Finance in 1917, was named after John M. Olin in the 1980s. In 2002, an Executive MBA program was established in Shanghai, in cooperation with Fudan University.
- The Sam Fox School of Design & Visual Arts was founded in 2006, merging the existing academic units of Architecture and Art with the university's museum. The school comprises the College of Architecture, Graduate School of Architecture & Urban Design, College of Art, Graduate School of Art and the Mildred Lane Kemper Art Museum. It was the first art museum west of the Mississippi. Steinberg Hall, completed in 1960, was the first commissioned project by Pritzker Prize-winning architect Fumihiko Maki.
- The School of Continuing & Professional Studies (CAPS) was established in June 2023, when Washington University renamed University College. CAPS was established to focus on adult learners with a focus on rapidly growing and high paying fields like data analytics, education, healthcare, and management. The pre-nursing program was developed in partnership with Goldfarb School of Nursing at Barnes-Jewish College.
- The Bursky School of Public Health was established in 2025. It was renamed in 2026 after Andrew and Jane Bursky following a gift from the Bursky Family Foundation in 2026.
- The Washington University School of Law (established in 1867) is the oldest continuously operating law school west of the Mississippi River. Washington University School of Law offers joint-degree programs with the Olin Business School, the Graduate School of Arts and Sciences, the School of Medicine, and the School of Social Work. Since 1997, Anheuser-Busch Hall has been home to the School of Law.
- The Washington University School of Medicine was established in 1891. In 2024, it ranked second in the United States for National Institutes of Health (the government agency responsible for biomedical and public-health research) funding.
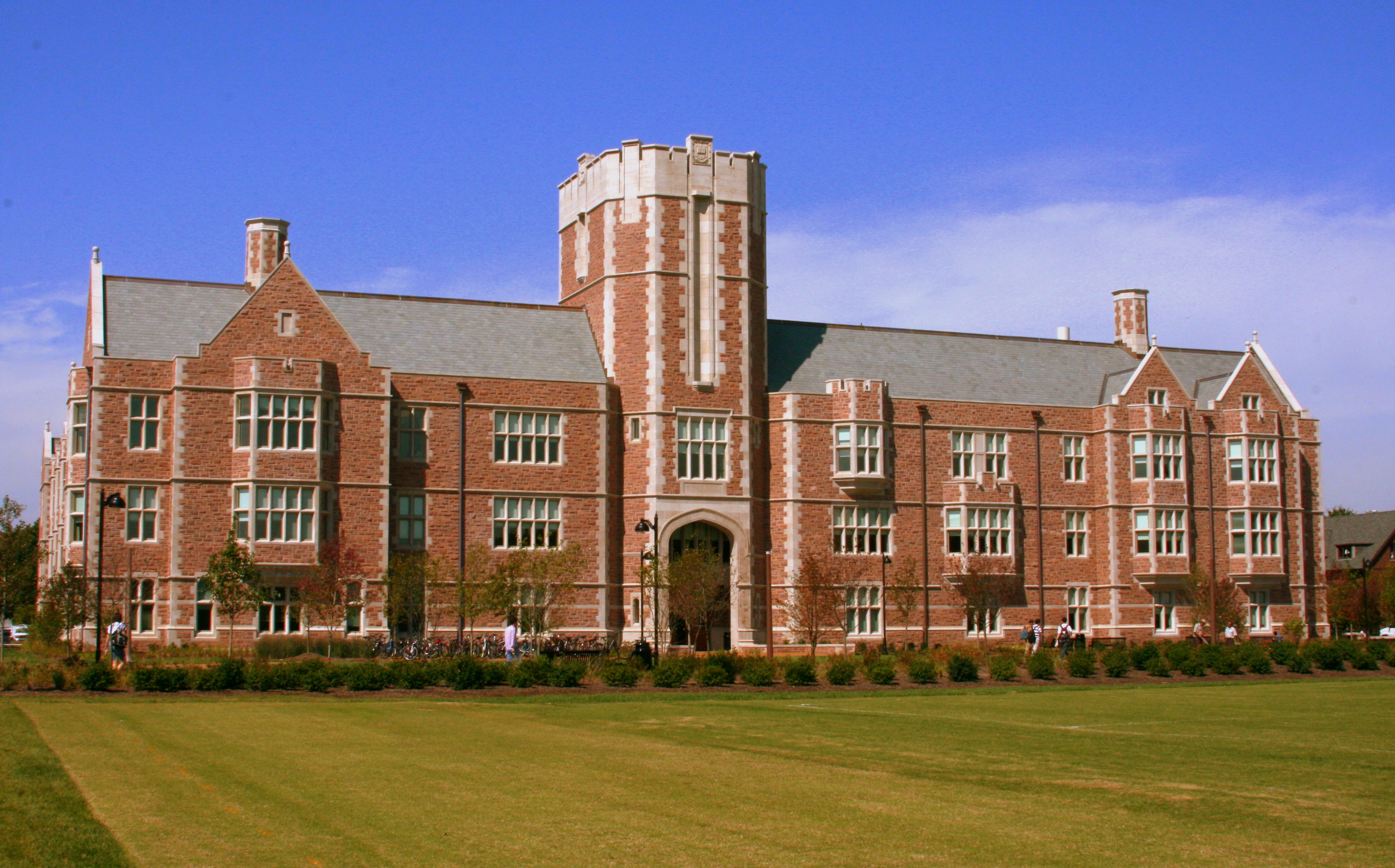
Seigle Hall (2008), shared by the School of Law and the College of Arts and Sciences

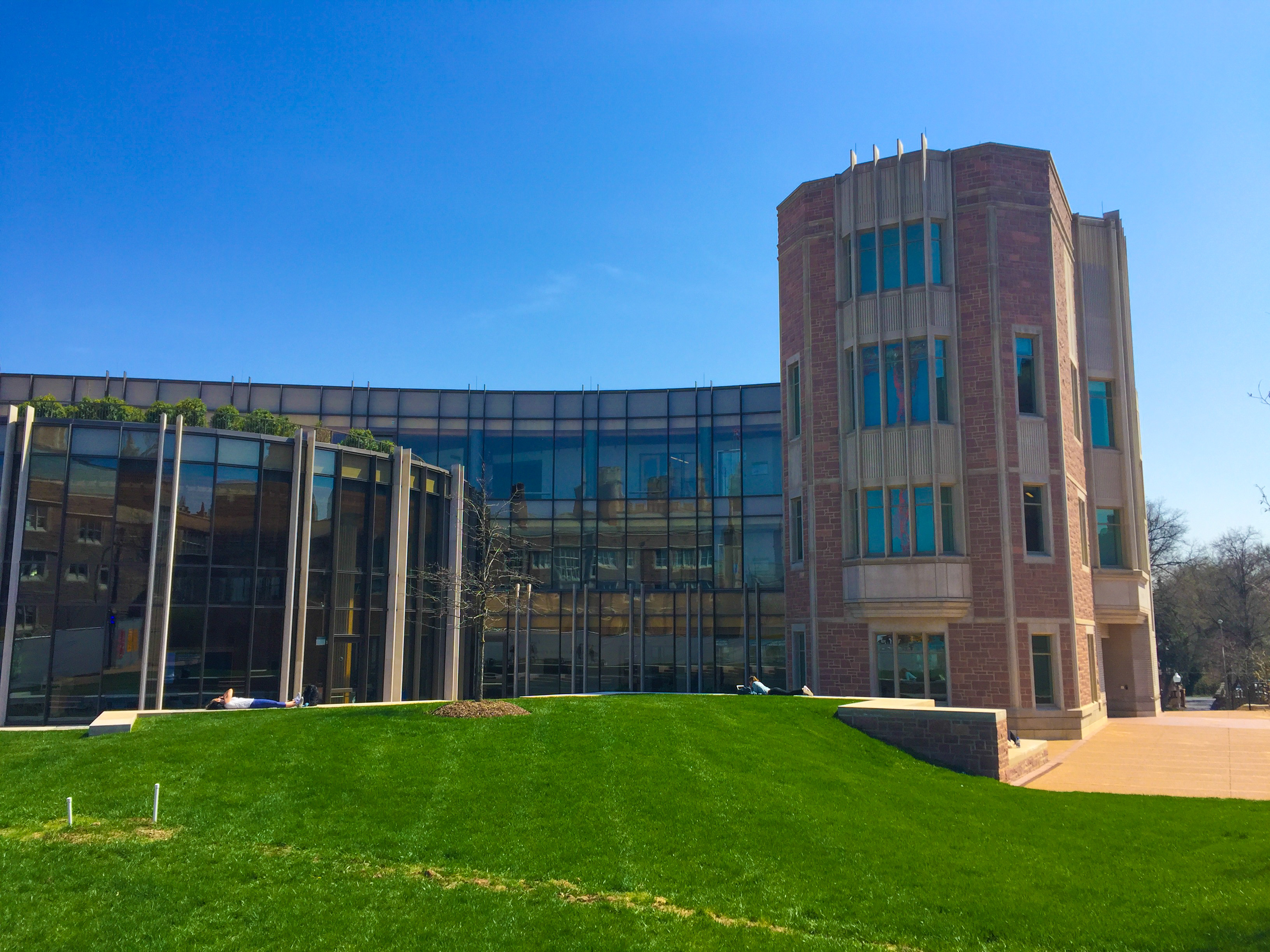
George Warren Brown School of Social Work, built in 1948.

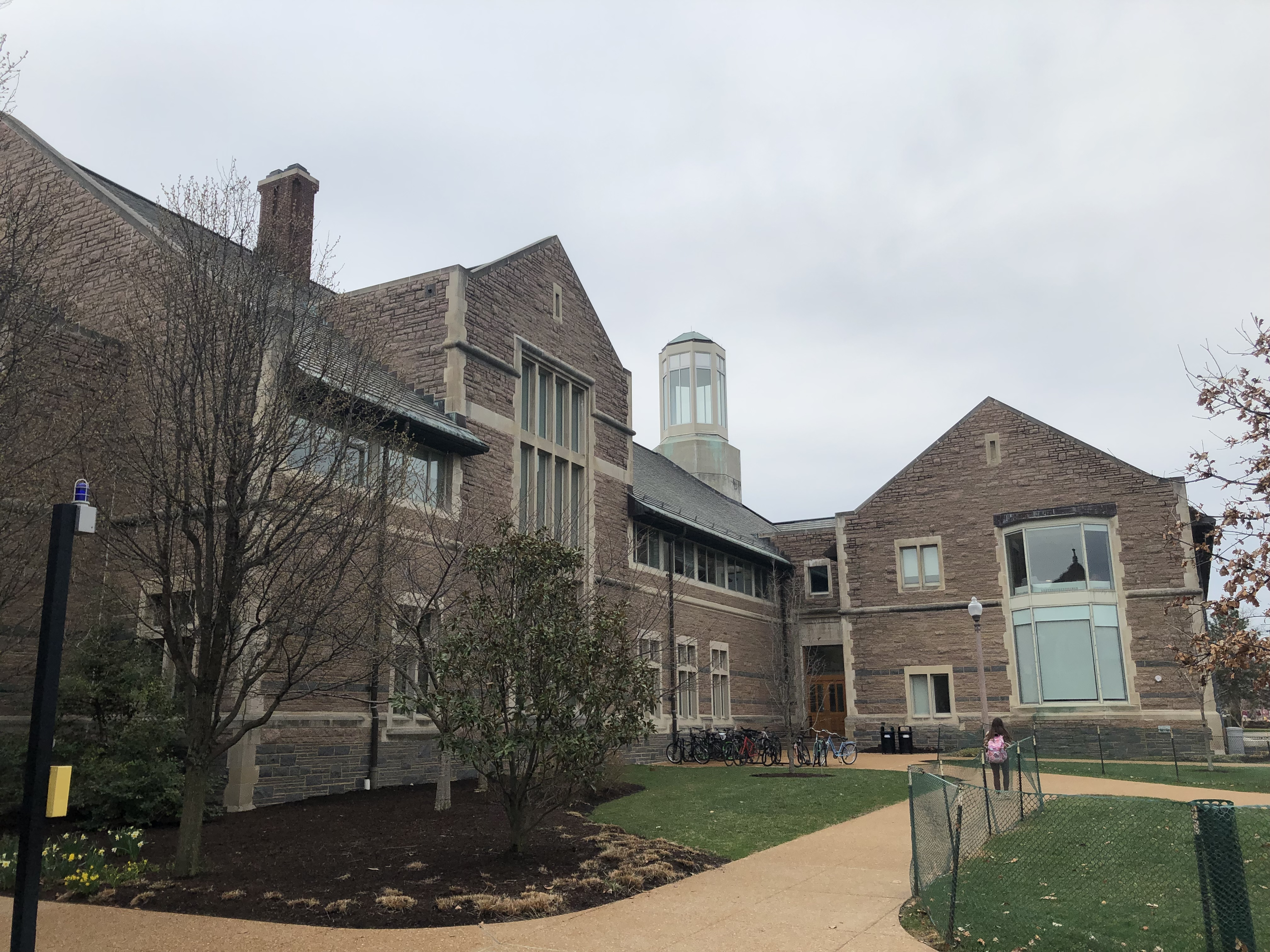
Simon Hall (2019) is a part of the Olin Business School.

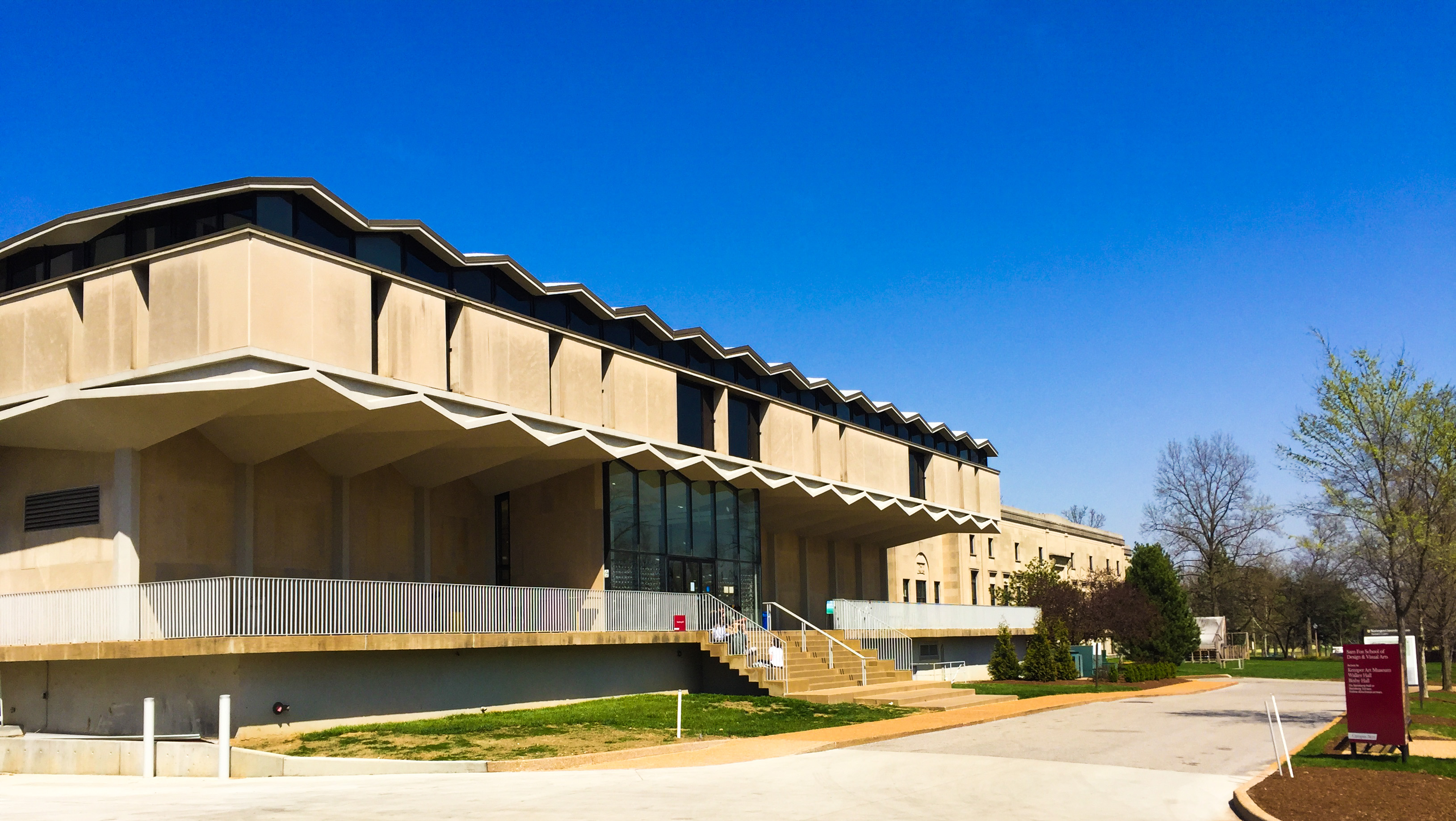
Steinburg Hall (completed in 1960) is part of the Sam Fox School of Design & Visual Arts.

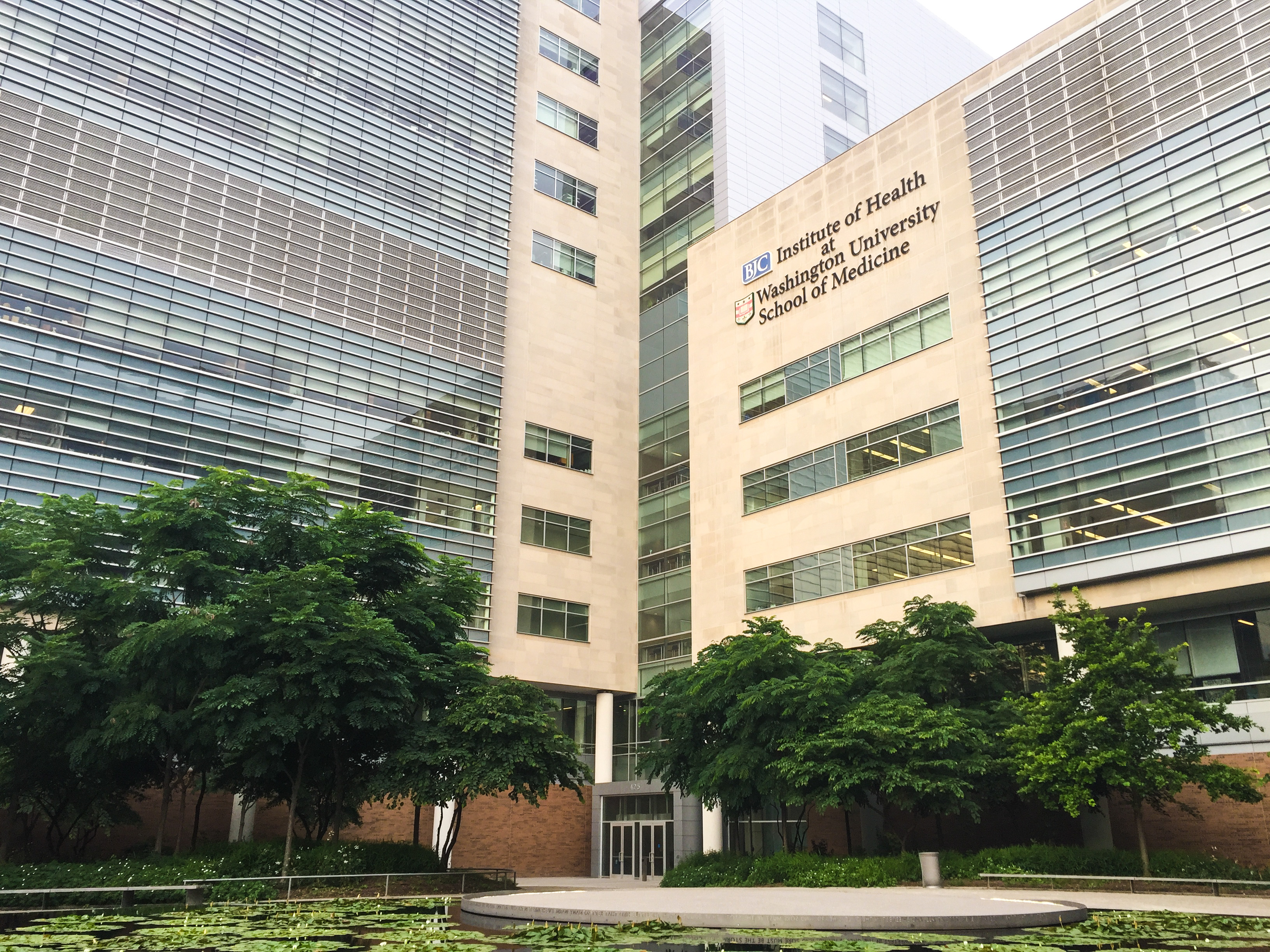
Washington University School of Medicine was established in 1891.

== Campus life ==
=== Student body ===
Student body composition as of March 8, 2025
Race and ethnicity	Total
White	44%
Asian	20%
Hispanic	12%
Black	9%
Other (Note: "Other" consists of multiracial Americans and those who prefer not to say.)	8%
Foreign national	7%
Economic diversity
Low-income (Note: The percentage of students who received an income-based federal Pell grant intended for low-income students.)	16%

As of 2025, Washington University has 15,952 enrolled students who come from all 50 U.S. states and 105 countries. This includes 8,164 undergraduate students and 6,922 graduate students.

Of the 1,848 first year students enrolled in fall 2024, 37 percent were white/Caucasian, 26 percent were Asian, 12 percent were Latino/Hispanic, 8 percent were black/African-American, 11 percent were international, and 5 percent did not identify; 53 percent were female and 47 percent were male.

=== Student organizations ===
Washington University has over 400 undergraduate student organizations on campus. Most receive funding by the Washington University Student Union, which, as of fiscal year 2026 has an annual budget of $4.6 million. The Student Union sponsors major campus programs including WILD and distributes free copies of The New York Times, USA Today, and the St. Louis Post-Dispatch through The Collegiate Readership Program.

Washington University has 26 recognized chapters of fraternities and sororities. In 2020, nearly half of Washington University's fraternity and sorority members canceled their memberships following student-led criticism that historically white fraternities and sororities contributed to racism and sexism on campus. Two sororities folded completely, and others lost more than 80 percent of their membership. The university has since faced ongoing calls from students to remove fraternities and sororities from campus.

=== Residences ===
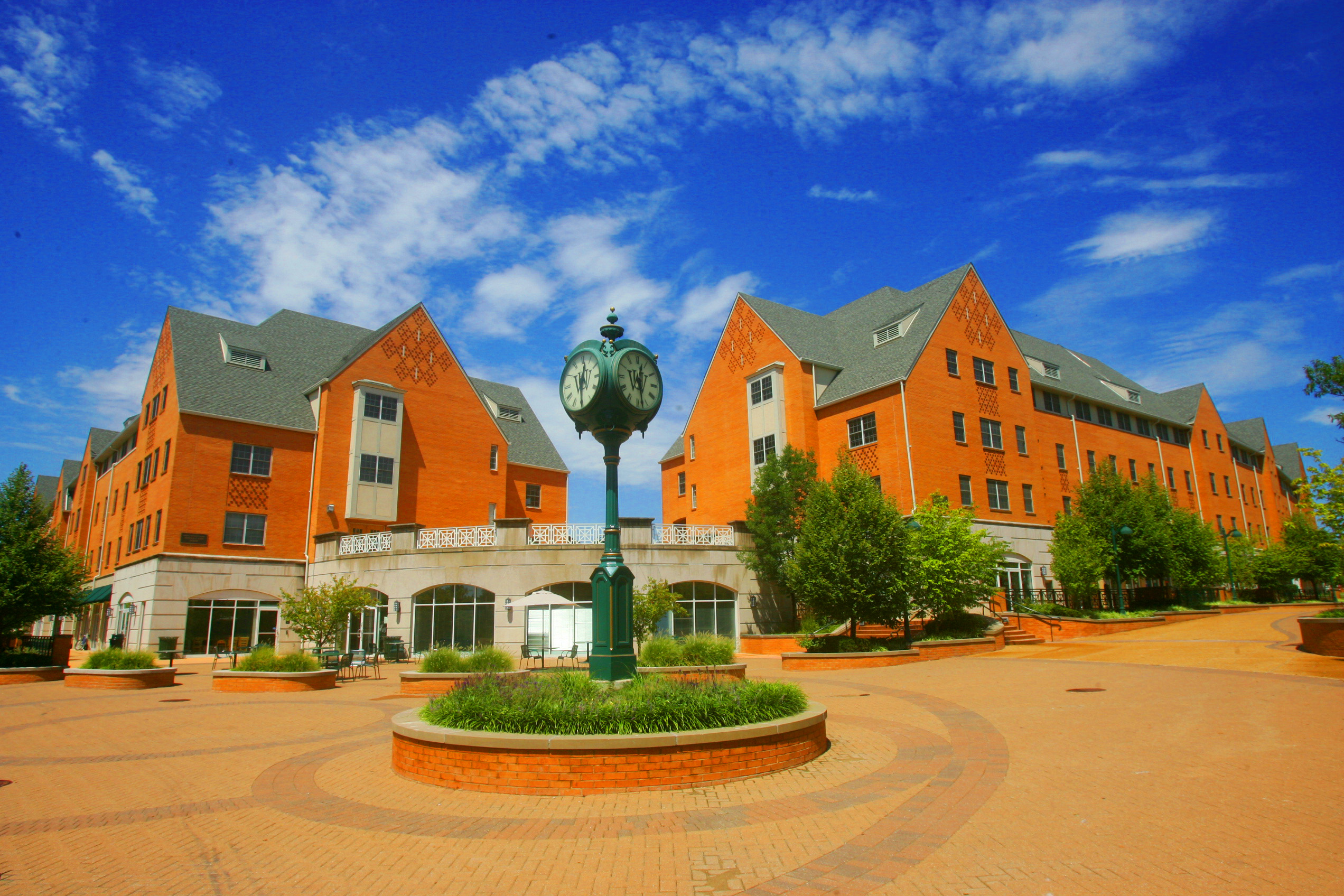
The South 40 in 2008.

Comprising 10 residential colleges and 23 residence halls, the South 40 serves as the primary housing area for first- and second-year undergraduate students. It is named for its location south of the Danforth Campus and its size of 40 acres (16 ha). It includes Bear's Den (the largest dining hall on campus), Bear Necessities (a gift shop), Paws and Go (a convenience store), the Student Health Center, student businesses, meeting rooms, and sports fields.

The Village is a residential area on the Danforth Campus for undergraduate students in their third year or beyond. It includes two suite-style buildings, Lopata House and Village House, that contain multiple four-person single suites, each with two shared bathrooms.

=== Student media ===
Washington University is home to seven student-run media organizations: The Hatchet, Law Review, Washington University Political Review, Student Life, Spires, KWUR 90.3FM, and WUTV. Student Life was founded in January 1878 and is published twice weekly by Washington University Student Media, Inc., an independent nonprofit incorporated in 1999. KWUR (90.3 FM) serves as the students' official radio station. In 2003, KWUR won the critic's choice from the Riverfront Times for the Best Radio Station in St. Louis. WUTV is the university's closed-circuit television channel. It was founded in 1976.

=== Transportation ===
Since 2006, the university has offered free MetroLink (St. Louis's light rail commuter train system) passes to all full-time students, benefits-eligible faculty and staff, and full-time employees of qualified service providers. The Blue Line and the Red Line are on the Danforth Campus along Forest Park Parkway. The Red Line provides access to the St. Louis Lambert International Airport, University of Missouri–St. Louis and the Delmar Loop. The Blue Line provides access to the suburbs of Clayton, Brentwood, and Richmond Heights. Both provide access to the Gateway Arch (U.S. National Historic Landmark in downtown St. Louis) and access to the city of Fairview Heights, Illinois.

The Washington University shuttle system includes a Campus Circulator (which provides free transportation around Danforth Campus for faculty, staff, students and guests) and seven neighborhood routes that go to locations outside of Danforth Campus. In 2025, the Shopper Shuttle was introduced as a pilot program. The Shopper Shuttle provides transportation to Saint Louis Galleria (a shopping mall), Target, and Walmart.

=== Traditions ===
Every semester, Washington University hosts WILD, a concert in the Quad that features popular musical acts. Other traditions include Thurtene Carnival (a student-run carnival), Vertigo (a dance party put on by the Engineering School Council), and Residential Community Olympics (an annual competition between residential colleges featuring different sports and activities). Students also use the Underpass panels, a series of displays along the walls of the underpass connecting the South 40 to the main Danforth Campus, to advertise events.

A superstition among students warns that stepping on the university seal at Brookings Hall will prevent one from graduating on time.

== Athletics ==
Washington University was a founding member of the University Athletic Association of NCAA Division III and previously was a founding member of the Missouri Valley Conference. It is also a member of the College Conference of Illinois and Wisconsin.

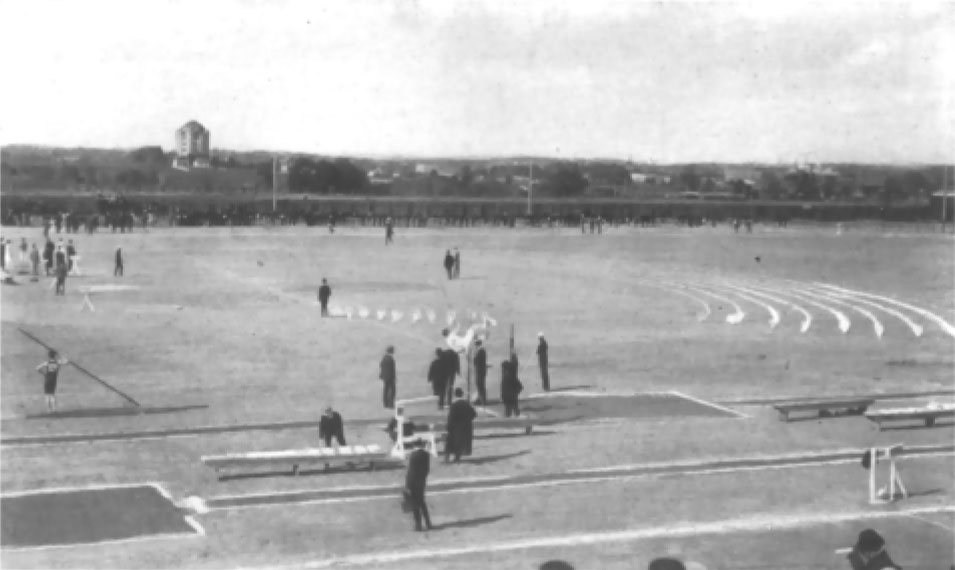
Francis Olympic Field during the 1904 St. Louis Olympics

The Bears have won 28 NCAA Division III championships—ten in volleyball (1989, 1991–1996, 2003, 2007, 2009), five in women's basketball (1998–2001, 2010), two in men's basketball (2008, 2009), two in women's cross country (2011, 2018), two in women's outdoor track and field (2017, 2024), three in women's soccer (2016, 2024, 2025), one in men's tennis (2008), one in women's tennis (2025) one in women's indoor track and field (2017), and one in men's indoor track and field (2022) – and 267 conference titles. Its mascot is a bear named Forest, and its official colors are red and green.

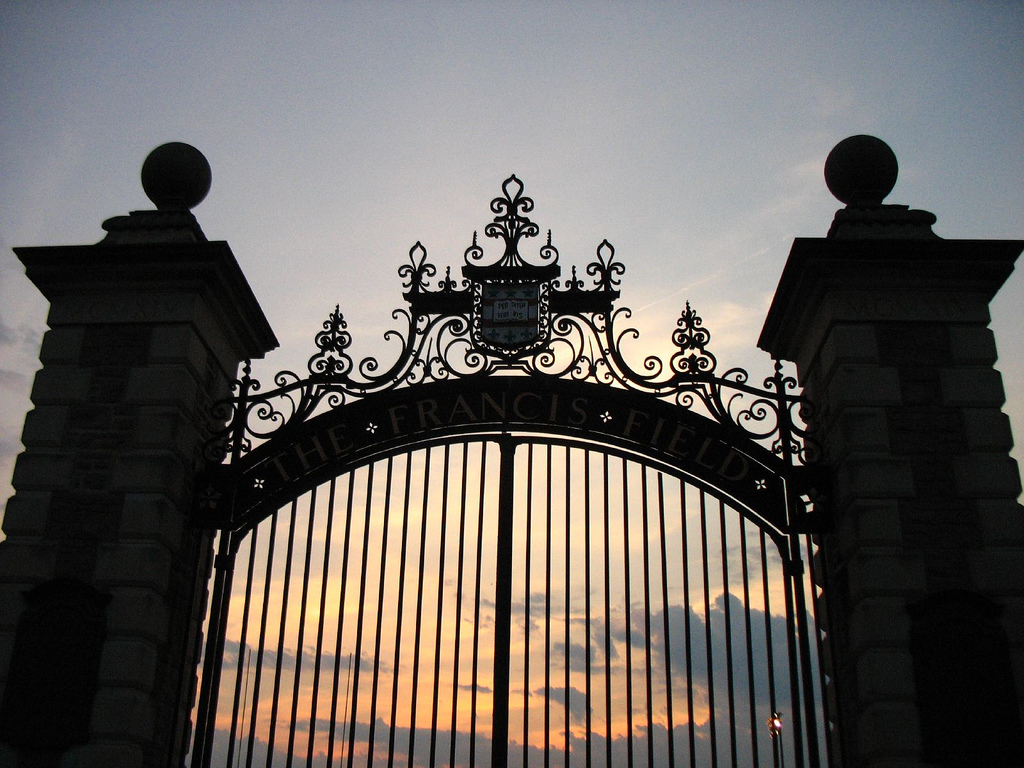
Gates at Francis Olympic Field

Washington University hosts more than 40 club sports.

=== Francis Olympic Field ===
Francis Olympic Field, formerly known as Francis Field, is home to Washington University's football, soccer, and track-and-field teams. It served as a venue for the 1904 Summer Olympics, the first Games held outside of Europe. In 2019, the stadium was renamed Francis Olympic Field to commemorate its Olympic heritage and St. Louis's role as host city. The Olympic flame has passed through the field three times, during torch relays for the 1984 Los Angeles, 1996 Atlanta, and 2004 Athens Summer Olympics.

== Notable people ==
Washington University has more than 166,000 living alumni and 22,530 employees as of Fiscal Year 2024. Of these 22,530 employees, 4,551 are faculty and 17,979 are administrative staff.

As of 2026, 26 Nobel laureates, 12 Pulitzer Prize winners, 4 United States Poets Laureate, and 6 MacArthur Fellows have been affiliated with the university as faculty or alumni. Its alumni and faculty have received numerous other prestigious awards and honors, including the National Book Award, National Book Critics Circle Award, National Medal of Science, National Medal of Arts, Guggenheim Fellowship, Fulbright Fellowship, and Putnam Fellowship, along with memberships in the National Academy of Sciences, National Academy of Engineering, Royal Society of London, American Institute of Architects, American Institute for Medical and Biological Engineering, American Academy of Arts and Letters, American Association for the Advancement of Science, American Law Institute, American Philosophical Society, National Academy of Medicine, and the American Academy of Arts and Sciences.

Washington University alumni also include 17 university presidents, 21 members of the United States Congress, 30 Rhodes Scholars, 20 Truman Scholars, 7 Marshall Scholars and 2 Churchill Scholars.

=== Alumni ===
In the sciences, alumni include Nobel laureates such as Earl Sutherland, Edwin Krebs and Daniel Nathans, all in physiology or medicine. Other notable scientists include J. C. R. Licklider (pioneer in the development of computing and the Internet), Julian W. Hill (discoverer of nylon), Clyde Cowan (co-discoverer of the neutrino) and Bob Behnken (NASA astronaut and former Chief of the Astronaut Office).

In politics and public service, alumni include William H. Webster (the only person to serve as director of both the FBI and CIA), Rochelle Walensky (Director of the Centers for Disease Control and Prevention), and Clark Clifford (political advisor to presidents Truman, Kennedy, Johnson, and Carter). Others include Jim Talent (former U.S. senator from Missouri), Alan J. Dixon (former U.S. senator from Illinois), Alexander M. Dockery (Governor of Missouri), Siniša Mali (finance minister of Serbia), Jonathan Mann (first director of the World Health Organization's Global Program on AIDS), and Phoebe Couzins (first female U.S. Marshal in the U.S.).

In business and entrepreneurship, alumni include Avram Glazer (executive co-chairman of Manchester United), Jim McKelvey (co-founder of Square Inc), Arnold W. Donald (president and chief executive officer of Carnival Corporation), and Charles Nagel (founder of the U.S. Chamber of Commerce).

In the arts, media and performing arts, alumni include Harold Ramis (Ghostbusters, Groundhog Day and Animal House), Peter Sarsgaard (award-winning actor), Robert Guillaume (Emmy-winning actor in Benson, first African American to play the title role in Phantom of the Opera, and voice of Rafiki in Disney's The Lion King), Dave Garroway (founding host of NBC's Today), and Steven Sater (Tony Award, Grammy Award, and Laurence Olivier Award-winning American poet and playwright). Literary and cultural figures include Fannie Hurst (prolific novelist), Dan Simmons (Hugo Award winner), A.E. Hotchner (playwright and novelist), and V.E Schwab (prolific novelist).

In architecture, George Hellmuth, Gyo Obata, and George Kassabaum founded HOK, one of the world's largest architectural firms.

Higher-education leaders include Abram L. Sachar (founding president of Brandeis University) and Thomas Lamb Eliot (founder of Reed College). Alumni also include the former presidents of Johns Hopkins, Clemson, Wake Forest, Morehouse, Florida A&M University, Hong Kong University of Science and Technology, University of Louisville, San Francisco State University, and University of California.

Notable individuals who attended but did not graduate include Tennessee Williams (a renowned playwright who left after a prize dispute), Robert Culp (I Spy, Everybody Loves Raymond), and Marilyn vos Savant (IQ-record holder who pursued family business interests).

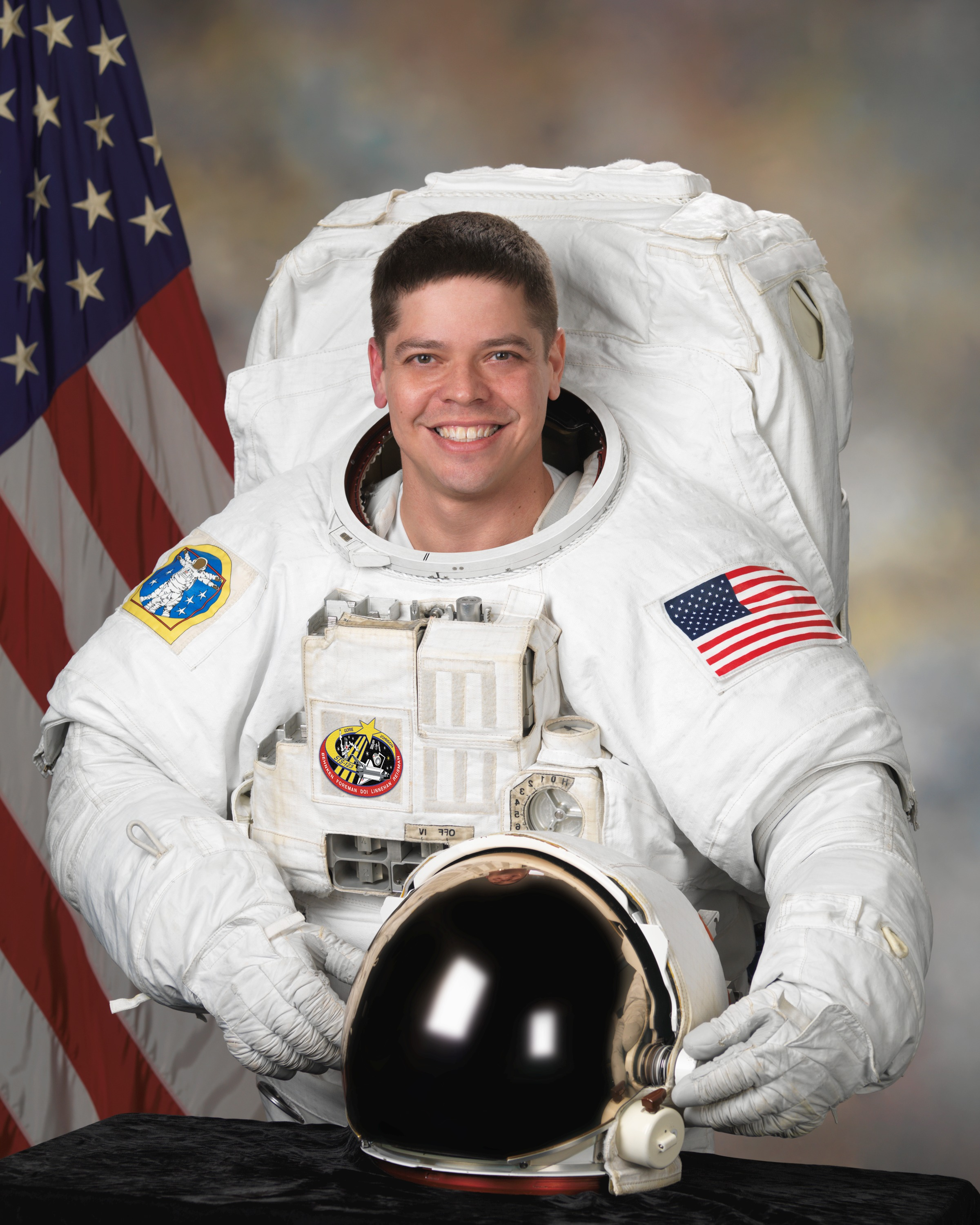
Bob Behnken

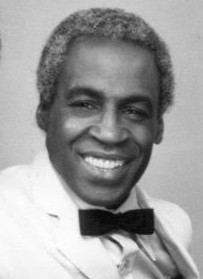
Robert Guillaume

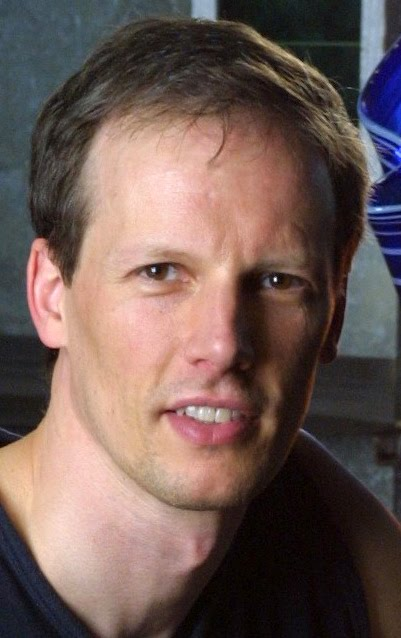
Jim McKelvey

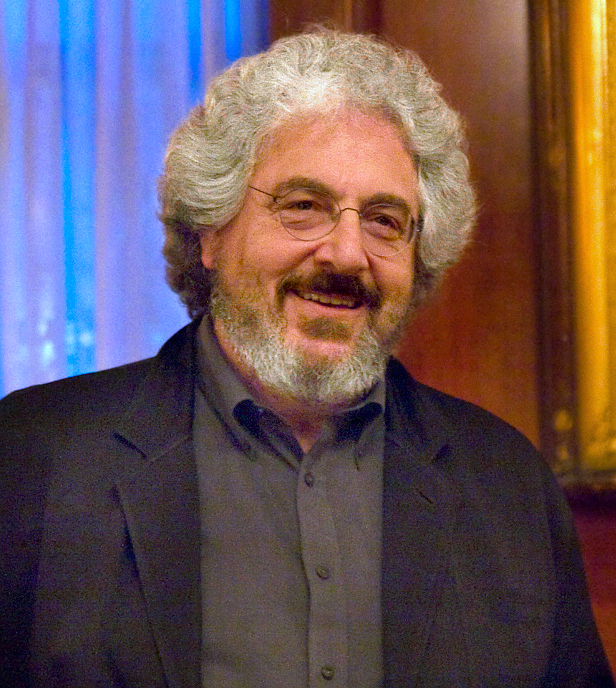
Harold Ramis

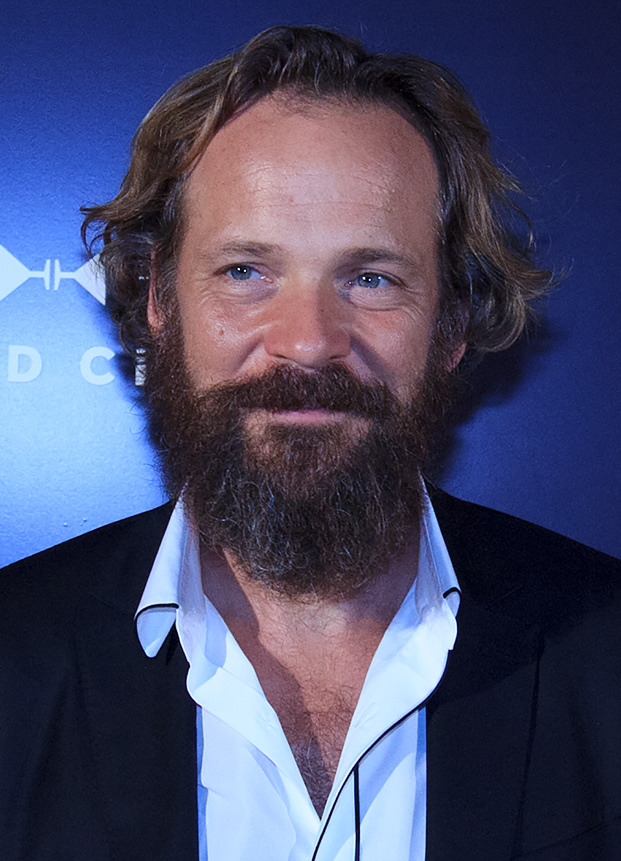
Peter Sarsgaard

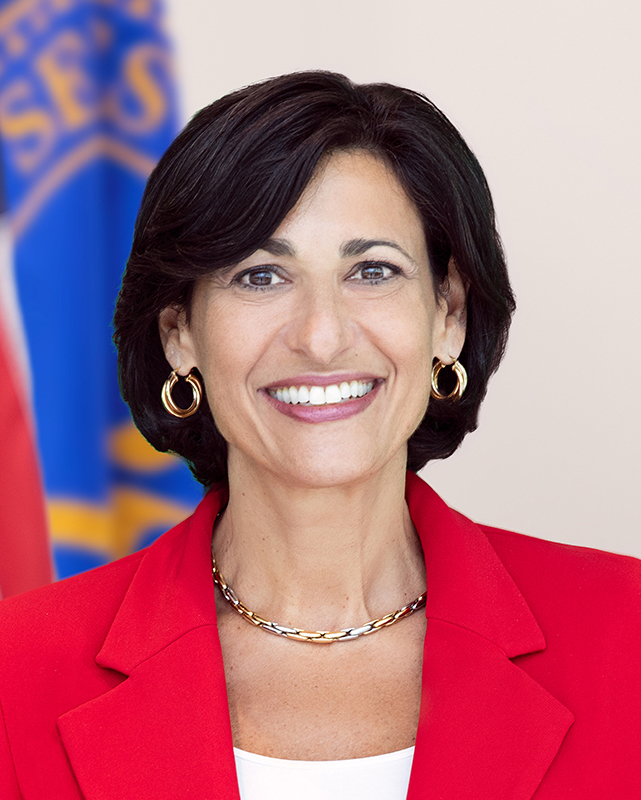
Rochelle Walensky

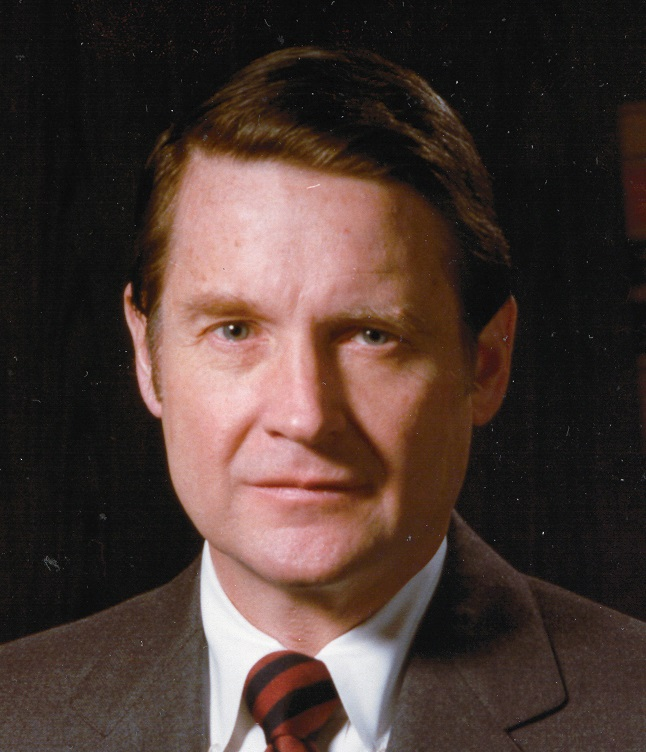
William H. Webster

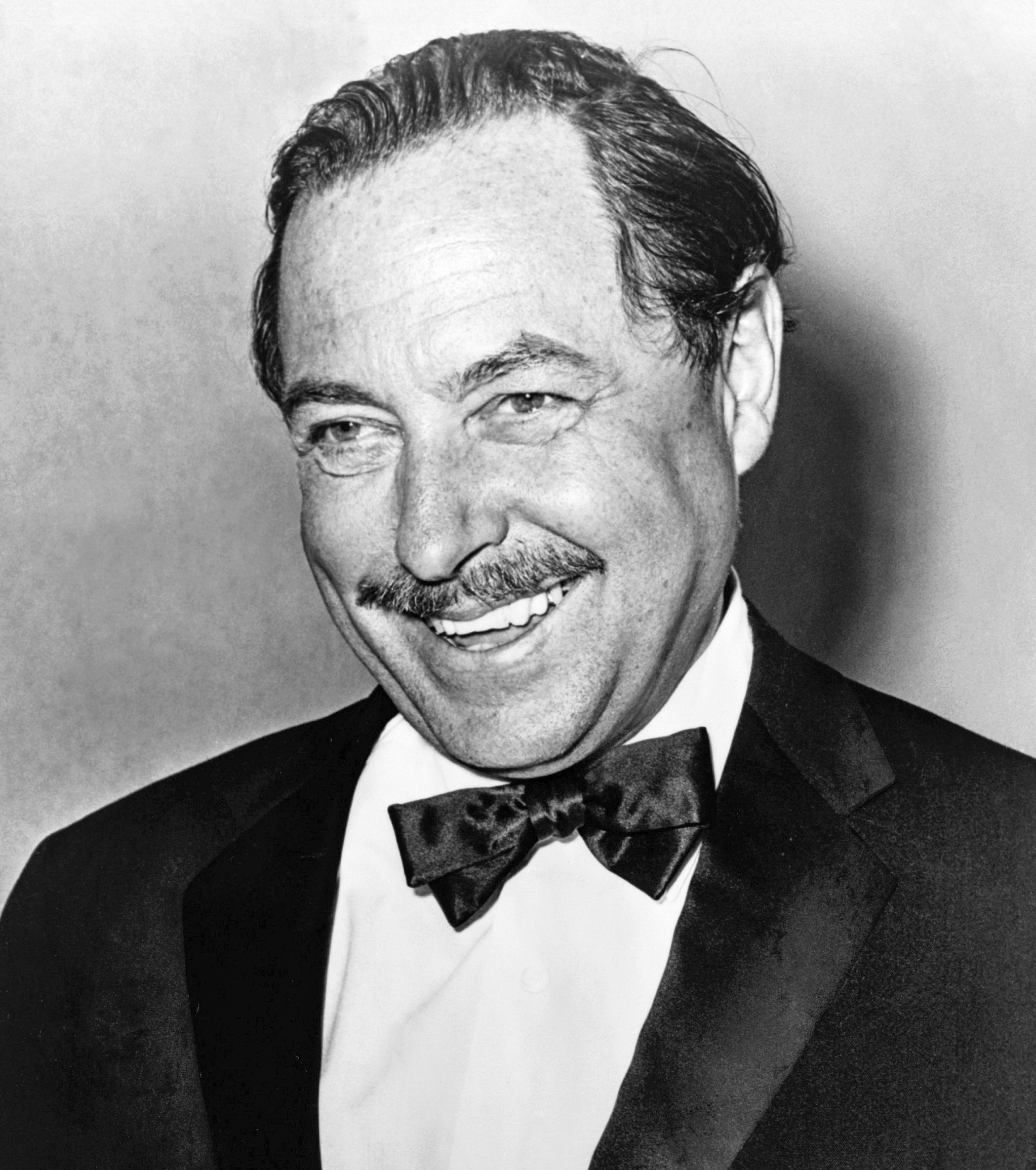
Tennessee Williams

=== Faculty ===
Notable faculty at Washington University have included Roger Nash Baldwin (American Civil Liberties Union cofounder and Washington University's first instructor in sociology), Gerty Cori (the first woman Nobel laureate in Physiology/Medicine), Rita Levi-Montalcini (Nobel laureate, co-discover of nerve growth factor), Peter Mutharika (President of Malawi), William Inge (Playwright, Pulitzer Prize for drama in 1953), Arthur Oncken Lovejoy (founded the American Association of University Professors), Mona Van Duyn (Pulitzer Prize winner, National Book Award winner and first woman U.S. Poet Laureate), Howard Nemorov (U.S. Poet Laureate, National Medal of Arts recipient, Bollingen Prize winner), Joseph W. Kennedy (co-discoverer of the element plutonium), Barbara A. Schaal (first woman VP of National Academy of Sciences), Henry Smith Pritchett (Head of the Carnegie Foundation for the Advancement of Teaching), Virginia E. Johnson (co-author of Human Sexual Response), and Thomas Eagleton (United States senator from Missouri).

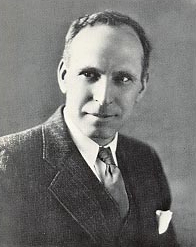
Roger Nash Baldwin

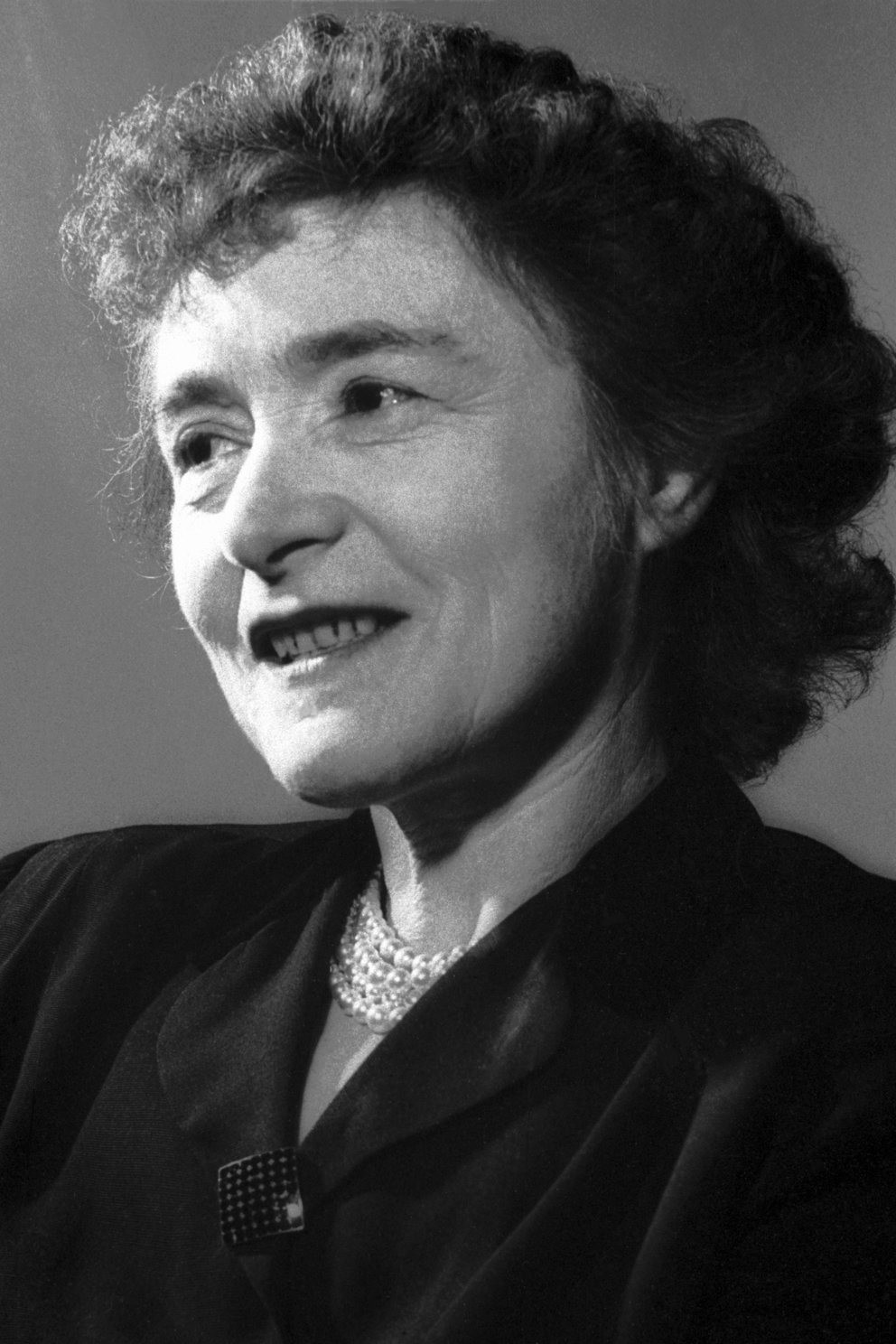
Gerty Cori

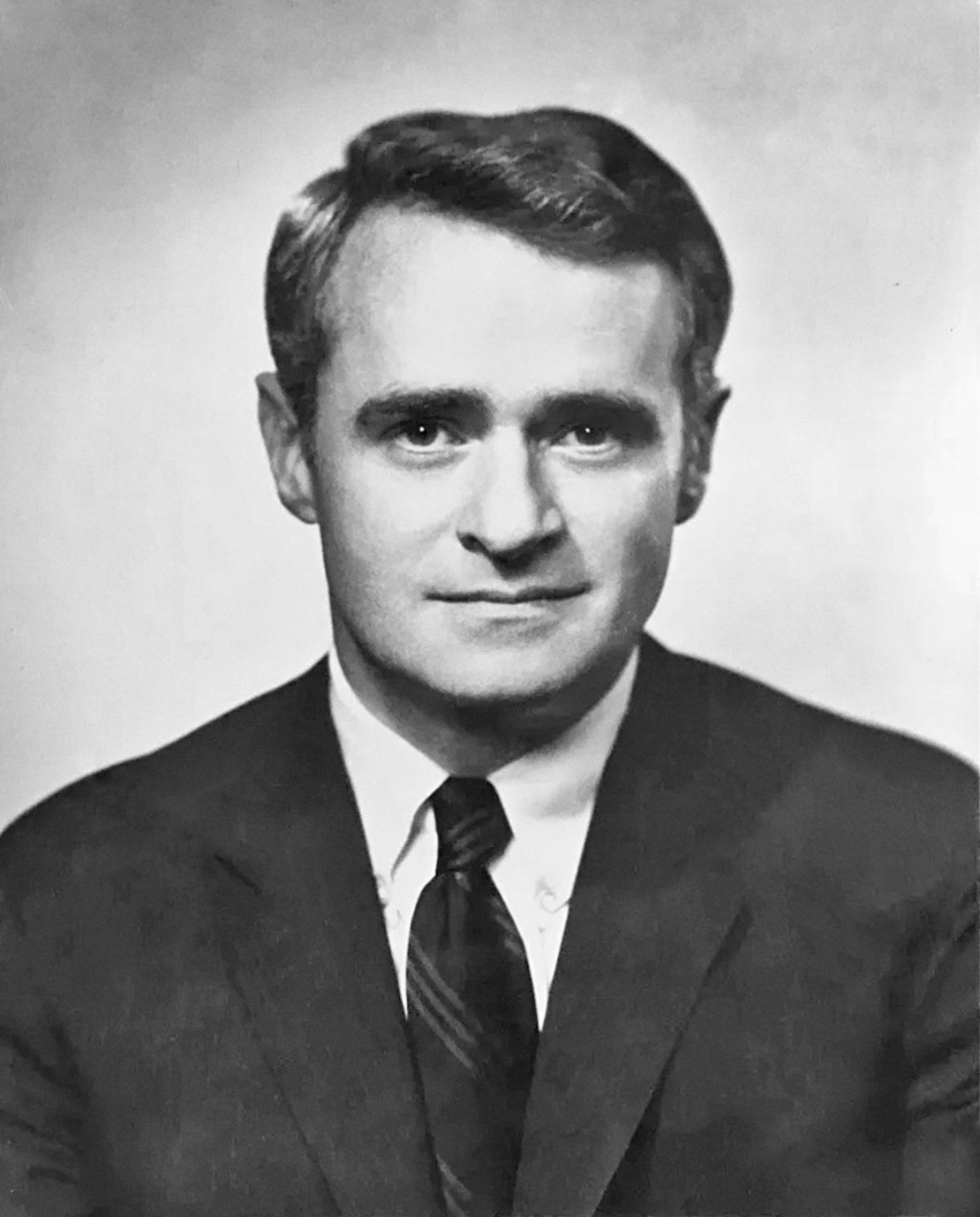
Thomas Eagleton

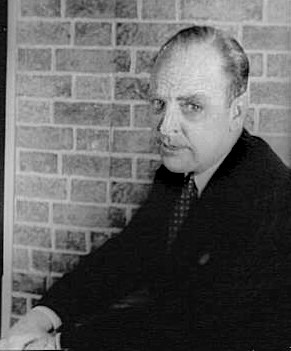
William Inge

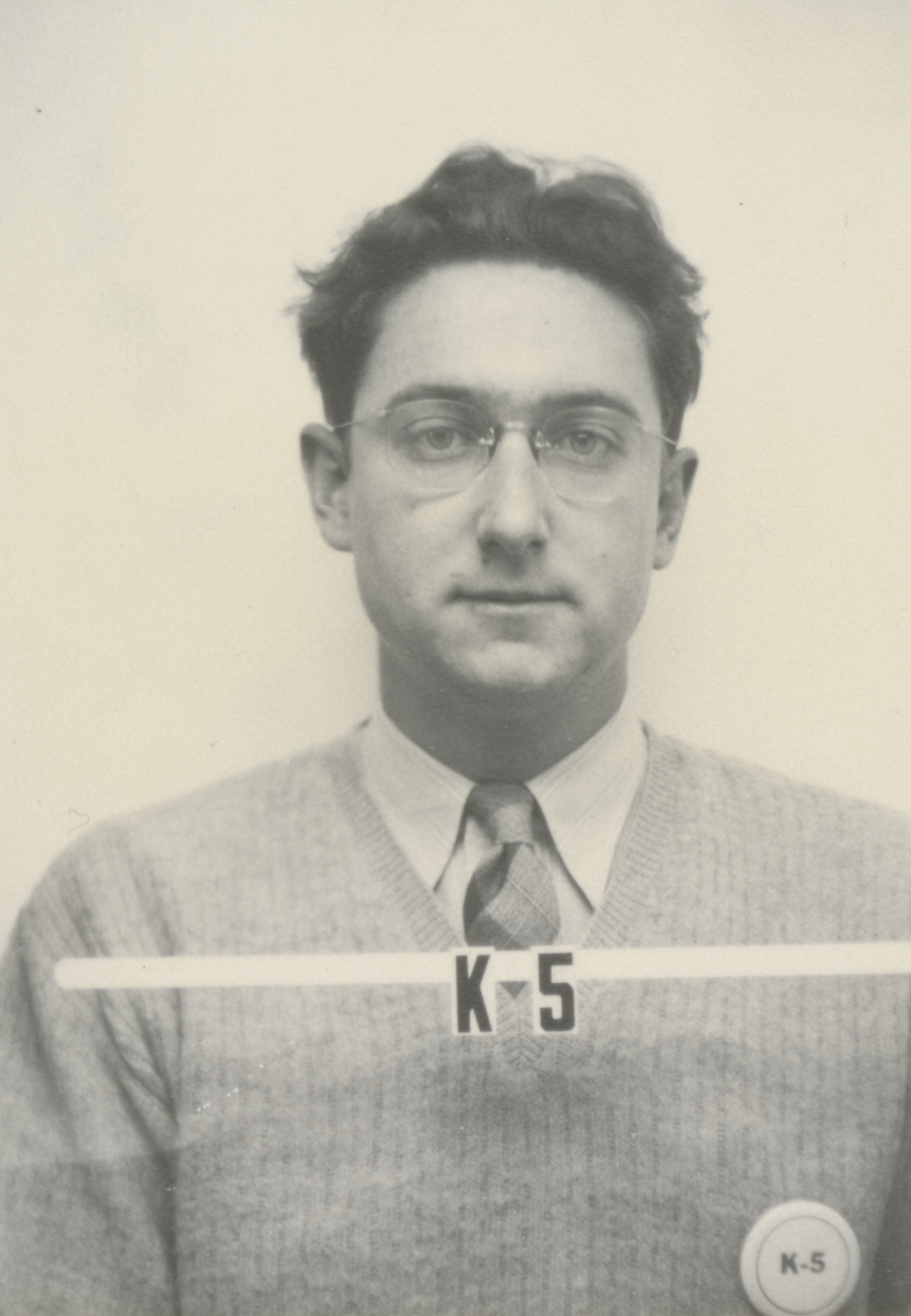
Joseph W. Kennedy

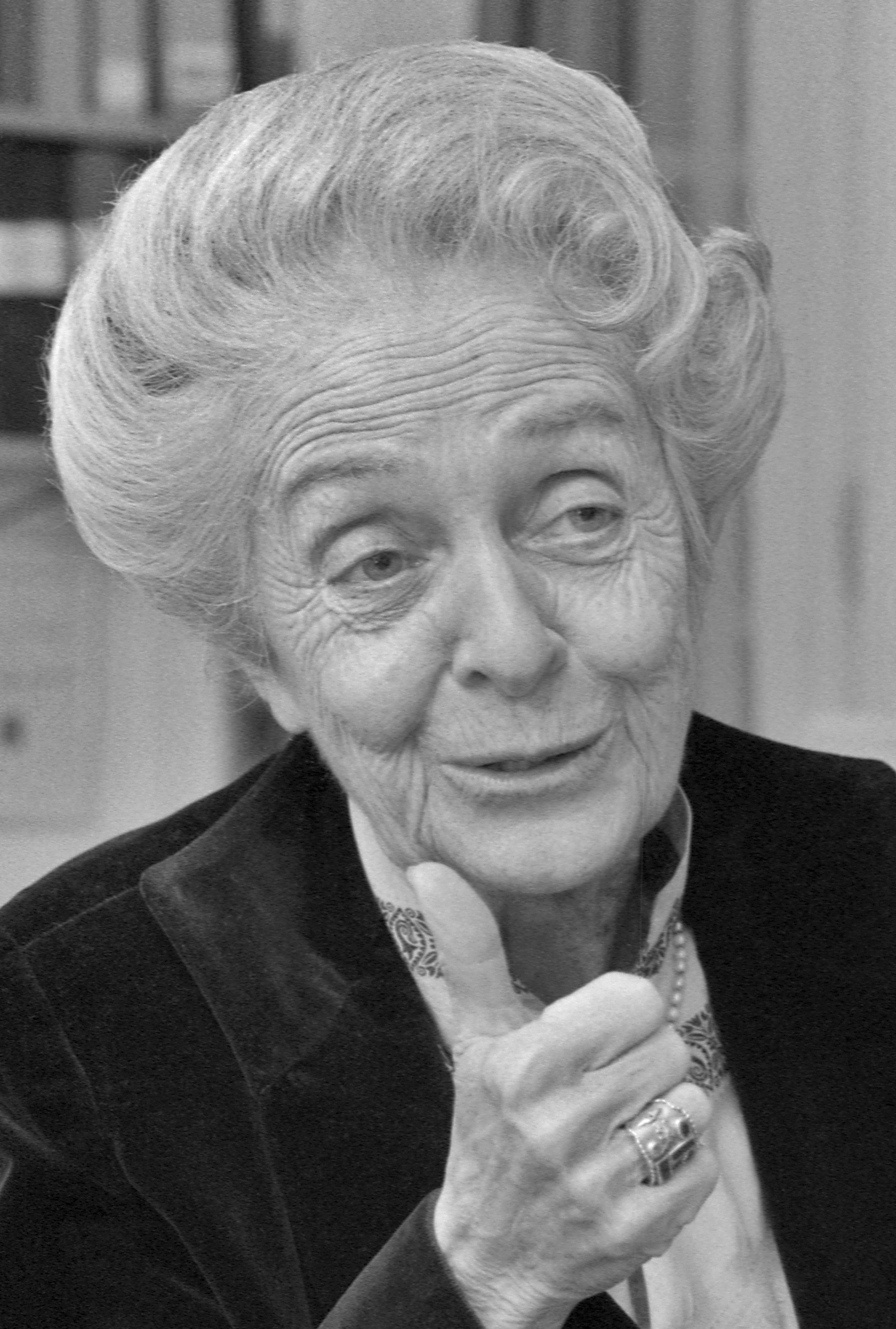
Rita Levi-Montalcini

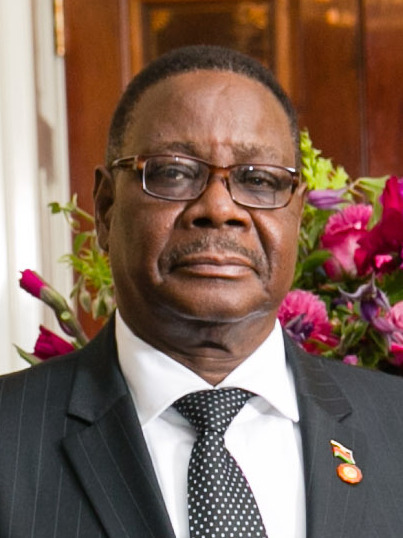
Peter Mutharika

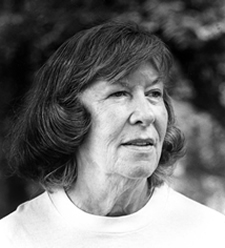
Mona Van Duyn

== See also ==
- Center for Social Development
- Central Institute for the Deaf
- Crow Observatory
- Tyson Research Center
- Washington University School of Dental Medicine
- Whitney R. Harris World Law Institute

== Sources ==
- O'Connor, Candice (2003). Beginning a Great Work: Washington University in St. Louis, 1853–2003. Washington University in St. Louis. ISBN 978-0972096645.
- Morrow, Ralph E. (1996). Washington University in St. Louis: a history (1st ed.). St. Louis: Missouri Historical Society Press. ISBN 978-1-883982-10-2.
