= Danforth Campus =

Main campus of Washington University in St. Louis

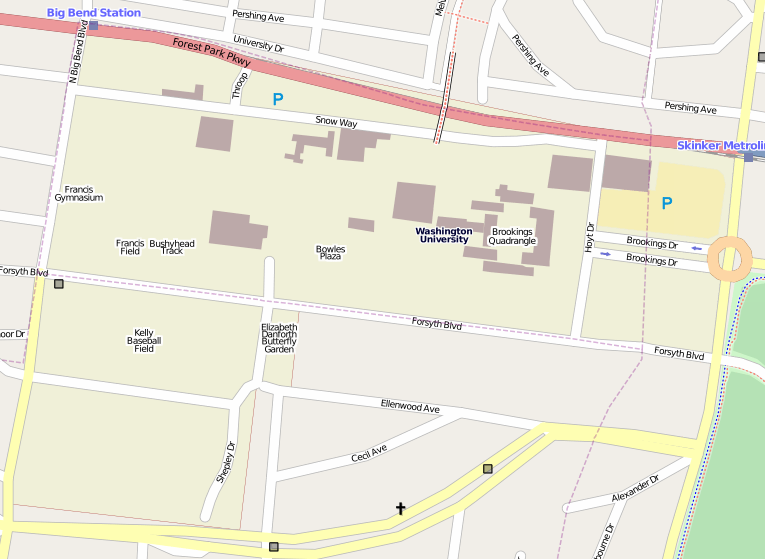
- Interactive map of the Danforth Campus area

General information
- Architectural style: Collegiate gothic
- Location: St. Louis County (including Clayton) and St. Louis City.
- Coordinates: 38°38′53″N 90°18′18″W
- Named for: Danforth Foundation, Dr. William H. Danforth
- Completed: 1902
- Owner: Washington University in St. Louis

Design and construction
- Architects: Cope & Stewardson; Frederick Law Olmsted; Skidmore, Owings & Merrill; Fumihiko Maki

Website
- www.wustl.edu

The Danforth Campus is the main campus at Washington University in St. Louis. Formerly known as the Hilltop Campus, it was officially dedicated as the Danforth Campus on September 17, 2006, in honor of William H. Danforth, the 13th chancellor of the university, the Danforth family and the Danforth Foundation. Distinguished by its collegiate gothic architecture, the 169-acre (68 ha) campus lies at the western boundary of Forest Park, partially in the City of St. Louis.

Most of the campus (including almost all academic and administrative buildings) is in a small enclave of unincorporated St. Louis County, while eastern parts are in St. Louis City. All the campus area south of Forsyth Boulevard (mostly student housing; the South 40 Campus and the former Fontbonne University), is in suburban Clayton.

== History ==
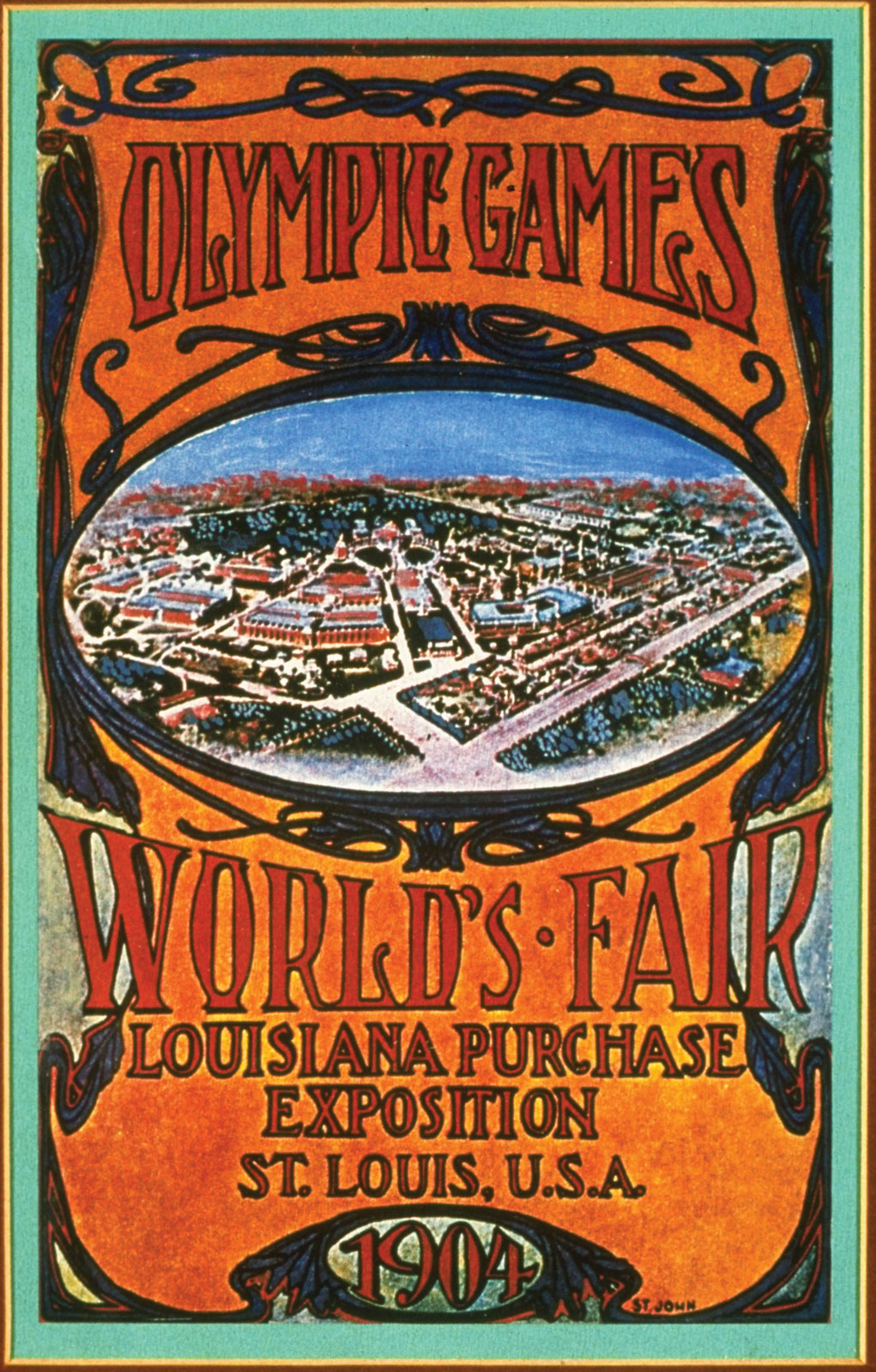
Washington University was the site of the Games of the III Olympiad.

The construction of Danforth Campus was accelerated through a profitable lease of several buildings to the 1904 St. Louis World's Fair. During the fair, Brookings Hall, Busch Hall, Cupples I & II Halls, Francis Field & Gymnasium (site of the 1904 Summer Olympics), Ridgley Hall, Eads Hall, and Prince Hall (a men's dormitory) were used as administrative and exhibition spaces. At the fair's conclusion, the newly constructed buildings assumed their original functions as classrooms and administrative offices. Additionally, Francis Field and Gymnasium were converted for use by the Washington University athletic department.

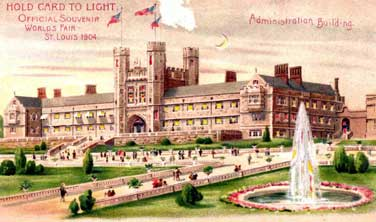
Postcard commemorating the 1904 World's Fair

The landscape design of the Danforth Campus was created in 1895 by Olmsted, Olmsted & Eliot, a firm best known for designing New York City's Central Park. In 1899, after holding a national design competition, Washington University's administrators selected the Philadelphia firm Cope & Stewardson to design the entire campus. Cope & Stewardson, a firm known for its mastery of Collegiate Gothic, designed Brookings Hall as a centerpiece of a new campus plan. The plan, modeled after the distinctive quadrangles of Oxford and Cambridge Universities, has guided the construction and expansion of the Danforth Campus to the present day.

In 1922, Arthur Holly Compton, a physics professor, conducted a series of experiments in the basement of Eads Hall that demonstrated the particle concept of electromagnetic radiation. Compton's discovery, known as the "Compton Effect," earned him the Nobel Prize in physics in 1927.

A large portion of the Danforth Campus is recognized as the Washington University Hilltop Campus Historic District, which achieved National Historic Landmark status in 1987.

In the summer of 2002, Brookings Hall Room 300 was transformed into the Mission Control center for Steve Fossett's sixth and ultimately successful attempt to circumnavigate the planet in a balloon—the Spirit of Freedom.

In 2019, a $360 million renovation project, called the "East End Transformation", was unveiled on the Danforth Campus, building on the original 1895 campus plan by Olmsted, Olmsted & Eliot. The project included the creation of the Gary M. Sumers Welcome Center, which now houses undergraduate admissions; the Craig and Nancy Schnuck Pavilion, which houses a café, the Environmental Studies program, and the Office of Sustainability; the Henry A. and Elvira H. Jubel Hall, which houses the Department of Mechanical Engineering & Materials Science in the McKelvey School of Engineering; and the James M. McKelvey, Sr. Hall, which will be completed in 2020 and open in 2021 and will house the McKelvey School of Engineering's Department of Computer Science & Engineering. All new buildings on the east end have been designed to achieve LEED-Gold certification and include solar panels on many of the roofs to generate renewable electricity. In addition to the five new buildings, the project relocated six acres of parking lots underground, renovated and expanded the Mildred Lane Kemper Art Museum, and created the Ann and Andrew Tisch Park.

== Student organizations ==
Washington University has over 300 registered undergraduate student organizations on campus. All are funded by WUSTL's student government, the Washington University Student Union, which has an approximately $3.6 million annual budget that is completely student controlled and is one of the largest student government budgets in the country. Known as SU for short, it sponsors large-scale campus programs including WILD (a semesterly concert in the quad), free copies of The New York Times, USA Today, and the St. Louis Post-Dispatch through The Collegiate Readership Program; the Assembly Series, a weekly lecture series; and the campus television station, WUTV and the radio station, KWUR and Filmboard. The Office of Student Activities provides advisors, leadership training, counseling, and other support to the student groups on campus.

The university is home to one of the largest collegiate Relay For Life in the country, raising over $200,000 last year in total donations. Additionally, there are over 50 community service groups on campus such as a Habitat for Humanity Campus Chapter.

There are 10 national fraternities and 8 national sororities on campus; there are also 8 national black Greek organizations which have citywide St. Louis chapters. 9 of the fraternities have houses on the Danforth Campus, while none of the sororities have houses by their own accord. Greek Organizations are governed by the principles of Arete, which focuses on Integrity, Loyalty, Philanthropy, Responsibility, Friendship, and Intellectual Curiosity.

=== Washington University Student Union ===
The Washington University Student Union is the undergraduate student government of Washington University in St. Louis. Founded in 1967, Student Union carries out three major activities: representing student interests; registering, funding, and supporting student groups; and planning campus-wide events. It is divided into three branches: the Executive, Legislative, and Judicial branches. The Student Union Executive Branch comprises 5 elected individuals, who are the student body officials - the President, Vice President of Administration, Vice President of Finance, Vice President of Programming, and Vice President of Public Relations - who are charged with managing and allocating the budget, being the point of contact with University administration, and leading and setting the direction for Student Union. The Legislative branch includes the Treasury and the Senate. The Treasury of the Student Union hears appeals for finances from various student groups. Approximately 300 student groups on campus are registered SU groups, utilizing a large portion of the over $2 million budget. Recent resolutions of the Senate include improving Wi-Fi capabilities, improving relations between Alumni & Development and the Career Center, adding new capabilities to student ID cards, forming a LGBTQA task force, requiring all professors to distribute course syllabi and midterm grade progresses, and increasing the minimum wage of university workers. The SU Judicial Branch includes a Constitutional Council comprising a Chief Justice, four Associate Justices, and one Alternate. The Election Commissioners also fall under the Judicial Branch of Student Union. SU also publishes Bearings, the unofficial student handbook, and its supplemental website.

=== Music ===
There is a large interest in A cappella music on campus, spawning groups such as After Dark, The Amateurs, The Aristocats, Deliverance, The Ghost Lights, The Greenleafs, More Fools Than Wise], The Mosaic Whispers, The Pikers, SensAsian, Staam, The Stereotypes, and Sur Awaaz. An umbrella organization known as ACAC (A Cappella Advisory Council) oversees auditions for its member groups each fall. Many of these groups are continually selected for national collegiate a cappella compilations, such as BOCA and Voices Only. The Stereotypes have also made it to the top 8 groups of the Midwest for the past three consecutive years in the International Championship of Collegiate A Cappella and represented the Midwest as its sole competitor at the International Competition at Lincoln Center in 2011 where they placed 4th and received the award for Outstanding Arrangement.

Another student-run music group, the Wash U Pops Orchestra (a.k.a. "WU Pops"), was founded in the '07-'08 school year in the spirit of traditional pops orchestras. It has grown significantly enough since founding to have spawned two chamber groups. The full orchestra performs at least once a semester, with the chamber groups performing many smaller gigs both on and off campus.

The university also has a Department of Music that, in addition to providing concentrated study for music majors, also provides instrument and voice lessons to students. There are also a number of instrumental groups and ensembles in which students may participate.

Other student organizations, such as the Social Programming Board bring in popular musical acts for Walk In Lay Down and lesser-known independent performers. Recent WILD performers include Karmin, Chance the Rapper, Wolfgang Gartner, and Matt Kearney.

== Campus buildings ==
Most of the buildings built between 1902 and the 1950s were designed by Cope and Stewardson and Jamieson and Spearl. James P. Jamieson was the chief architect for those built before 1940.

=== Arts and Sciences ===
- Adolphus Busch Hall – Named for Adolphus Busch, co-founder of Anheuser-Busch, the building was the first to go under construction on the Danforth Campus, its cornerstone being laid in 1900. Busch Hall served as the Chemistry Building from 1902 until 1950. It was then remodeled into a humanities building, which it currently serves as today. Busch Hall was recently renovated and reopened June 15, 2009.

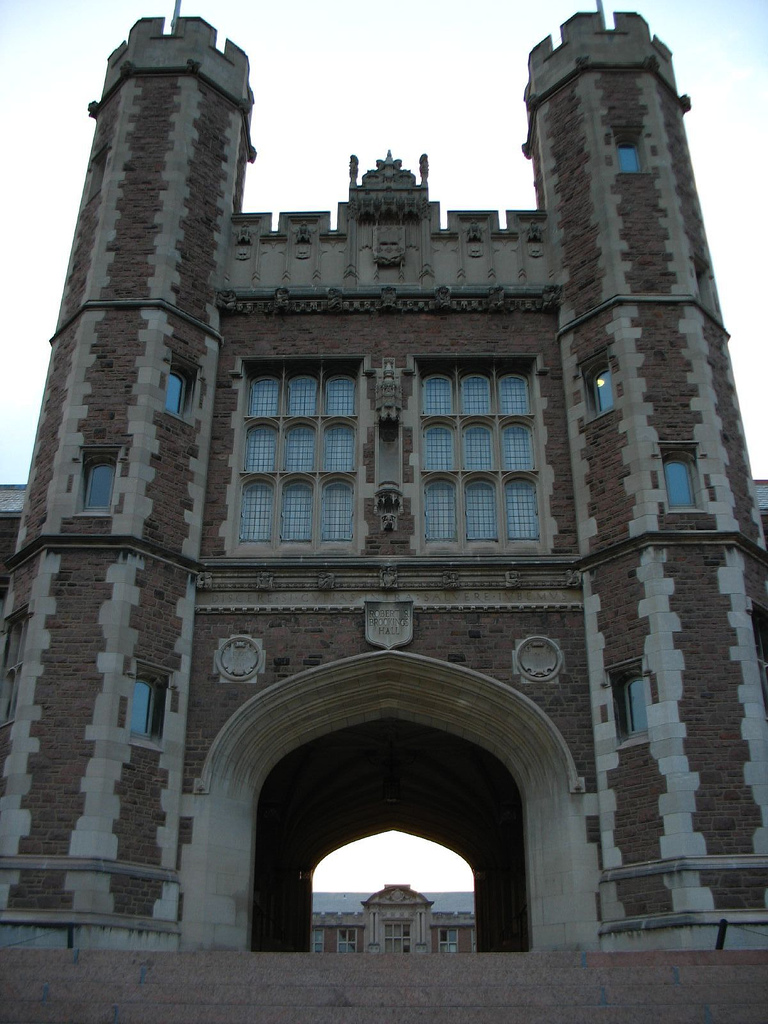
Brookings Hall, frequently an icon for the university, houses administrative offices.

- Beaumont Pavilion – An outdoor stage that sits in front of Cupples I. It was built in 1965 and named after Louis D. Beaumont. The stage is used for annual commencement ceremonies, the semesterly W.I.L.D. concert, and other outdoor theater productions and concerts.
- Brookings Hall – The hallmark of Washington University. Named after Robert S. Brookings, it was completed in 1902 and served as the administrative center for the 1904 World's Fair. Today, it serves as the university's administrative center. South Brookings houses the Admissions Office and the Administrative offices for the College of Arts and Sciences. North Brookings houses the office of Student Financial Services, the office of the chancellor, and the graduate school of Arts and Sciences.
- Busch Laboratory – Completed in 1959, the lab was built as an extension of Rebstock Hall. It is only 11,000 square feet (1,000 m^{2}) and three stories high, helping to house the Biology Department.
- Compton Laboratory of Physics – A 65,000-square-foot (6,000 m^{2}), 5 level structure, the Compton Lab was dedicated in 1966. It houses the Department of Physics and the Physics Library.
- Crow Hall – Dedicated in 1934, it is named for Wayman Crow, a founding member of the university. The building is not subject to the Earth's natural vibrations and contains a shaft that expands the full height of the building. It also houses the Department of physics and the historic Crow Observatory.
- Cupples I Hall – This is the first building donated to the university by Samuel Cupples, in 1900. It currently houses the Math Department.
- Duncker Hall – Dedicated in 1923, Duncker Hall housed the School of Commerce and Finance. It is one of the three buildings to have housed the School of Business for over three years (Prince Hall and Simon Hall are the other two). Duncker Hall now houses the English Department.
- Eads Hall – This building was the site of the experimental work that Arthur Holly Compton conducted to win the Nobel Prize in 1927. It went through an extensive renovation in 1998 and today houses the Arts and Sciences Computing Center, the Language and Instructional Media Center, the Teaching Center, and the Writing Center.
- Earth and Planetary Sciences Building – Dedicated in 2004, this building is the new home of the Earth and Planetary Sciences Department.
- Eliot Hall – A concrete building that was dedicated in April 1974. Eliot Hall houses the Departments of History and Religious Studies, along with the Gephardt Institute for Civic and Community Engagement. The Gephardt Institute for Civic and Community Engagement was established in 2005 with significant support from former U.S. Congressman Richard A. Gephardt, who represented Missouri's 3rd Congressional District from 1977 to 2005. Named in his honor following a major gift, the institute advances civic engagement through speaker series internships and career placements, community-based grants, and co-curricular service initiatives.

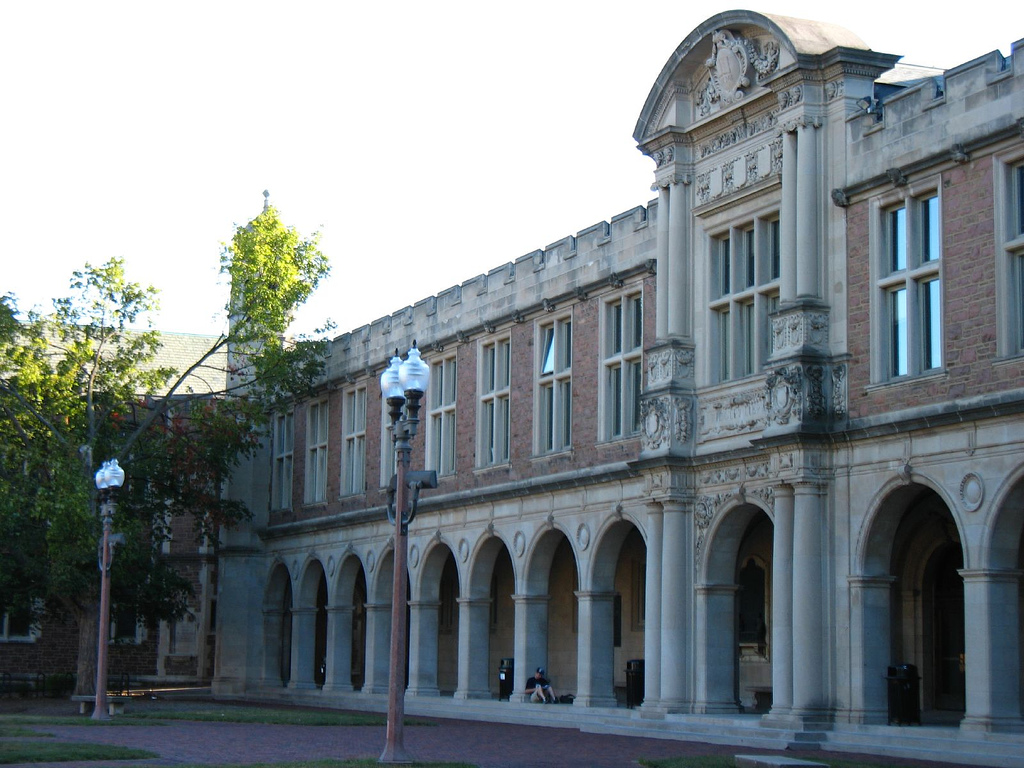
Ridgley Hall

- Goldfarb Plant Growth Facility – Completed in 1988, the facility expands the Biology Department. It contains offices and lab space for biology students and professors, as well as a fully equipped greenhouse for experimental plant growth and research.
- January Hall – Completed in the mid-1920s, January housed the School of Law until the early 70s. It contains an elegant wooden-paneled room which serves as the East Asian Library. Today, January houses the Department of Classics, the Office of University College, the Religious Studies Committee, and the Arts and Sciences Summer School Office.
- Life Sciences Building – Another addition to Rebstock Hall. The building was completed in the mid-1970s and houses the Biology Library and the Natural Science Learning Center.
- Louderman Hall – Louderman Hall was built in the early 1950s to meet the university's needs to support newer research in atomic sciences. Louderman Hall houses the Department of Chemistry as well as the Chemistry Library.
- McDonnell Hall – Dedicated in 1993, McDonnell Hall contains a 150-seat auditorium, and 75 and 85 seat classrooms. It also provides lab and research space for the Departments of Biology, and Earth and Planetary Sciences. The Environmental Studies Program is also housed inside of McDonnell Hall.
- McMillan Hall – Dedicated in 1906, McMillan was the first women's dormitory on the Danforth Campus. In the early 1960s, McMillan Hall was remodeled into an academic building. It now houses the Department of Anthropology, the Committee on Social Thought and Analysis, the Department of Education, and the program of African and African American studies.
- McMillan Laboratory – Completed in 1964, this building also houses the Department of Chemistry. It is connected to Prince Hall by Millstone Lounge.

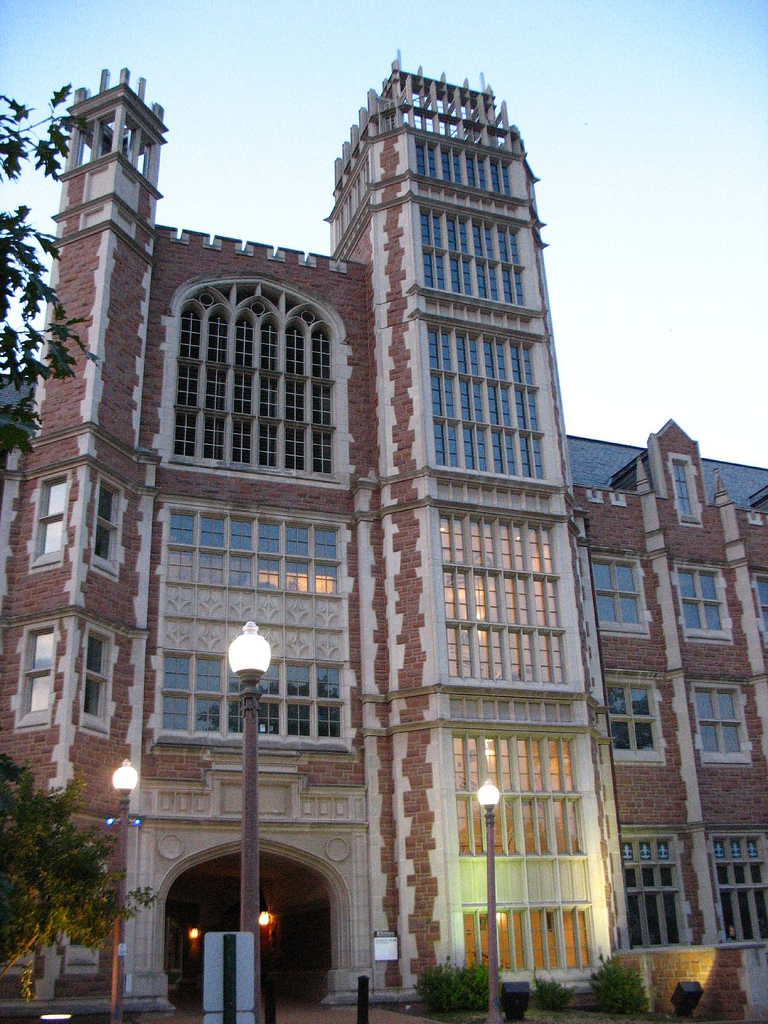
Psychology Building

- Monsanto Laboratory – This lab also houses the Department of Biology.
- Psychology Building – Designed by Skidmore, Owings & Merrill, the Psychology Building was completed in 1994, and has yet to be dedicated. It is 105,000 square feet (9,800 m^{2}) in size and forms a quadrangle with McDonnell Hall, Wilson Hall and Monsanto Lab. Its facade was modeled after the main facade of Brookings Hall. In the summer of 2006, the Psychology Building was extended to include other classroom and office space. It houses the Department of Psychology and the Linguistic Studies Program.
- Rebstock Hall – Dedicated in 1927, this building serves as the central home of the Biology Department.
- Ridgley Hall – This served as the university's first library building until the early 1960s. During the 1904 World's Fair, Ridgley housed an exhibit of Queen Victoria's Diamond Jubilee gifts. The former library reading room was transformed into an ornate lounge space, which today is known as Holmes Lounge. Ridgley Hall is also the home of several language departments, the Committee on Comparative Literature and the Language Lab.
- Seigle Hall – Completed and dedicated in 2008, Seigle Hall is an interdisciplinary endeavor, providing physical space for research centers and institutes, the Departments of Economics, Education, and Political Science, and the School of Law. With 15 classrooms, it is the largest academic classroom building on campus.
- Wilson Hall – This structure was built in 1925 with a mineralogy lab, a petrology lab, and a testing lab for the study of Geology and Geography. The structure was expanded in 1976. It was renovated in the summer of 2006 and now houses the Philosophy Department and a portion of the Biology Department.
- Wrighton Hall (formerly Laboratory Sciences Building) – Dedicated in 2002, this building provides additional lab space for teaching and research for the Chemistry Department. It also features a large 300-seat auditorium. The building was renamed in 2019 in honor of Washington University chancellor Mark S. Wrighton.

=== Sam Fox School of Design and Visual Arts ===
- Bixby Hall – Houses the School of Art
- Givens Hall – Constructed in the 1930s, Givens Hall continues to house the School of Architecture and the Urban Research and Design Center
- Mildred Lane Kemper Art Museum – Completed in 2006, this structure now houses the university's art museum facilities designed by Pritzker Prize-winning architect, and former faculty member, Fumihiko Maki. The art museum was first established in 1881 and was the first art museum west of the Mississippi River.
- Steinberg Hall – Designed by Fumihiko Maki and completed as his first commission in 1960, Steinberg Hall houses the Art and Architecture Library and the Department of Art History and Archeology. Steinberg Hall was renovated in the fall of 2006.
- Walker Hall – Also houses the School of Art

=== Olin Business School ===
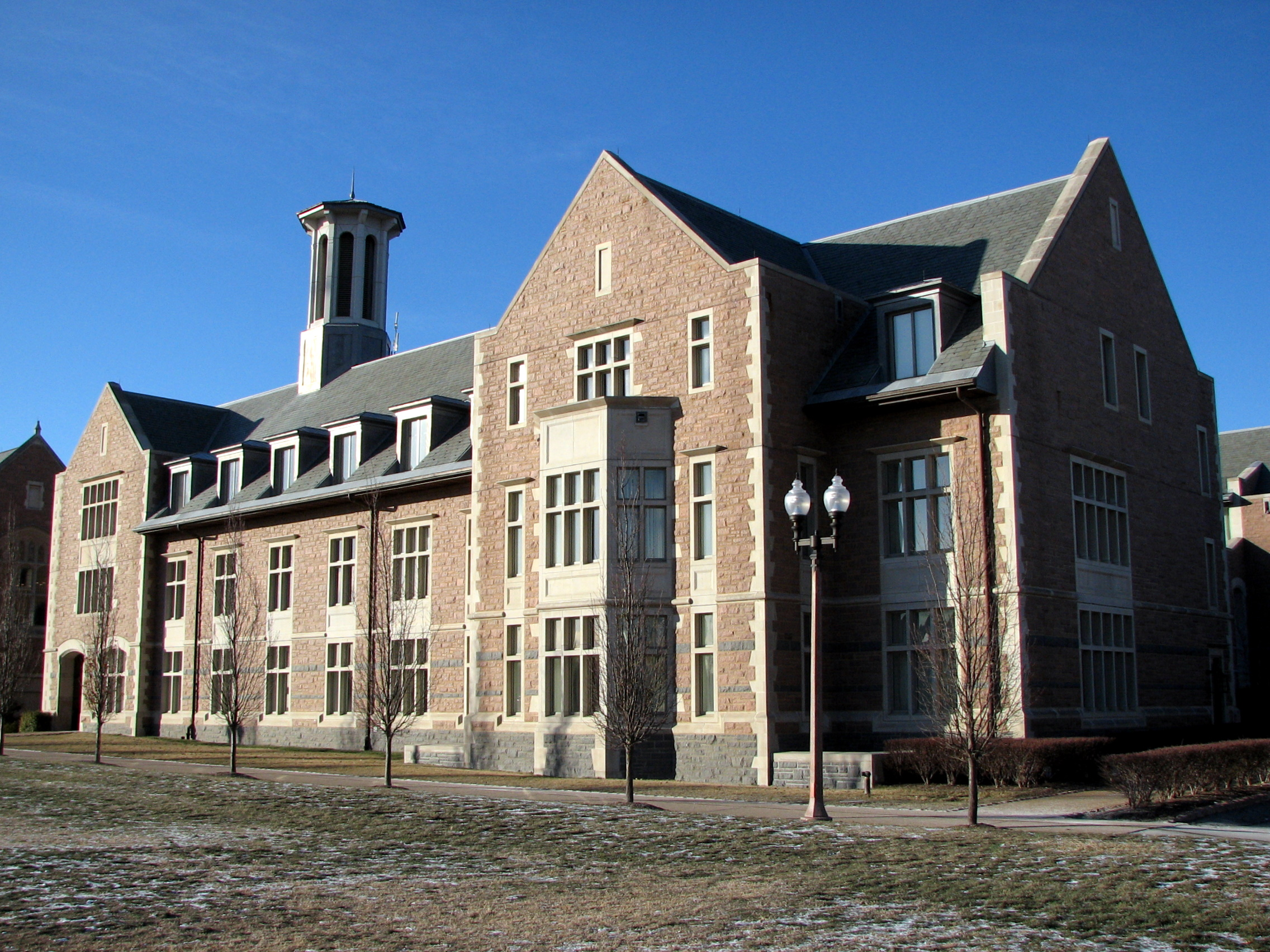
The Knight Center

- Simon Hall – Simon Hall was dedicated in 1986. With 80,000 feet (24,000 m) of usable floor space, it is one of the largest academic buildings on the Danforth Campus. Simon Hall houses the Business Library, the Art and Marge McWilliams Computing Center, and the School of Business.
- Charles F. Knight Executive Education & Conference Center – This center was dedicated in 2001. It is a residential living and learning facility for the Olin Business School. It is 135,000 square feet (12,500 m^{2}) and five stories high. It contains classrooms, conference rooms, lounges, 66 guest hotel rooms, a 225-seat dining area, administrative offices, a boardroom, a fitness center, and a pub. It houses all Executive Education programs and the Weston Career Resources Center.
- In 2014, construction was completed on an expansion of the Olin Business School facilities. With a combined donation of $25 million, Knight Hall and Bauer Hall were constructed. The two buildings are joined by a three-story-high atrium and include spaces for lectures, faculty offices, and classrooms. The café at Bauer Hall includes the only on-campus Starbucks.

=== James McKelvey School of Engineering ===
- Bryan Hall – Dedicated in 1970, this building contains office and lab space for engineering students and faculty. It houses the Computer and Communications Research Center, the Department of Computer Science and Engineering, and the Department of Electrical and Systems Engineering. Bryan Hall stands on the site of the Cupples Engineering Building, an engineering lab which was one of the ten original buildings on campus, demolished in 1967.
- Cupples II Hall – The oldest of the engineering buildings, its cornerstone was laid in 1901. Cupples II was the first building to be built outside of the Brookings Quadrangle. It was used as the Jefferson Guard Building during the 1904 World's Fair. It is connected to Bryan Hall by a bridge.
- Jolley Hall – Dedicated in 1990, Jolley houses the Department of Mechanical and Aerospace Engineering as well as departments housed in Bryan Hall. The building is connected to Bryan Hall.
- Lopata Hall – Lopata is the main entrance to the engineering complex. It is a link between Sever, Cupples II, and Urbauer Halls. Lopata has a unique four-story gallery.
- Sever Institute of Technology – Sever houses the graduate division of the School of Engineering. It also houses the Center for Engineering Computing (CEC).
- Urbauer Hall – Dedicated in 1965, Urbauer contains lab space for the School of Engineering and Applied Sciences. Housed inside are the Departments of Chemical Engineering, Mechanical, and Aerospace Engineering and the Center for Computational Mechanics. Urbauer Hall also formerly housed the Department of Civil Engineering, which admitted its final first-year undergraduate class in fall 2008.
- Whitaker Hall – Dedicated in 2003, this building houses the rapidly growing Department of Biomedical Engineering. Named after Uncas A. Whitaker, the building includes a 250-seat auditorium, a 2,000-square-foot (190 m^{2}), three-story atrium, 22,000 square feet (2,000 m^{2}) of wet and dry lab space for research and teaching, a nanofabrication room, a library, and a landscape courtyard. There are also student and faculty lounges, along with several classrooms and office pods, containing conference rooms and staff support areas.

=== School of Law ===
- Anheuser-Busch Hall – Dedicated in 1997, this 175,000-square-foot (16,300 m^{2}) structure is the home of the university's Law School. The Law School was previously housed in Mudd Hall (which was torn down to make room for the Knight Center). The hall contains a café and a reference library.

=== George Warren Brown School of Social Work ===
- Brown Hall – Dedicated in 1937, Brown Hall contains a 500-seat auditorium. It houses a portion of the School of Social Work and the Social Work Library.
- Goldfarb Hall – Dedicated in 1998, Goldfarb Hall is the latest addition to the School of Social Work. It is connected to Brown Hall, doubling the space currently available to the school.

=== Student centers ===
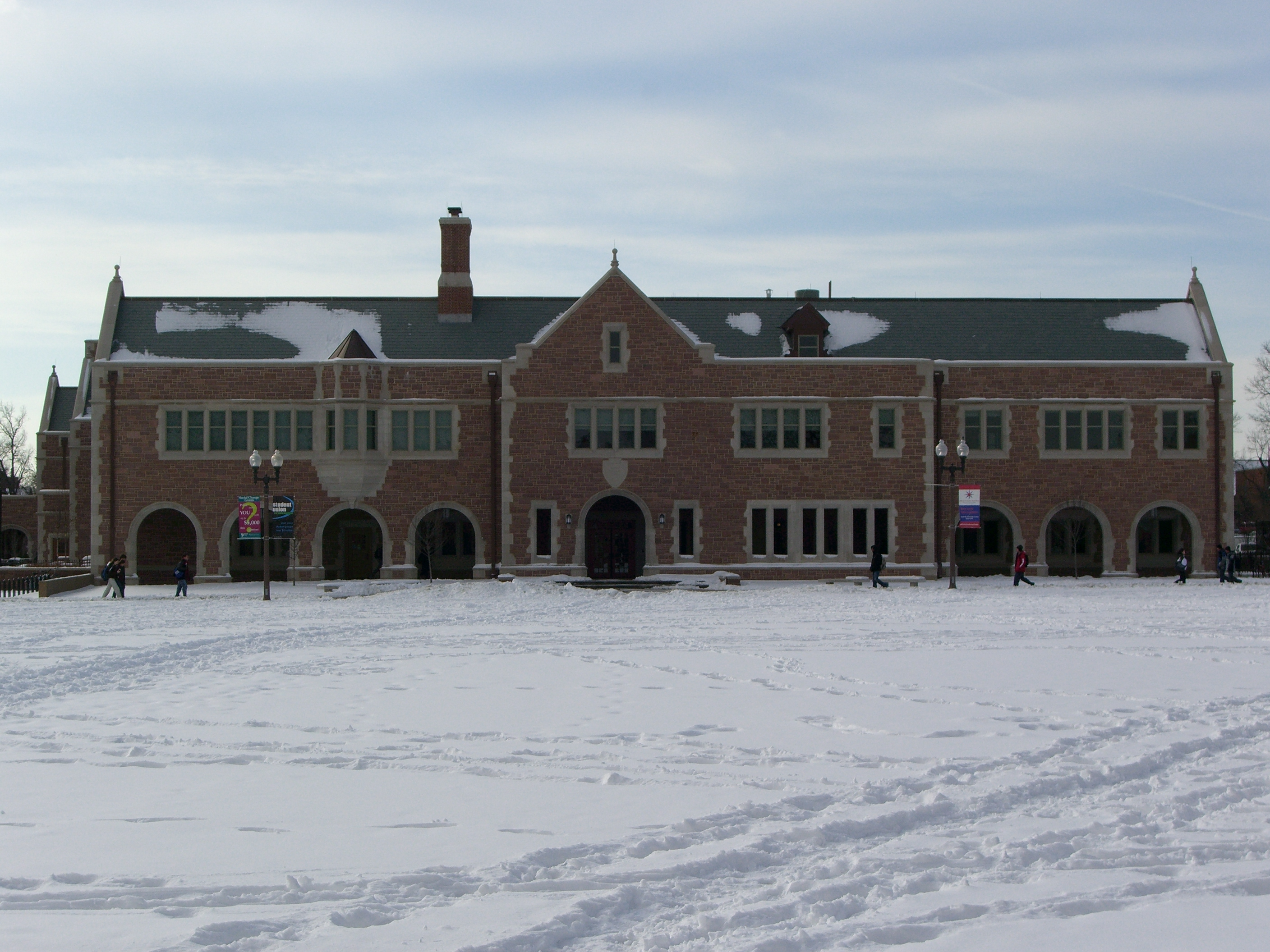
Danforth University Center

- Bowles Plaza – A large, open space located between Mallinckrodt and Umrath Hall. It contains amphitheater-style seating and a patio.
- Danforth University Center (DUC) – Dedicated in honor of emeritus Chancellor William Henry Danforth, it opened on August 11, 2008. It occupies the space where Prince Hall once stood and is the main student center on campus. The three-story, 116,000sqft building features dining areas, lounges, meeting rooms, and offices for student leaders and student services professional staff. Housed in the DUC is the Career Center, the Student Union student government, Student Life newspaper, WUTV, a recording studio for KWUR, the Graduate Center, and other on-campus groups. Underneath is a three-story underground parking garage. The building is expected to attain a LEED rating of Gold, the highest LEED rating of any current building on campus.

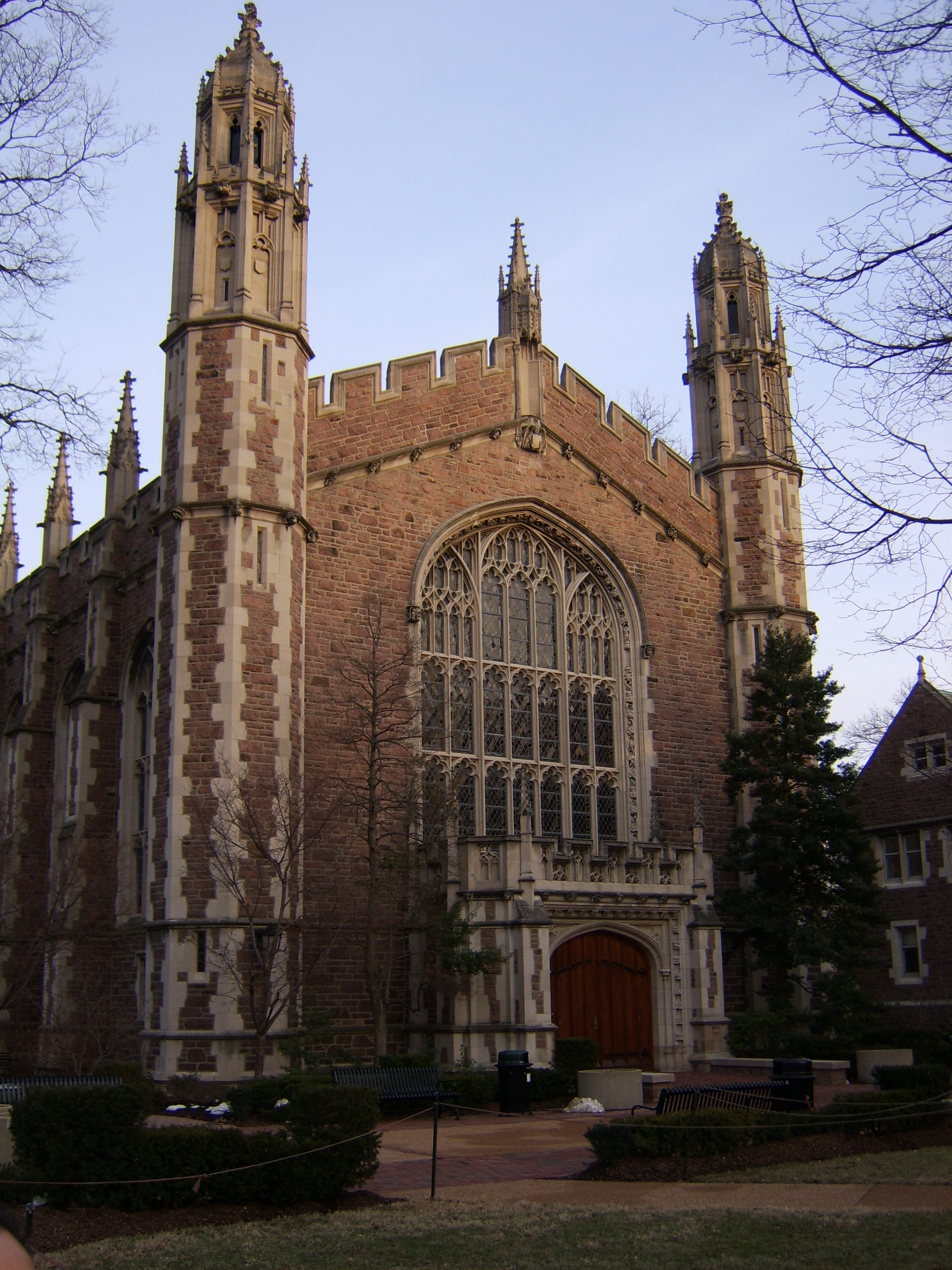
Graham Chapel

- Graham Chapel – Dedicated in 1909, the chapel is used for concerts, plays, and the university's weekly lecture program, the Assembly Series. The chapel is modeled after King's College Chapel at Cambridge University though it differs markedly in scale. In its early history, many inaccurately and publicly boasted that Graham was an exact copy of King's Chapel. Attempting to discredit this comparison, the supervising architect Jamieson writes in his Intimate History of Washington University (1941): "The Graham Memorial Chapel is not a copy... the length and height of University Chapel are so modest, and so magnificent in King's that a comparison of the two seems idle."
- Mallinckrodt Center – The central student center on the Danforth Campus. It houses the Campus Book Store, Computer Store, Dining Services, the Edison Theatre, the Division of Drama, the Division of Dance, and the Department of Performing Arts. WUTV is also housed inside.
- Olin Library – Dedicated in 1962 and renovated in 2003, Olin Library is the largest library in Missouri. The library has several computing centers as well as a cyber café.
- Umrath Hall – Begun as a men's dormitory, Umrath Hall now serves as a student center. It houses the Campus Y, a portion of the College of Arts and Sciences, Student Union, and the Career Center.
- Women's Building – Opened in 1928, this building houses meeting spaces for sororities and other student groups. It is home to the Association of Black Students Lounge, the Office of Campus Life, the Office of Orientation, the Office of Student Activities, the KWUR Radio Station, Student Life, and Student Union.

=== Athletic facilities ===
- Athletic Complex – Houses the Field House, Francis Gym, I.E. Millstone Swimming Pool, Interco Weight Room, McWilliams Fitness Center, Recreational Gym, and six Racquetball and two Squash courts.
- Bushyhead Track – Surrounding historic Francis Field, an eight-lane 400-meter synthetic-surface track named for James Butler Bushyhead. Bushyhead Track, site of the 1904 Olympics and the 2004 Olympic Global Torch Relay, is the home of the Washington University men's and women's track and field teams. Built in 1902, Bushyhead Track featured a third-of-a-mile track that was used through the early 1980s.

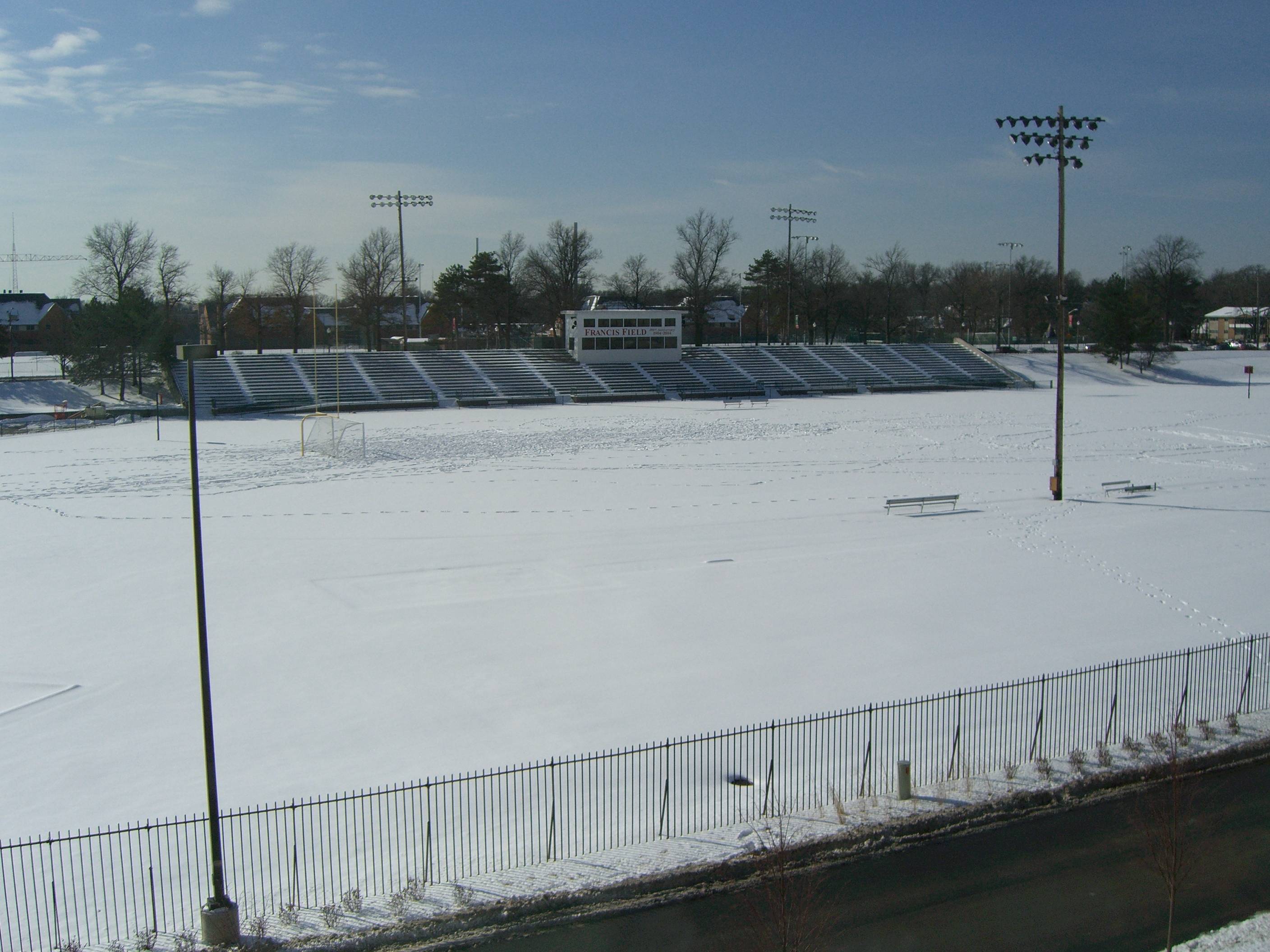
Francis Field

- Field House – Originally completed in 1926, the Field House was extensively remodeled to become an integral part of the updated athletic complex in 1985, and it now provides seating for 3,800 used during sports events. It is home to Washington University's men's and women's basketball and women's volleyball. It is also used for large events like commencement and convocation. The Field House hosted the first U.S presidential debate of the 1992 campaign, the third and final debate of the 2000 presidential campaign, the second debate of the 2004 presidential campaign, and the vice presidential debate in 2008.
- Francis Olympic Field – Used during the 1904 Olympics. The field features a FieldTurf surface installed during the summer of 2004 4 light towers for the field as well as 2 light towers for the natural grass practice field located directly west of the field. Francis Field is home to Washington University's men's football and men's and women's soccer programs.
- Francis Gymnasium – Finished in 1903, it was one of the buildings used in the 3rd modern Olympic Games, the first games held in the Western Hemisphere. They hosted the boxing and fencing events. The gymnasium portion of the building was demolished in 2015 to be replaced with a larger modern facility, with the campus-facing tower portion remaining in place.
- I.E. Millstone Swimming Pool – Built in 1985, the eight-lane, 25-meter swimming pool is equipped with a diving well. Home to Washington University's men's and women's swimming and diving team, the I.E. Millstone Pool is also utilized for water aerobics classes, swim lessons and general lap swimming. I.E. Millstone received a B.S. in engineering and architecture in 1927 and an honorary degree in 1994. He became a member of the Washington University Board of Trustees in 1964. He had a successful construction company in St. Louis, and the company built some of the residence halls on the South 40. In 1970, the Millstone Lounge and Plaza were also named in his honor. This pool replaced the campus's original Wilson Pool building, constructed in 1923 east of where the Field House now stands, and demolished as part of the 1985 upgrades to the Athletic Center.
- Kelly Field – Home to Washington University's baseball team.
- Recreational Gym – Features 3 basketball courts, a 1/10 mile track, and 2 batting cages for varsity baseball and softball practices.
- Softball Field – Home to Washington University's softball team.
- Tao Tennis Courts – The courts were resurfaced in 2006 with post-tension concrete and were painted to reflect the school colors, red and green. The six lighted courts are red with the outer boundaries being green. The courts serve as the on-campus home to Washington University's men's and women's tennis teams.

=== East Forsyth buildings ===
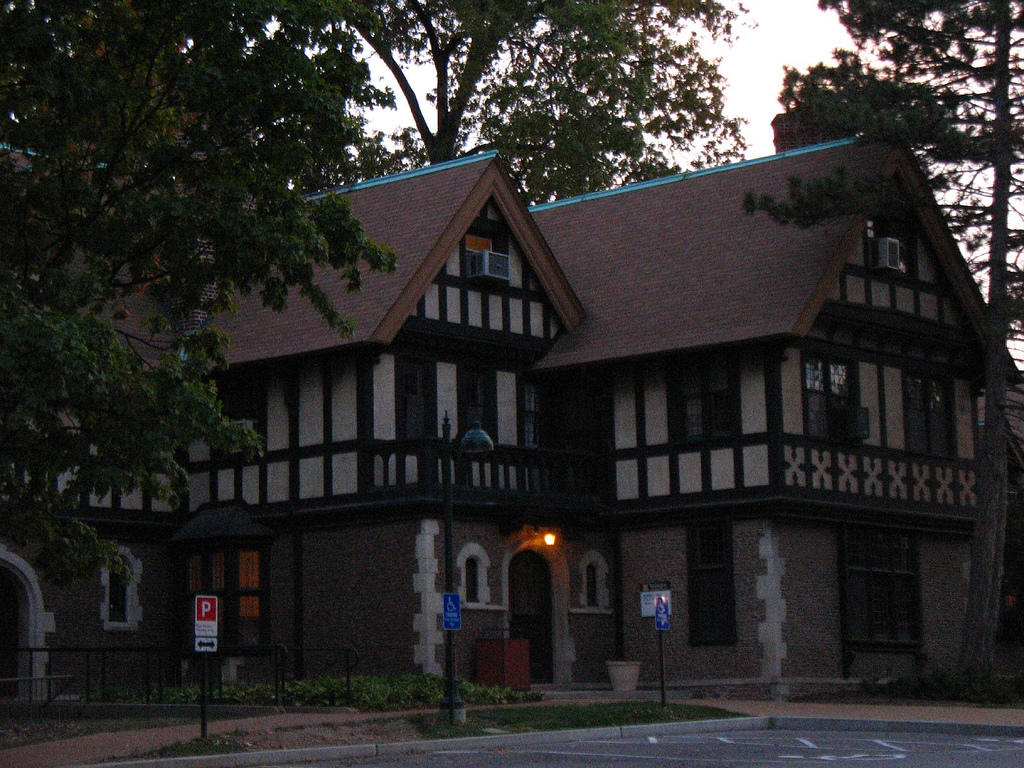
Blewett Hall

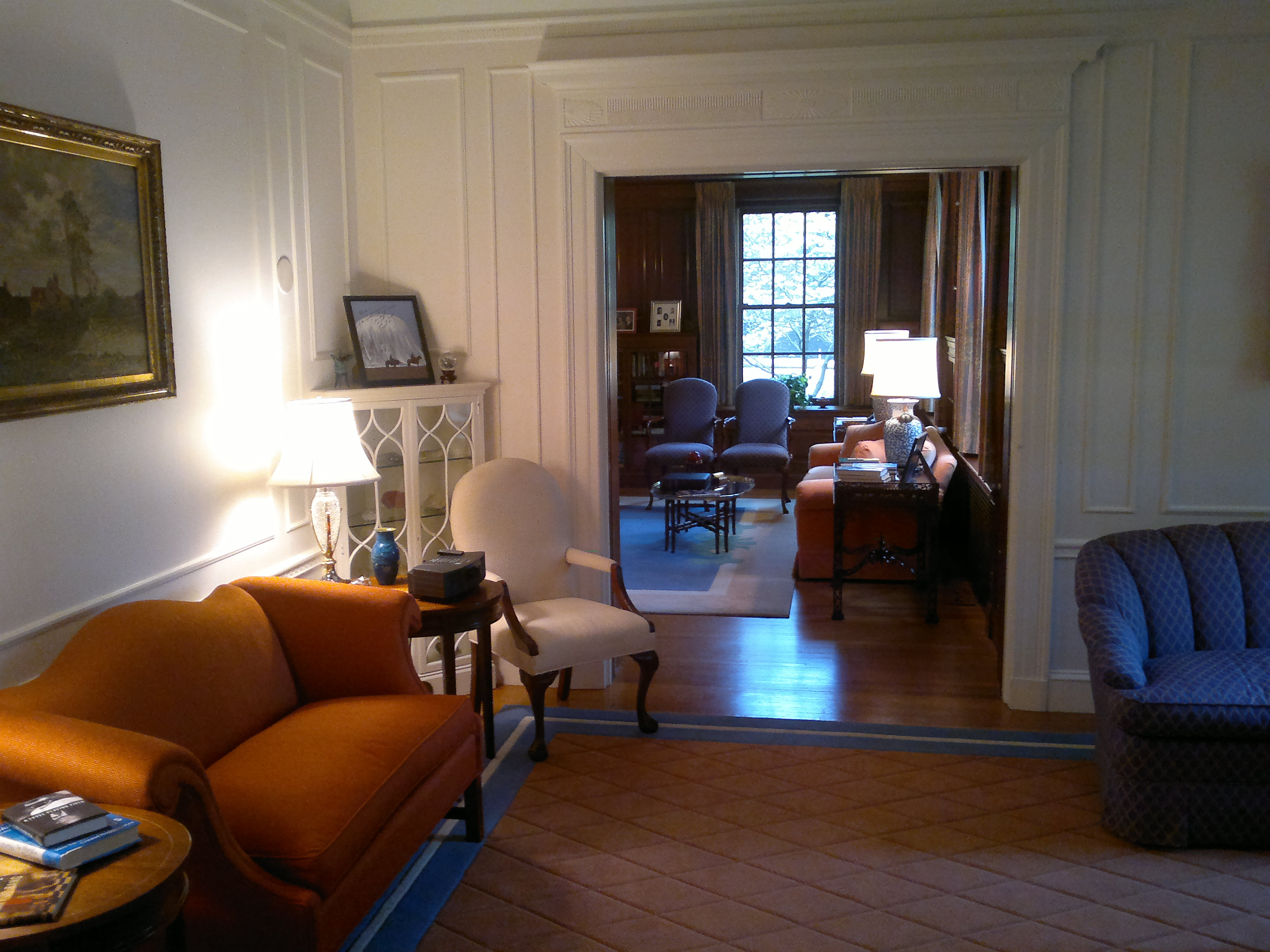
Interior of Harbison House in Wrighton's chancellorship, 2013

- Alumni House – Built in 1911 as the private home of Robert S. Brookings, the building now houses the Office of Alumni and Development Programs.
- Blewett Hall – Houses the Department of Music
- Gaylord Music Library – Dedicated in 1960, this building houses the music library.
- Harbison House – The residence of the chancellor, also used for official University functions.
- Music Classroom Building – Connected to Tietjens studio. Contains three classrooms and four studios for private music instruction.
- Stix International House – Built in 1909, it houses the Office for International Students and Scholars.
- Tietjens Memorial Music Studio – Contains 21 sound-proof practice rooms, a large area for band, choral, or orchestra practice and a recording studio.
- Whittemore House – An elegant structure built in 1912, now used to house and dine special University guests.

=== Current construction ===
- Engineering Complex – Three new buildings will be added to the School of Engineering on the Danforth Campus, totaling over 600,000 sq ft (56,000 m^{2}) of new space. New research space for the Department of Biomedical Engineering, space for the International Center for Advanced Renewable Energy and Sustainability, a centralized location for the Department of Energy, Environmental, and Chemical Engineering, and new classroom space are among the facilities to be housed in the complex. The university has a goal of achieving Platinum LEED certification, the highest level of certification for environmental sustainability in new building construction. In April 2010, both Brauer Hall was dedicated and construction began on Preston M. Green Hall. Brauer Hall serves as the centerpiece to the new complex, while Green Hall features a prominent archway leading into the complex at the corner of two major thoroughfares in the area.
- Redevelopment of the South 40 – Extensive plans are underway to replace the older dormitories on the South 40. When the entire project is completed, the area will be defined as a mixed-used facility consisting of dining locations, a small auditorium, fitness center, convenience store, lounges, storefronts for student-run businesses, and residences. The plan was modeled after a European streetscape in architecture and landscaping. In Summer of 2009, the Wohl Center was demolished to make way for the completed Phase 1 of the project, named South 40 House, containing upperclassmen dorms, a convenience store, the South 40 Fitness Center, and dining facilities. Umrath Hall was demolished in Summer 2008, and its replacement was finished in Fall 2009; the replacement Umrath Hall holds freshman residences. The current Rubelmann hall will be demolished, to make room for a replacement that will connect to Umrath Hall on all levels.
- Construction of a new building for the Olin Business School: in the Summer of 2012, what is now Eliot Hall will be demolished to be replaced with a $90 million building for the Olin Business School. At over 160,000 square feet, the building will be a significant expansion to the facilities for the business school.

== Residential life ==
The Princeton Review ranked Washington University first for Best College Dorms and third for Best College Food, Best-Run Colleges, and Best Financial Aid in its 2020 edition.

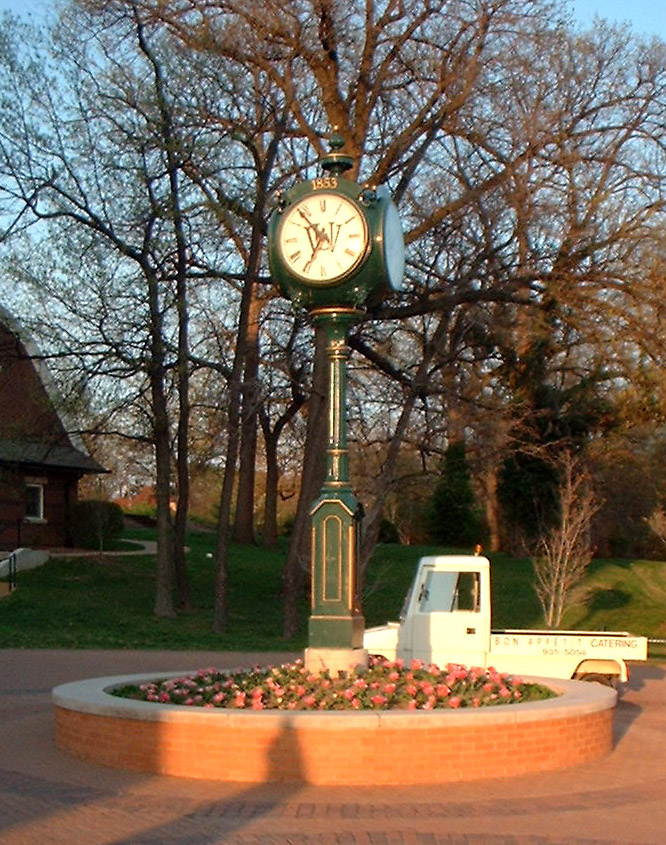
The loli-clock at the edge of the South 40.

75% of undergraduate students choose to live on campus. Housing is guaranteed for a student for all four years if a student chooses. Most of the dormitories on campus are located on the South 40, named because of its adjacent location south of the Danforth Campus and its size of 40 acres (160,000 m^{2}). It is the location of all the freshman dorms as well as several upperclassman dorms, which are occupied almost exclusively by sophomores. The majority of freshman dorms consist of double rooms; two double rooms share one connecting bathroom. Upperclass dorms are available in 4-person, 6-person, and 8-person suites and apartment-style units. All of the dorms are co-ed. In coming years, the university will be allowing upperclass students the option of mixed-gender housing, whereby any combination of males and females can live in the same suite if they so choose. The university is nearing the end of an era of replacing older residence halls with newer construction. In 2007, The Princeton Review rated Washington University in its top 20 list of schools whose dorms are "like palaces."

The South 40 is organized as a pedestrian-friendly environment where residences surround a central recreational lawn known as the Swamp. Wohl Student Center, the Habif Health and Wellness Center (Student Health Services), the Residential Life Office, Cornerstone: The Center for Advanced Learning, University Police Headquarters, various student owned businesses (e.g. the laundry service, "Wash U Wash", and the baseball, softball, and intramural fields are also located on the South 40. Also in 2007, The Princeton Review rated the university as 4th on its rankings for Best Quality of Life for students. The Princeton Review ranked Washington University first for Best College Dorms and third for Best College Food, Best-Run Colleges, and Best Financial Aid in its 2020 edition.

There are nearly 20 dining locations on the Washington University campus. In addition to a Subway restaurant, nearly all locations are operated by the catering service Bon Appétit Management Company. The cafeteria within the law school is operated by Aramark Corporation, and the Einstein Bros. Bagels branch within Simon Hall is independently operated. The university is one of the few that offer an abundance of Kosher food items available at the majority of dining locations on campus. The dining facilities and quality of food are consistently ranked highly by The Princeton Review.

=== Residential Colleges ===
Residences on the South Forty ("the Forty") are subdivided into smaller groups: residential colleges ("res colleges"). A live-in university staff member—the residential college director ("RCD")—organizes social events within his or her residential college, comprising several houses, administratively a single unit. When originally organized, residential colleges consisted of a freshman dormitory and an upperclassman dormitory, though, currently, only five of the nine meet these criteria. Within each residential college, an elected group of students plans community-building activities and events. The Congress of the South 40 oversees the residential college Councils and plans a popular event "Residential College Olympics" each spring.

Residential Colleges include:

- Wayman Crow (Howard Nemerov and Nathan Dardick Houses)
- Robert S. Brookings (Arnold J. Lien and Kate M. Gregg Houses)
- William Greenleaf Eliot (WGE) (Elizabeth G. Danforth, Ethan A.H. Shepley, and Butron M. Wheeler Houses)
- Park/Mudd (Helen Ette Park and Mudd Houses)
- JKL (Thomas G. Rutledge, Carl A. Dauten, and Shanedling Houses)
- HIG (Herbert F. Hitzeman, Chester Myers, and Frank E. Hurd)
- Thomas H Eliot (Thomas H. Eliot House and Eliot B Houses)
- Lee/Beaumont (John F. Lee and Louis Beaumont Houses)
- USoFo (Helen F. Umrath and South Forty Houses)
- Liggett/Koenig (John E. Liggett and Edwin C. Koenig Houses)

Each Residential College includes the following amenities:

- Residential College Director
- Faculty Families - A professor that has an apartment inside the Residential College
- Faculty Fellows/Associates - Faculty members who are paired with freshman floors. They have dinner with their floors weekly, make occasional visits and participate in floor programming
- Residential Advisers - Junior and Senior student leaders chosen to serve as Peer Mentor, Advocate for Social Justice, Campus Partner, Programmer, Residential Life Team Member and Administrator. They complete hundreds of hours of training to learn how to serve their residents and maintain the integrity and cohesiveness of the community.
- Residential Peer Mentors - Students who serve as tutors for large freshman classes (Calculus, Chemistry, Writing, Physics, etc.)
- Washington University Student Associates (WUSA) - Upperclassmen who assist freshmen with the social transition to college
- Residential Peer Health Educators - Upperclassmen who are trained to answer questions about, and implement programs to educate freshmen on the health transition in college
- Residential Computer Consultants - Upperclassmen who are trained to fix common computer problems
- Rooms - Freshmen are typically housed in suites of two doubles joined by a bathroom while upperclassmen live in suites of four singles joined by a common area and two bathrooms
- Computer Labs - PC and Macintosh computer stations and print release stations (print charges are first deducted from budget given until exhausted and then from prepaid accounts called Campus Card Points)
- Wireless Internet access throughout the dorms, in addition to wired Ethernet and cable television hookups in each room
- Lounges - Each floor in the residential houses has common lounges with couches, tables, small kitchens and televisions
- Kitchens - Each residential house contains a full kitchen

=== South Forty Center ===
The South Forty Center is a mixed-use facility consisting of dining locations, a small auditorium, fitness center, convenience store, lounges, and residences on the upper floors. The dining location, known as Bear's Den, which includes stations such as the Cherry Tree Cafe (coffee and baked goods), Ciao Down (pasta and pizza), Grizzly Grill (burgers and other "American-style" food), WUrld Fusion (Indian inspired Global cuisine), L 'Chaim (fresh, Kosher meals), OSO Good (Mexican fare, such a tacos and burritos), and Sizzle & Stir (Mongolian-style stir-fry). The center also features convenience store, "Paws 'n' Go". More commonly known to students as "Bear Mart", the store serves as a miniature grocery store, selling snacks, drinks, fresh fruit and vegetables, and frozen meals, as well as baking goods. The area also features a soup and salad bar. The South Forty Center also houses the work-out facilities for the South 40, as well as Residential Life and Dining Services offices, and student residences on the upper floors.

=== North Side ===
Another group of residences, known as the North Side, is located in the northwest corner of Danforth Campus. Only open to upperclassmen and January Scholars, the North Side consists of Millbrook Apartments, The Village, Village East, and all fraternity houses except the Zeta Beta Tau house, which is off campus. Sororities at Washington University do not have houses by their own accord. The Village is a group of residences where students who have similar interests or academic goals apply as small groups of 4 to 24, known as BLOCs, to live together in clustered suites, as well as non-BLOC students. Like the South 40, the residences around the Village also surround a recreational lawn as well as its own student center.

== Campus art and sculpture ==
The campus is also home to the Barry Flanagan bronze statue, "Thinker on a Rock", referred to as "The Bunny", and is located near Mallinckrodt Center, Graham Chapel and Mallinckrodt (Edison Theater).

The Mildred Lane Kemper Art Museum on campus houses most of the university's art and sculpture collections, including pieces by Jackson Pollock, Robert Rauschenberg, Jenny Holzer, Pablo Picasso, Max Ernst, Willem de Kooning, Henri Matisse, Joan Miró, and Rembrandt van Rijn, among others.

== Image gallery ==
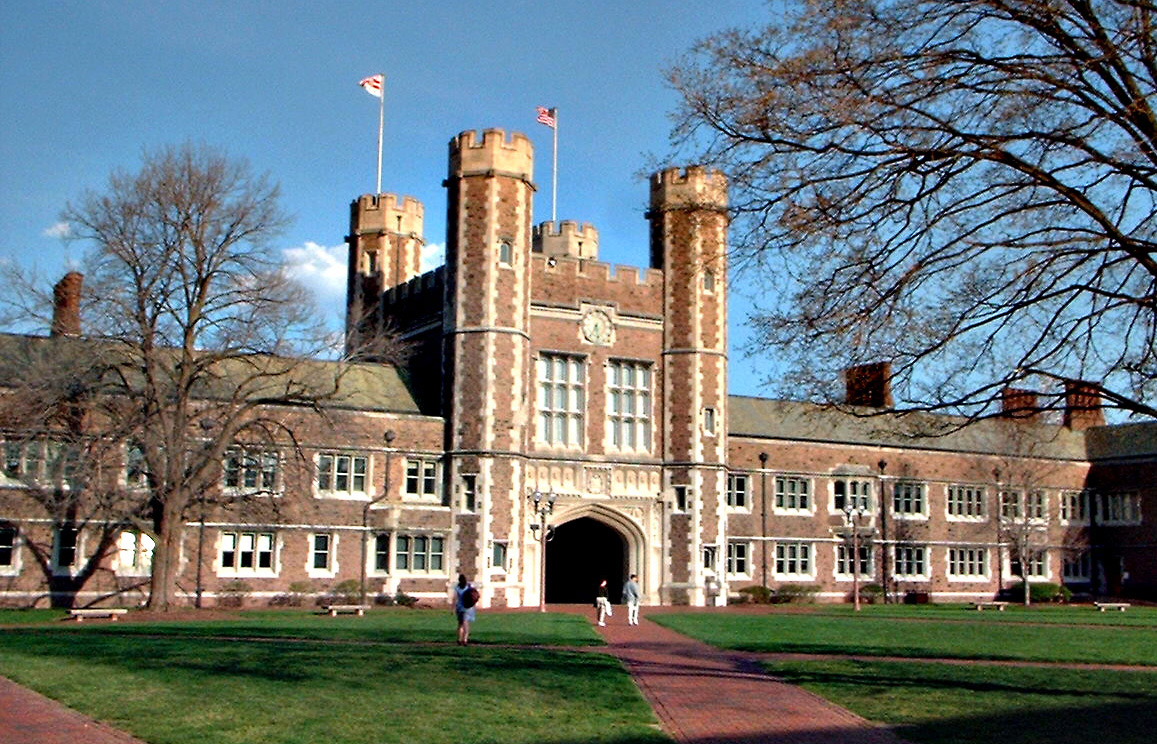
Brookings Hall

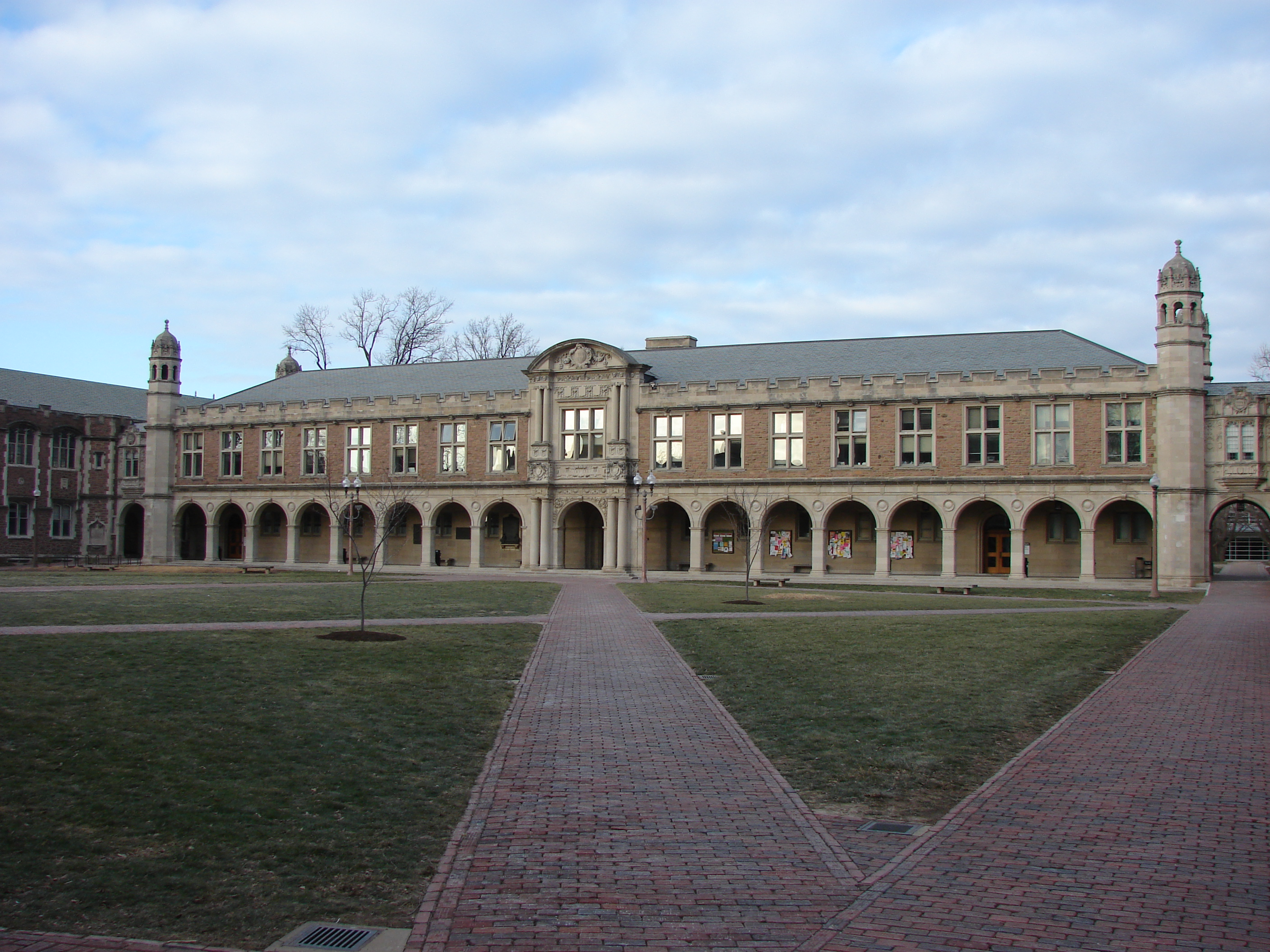
Ridgley Hall

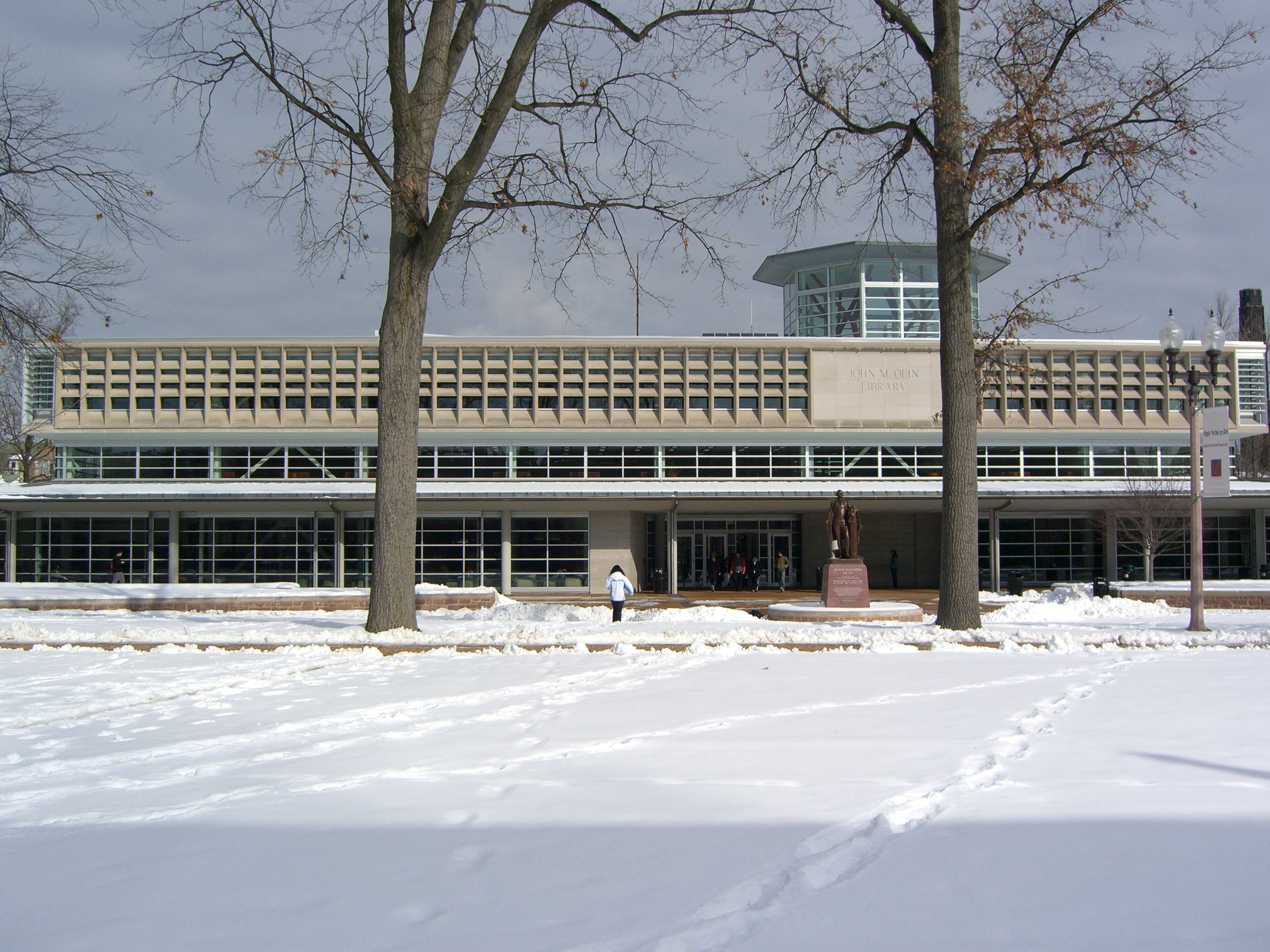
Olin Library in the snow

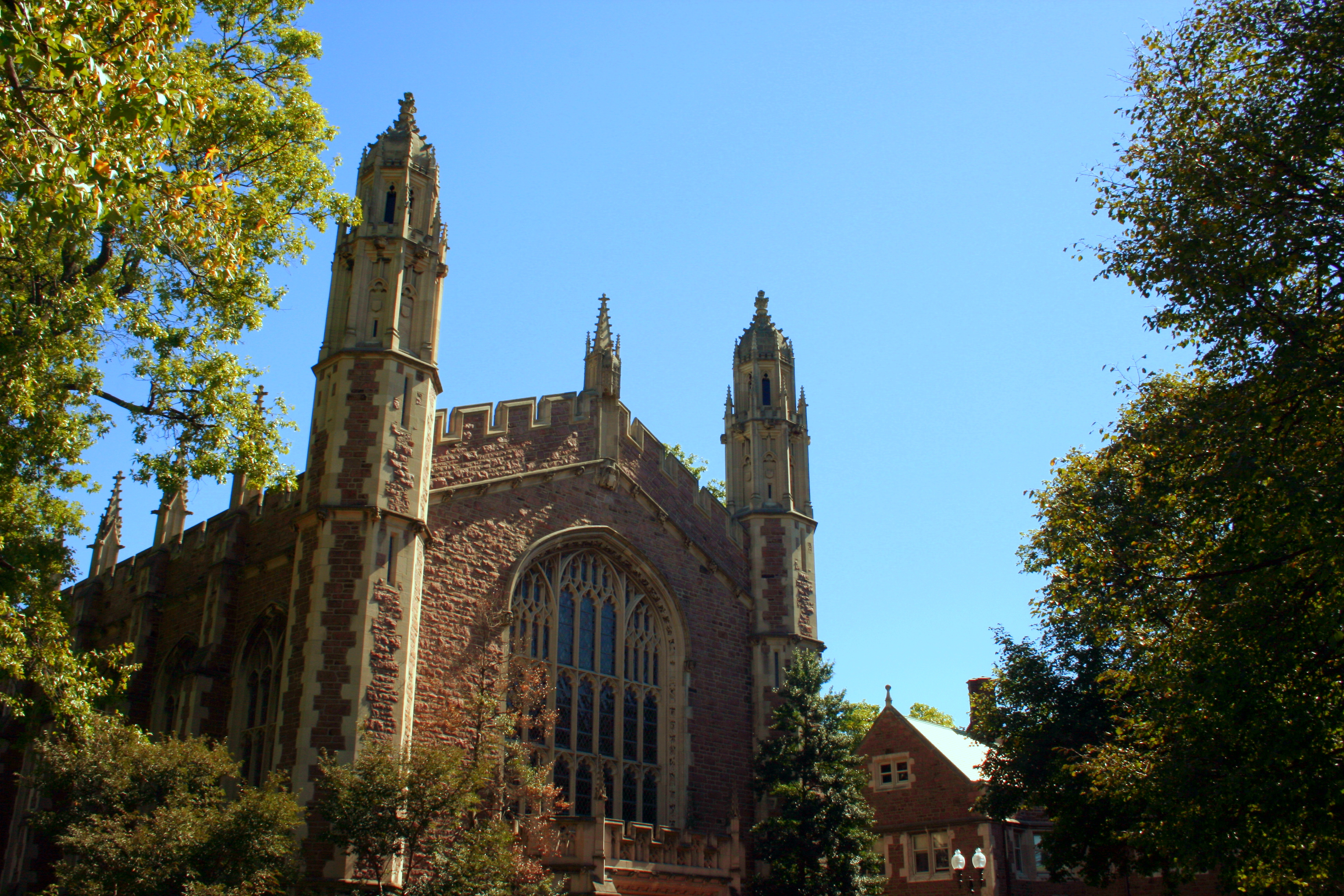
Graham Chapel

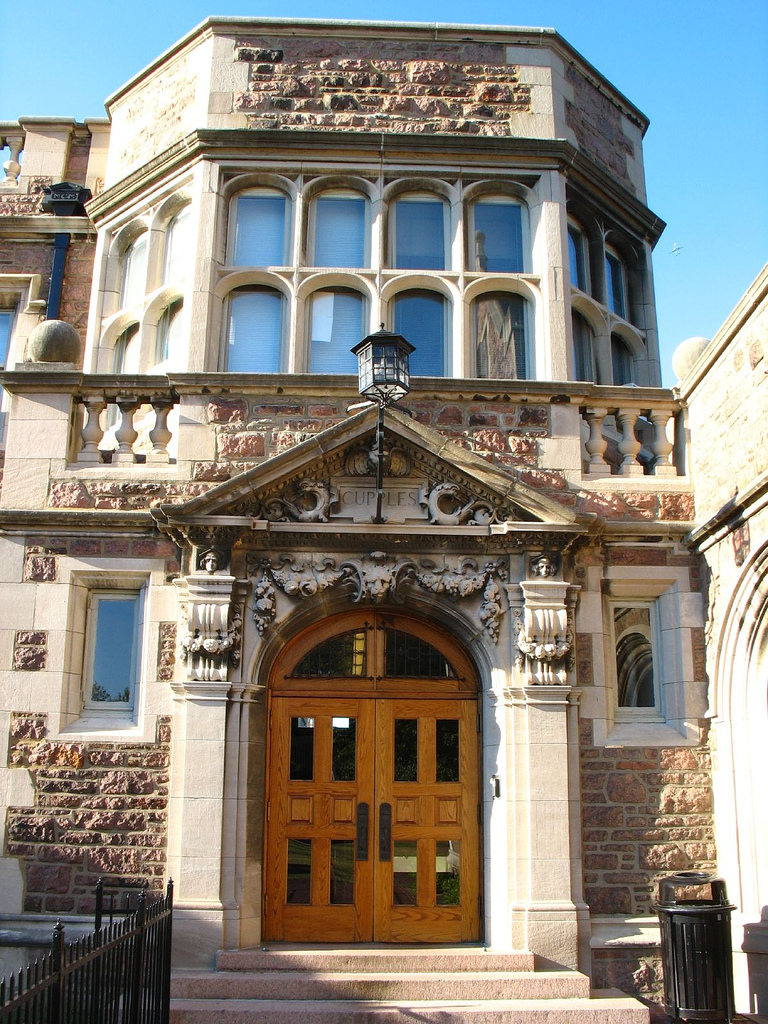
Cupples I Hall

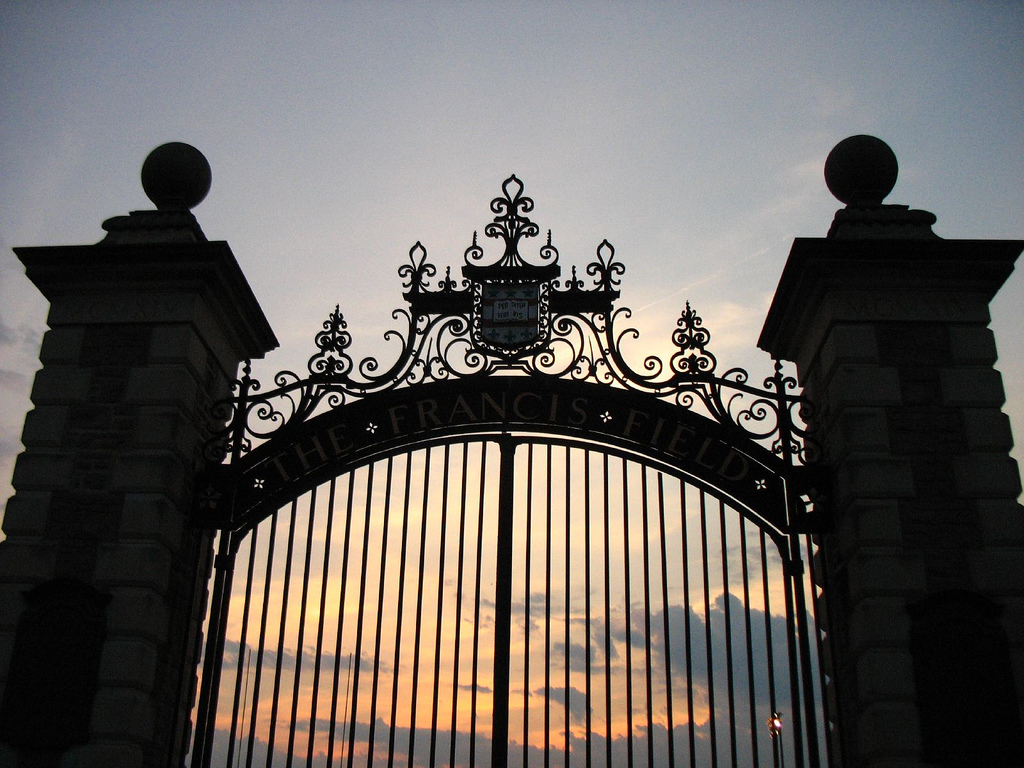
Gates at Francis Field

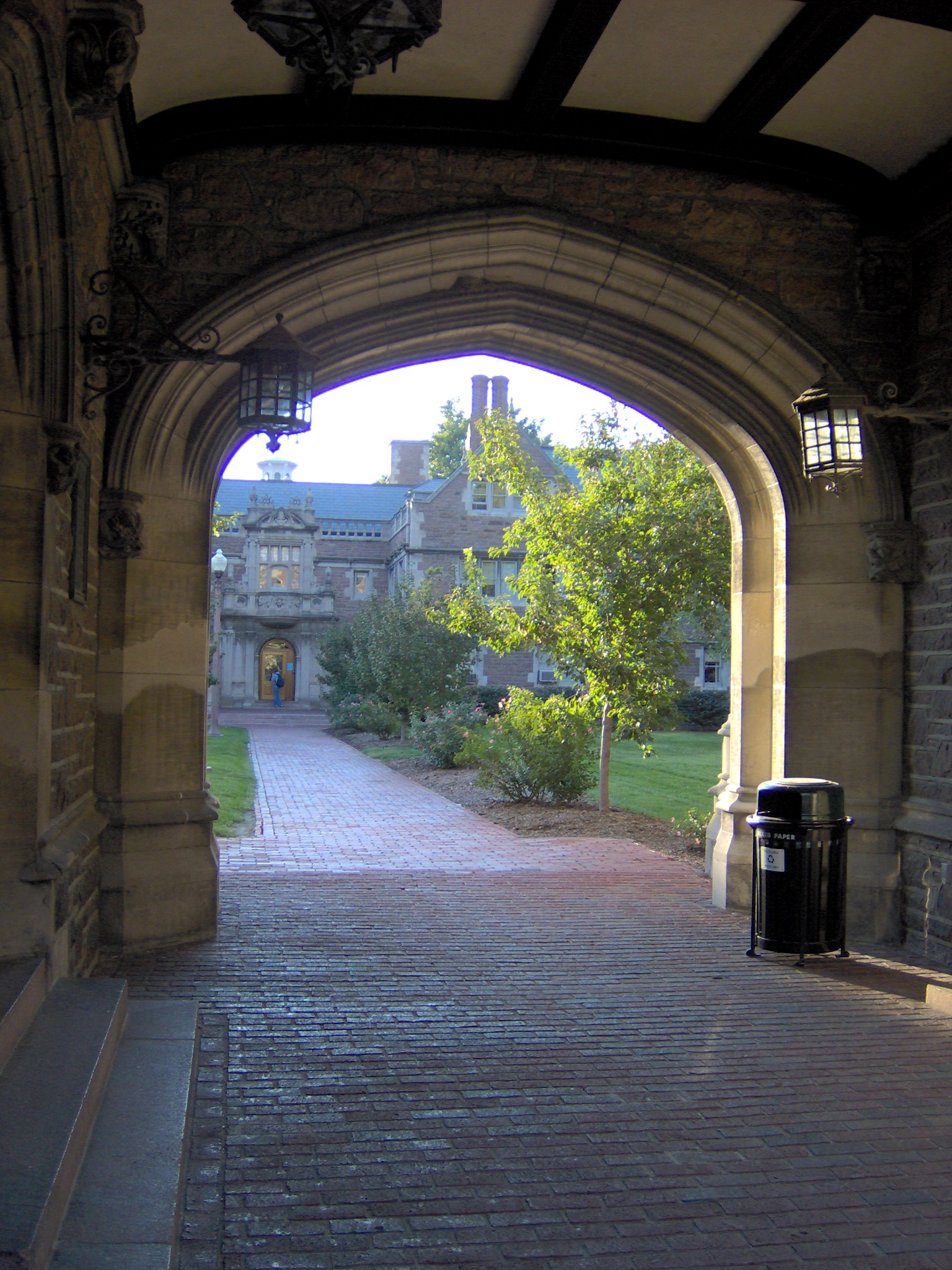
McMillan Hall

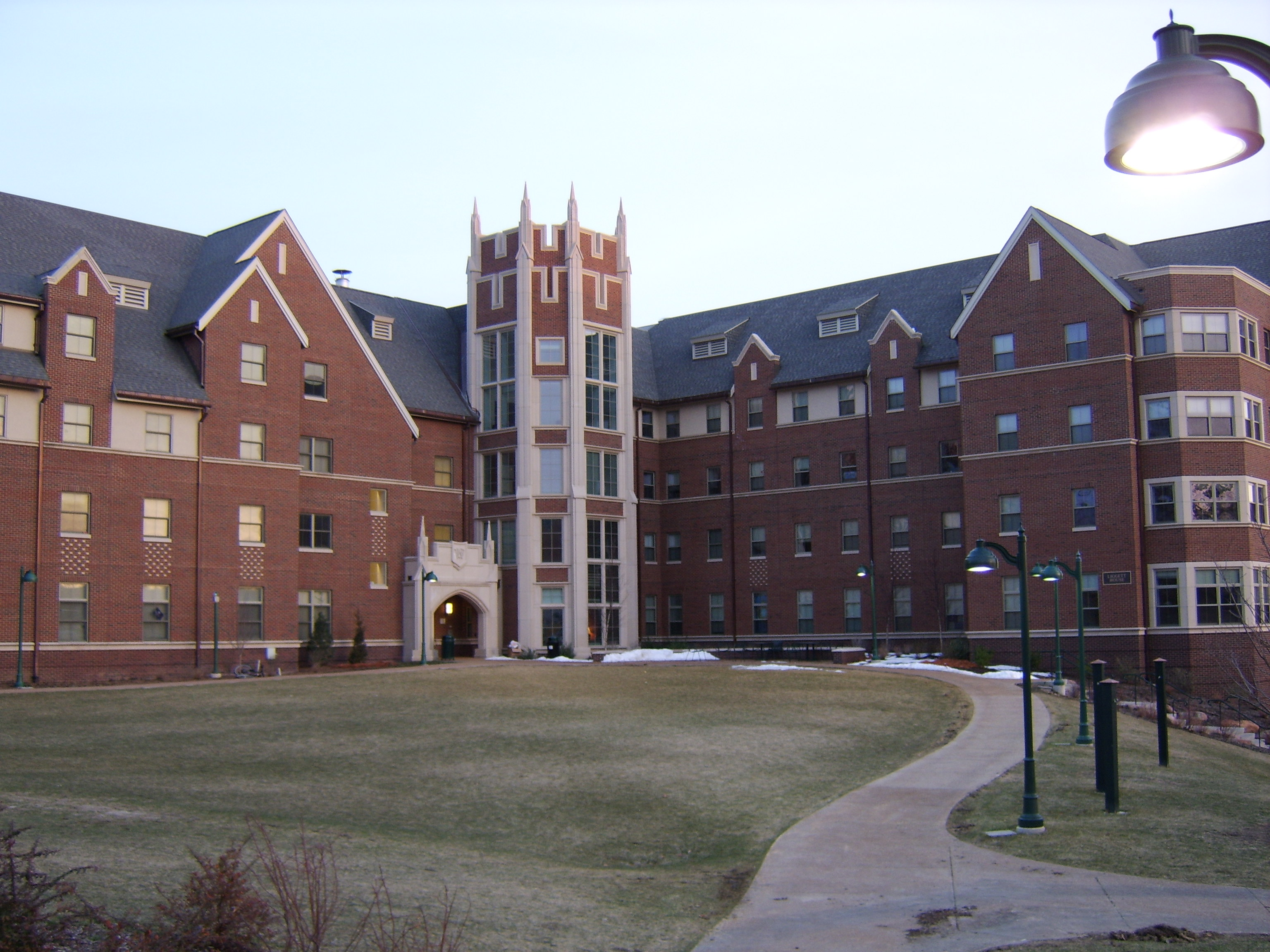
Liggett-Koenig Hall on the South 40

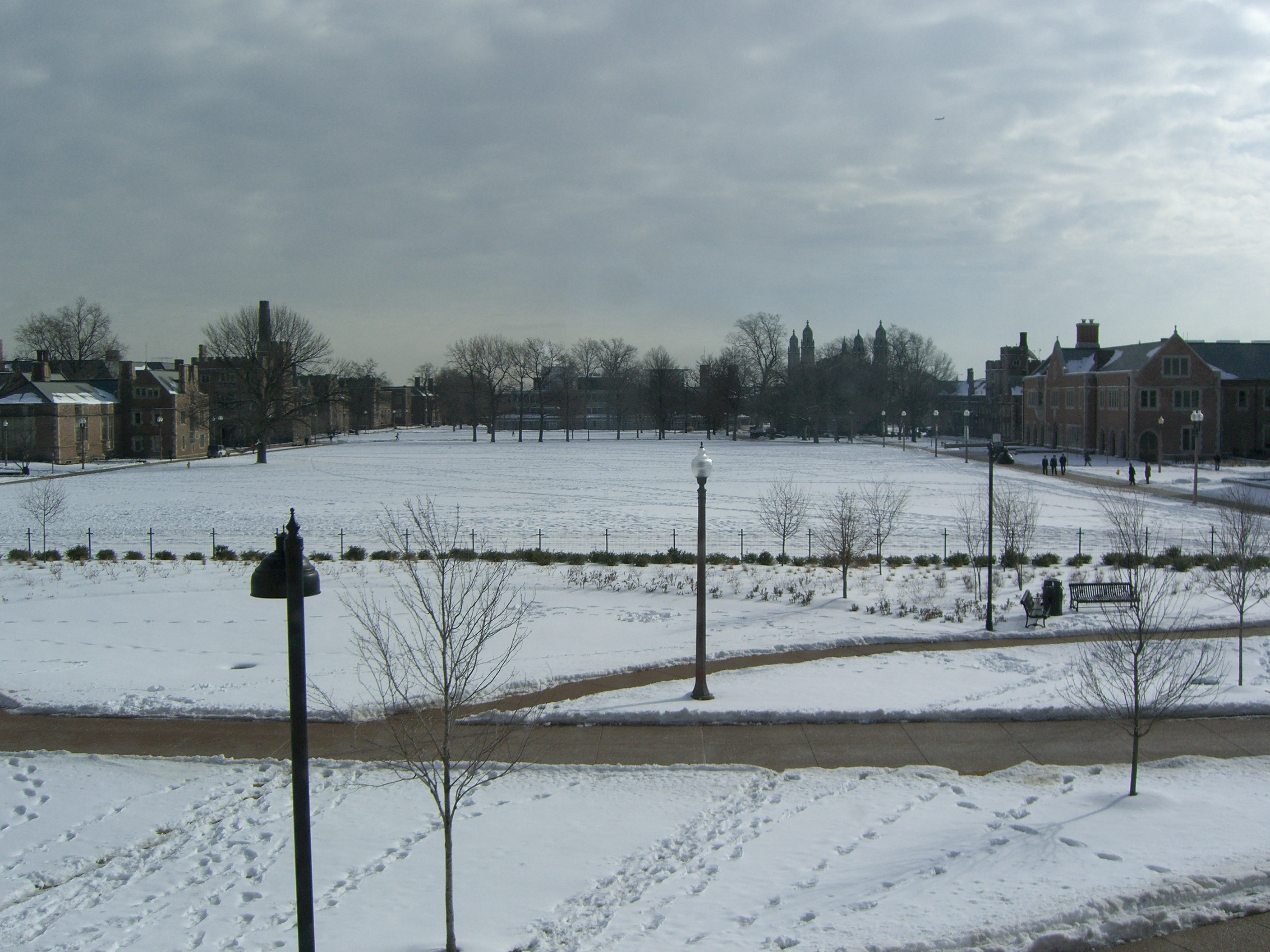
West Danforth Campus

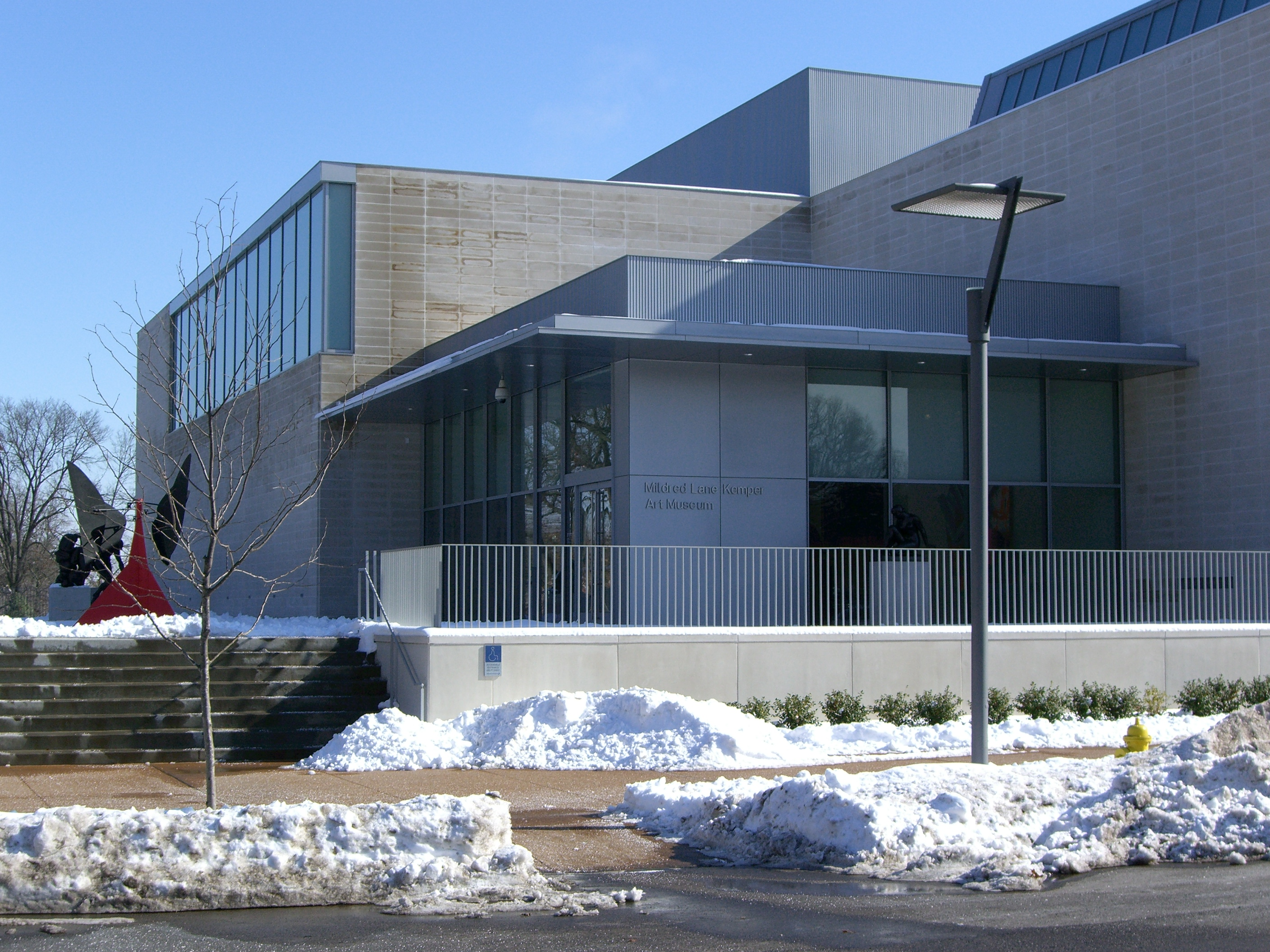
Kemper Art Museum

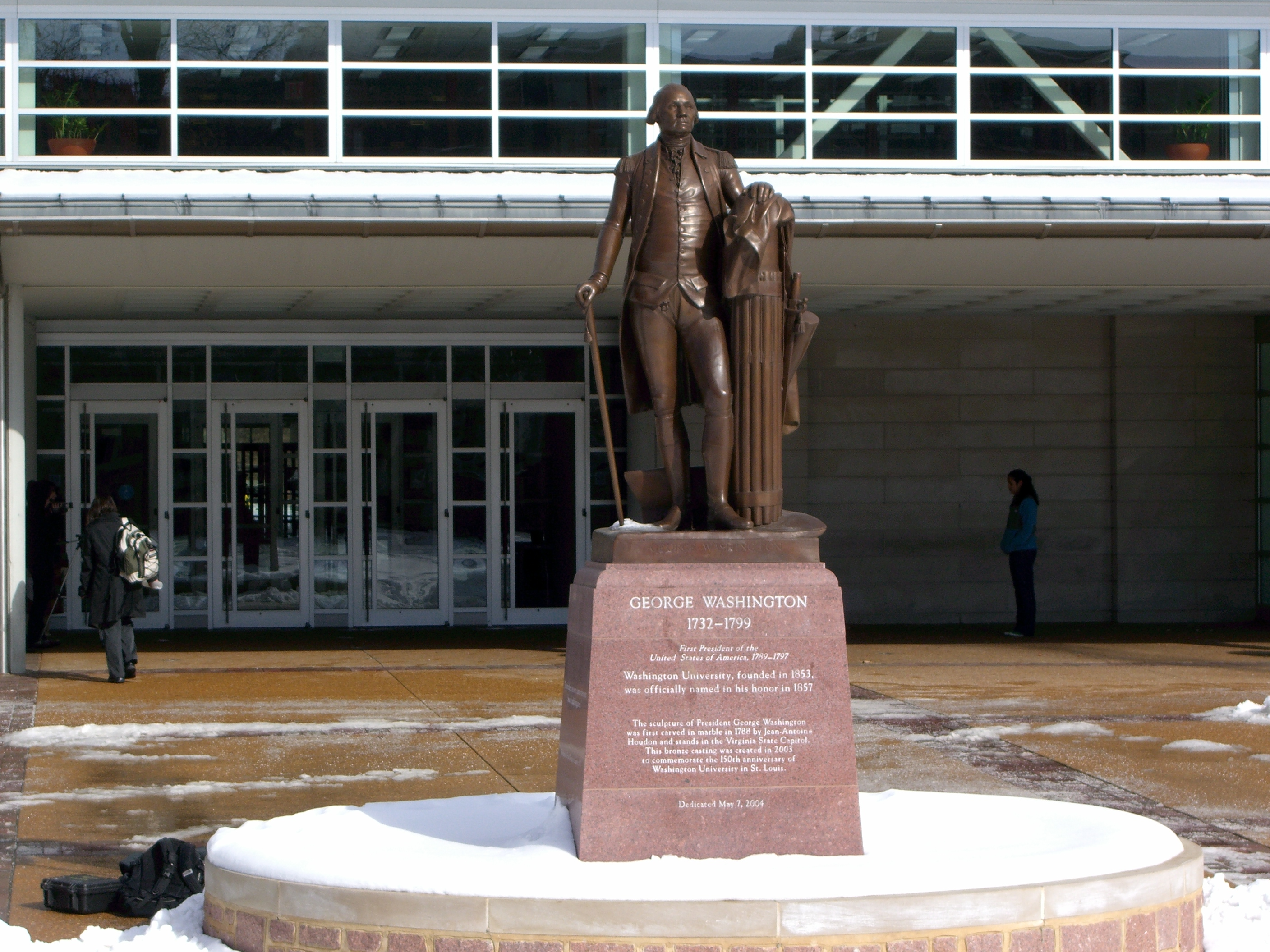
George Washington statue

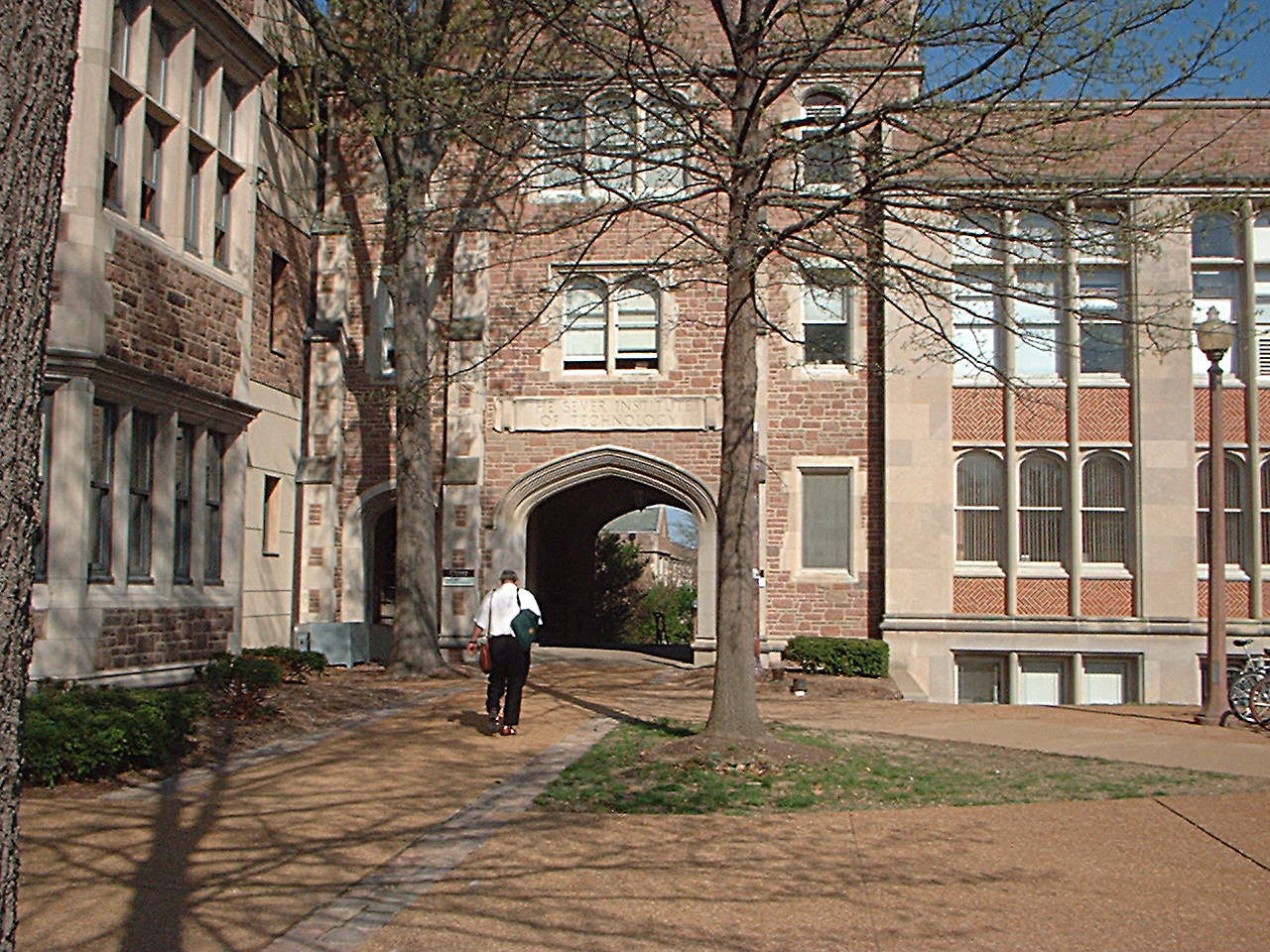
Sever Arch

== References and notes ==
- "Washington University Hilltop Campus Historic District" (PDF). Missouri Department of Natural Resources. Archived (PDF) from the original on June 24, 2008.
