= Washington University in St. Louis student life =

Washington University in St. Louis has varied programs and events for students.

== Student organizations ==
Washington University has over 300 registered undergraduate student organizations on campus. All are funded by WUSTL's student government, the Washington University Student Union, which has an approximately $3.6 million annual budget that is completely student controlled and is one of the largest student government budgets in the country. Known as SU for short, it sponsors large-scale campus programs including WILD (a semesterly concert in the quad), free copies of The New York Times, USA Today, and the St. Louis Post-Dispatch through The Collegiate Readership Program; the Assembly Series, a weekly lecture series; and the campus television station, WUTV and the radio station, KWUR and Filmboard. The Office of Student Activities provides advisors, leadership training, counseling, and other support to the student groups on campus.

The university is home to one of the largest collegiate Relay For Life in the country, raising over $200,000 last year in total donations. Additionally, there are over 50 community service groups on campus such as a Habitat for Humanity Campus Chapter.

There are 10 national fraternities and 8 national sororities on campus; there are also 8 national black Greek organizations which have citywide St. Louis chapters. 9 of the fraternities have houses on the Danforth Campus, while none of the sororities have houses by their own accord. Approximately 30% of Washington University students participate in Greek Life. Greek Organizations are governed by the principles of Arete, which focuses on Integrity, Loyalty, Philanthropy, Responsibility, Friendship, and Intellectual Curiosity.

=== Washington University Student Union ===
The Washington University Student Union is the undergraduate student government of Washington University in St. Louis. Founded in 1967, Student Union carries out three major activities: representing student interests; registering, funding, and supporting student groups; and planning campus-wide events. It is divided into three branches: the Executive, Legislative, and Judicial branches. The Student Union Executive Branch comprises 5 elected individuals, who are the student body officials - the President, Vice President of Administration, Vice President of Finance, Vice President of Programming, and Vice President of Public Relations - who are charged with managing and allocating the budget, being the point of contact with University administration, and leading and setting the direction for Student Union. The Legislative branch includes the Treasury and the Senate. The Treasury of the Student Union hears appeals for finances from various student groups. Approximately 300 student groups on campus are registered SU groups, utilizing a large portion of the over $2 million budget. Recent resolutions of the Senate include improving Wi-Fi capabilities, improving relations between Alumni & Development and the Career Center, adding new capabilities to student ID cards, forming a LGBTQA task force, requiring all professors to distribute course syllabi and midterm grade progresses, and increasing the minimum wage of university workers. The SU Judicial Branch includes a Constitutional Council comprising a Chief Justice, four Associate Justices, and one Alternate. The Election Commissioners also fall under the Judicial Branch of Student Union. SU also publishes Bearings, the unofficial student handbook, and its supplemental website.

=== Music ===
Washington University is home to 13 official a cappella groups, including Mosaic Whispers and After Dark. Mosaic Whispers have appeared on Ben Folds' Ben Folds Presents: University A Cappella! In 2008, After Dark performed on CBS News during coverage of the vice presidential debate with specially written songs about Joe Biden and Sarah Palin. Other groups include The Amateurs, The Aristocats, Deliverance, The Ghost Lights, The Greenleafs, More Fools Than Wise, The Mosaic Whispers, The Pikers, SensAsian, Staam, The Stereotypes, and Sur Awaaz. An umbrella organization known as ACAC (A Cappella Advisory Council) oversees auditions for its member groups each fall. Many of these groups are continually selected for national collegiate a cappella compilations, such as BOCA and Voices Only. The Stereotypes have also made it to the top 8 groups of the Midwest for the past three consecutive years in the International Championship of Collegiate A Cappella and represented the Midwest as its sole competitor at the International Competition at Lincoln Center in 2011 where they placed 4th and received the award for Outstanding Arrangement.

Another student-run music group, the Wash U Pops Orchestra (a.k.a. "WU Pops"), was founded in the '07-'08 school year in the spirit of traditional pops orchestras. It has grown significantly enough since founding to have spawned two chamber groups. The full orchestra performs at least once a semester, with the chamber groups performing many smaller gigs both on and off campus.

The university also has a Department of Music that, in addition to providing concentrated study for music majors, also provides instrument and voice lessons to students. There are also a number of instrumental groups and ensembles in which students may participate.

Other student organizations, such as the Social Programming Board bring in popular musical acts for Walk In Lay Down and lesser-known independent performers. Recent WILD performers include Karmin, Chance the Rapper, Wolfgang Gartner, and Matt Kearney.

== Residential life ==
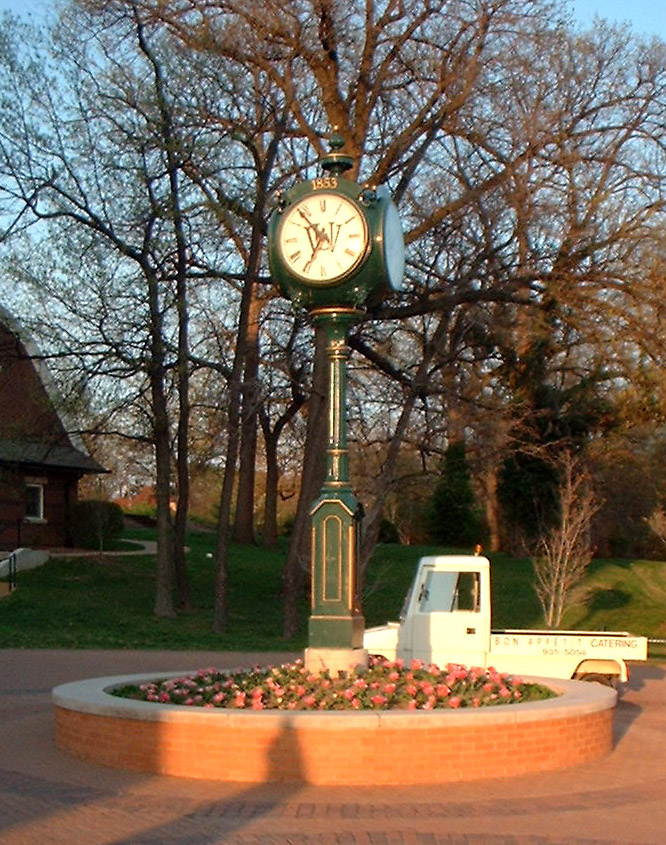
The loli-clock at the edge of the South 40.

75% of undergraduate students choose to live on campus. Housing is guaranteed for a student for all four years if a student chooses. Most of the dormitories on campus are located on the South 40, named because of its adjacent location south of the Danforth Campus and its size of 40 acres (160,000 m^{2}). It is the location of all the freshman dorms as well as several upperclassman dorms, which are occupied almost exclusively by sophomores. The majority of freshman dorms consist of double rooms; two double rooms share one connecting bathroom. Upperclass dorms are available in 4-person, 6-person, and 8-person suites and apartment-style units. All of the dorms are co-ed. In coming years, the university will be allowing upperclass students the option of mixed-gender housing, whereby any combination of males and females can live in the same suite if they so choose. The university is nearing the end of an era of replacing older residence halls with newer construction. In 2007, The Princeton Review rated Washington University in its top 20 list of schools whose dorms are "like palaces."

The South 40 is organized as a pedestrian-friendly environment where residences surround a central recreational lawn known as the Swamp. Wohl Student Center, the Habif Health and Wellness Center (Student Health Services), the Residential Life Office, Cornerstone: The Center for Advanced Learning, University Police Headquarters, various student owned businesses (e.g. the laundry service, "Wash U Wash", and the baseball, softball, and intramural fields are also located on the South 40. Also in 2007, The Princeton Review rated the university as 4th on its rankings for Best Quality of Life for students.

There are nearly 20 dining locations on the Washington University campus. In addition to a Subway restaurant, nearly all locations are operated by the catering service Bon Appétit Management Company. The cafeteria within the law school is operated by Aramark Corporation, and the Einstein Bros. Bagels branch within Simon Hall is independently operated. The university is one of the few that offer an abundance of Kosher food items available at the majority of dining locations on campus. The dining facilities and quality of food are consistently ranked highly by The Princeton Review.

=== Residential Colleges ===
Residences on the South Forty ("the Forty") are subdivided into smaller groups: residential colleges ("res colleges"). A live-in university staff member—the residential college director ("RCD")—organizes social events within his or her residential college, comprising several houses, administratively a single unit. When originally organized, residential colleges consisted of a freshman dormitory and an upperclassman dormitory, though, currently, only five of the nine meet these criteria. Within each residential college, an elected group of students plans community-building activities and events. The Congress of the South 40 oversees the residential college Councils and plans a popular event "Residential College Olympics" each spring.

Residential Colleges include:

- Wayman Crow (Howard Nemerov and Nathan Dardick Houses)
- Robert S. Brookings (Arnold J. Lien and Kate M. Gregg Houses)
- William Greenleaf Eliot (WGE) (Elizabeth G. Danforth, Ethan A.H. Shepley, and Butron M. Wheeler Houses)
- Park/Mudd (Helen Ette Park and Mudd Houses)
- JKLLB (Thomas G. Rutledge, Carl A. Dauten, Shanedling, John F. Lee, and Louis Beaumont Houses)
- HIG (Herbert F. Hitzeman, Chester Myers, and Frank E. Hurd)
- Thomas H Eliot (Thomas H. Eliot House and Eliot B Houses)
- USoFo (Helen F. Umrath and South Forty Houses)
- Liggett/Koenig (John E. Liggett and Edwin C. Koenig Houses)

Each Residential College includes the following amenities:

- Residential College Director
- Faculty Families - A professor that has an apartment inside the Residential College
- Faculty Fellows/Associates - Faculty members who are paired with freshman floors. They have dinner with their floors weekly, make occasional visits and participate in floor programming
- Residential Advisers - Junior and Senior student leaders chosen to serve as Peer Mentor, Advocate for Social Justice, Campus Partner, Programmer, Residential Life Team Member and Administrator. They complete hundreds of hours of training to learn how to serve their residents and maintain the integrity and cohesiveness of the community.
- Residential Peer Mentors - Students who serve as tutors for large freshman classes (Calculus, Chemistry, Writing, Physics, etc.)
- Washington University Student Associates (WUSA) - Upperclassmen who assist freshmen with the social transition to college
- Residential Peer Health Educators - Upperclassmen who are trained to answer questions about, and implement programs to educate freshmen on the health transition in college
- Residential Computer Consultants - Upperclassmen who are trained to fix common computer problems
- Rooms - Freshmen are typically housed in suites of two doubles joined by a bathroom while upperclassmen live in suites of four singles joined by a common area and two bathrooms
- Computer Labs - PC and Macintosh computer stations and print release stations (print charges are first deducted from budget given until exhausted and then from prepaid accounts called Campus Card Points)
- Wireless Internet access throughout the dorms, in addition to wired Ethernet and cable television hookups in each room
- Lounges - Each floor in the residential houses has common lounges with couches, tables, small kitchens and televisions
- Kitchens - Each residential house contains a full kitchen

=== South Forty Center ===
The South Forty Center is a mixed-use facility consisting of dining locations, a small auditorium, fitness center, convenience store, lounges, and residences on the upper floors. The dining location, known as Bear's Den, which includes stations such as the Cherry Tree Cafe (coffee and baked goods), Ciao Down (pasta and pizza), Grizzly Grill (burgers and other "American-style" food), WUrld Fusion (Indian inspired Global cuisine), L 'Chaim (fresh, Kosher meals), OSO Good (Mexican fare, such a tacos and burritos), and Sizzle & Stir (Mongolian-style stir-fry). The center also features convenience store, "Paws 'n' Go". More commonly known to students as "Bear Mart", the store serves as a miniature grocery store, selling snacks, drinks, fresh fruit and vegetables, and frozen meals, as well as baking goods. The area also features a soup and salad bar. The South Forty Center also houses the work-out facilities for the South 40, as well as Residential Life and Dining Services offices, and student residences on the upper floors.

=== North Side ===
Another group of residences, known as the North Side, is located in the northwest corner of Danforth Campus. Only open to upperclassmen and January Scholars, the North Side consists of Millbrook Apartments, The Village, Village East, and all fraternity houses except the Zeta Beta Tau house, which is off campus. Sororities at Washington University do not have houses by their own accord. The Village is a group of residences where students who have similar interests or academic goals apply as small groups of 4 to 24, known as BLOCs, to live together in clustered suites, as well as non-BLOC students. Like the South 40, the residences around the Village also surround a recreational lawn as well as its own student center.

== Greek life ==
Washington University in St. Louis has 26 fraternal organizations on-campus.

=== Washington University Interfraternity Council ===
The Washington University in St. Louis Interfraternity Council is responsible for overseeing the ten fraternities on campus, including:

- Alpha Delta Phi
- Alpha Epsilon Pi
- Beta Theta Pi
- Kappa Sigma
- Sigma Alpha Epsilon
- Sigma Chi
- Sigma Nu
- Sigma Phi Epsilon
- Tau Kappa Epsilon
- Theta Xi
- Zeta Beta Tau

=== Washington University Women's Panhellenic Council ===
The Women's Panhellenic Council at Washington University oversees the six member sororities that reside on campus, including:

- Alpha Epsilon Phi
- Alpha Phi
- Chi Omega
- Gamma Phi Beta
- Kappa Delta
- Kappa Kappa Gamma

=== Washington University National Pan-Hellenic Council ===
The National Pan-Hellenic Council at Washington University oversees nine historically-Black fraternal organizations with three campus-based chapters and six city-wide chapters, including:

- Alpha Phi Alpha
- Alpha Kappa Alpha
- Kappa Alpha Psi
- Omega Psi Phi
- Delta Sigma Theta
- Phi Beta Sigma
- Zeta Phi Beta
- Sigma Gamma Rho
- Iota Phi Theta

=== National Association of Latino Fraternal Organizations, Inc., (NALFO) ===
Alpha Psi Lambda Fraternity, Incorporated is the only Latinx and co-ed fraternal organization on the campus of Washington University in St. Louis.

- Alpha Psi Lambda

== A Cappella ==
There are 11 a cappella groups on WashU's campus, specializing in everything from contemporary rock and pop music to jazz standards and Disney songs. A cappella groups on campus include After Dark, The Stereotypes, The Amateurs, The Pikers, The Aristocats, More Fools Than Wise, The Ghost Lights, The Mosaic Whispers, The Sensasians, Staam, and the Greenleafs.

== Honoraries ==
- Lock & Chain Sophomore Honorary
- Lambda Sigma
- ThurtenE Honorary
- Chimes Junior Honorary
- Mortar Board
- Luminescence Honorary
