= Crow Observatory =

Astronomical observatory in St. Louis, Missouri, United States

Coordinates: 38°38′57″N 90°18′19″W

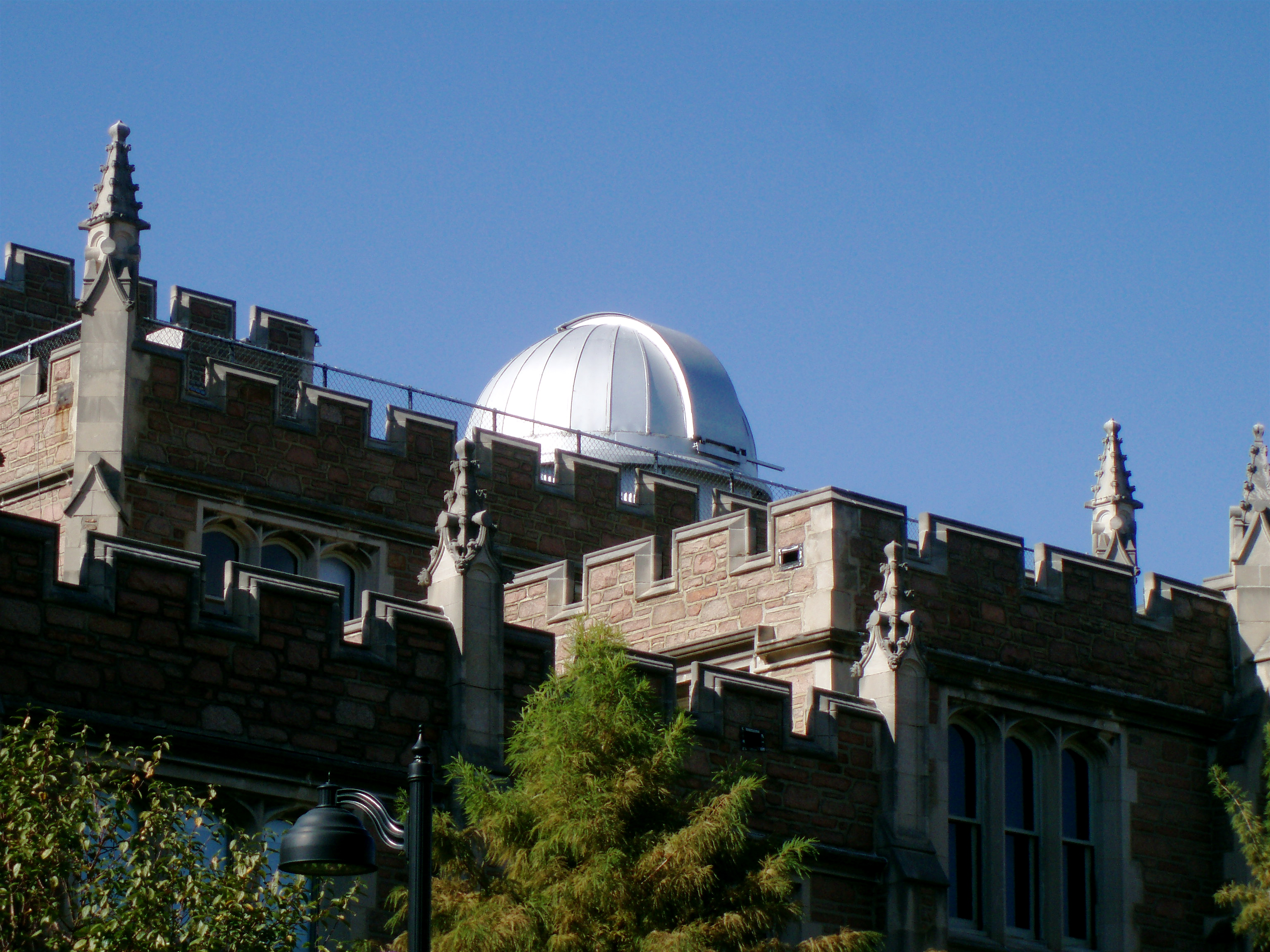
Crow Observatory dome

Crow Observatory is a historic observatory housed in the Crow Hall in the Physics Department on the Danforth Campus of Washington University in St. Louis. The historic telescope is still in use, and the observatory is open to the public.

== Telescope and transit ==
The university purchased the observatory's refractor telescope in 1863. The telescope is named the Yeatman Refractor after the philanthropist James Yeatman, who donated $1,500 in 1857 (equivalent to more than $55,000 in 2025) for its construction at the university's inauguration. The Yeatman Refractor has an aperture of 6 inches, with lenses made by Henry Fitz & Co. The transit was made in 1882, and the clock was made in 1885.

== History ==
The observatory was originally located on 18th Street in St. Louis City; it was moved with the rest of the university to the Danforth Campus upon the conclusion of the 1904 World's Fair. The current observatory dome was built in 1954, when the Yeatman Refractor telescope was relocated from where Louderman Hall currently stands.

== See also ==
- List of astronomical observatories
