= Washington University Hilltop Campus Historic District =

Historic district in Missouri, United States

- U.S. National Register of Historic Places
- U.S. National Historic Landmark District
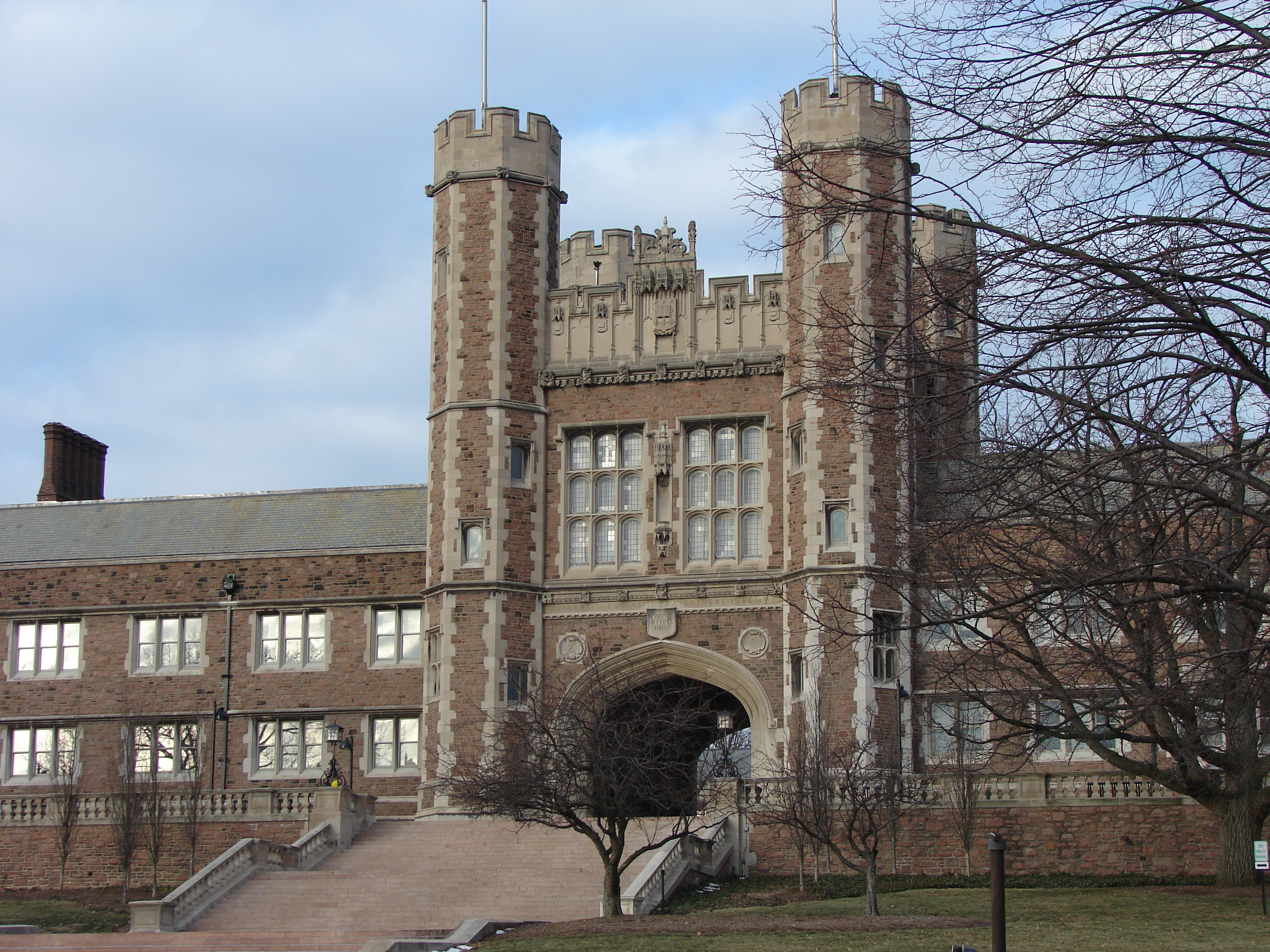

- Location within St. Louis Location within Missouri Location within the United States
- Location: St. Louis, Missouri
- Coordinates: 38°38′54″N 90°18′35″W
- Built: 1900
- Architect: Jamieson & Spearl
- Architectural style: Late Gothic Revival
- NRHP reference No.: 79003636

Significant dates
- Added to NRHP: January 12, 1979
- Designated NHLD: February 27, 1987

The Washington University Hilltop Campus Historic District was the site of the 1904 Louisiana Purchase Exposition and the 1904 Summer Olympics. Many of the exposition buildings were temporary in nature, but a number of permanent structures were built and are used by Washington University, which calls this area the Danforth Campus. The district includes more than fifty structures, of which twenty are in the Collegiate Gothic style.

The overall plan for the Washington University campus was conceived by Olmsted, Olmsted and Eliot in 1895, and a national competition was held in 1899 for the new buildings. Cope and Stewardson of Philadelphia was the winning firm, drawing on experience gained at Bryn Mawr College, the University of Pennsylvania and Princeton University. As construction proceeded, plans for the Louisiana Purchase Exposition incorporated the new buildings, leasing the campus and providing funding for more buildings.

The Collegiate Gothic structures form a unified composition, despite their construction over a fifty-year period. This is attributed to a style guide compiled by architect James P. Jamieson, who defined the use of red granite, green slate shingles and copper flashing and drainage details. Windows are set in limestone surrounds. Buildings are typically sited around a quadrangle that forms a high point, so that the building elevations facing the quad are two stories, while the rear elevations are three stories. Plans are standardized with many buildings using an elongated H-shaped plan with a central tower of three to five stories.

University buildings included:

- Brookings Hall (1900), the defining landmark on Washington University campus, used as the Exposition's administration building.
- Busch Hall (1900), used for the fair's Division of Works, including architects, engineers and construction management.
- Ridgley Library (1901), used by the British Government for the display of items from Queen Victoria's Diamond Jubilee.
- Eads Hall (1902), used by the Board of Lady Managers.
- Cupples Hall I (1901), used for anthropology, including mummies in the basement.
- Cupples Hall II(1901), used for the Jefferson Guard, the fair's security apparatus.
- Prince Hall (1901)
- Karl D. Umrath Hall (1902), used as a guest dormitory
- Francis Gymnasium (1902) and Francis Field (1902-1903), used for displays of physical culture and the Third Olympic Games.

Later compatible additions include McMillan Hall (1906), Graham Chapel (1907), Newton R. Wilson Memorial Hall (1923), Duncker Hall (1923), Grace Vallé January Hall (1923), Charles Rebstock Hall (1926), the Ann W. Olin Women's Building (1927), Wayman Crow Hall (1933), George Warren Brown Memorial Hall (1935), the Sever Institute of Technology (1948) and Louderman Hall (1951).

Other buildings constructed for the Exposition include:

- The Palace of Fine Art, designed by architect Cass Gilbert, featured a grand interior sculpture court based on the Roman Baths of Caracalla. Standing at the top of Art Hill, it now serves as the home of the St. Louis Art Museum.
- The Missouri State building was planned as a permanent structure, but it burned down on November 18, and since the fair was almost over it was not rebuilt. After the fair, the World's Fair Pavilion was built on the site of the Missouri building.
- Completed in 1913, the Jefferson Memorial building was built near the main entrance to the Exposition, at Lindell and DeBalivere. It was built with proceeds from the fair, to commemorate Thomas Jefferson, who initiated the Louisiana Purchase, and to store the Exposition's records and archives. It is now home to the Missouri History Museum.
