= Walk In Lay Down =

Annual concert event

Walk In Lay Down (commonly referred to as WILD) is an annual concert event held at Washington University in St. Louis and has been a campus tradition since its inception in 1978. WILD, produced by the WUSTL Social Programming Board, is sponsored by the Washington University Student Union and is the largest student-run event at the university. WILD is free to university undergraduate students and has rooted itself in the campus culture as an exciting time of the semester for students of the university to get together and celebrate free live music, food, and friends.

== History ==
WILD was first held in 1978 and was originally presented as a movie screening event. Around the 1980s, the event then expanded to incorporate musical acts to accompany the movies. By the early 1990s, the movies were dropped altogether and WILD became the music festival that it is now. In 2013, production of WILD was passed on from student group Team 31 Productions to the WUSTL Social Programming Board.

WILD was built on a history of Washington University hosting great music including Ray Charles (1959), The Righteous Brothers (1966), The Temptations (1966), the Kingsmen, Simon and Garfunkel (1967) the Loving Spoonful (1967), the Yardbirds (1967), the Grateful Dead (1969), the Velvet Underground (1969), Jethro Tull (1970), Sly and the Family Stone (1973), Frank Zappa (1977), the Replacements (1987), BB King (1987).

The event is named for an old tradition in which students would bring sofas into the quad and lie on them while watching the performances. Although this tradition is no longer allowed, in Fall 2007 the university permitted inflatable couches to be allowed in the quad during the concert in an attempt to revive the tradition. Student Life, the university's newspaper, has published an op-ed pointing out that the name is not grammatically correct.

Due to the university hosting the second 2016 presidential candidate debate on October 9, Fall WILD 2016 was cancelled for the first time in 30 years.

In 2017, an "alternative WILD" was staged in protest of the headliner act, Lil Dicky. A walkout was staged followed the performance by the opener, Lizzo.

T-Pain was meant to headline Spring WILD 2019 but pulled out at the last minute due to a mandatory vocal rest. Roy Woods was booked as last minute as an additional performer as Loud Luxury was bumped to headliner. Elley Duhé was also meant to perform, but had to cancel.

Due to the COVID-19 Pandemic in 2020, the university suspended in-person classes, requiring students to remain home for the remainder of the Spring 2020 semester, causing Spring WILD 2020 to be cancelled. Subsequent WILD events were also cancelled before finally returning to campus in Spring 2022 with headliner Zedd.

== Past WILD performers ==
The following is a chronology of past WILD performers.

Semester	Headliner	Other Performer(s)
Spring 2026	The Kid Laroi	MKTO
Spring 2025	Flo Rida	Mustard
Spring 2024	Joey Bada$$ (at diminished capacity due to safety and weather concerns)	Iyaz, Non-Euclidian Geometry
Spring 2023	Flo Milli	Peach Tree Rascals
Fall 2022	Cancelled due to safety concerns	
Spring 2022	Zedd	IDK, Chris Mardini
Fall 2021	Cancelled due to COVID-19 pandemic	
Spring 2021	Cancelled due to COVID-19 pandemic	
Fall 2020	Cancelled due to COVID-19 pandemic	
Spring 2020	Cancelled due to COVID-19 pandemic	
Fall 2019	A$AP Ferg	Kiiara, Mindchatter, Gosha Guppy
Spring 2019	Loud Luxury	Roy Wood$
Fall 2018	Carly Rae Jepsen	Tinashe
Spring 2018	Young the Giant	Dizzy Wright, Molly Kate Kestner
Fall 2017	Lil Dicky	ARIZONA, Lizzo
Spring 2017	Jason Derulo	Natalie La Rose, Vanic
Fall 2016	Cancelled due to Presidential Debate	
Spring 2016	The All-American Rejects	The Knocks
Fall 2015	Kygo	Magic Man
Spring 2015	Mac Miller	Botnek, Clockwork DJ, Choo Jackson
Fall 2014	Icona Pop	GRiZ, Five Knives, Lowell
Spring 2014	Childish Gambino	3lau
Fall 2013	Chance the Rapper	Karmin
Spring 2013	Atmosphere	Mat Kearney, Yeasayer
Fall 2012	Wolfgang Gartner	Popeska, Pierce Fulton
Spring 2012	Fitz and the Tantrums	Dum Dum Girls, Petra and the Priorities
Fall 2011	Mike Posner	The White Panda, Moosh and Twist
Spring 2011	Edward Sharpe and the Magnetic Zeros	Flying Lotus
Fall 2010	Wale	Amanda Blank, Major Lazer
Spring 2010	Cold War Kids	Shwayze, Sobriquet
Fall 2009	Method Man and Redman	Passion Pit, K'naan, Deskhop
Spring 2009	The Black Keys	The Cool Kids, B.o.B, Filligar
Fall 2008	Talib Kweli	David Banner, Little Brother, Kid Sister, Nite Owl, Maromio
Spring 2008	George Clinton and the P-Funk All-Stars	Under the Influence of Giants, Will Hoge
Fall 2007	Lupe Fiasco	DJ Unk, Sugarhill Gang, Kid Beyond
Spring 2007	OK GO	Reel Big Fish, Cut Chemist
Fall 2006	Guster	Rahzel, Eliot Morris
Spring 2006	Ben Folds	Matt Nathanson, Duncan Sheik, The Feed
Fall 2005	Lil' Jon & the Eastside Boyz	Lil' Scrappy, The Quor, Stevie Stone, Toyy
Spring 2005	Robert Randolph & the Family Band	Sister Hazel, Michael Kelsey, The Hatch
Fall 2004	Ozomatli	Nappy Roots, Murphy Lee
Spring 2004	Live	Lucky Boys Confusion, Ingram Hill, The Hatch
Fall 2003	Busta Rhymes	Talib Kweli, Sac Lunch
Spring 2003	Better Than Ezra	Tony Lang Band, Sac Lunch
Fall 2002	The Black Eyed Peas	Jurassic 5
Spring 2002	Jurassic 5	Everclear
Fall 2001	Benefit for 9/11	
Spring 2001	Crazy Town	Eve 6, Saliva
Fall 2000	The Roots	Javier Mendoza Band
Spring 2000	Outkast	Dispatch, Matt Bar
Fall 1999	G. Love & Special Sauce	Argonaut Tour, Nathanael's Creed
Spring 1999	They Might Be Giants	The Coup
Fall 1998	King Floyd	
Spring 1998	Stir	The Getaway People, Original Blunted Soldier, Orange Tree
Fall 1997	De La Soul	Rondo's Blues Deluxe, Five Star and the Inhalations
Spring 1997	The Samples	The Scofflaws, The Guts
Fall 1996	Souls of Mischief	Isaac Green and the Skalars
Spring 1996	Porno for Pyros	The Roots
Fall 1995	Guided by Voices	Man or Astroman, Poster Children, Trouser
Spring 1995	The Pharcyde	Lowey Bridge
Fall 1994	Morphine	Veruca Salt, Reggae at Will, The Charles Minnow Experience
Spring 1994	Lords of the Underground	El Caribe Tropical, Luna
Fall 1993	They Might Be Giants	Pere Ubu, Mercy Me
Spring 1993	Widespread Panic	Flowerhead, Wagon
Fall 1992	The Spin Doctors	
Spring 1992	A Tribe Called Quest	
Fall 1991	Warren Zevon	Trip Shakespeare; Movie: Silence of the Lambs
Spring 1991	De La Soul	Main Source, Dry Bachelors
Fall 1990	Henry Lee Sumner	
Spring 1990	The BoDeans	Evil Sulu, Pedestrians
Fall 1989	The Romantics	Movie: Who Framed Roger Rabbit?
Spring 1989	The Risk	Suede Caesar; Movie: Silence of the Lambs
Fall 1988	The Romantics	Three Merry Widows; Movie: Ghostbusters
Spring 1988	Otis Day and the Knights	Alazone, The Happy Children; Movie: The Sure Thing
Fall 1987	Steve Earle & The Dukes	The Stranded Lads; Movie: The Blues Brothers
Spring 1987	Jason and the Scorchers	Rondo's Blues Deluxe; Comedian: Eric Kornfeld; Movie: Ferris Bueller's Day Off
Fall 1986	The Busboys	Kool Ray and the Polaroidz; Movie: An American Werewolf in London
Spring 1986	Dickey Betts, Gregg Allman	Jake's Leg; Movie: Cheech & Chong's Up in Smoke
Fall 1985	Pure Prairie League	Movie: Fast Times at Ridgemont High
Spring 1985	Chuck Berry	Movie: Romancing the Stone
Fall 1984		
Spring 1984	REM (in Graham Chapel)	
Fall 1981	The Pretenders (at Graham Chapel)	
Spring 1981	U2 (in Graham Chapel)	
Spring 1978	Asleep at the Wheel	

== See also ==
Campus life at Washington University in St. Louis
