= After Dark (Washington University in St. Louis) =

American a cappella group

Washington University After Dark
- Origin: Washington University in St. Louis
- Genre: A cappella
- Years active: 2001 – present

After Dark (AD) is a co-ed a cappella group at Washington University in St. Louis specializing in contemporary rock and pop music.

== History ==
After Dark has been singing at Washington University since September 2001. The group was founded by former members Laura Butler, Cara Shugoll, Greg Hitt, and Erin Hickey. After Dark has performed at various venues, including St. Louis University, University of Illinois, University of Wisconsin–Madison, the St. Louis Symphony Orchestra, on the nationally syndicated Steve & DC Morning Show, at the St. Louis Club, on MSNBC's Hardball during coverage of the 2004 Presidential Debates, and on CBS's The Early Show during the 2008 Vice-Presidential Debates.

In the spring of 2005, After Dark was awarded Midwest divisional runner-up at the International Championship of Collegiate A Cappella at the University of Illinois competition, where they also received the Outstanding Soloist award for Julie Kling's performance of “Gotta Be.” After Dark's runner-up position allowed the group to advance to the Midwest Semi-Finals of the competition. In August 2005, After Dark released its first studio album, entitled Whoa Bundy. The opening track, "I Want You Back," was chosen for the CAMO compilation Top Shelf A Cappella Volume II. After Dark's second studio album, Eclipse, was released in August 2007 to critical acclaim. The group's third album, Aftermath, was released in February 2011.

After Dark puts on an annual concert, "A Light From the Darkness," in Washington University's Graham Chapel each January. They hold auditions at the beginning of each fall semester. Since 2006, they have participated in an annual charitable benefit concert known as "Rhythms for Rebuilding."

== Recent Recognition ==
After Dark's second studio album, "Eclipse," was released in August 2007, and reviewed by the Recorded A Cappella Review Board. The track "Snakes on a Plane [Bring It]" received a perfect score and was described as "one of the best tracks of the year" by reviewer Jevan Soo (RARB). Later, the song "Mama's Room" was chosen for the compilations "Voices Only 2007" (Voices Only) and "Sing IV" (SING). "Ready for Love" was chosen for "Voices Only 2008", and "Worn Me Down" was chosen for an AcaTunes Favorites award ().

In 2008, After Dark was recognized by the Contemporary A Cappella Recording Awards, presented by the Contemporary A Cappella Society (CASA), for tracks off Eclipse: "Mama's Room" won for Best Co-Ed Collegiate Song and was named runner-up for Best Co-Ed Collegiate Arrangement. Jazzy Danziger was nominated for the Best Mixed Solo Award for her performance of "Ready for Love" (CASA).

Awards and Compilations
Year	Presenter	Award	Result
2005	International Championship of Collegiate A Cappella Midwest Quarterfinal	Overall	2nd place
2005	International Championship of Collegiate A Cappella Midwest Quarterfinal	Outstanding soloist	Julie Kling, "Gotta Be"
2005	CAMO Top Shelf A Cappella II	"I Want You Back" from Whoa Bundy	
2007	Voices Only 2007	"Mama's Room" from Eclipse	
2007	Sing IV	"Mama's Room" from Eclipse	
2007	Acatunes.com Award	"Worn Me Down" from Eclipse	
2008	Voices Only 2008	"Ready for Love" from Eclipse	
2008	CARA Award Nominations	Best Mixed Collegiate Solo	Jazzy Danziger, "Ready for Love"
2008	CARA Awards	Best Mixed Collegiate Song	"Mama's Room" (Winner)
2008	CARA Awards	Best Mixed Collegiate Arrangement	Jazzy Danziger, "Mama's Room" (Runner-up)
2024	International Championship of Collegiate A Cappella Midwest Quarterfinal	Overall	3rd place

== Albums ==
=== Whoa Bundy (2005) ===
1. I Want You Back (Jackson Five)
2. Such Great Heights (The Postal Service)
3. Flake (Jack Johnson)
4. Fallin' (Alicia Keys)
5. And So It Goes (Billy Joel)
6. You Can Call Me Al (Paul Simon)
7. Little Man (Eddie from Ohio)
8. Disarm (Smashing Pumpkins)
9. Down in the River to Pray (Alison Krauss)
10. I'll Take You There (General Public)
11. Trashin' the Camp (Phil Collins and 'N Sync)
12. You Gotta Be (Des'ree)

=== Eclipse (2007) ===
1. Snakes on a Plane [Bring It] (Cobra Starship)
2. Mama's Room (Under the Influence of Giants)
3. Worn Me Down (Rachael Yamagata)
4. Ready for Love (India.Arie)
5. Who's Lovin' You (The Jackson Five)
6. Beautiful (Joydrop)
7. Hiro's Song (Ben Folds)
8. When I'm 64 (The Beatles)
9. Don't Stop Believin' (Journey)
10. Hard To Say Goodbye To Yesterday (Boyz II Men)
11. When I Fall (Barenaked Ladies)

=== Aftermath (2011) ===
1. Please Don't Leave Me (P!nk)
2. Not Ready to Make Nice (The Dixie Chicks)
3. Through the Fire and Flames (DragonForce)
4. Grace Kelly (Mika)
5. Put Your Records On (Corinne Bailey Rae)
6. Semi-Charmed Life (Third Eye Blind)
7. Fidelity (Regina Spektor)
8. Across the Universe (The Beatles)
9. I'm Yours (Jason Mraz)
10. Recant (an original by Stephen Harrison and Colleen Davis of After Dark)
11. Stolen (Dashboard Confessional)
12. Shake It (Metro Station)

=== 'til Dawn (2013) ===
1. Bottom of the Rivers (Delta Rae)
2. Promise This (Cheryl Cole)
3. Resistance (Muse)
4. Soon We'll Be Found (Sia)
5. Undo It (Carrie Underwood)
6. This Woman's Work (Kate Bush)
7. Bleeding Love (Leona Lewis)
8. Shark in the Water (V V Brown)
9. Parachute (Cheryl Cole)
10. Say When (The Fray)
11. Rolling in the Deep (Adele)
