= Asset-based welfare =

Asset-based welfare is an economic theory of poverty and precarity eradication based upon the redistribution of productive assets in an economy rather than income.

== History ==
During the American revolution and the French revolution in the eighteenth century, Thomas Paine, an American Revolutionary, and Antoine-Nicolas Condorcet, French philosopher, tried to bring out ways to have a society free of poverty. But their ideas did not gather much attention as the French and American revolutionaries developed system of social democracy in which state intervention and central planning played a significant role.

The failure of central planning, during the twentieth century, made it necessary to explore alternative ideas of social democracy. It was then, that the earlier ideas of Condorcet and Paine were brought to light. The kind of social democracy which is laid down by Condorcet and Paine has an important role in capital grants. Another British historian Gareth Stedman Jones describes how asset-based welfare can be a part of social democracy and can eradicate poverty.

== Description ==
Asset-based welfare is concerned about the assets held by individuals rather than their basic income. Will Paxton argues that asset-based welfare concentrates on the stock of capital that one holds and not just the basic income. Stock of capital is the actual measure of well being. Asset-based policies can be directly compared to income policies. Although income policies are necessary as they allow the poor to maintain a livable standard of living, they are considered to be more of a alleviative measure of poverty, whereas, asset-based welfare is considered to be a preventive measure of poverty.

Asset-based welfare requires that assets in the economy should be redistributed such that the inequality in the ownership of assets between the rich and the poor is narrowed. It is necessary to solve this issue of inequality in distribution of assets as this lays ground for inequality in all other aspects. The first asset-based welfare policy was the child trust fund introduced in Britain. Another example is the saving gateway.

== Asset-based policies ==
Asset-based welfare states that an economy can achieve a path towards prosperity if the individuals of the economy accumulate and acquire assets. It is difficult for the poor to accumulate assets as a substantial portion of their income is spent on consumption with very less or no income left to save.

Robert Skidelsky argues that the individuals in an economy should receive an unconditional grant of resources (stock of capital) which will give the poor a platform to reach a standard of living from where they can move forward on their own towards prosperity.

This grant of resources can be attained by redistribution, that is transfer from the rich to the poor. Redistribution should be undertaken till the point where the negative marginal utility of the rich by sacrifice of some assets (or income) exactly offsets the positive marginal utility of the poor by gaining of assets.

Caroline Moser and Anis A. Dani, in their book Assets, Livelihoods and Social Policy explain that asset-based policies provides needy households the means and opportunities to accumulate assets and have greater control over their livelihoods. Asset-based policies may be of use to households which depend on their own assets for their livelihood. To avoid inequality, the policies need to focus on creating an asset base for the poor. In order for the individuals, especially the poor, to have access to assets, it becomes necessary to broaden interest in public policies, public investments and public intervention. To be successful, an asset-based policy should overcome challenges such as initial inequality, unorganized sectors of the economy, imbalance in asset building and inadequate state effectiveness.

To have a sustainable development based on asset-based policies, public intervention is important to increase access to assets such as land, housing and credit. Secondly, infrastructural investments are required which ensure better access to services, energy and market opportunities which increase the returns on assets that public holds. Finally, policies which create a healthy investment environment which can directly affect the livelihood of the poor should be framed.

Ownership of an asset generates basic income. Moreover, it encourages individuals to save more for future which ultimately leads towards the achievement and accumulation of personal wealth. This makes individuals economically independent. Michael Sherraden explains that assets give people the opportunity to realize their maximum potential and to escape poverty. Will Paxton adds that asset-based approach helps to escape poverty or prevent it before it happens.

== Empirical evidences ==
Mark Schreiner, Margaret Clancy and Michael Sherraden (2002) conducted a research study at the George Warren Brown School of Social Work's Center for Social Development at Washington University in St. Louis on Individual Development Accounts (IDA), an asset-based policy. It was found that IDA led to asset building in the lower income group. It was also observed that individuals were able to plan and implement their financial goals.

Another research study by Prof Elaine Kempson, Stephen McKay and Sharon Collard (2003) from the Personal Finance Research Centre at the University of Bristol on the savings gateway proves that asset-based policies encourage the poor to save.

== See also ==
- Asset-based egalitarianism
- Child Trust Fund
