= Prosperity Now =

Political think tank

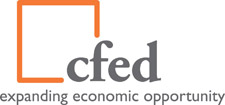
- Formation: 1979; 47 years ago
- Type: Public Policy Think Tank
- Headquarters: 1200 G Street NW
- Location: Washington, D.C.
- President: Andrea Levere
- Revenue: $11,675,289 (2015)
- Expenses: $13,020,430 (2015)
- Website: prosperitynow.org

Prosperity Now, formerly known as the Corporation for Enterprise Development (CFED), is a national nonprofit based in Washington, DC, dedicated to expanding economic opportunity for low-income families and communities in the United States. Prosperity Now uses an approach grounded in community practice, public policy, and private markets. The organization publishes research, partners with local practitioners to carry out demonstration projects, and engages in local, state, and national policy advocacy work. The organization works domestically with satellite offices in San Francisco, California, and Durham, North Carolina.

== History ==
CFED was founded in 1979 by Bob Friedman. Initially, the organization focused on economic development and microenterprise. It worked to reduce unemployment and expand opportunity by advocating for policies that would make it easier for entrepreneurs to start or expand a small business. In 1988, CFED launched the Development Report Card (DRC) for the States, a broad-based report that used multiple indicators to rate the economies of all 50 states. The DRC was widely used across the field and provided policymakers and businesses with a comparative measure to assess each state's business climate. The DRC was retired in 2007 and was replaced with the Assets & Opportunity Scorecard.

CFED was one of the first champions of Individual Development Accounts (IDA) – matched savings accounts that help low-income people save for a particular goal, such as buying a home, paying for post-secondary education, or starting or expanding a small business. In 1997, CFED launched the American Dream Demonstration, which was the first large-scale test of IDAs as a social and economic development tool. After seeing the success of IDAs, Congress passed the Assets for Independence Act (AFIA), providing $125 million over five years to fund IDAs. The AFI Program is administered by the Office of Community Services, within the U.S. Department of Health and Human Services, Administration for Children and Families. CFED is well known in the field as the expert on Individual Development Accounts, as well as other asset building programs and policies.

== Policy influence ==
- Individual Development Accounts
- CFED is one of the organizations leading efforts to pass the Saver's Credit Expansion and recently launched the Saver's Credit Alliance, a coalition of the corporate sector, the nonprofit sector and national organizations who support the expansion. On January 28, 2010, President Barack Obama announced that he plans to include an expansion of the Saver's Credit in his 2011 budget as a component of the agenda of the Middle Class Working Families Task Force, as well as in the State of the Union. The Saver's Credit will increase the net worth and retirement security of as many as 50 million low- to moderate-income working American families and could increase their assets by as much as $44 billion. Reform measures supported by the Administration and Congress would benefit more than 50 million Americans, including providing a flat 50% match on deposits into qualified retirement accounts up to $1,000/$500 per year for joint/single filer, automatically depositing this match directly into a designated account through submission of IRS Form 8888, extend this benefit to households earning less than $65,000. An expanded Saver's Credit will build on the expansion of automatic enrollment in employer-sponsored accounts and employer innovation for automatic enrollment into IRAs to enable families to build a larger nest egg for their retirement and for other eligible uses.

== Policy advocacy ==
- The Savings for Working Families Act (SWFA) would make IDAs available to as many as 2.7 million low-income Americans. IDAs are matched savings accounts that help low-income families build appreciating assets and become financially self-reliant.
- Children's Savings Accounts (CSAs) are financial products that seek to expand economic and educational opportunities for children by encouraging long‐term planning, building family wealth, and promoting financial literacy.
- Manufactured Housing Reform

== Programs ==
=== Assets Learning Conference ===
CFED holds a biennial Assets Learning Conference. The conference brings together over a thousand leaders in the asset building field to discuss ways that assets can help create prosperity and expand economic opportunity for Americans.

=== Assets & Opportunity Network ===
CFED's national Assets & Opportunity Network is a movement-oriented group of advocates, practitioners, policymakers, and others nationwide working to expand the reach and deepen the impact of asset-based strategies. Network members are on the frontlines of state and local policy advocacy, coalition-building, and service delivery. The purpose of this Network is to serve as both a learning community and an advocacy community – to enhance member capacity to advocate and deliver asset services and foster growth of assets movement leading to opportunities at scale. The Network is a hub of action for local, state, and federal policy advocacy and program implementation.

=== Assets & Opportunity Scorecard ===
The Assets & Opportunity Scorecard gives a comprehensive look at Americans' financial security and assesses all states' relative ability to provide opportunities for residents to build and retain assets. It assesses the 50 states and the District of Columbia on 135 outcome and policy measures, which describe how well residents are faring and what states can do to help them build and protect assets. These measures are grouped into five issue areas: Financial Assets & Income, Businesses & Jobs, Housing & Homeownership, Health Care, and Education.
