= Andrew Gamble =

British academic and author (born 1947)

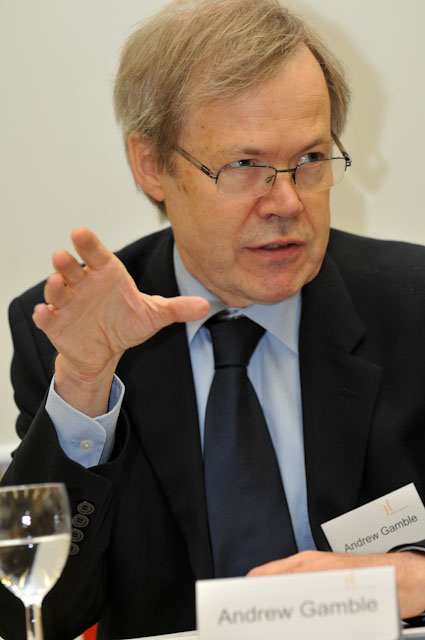
- Gamble in 2009
- Born: Andrew Michael Gamble; 15 August 1947 (age 79)

Academic background
- Education: University of Cambridge (BA, PhD); Durham University (MA)

Academic work
- Discipline: Political studies
- Sub-discipline: Political economy; political theory
- Institutions: University of Sheffield; Queens' College, Cambridge

Andrew Michael Gamble FRSA FBA FAcSS (born 15 August 1947) is a British scholar of politics. He was Professor of Politics at the University of Cambridge and Fellow of Queens' College from 2007 to 2014. He was a member of the Department of Politics at the University of Sheffield (1973–2007), for many years as a professor and rejoined the department in 2014.

A pupil of Brighton College, he studied economics at Queens' College, Cambridge, before gaining his Master of Arts degree in political theory from the University of Durham. He then returned to Gonville and Caius College, Cambridge, for his doctorate in social and political sciences, which he received in 1975.

While at Sheffield University, he was a founder, member and Director of the Political Economy Research Centre (PERC), Chairman of the Department of Politics (twice), and Pro-Vice Chancellor of the university. He received his Chair in Politics in 1986.

In 2005 he was awarded the Sir Isaiah Berlin Award for Lifetime Contribution to Political Studies by the PSA. His 2003 book, Between Europe and America, won the W. J. M. Mackenzie prize for the best book published in political science in 2003. He is co-editor (with the former Labour MP Tony Wright) of the academic journal The Political Quarterly, and he also sits on the editorial board of another academic journal, Representation. The main themes of his recent research have been asset-based welfare and "Anglo-America". His most recent book, an analysis of the politics of recession and capitalist crises, is entitled The Spectre at the Feast.

== Honours ==
Gamble was elected a Fellow of the British Academy (FBA) in 2000, and a Fellow of the Academy of Social Sciences (FAcSS) in 2002.

== Published works ==
Single-authored books:

- The Conservative Nation (1974)
- An Introduction to Modern Social and Political Thought (1981)
- Britain in Decline (1981, 4th Edition 1994)
- The Free Economy and the Strong State (1988, 2nd edition 1994)
- Hayek: The Iron Cage of Liberty (1996)
- Politics and Fate (2000)
- Between Europe and America: The Future of British Politics (2003)
- The Spectre at the Feast (2009)
- Crisis Without End? The Unravelling of Western Prosperity (2014)
- Can the Welfare State Survive? (2016)

Co-authored books:

- From Alienation to Surplus Value (with Paul Walton) (1976)
- Capitalism in Crisis (with Paul Walton) (1976)
- The British Party System and Economic Policy 1945–1983 (with S. A. Walkland) (1984)
- Ideas, Interests & Consequences (1989)

Books edited/ co-edited:

- Developments in British Politics (Series 1–7, 1983–2003)
- The Social Economy and the Democratic State (1989)
- Regionalism & World Order (1996)
- Stakeholder Capitalism (1997)
- Fundamentals in British Politics (1999)
- The New Social Democracy (1999)
- Marxism and Social Science (1999)
- The Political Economy of the Company (2000)
- Restating the State? (2004)
- Labour, the State, Social Movements and the Challenge of Neo-liberal Globalisation (2007)

Awards
Vacant Title last held by István Mészáros	Deutscher Memorial Prize; 1972; With: Paul Walton	Succeeded by Lucio Colletti
Preceded by Ivor Crewe	Sir Isaiah Berlin Prize; 2005	Succeeded by Quentin Skinner
