= Saving for Education, Entrepreneurship, and Downpayment =

Long-term savings and investment account policy and practice endeavor

Saving for Education, Entrepreneurship, and Downpayment (SEED) Policy and Practice Initiative is an American long-term savings and investment account policy and practice endeavor that develops, tests and impels matched savings accounts and financial education for children and youth. The SEED accounts are installed at birth with an initial deposit of $1,000, and accumulates over the span of a lifetime. All the money will be invested in children’s savings accounts for future purposes.

Established in 2003, the SEED initiative accrues deposits from family, friends, and accountholders themselves, as well as augmented by other public and private sources. Each voluntary contribution from any public or private sector should be invented by a public match that increases in value over time for lower-income families.

== Requirements ==
Any SEED account policy should encompass the following specifications:

- Inclusive: Accounts should be established at birth for every child in America.
- Seeded with an initial deposit: Every newborn should receive a modest but significant start-in-life deposit.
- Configured to establish lifelong assets: Savings should be held until at least age 18 and should be used for only higher education/training, small business development, home purchase, or retirement.
- Matched progressively: Voluntary additional contributions from any public or private source (e.g. family, friends, relatives, community organizations, and parents' employers) should be invented by a public match that increases in value for lower-income families.
- Simplicity: Parameters of the account should be kept as simple as possible to enable low-cost, high- scale delivery (e.g. simple match rates, tax incentives, deposit structure, integration into tax forms).
- Private-market oriented: Accounts should be held primarily in private financial institutions that provide limited investment options.
- Savings should be used to build financial aspirations, knowledge, and skills: Age-appropriate financial education should be delivered by a variety of sources (e.g. financial institutions, nonprofit organizations, youth development organizations, schools, and families).
- Non-discriminatory to welfare participants: Eligibility for means-tested programs should not be affected by savings in SEED accounts.

== Investment Results ==
By initially investing $1,000 for a child at birth with a 6% rate of return will yield a resulted investment of $3,000 after 18 years. Additionally, adding $100 per year onto the base will accrue up to $5,000. By adding $50 a month to the slated $1,000 base will return more than $22,000.

The financial sum of $3,000 - $22,000 can be seen as a financial catalyst to fueling a child’s college education. Typically, costs to attend a 2-year college are just below $2,000 a year and a 4-year public colleges are just under $4,000 a year.

== See also ==
- Child Trust Fund
- Individual Development Accounts
- The American Dream Demonstration
