= Center for Social Development =

Research center at Washington University in St. Louis

The Center for Social Development (CSD) is a research center at Washington University's George Warren Brown School of Social Work. Its focus is on innovations in asset-building and social development practice and policy.

== History ==
In 1991, Michael Sherraden published Assets and the Poor: A New American Welfare Policy, which proposed using asset-building policy as a community development strategy. Shanti Khinduka, the dean of the Brown School, was impressed by Sherraden's ideas and invited him to direct a new research institution, the Center for Social Development. CSD was opened in 1994.

CSD designed and implemented the American Dream Demonstration, the first systematic test of asset-building policy in the United States. Since that time, CSD has participated in several large-scale demonstrations of asset building, including one testing Children's Development Accounts in Oklahoma and another testing Youth Savings Accounts in developing countries. The Center has also broadened its focus to include civic engagement and service, productive aging, and community development.

CSD has published more than 250 publications, including working papers, research and policy reports, and Congressional testimonies.

== Areas of inquiry ==
=== Asset building ===
In the 1990s, CSD defined asset building as a new direction in social policy. Asset building research at CSD has informed and influenced legislation in the states and at the federal level. Specifically, the United States has implemented matched savings for millions of low-income families through Individual Development Account Programs supported by the Assets for Independence project, as well as universal and progressive Child Development Accounts (CDAs). An experimental test of CDAs between 2003 and 2013 known as SEED has had major policy impacts in the US. At least six countries have CDAs covering all or much of the child population. In addition, CSD has consulted with top government officials in designing major asset-based policies in the United Kingdom, Canada, China, Korea, Indonesia, Uganda, Mexico, and other countries. Large, global research projects at CSD have been the driving force. A large research project with Youth Savings Accounts in four developing countries is underway and expected to have major impacts on national policies and international development assistance. The goal of an account for every child on the planet, first articulated by CSD, appears in discussions and agendas for international development.

=== Civic engagement and service ===
CSD works in research and policy on civic engagement and service. CSD’s research on civic service has informed policies to expand participation in domestic and international service, such as the 2009 Edward M. Kennedy Serve America Act and the 2010 Sargent Shriver International Service Act. These policies have broadened participation and engagement, creating opportunities for inter-group exchange and understanding. Civic service is emerging as a new social institution, so that service to the community, country, or world—as a teen, young adult, in the working years, or in retirement—is considered a normal part of the life course for many people.

=== Productive aging ===
CSD is also a widely recognized leader in defining and testing innovations in productive aging. Productive aging refers to making contributions to society during the older adult years. CSD has extended knowledge and influenced policy in productive aging in the US and abroad. In particular, through conferences and research, CSD has initiated this discussion in China, the most rapidly aging country in the world.

=== Thriving communities ===
In the 1990s, CSD led the Washington University initiative for the Urban Family and Community Development Program, a multi-discipline, multi-university effort to build human capital and leadership in St. Louis communities. In the 2000s, CSD facilitated multiple asset-building programs in St. Louis and across the State of Missouri. In the 2010s, CSD partnered with multidisciplinary teams, community organizations, and local governments in community development projects in St. Louis, creating a knowledge base and models that may be implemented in other St. Louis communities and beyond.

== Publications and resources ==
As an academic institution, publications are CSD’s essential products. CSD publishes work from its own research as well as research by affiliated scholars, policymakers, and practitioners. CSD maintains a working paper series, in addition to publishing research reports, policy reports, and briefs on research findings and related policy.

Several recent books, authored by CSD faculty, focus on research conducted by CSD. These include:

- Striving to Save: Creating Policies for Financial Security of Low-Income Families
- Can the Poor Save?: Saving and Asset Building in Individual Development Accounts
- Civic Service Worldwide: Impacts and Inquiry
- Asset Building and Low-Income Families

CSD also maintains online bibliographies on asset building and civic engagement and service, each referencing publications central to its respective field. These bibliographies offer online access to over 3,000 citations, many with abstracts and links to full text.
