= Assets for Independence Act =

Law funding savings accounts for low-income Americans

Assets for Independence Act (AFIA), (passed as title IV of Coats Human Services Reauthorization Act of 1998 Pub. L. 105–285 (text) (PDF)), is an American law which provides $125 million over five years to fund Individual Development Accounts (IDA). Individual Development Accounts are matched savings accounts that help low-income people save for a particular goal, such as buying a home, paying for post-secondary education, or starting or expanding a small business. In 2017 no grants were awarded in this act.

== History ==
After seeing the success of IDAs, Congress passed the Assets for Independence Act (AFIA), providing $125 million over five years to fund IDAs. The Assets for Independence Act was passed as part of the Community Opportunities, Accountability, and Training and Educational Services Act of 1998. The AFI Program is administered by the Office of Community Services, within the U.S. Department of Health and Human Services, Administration for Children and Families. There are currently hundreds of IDA programs across the United States. CFED is well known in the field as the expert on Individual Development Accounts, as well as other asset building programs and policies.
