= Baby bonds =

Publicly-funded investment account for babies

Baby bonds are a government policy in which every child receives at birth a publicly funded trust account, potentially with more generous funding for lower-income families. Economists William Darity and Darrick Hamilton proposed the policy in 2010 as a mechanism to reduce the racial wealth gap in the United States. A 2019 analysis of the proposal by Naomi Zewde projects that baby bonds would reduce the median racial wealth gap between white and black young Americans from a factor of 16 to a factor of 1.4.

One example is the now-defunct child trust fund in the United Kingdom.

In American English, the term "baby bond" can alternatively refer to a bond with a par value of $1,000 or less.

== In Hungary ==
In Hungary, babies born after December 31, 2005 receive a tax-free savings bond with a value of approximately 40,000 forints ($185 in 2005), which is kept in a special bank account until the child turns 18. Children in need receive an additional payment at age 7 and 14. Parents in Hungary can make additional tax-free deposits.

== In the United States ==
Baby bond plans have been proposed in the United States to reduce the racial wealth gap.

=== Background ===
A one-time $5,000 baby bond plan was introduced by U.S. presidential candidate Hillary Clinton during the 2008 Democratic Party presidential primaries, but the plan was later removed from her platform. Darity and Hamilton then published their article "Can 'Baby Bonds' Eliminate the Racial Wealth Gap in Putative Post-Racial America?" in the Review of Black Political Economy in 2010, which reinvigorated the consideration of baby bonds.

==== Racial wealth gap ====
The racial wealth gap in the United States is well-documented: a 2020 study by Ashman and Neumuller found, based on Survey of Consumer Finances data from 1989–2016, that the median net worth of white families was seven times greater than the median net worth of black families. Wealth begets wealth: wealthier families are more likely to finance education for their children, build ownership and stock portfolios, and bequeath wealth, which continues the cycle. A 2017 Urban Institute report quantified these impacts: among people whose parents did not attend college, those from high-wealth families were 26% more likely to attend at least two years of college than those from low-wealth families.

==== Explanations of the racial wealth gap ====
The root cause of the racial wealth gap is debated within the academic literature, with income inequality and differences in savings and homeownership rates being offered as potential causes. Even among quantitative studies, the percentage of the racial wealth gap attributed to any one of these causes varies widely. A 2016 analysis by Herring and Henderson which used data from the Survey of Consumer Finances, drew a dichotomy between cultural factors, such as savings rate, and structural factors, such as housing discrimination. Herring and Henderson found that structural factors explained more of the racial wealth gap than cultural factors, but that even if all factors between White and Black Americans were equal, the mean racial wealth gap would remain at around $155,000.

Maury Gittleman and Edward Wolff, in a 2004 study that analyzed wealth accumulation over the period of a decade, found that once income is controlled, there is not a significant racial difference in savings. Instead, Gittleman and Wolff found that the racial wealth gap would decrease if Black Americans inherited and earned at similar levels to White Americans. Multiple studies, including articles authored by Darity and Hamilton, have cited intergenerational money transfers and inheritances as the largest contributors to the racial wealth gap. In contrast, recent studies by Ashman & Neumuller and Aliprantis & Carroll took independent approaches but concluded that income disparities between racial groups, over time, formed the largest cause of the racial wealth gap. Both studies suggested focusing on policies that would reduce income disparities, but recognized the importance of multiple interventions.

=== Active plans ===
==== Federal government ====
On July 4, 2026, the U.S. federal government made available 530A accounts (also known as Trump accounts). 530A accounts are a type of individual retirement account (IRA) that allow eligible children to receive a one-time contribution of $1,000 from the U.S. federal government, with parents acting as the sole custodian. Unlike normal IRAs, the 530A does not require earned income.

==== Connecticut ====
On June 30, 2021, Connecticut became the first state in the United States to enact a baby bond program. The plan establishes an initial $3,200 for each baby born in Connecticut who's enrolled in the Medicaid program. They'll then have access to the money once becoming adults for a qualified expense, such as college or mortgage down-payment.

=== Proposed plans ===
==== Darity and Hamilton's proposal ====
Darity and Hamilton's initial 2010 proposal was framed as a scaled-up version of the now-defunct United Kingdom's child trust fund program, which provides each newborn a trust ranging from £250 to £500, based on family resources.

Darity and Hamilton proposed that the trust amounts be adjusted on a sliding scale with a starting value of $50,000-60,000 for newborns whose families are in the lowest quartile of net family wealth. Under this proposal, the trust would garner a return of 1.5-2% through federally managed investments and would be accessible only once the child turned 18. Darity and Hamilton projected that if three-quarters of newborns were eligible and the average trust amount was $20,000, the program would cost $60 billion annually.

==== American Opportunity Accounts Act ====
U.S. Senator Cory Booker introduced Senate Bill 3766, which called for the creation of American Opportunity accounts (AO accounts), in the 115th Congress. AO accounts would be provided to each newborn child upon their birth, as well as to children who had not yet turned 18 as of the bill's introduction.

Each American Opportunity account would be seeded with an initial $1,000 from the proposed American Opportunity Fund operated by the U.S. Treasury Department, with a variable amount added each year depending on the child's household income level, as seen in table 1. The funds would be invested in 30-year Treasury bonds, which is projected to accrue around 3 percent interest annually. In the proposal, the account could not be withdrawn from until the holder of the AO account turns 18, and use of the funds in AO account would be restricted to higher education, home ownership, or "other investment... that provides long-term gains to wages and health". Notably, the bill explicitly states that amounts in AO accounts could not be considered when determining eligibility for any federal benefit or service, including financial aid for education.

The estimated annual cost of this program is $60 billion, which would provide AO accounts to the approximately four million newborns in the U.S. annually. Booker has proposed funding the program by raising estate taxes and closing a capital-gains loophole.

In an examination of the American Opportunity Accounts Act, Morningstar determined that "Baby bonds would cut the racial wealth gap in half in terms of resources available per child at age 18".

American Opportunity accounts breakdown by income level
Income (in terms of the federal poverty line)	Supplemental annual payment amount	Estimated account balance for 18-year-old (2019)
less than 100% FPL	$2,000	$46,215
125% FPL	$1,500	$35,081
175% FPL	$1,000	$23,948
225% FPL	$500	$12,815
325% FPL	$250	$7,248
500% FPL	$0	$1,681

==== New Jersey plan ====
In August 2020, Governor Phil Murphy of New Jersey introduced a baby bonds proposal to the amended state budget, which was billed as a "scaled-down version" of Booker's proposal. The plan would provide a one-time transfer of $1,000 to newborn children whose families make 500% or less of the federal poverty level, without the annual additions present in Booker's proposal. These bonds would be worth around $1,270 after 18 years, and the program would cost $80 million annually.

=== Implications and limitations ===
==== Reparations ====
Darity and Hamilton's 2010 article discussed at length the notion of a post-racial America, explaining that race-specific policies, including reparations, were not politically viable at the time. Baby bonds were designed to be race-neutral and remain so in all of the proposals above, and thus are not reparations. Cassidy et al. clarify the distinction and reiterate the need for race-specific policies to address the racial wealth gap, in order to close the shortcomings of a race-neutral program, as noted above. In 2020, Craemer et al., using a wage-based model, calculated the net per capita reparations without interest owed to American descendants of slavery, which amounted to $397,459, and with 6% interest, increases to $132.67 million per descendant of the enslaved. Darity and Kirsten Mullen, in their 2020 book From Here to Equality, cite the calculations of Craemer et al. when proposing reparations policies, including a government trust fund similar in structure to baby bonds, but with seed amounts of $250,000 for all eligible recipients, rather than just newborns.

==== Effect on the racial wealth gap ====
Zewde's 2019 analysis, using data from the 2015 Panel Study of Income Dynamics, projects that baby bonds which are means-tested on the basis of family wealth would reduce the median racial wealth gap from a factor of 16 to a factor of 1.4. Cassidy et al., in a 2019 article co-written with Darity, discuss the results and limitations of Zewde's analysis. Cassidy et al. cite critiques which take issue with Zewde's study design: the analysis used the median family wealth rather than the mean family wealth. Cassidy et al. argue that using the median skews the data by excluding 97% of the wealth held by the top 50% of white families, while Zewde argues that her analysis is representative of the average person. Furthermore, Cassidy et al. find that baby bonds would only increase the wealth held by black families from 9% of total white wealth to 23% of total white wealth. Cassidy et al. conclude that while additional programs (e.g. reparations) are necessary to close the racial wealth gap, baby bonds will have substantial positive impacts on education levels and home ownership for young Americans. According to The Takeaway, various studies show that the most effective way for the US government to reduce the African American wealth gap is to issue baby bonds.

==== Implementation details ====
In 2023, the investment manager Vanguard published a white paper estimating the growth of baby bond accounts and proposing guidelines for the implementation of baby bond programs to promote equitable wealth accumulation, based on data from the Vanguard 529 plan sponsored by the state of Nevada. Their recommendations include:

- Automatically opening accounts for all children at birth
- Giving larger amounts of government funding to lower-income families
- Investing funds in multi-asset portfolios, including stocks as well as bonds, to increase long-term returns and reduce program costs
- Enabling auto-portability to tax-advantaged accounts such as retirement and 529 accounts
- Minimizing administrative overhead through scalability and allowing beneficiaries to self-certify compliance when taking distributions

== See also ==
- Asset-based egalitarianism
- Basic income
- Child trust fund
