= Children's Savings Accounts =

Children's Savings Accounts (CSAs) are a type of savings accounts in the United States, usually specifically designed for higher education savings. They are often available through state or local government programs or nonprofit organizations, in partnership with banks and credit unions. CSAs can be based in state-sponsored 529 plans or other investment products such as Coverdell Education Savings Account, and usually allow deposits from children, parents, and relatives as well as third parties such as school districts and scholarship programs. Many CSAs begin with an initial deposit from government or a nonprofit in the name of the child and subsequent family contributions are often encouraged by matching funds. CSAs often incorporate incentives to encourage saving by disadvantaged youth and families. Withdrawals from CSAs are generally limited to higher education expenses, after the child turns 18. Following college graduation, unspent funds can often be used for other asset purchases (first-time homeownership, small business development, or sometimes cars) or for retirement savings. CSA programs can also include financial education to teach children and families about financial institutions' products, smart consuming and saving practices, and strategies for long-term investing.

== Motivation ==
There are significant disparities in educational attainment by family wealth. As savings projects such as the American Dream Demonstration began to prove that it was possible to encourage low-income individuals and families to save, policymakers began to turn their attention to the potential of asset initiatives to address educational disparities. Family assets build children's expectations about college and, in turn, influence their engagement with school and their parents’ savings behavior and academic support. These effects can help to reduce the achievement gap between wealthy and disadvantaged students by increasing the likelihood that all students take required college-preparatory courses, complete entrance exams such as the ACT or SAT, apply for college and for needed financial aid, and are otherwise on a 'college track'.

Children's Savings Accounts have been demonstrated in research to affect educational outcomes. Researchers theorize that these effects occur through a process known as institutional facilitation, whereby individuals’ attitudes, expectations, and behaviors are shaped through interactions with supportive institutions. In this case, when children experience reinforcement of the expectation of college graduation, their drive towards academic achievement is increased and they begin to act in ways consistent with their ‘college-bound’ identity. In turn, this leads to more savings, which further strengthens expectations and achievement. Conversely, when low-income students learn that their families, schools, neighborhoods, and our financial aid system are less-than-equipped to support their educational outcomes, their self-efficacy (‘I can do’ belief) may be compromised, resulting in disengagement from school performance.

Research suggests that CSAs can interrupt these expectations signaling to disadvantaged children that college is within the realm of their future possibilities. Fostering this identity, in turn, results in improved educational outcomes, on a variety of measures prior to, during, and following college. Asset accumulation—through CSAs or other mechanisms, including parental wealth—is associated with greater academic achievement and preparation for college, higher college enrollment rates, more successful college completion, and more savings in young adulthood. Even small amounts of assets have been shown to be related to increases in college graduation; a child who has designated school savings, such as in a CSA, from $1 to $499 is over four and half times more likely to graduate from college than a child with no savings account. Students who graduate college with a savings history are more likely to continue accumulating assets as they age into young adulthood. Conversely, when students graduate with high levels of student debt, research suggests that they may delay financial milestones, including car purchase and home ownership.

== Policy Features ==
In the early part of the 21st Century, following successes in asset demonstrations in the prior decade, broad consensus emerged that Children's Savings Account policies should be universal, progressive, lifelong, and asset-building. Universal accounts would include every child of a given age. Many envision this as account opening at birth, although others argue that there are reasons to tie accounts to other academic or life milestones. Features that would promote universal inclusion include automatic enrollment, concerted outreach and education strategies, and special incentives for lower-income households. CSAs are also envisioned as accounts capable of keeping individuals connected to financial institutions and facilitating their savings from birth to death. As policies typically include matches and other incentives designed to increase asset accumulation by low-income children and families, CSAs are progressive. Saving is particularly difficult for low-income families and other asset-building policies tend to regressive in their concentration of tax-based incentives to higher earners. Finally, CSAs are understood as vehicles for asset accumulation, not just to build habits of financial savings. When savings are used to purchase other assets—human and financial—their transformative power is much greater.

== National Policy ==
Advocates and policymakers have proposed various national CSA policies. Some of the proposals would provide additional tax incentives for education savings (401Kids accounts in 2011). Others would create national structures for children's savings, without matches or other incentives (American Dream Accounts in 2013). In 2011, the U.S. Department of Education announced an invitational priority for Gaining Early Awareness and Readiness for Undergraduate Programs (GEAR UP) program sites wishing to include CSAs and financial education within their program delivery. This was designed to test the feasibility of incorporating asset accumulation efforts within college-preparatory programs; however, delays and obstacles in implementation may lead policymakers to pursue other options.

National legislation to create a system of CSAs has been proposed in Congress, notably the ASPIRE Act, which would create a lifetime account for every U.S. child at birth, capitalized with $500 investments for those households at or below the median income. In 2013, the College Board recommended that Pell Grants be reimagined as an early commitment program, in order to simulate the effects of a Children's Savings Account within the framework of a means-tested grant. Children and their families could receive notice while children are still in school that they will be eligible for a Pell Grant—to foster college expectations—when they reach college age. Alternatively, savings accounts for children could supplement Pell Grants, with annual deposits of 5 to 10% of the amount of the Pell Grant award for which children would be eligible. Following this announcement, others suggested opening the accounts even earlier, to take advantage of compounding interest, and exploring similar approaches in other financial aid programs, to test the value of manipulating the timing of financial assistance.

== State and Local Policy ==
Some states and localities have their own CSA programs. San Francisco, CA started a Kindergarten-to-College initiative in 2010 which opens CSAs—with a $50 initial deposit—for every kindergartner in the public school system. The program also provides an extra $50 deposit for low-income families and matches family contributions up to $100. Cuyahoga County, Ohio announced a similar program early in 2013, which was later repealed in 2015. Other cities with CSA programs in operation or in pilot include St. Louis, Boston, and New York City.

Among states, Oklahoma has a demonstration project titled SEED OK, which automatically opens accounts for randomly-selected low-income children, in order to test the effects of asset accumulation on educational outcomes. Other states have instituted features of CSA policy into their state-sponsored 529 programs. Maine, through the Alfond Scholarship Fund, opens a CSA for every child born in the state with an initial deposit of $500 and matches for low-income families’ contributions. Nevada started a program in 2013 called "College Kickstart" that opens CSA accounts for public school kindergartners with an initial $50 deposit. In other states, subsidies are targeted toward lower-income savers, in an effort to parallel the subsidies provided through the tax code to wealthier savers.

== International Policy ==
Child development accounts have been established in a number of other countries, where they are primarily viewed as anti-poverty policy, rather than investments in education. Canada, Singapore, and the United Kingdom have instituted national CSA policies, with eligibility criteria, matches, and allowable uses consistent with the national governments’ objectives, including promoting population growth, encouraging educational attainment, and facilitating financial self-sufficiency.

== Student Debt ‘Crisis’ ==
As rising college costs and student loan debt enters the public policy debate, CSAs are now discussed primarily as alternatives to student borrowing. The prospects for widespread adoption of CSA policy shifted in 2012, when, in response to a reporter's question about the feasibility of realizing greater educational outcomes with the meager savings that a low-income student could likely accumulate, researchers at the Assets and Education Initiative at the School of Social Welfare at the University of Kansas analyzed data revealing that the likelihood of college enrollment and even graduation increases even when very small amounts are held in CSAs, largely through the power of expectations and identity effects. This suggests that CSAs could be funded within the footprint of the current public investment in financial aid. While few proponents of CSAs advocate abandoning student loans entirely, it is suggested that complementing borrowing with asset accumulation may improve educational performance. After a certain level, student loans might not produce the desired effect of increased enrollment and graduation rates. Even relatively modest amounts of student debt may have a negative relationship with college completion for most students, perhaps at least in part because of students’ aversion to taking on large amounts of debt to pay for college.

== Critiques and Limitations ==
Children's Savings Accounts have not been without controversy. Some educators and policymakers fear any criticism of student loans could be a ruse for decreasing access to financial aid and, thus, to higher education. Others argue that the amount that most low-income children would be able to accumulate in a CSA is insufficient to truly affect students’ educational trajectory and that more direct support for educational attainment would be a wiser investment. Still others fear that CSAs would represent a new entitlement program. Given contentions and open questions about precisely how to structure Children's Savings Accounts for the greatest return on investment, most practitioners and advocates have argued for a role for CSAs and other asset initiatives as complements to the current financial aid system, components of financial institutions’ offerings to families, and part of financial education initiatives within schools, rather than wholesale replacements of current systems.
