= Asset poverty =

Economic and social condition

Asset poverty is an economic and social condition that is more persistent and prevalent than income poverty. It is a household's inability to access sufficient wealth resources to provide for basic needs for three months. Basic needs refer to the minimum standards for consumption and acceptable needs. Wealth resources consist of home ownership, other real estate (second home, rented properties, etc.), net value of farm and business assets, stocks, checking and savings accounts, and other savings (money in savings bonds, life insurance policy cash values, etc.). Wealth is measured in three forms: net worth, net worth minus home equity, and liquid assets. Net worth consists of all the aspects mentioned above. Net worth minus home equity is the same, except it does not include home ownership in asset calculations. Liquid assets are resources that are readily available, such as cash, checking and savings accounts, stocks, and other sources of savings. There are two types of assets: tangible and intangible. Tangible assets most closely resemble liquid assets in that they include stocks, bonds, property, natural resources, and other hard assets. Intangible assets are simply the access to credit, social capital, cultural capital, political capital, and human capital.

There are trends in the development of asset poverty over time and several factors that cause certain groups to fall into asset poverty more easily than others. Changes in these factors and structures have occurred over the years, but asset poverty remains consistently higher than other forms of poverty, such as income poverty. The reason for this difference is that asset poverty accounts for a household's total wealth, and not just the current income level. It provides a more accurate description of a household's true financial state. Wealth leads to greater economic security, and assets provide a buffer during hardship. One can use assets to pay for further education, better housing, or to maintain a certain standard of living after retirement. Households lacking sufficient assets are forced to live from paycheck to paycheck and face economic hardship when changes in income occur. Those who lack adequate assets are unable to seek a better lifestyle and improve their quality of life because they lack the financial resources to do so.

By any measure, poverty in the United States is increasing. In 2010, the country saw the poverty rate for individuals rise to 15.1 percent, the highest level in nearly two decades. More than 46 million people now live below the federal poverty line of $22,350 for a family of four. However, the official poverty rate, released annually by the Census Bureau, highlights only one aspect of household finances: the percentage of people with insufficient income to cover their day-to-day expenses. It does not count the number of families who have insufficient resources – money in the bank or assets such as a home or a car – to meet emergencies or longer-term needs. When these longer-term needs are factored in, substantially more people in the United States today face a future with limited hope for long-term financial security.

According to the CFED 2013 Assets & Opportunity Scorecard, 44 percent of households – nearly half of Americans – are living in liquid asset poverty. These families do not have the savings or other assets to cover basic expenses (equivalent to what could be purchased with a poverty-level income) for three months if a layoff or other emergency leads to loss of income.

The term asset poverty is also used in the context of low-income/poor countries, where the poverty line may be set at the international standard of $1.25 per day (or sometimes $2 per day). Poor rural families, in particular, do not receive, say, $1 each day; rather, this is a daily average (or corresponds to a yearly average of $365). The asset poor might by chance have income above the poverty line for a time like a month, but their level of assets predict they will be poor in an average month.

== Characteristics of asset poverty ==
Those defined as asset poor share several significant characteristics. Education level, household structure (race, age, gender, and marital status), and homeownership are all unifying factors among the asset-poor. Individuals who obtain a college degree are less likely to become asset-poor than college dropouts, high school graduates, or high school dropouts. To be more specific, high school dropouts were three times as likely as college graduates to experience asset poverty in 1998. In terms of household structure, those who belong to female-headed households or non-elderly households with children are most likely to fall into asset poverty. Couples with no children or married elderly couples are least likely to fall into this position. In general, families with children are the second highest in rates of asset poverty, but they are half as likely to fall into this category if a father is present in the home. The race of the household also affects poverty rates because non-whites are twice as likely as whites to become asset poor. Contrary to what has been reported, from 1989-1998, asset poverty in White Americans actually increased, while asset poverty for African Americans decreased. Home ownership also plays a role in increasing or decreasing the likelihood of falling into asset poverty. Home renters suffer more severe asset poverty because they lack the most prevalent economic asset (a home) and because, on average, they have negative wealth.

== Persistence of asset poverty ==
Asset poverty, when measured by net worth, shows a lower percentage than when measured by net worth minus home equity and liquid assets. This is because homes account for the largest share of household wealth nationwide, and when they are excluded from the wealth equation, total household wealth declines significantly. Also, asset poverty is more likely to persist in several types of situations. First, it is most likely to persist in non-white, single-mother, and elderly households. Second, asset poverty endures in households where the head received little education. Higher education levels correlate with lower probabilities of remaining in asset poverty. Third, ending a marriage increases the likelihood of becoming asset poor, so single-parent households are more likely to become asset poor than two-parent households.

There are also several ways to try to avoid falling into poverty. First, getting married is a way to combine two individuals' assets and avoid poverty. Second, buying a home increases a household's net worth. However, to successfully help low-income and asset-poor families escape impoverished lifestyles, homeownership needs to help build assets, improve housing, and create higher-quality neighborhoods. Thirdly, obtaining an inheritance increases the chances that the poor will escape poverty and decreases the chances that the non-poor will fall into poverty.

== Policies and conclusion ==
The poor need to accumulate assets to reduce national rates of asset poverty. One program policy aimed at helping people experiencing poverty build assets is the Individual Development Accounts (IDAs) program. These accounts require financial education, target people experiencing poverty, and provide funding through matches, not tax breaks. IDAs also allow individuals to deposit funds into insured, interest-bearing savings accounts. Income-focused poverty plans will not remedy asset poverty. Asset poverty will only decrease when people experiencing poverty can acquire and sustain assets to accumulate wealth. Wealth provides economic protection in difficult financial times, and it allows people to invest and prepare for the future. In conclusion, asset poverty appears to be a better measure of poverty in the United States. The probability of an individual or family rising out of poverty would be better illustrated with asset poverty as well. Unlike income poverty, asset poverty incorporates the measure of wealth and transformative assets. The difference between income and wealth, as mentioned above, is that income is a steady source of funds to pay bills and cover day-to-day expenses. Wealth and Transformative assets, however, are long-term sources of funds that can be used in emergencies or to improve one's living conditions or standards of living. of living If two families or individuals have the same income but differing levels of wealth or assets, the family with more assets would have a more definite wealth and be able to maintain their social and/or economic status during turbulent times.

== See also ==
- Accumulation by dispossession
- Bagholder
- Dispossession, oppression and depression
- Division of labor
- Economic abuse
- Economic mobility
- Poverty in the United States
- Poverty threshold
- Self-sufficiency
- Social mobility
- Theories of poverty
