= Greater fool theory =

Theory that the price of an object is determined by consumer demand

In finance, the greater fool theory suggests that one can sometimes make money through speculation on overvalued assets (items with a purchase price drastically exceeding the intrinsic value) if those assets can later be resold at an even higher price.

In this context, one "lesser fool" might pay for an overpriced asset, hoping that they can sell it to an even "greater fool" and make a profit. This only works as long as there are enough new "greater fools" willing to pay higher and higher prices for the asset. Eventually, investors can no longer deny that the price is out of touch with reality, at which point a sell-off can cause the price to drop significantly until it is closer to its fair value, which in some cases could be zero. The last "fools" to purchase in on the product in question are then left holding the bag, allowing earlier, lesser fools to make off with the profit.

== Crowd psychology ==
Due to cognitive bias in human behavior, some people are drawn to assets whose price they see increasing, however irrational it might be. This effect is often further exacerbated by herd mentality, whereby people hear stories of others who bought in early and made big profits, causing those who did not buy to feel a fear of missing out. This effect was explained by economics professor Burton Malkiel in his book A Random Walk Down Wall Street:

A bubble starts when any group of stocks, in this case those associated with the excitement of the Internet, begin to rise. The updraft encourages more people to buy the stocks, which causes more TV and print coverage, which causes even more people to buy, which creates big profits for early Internet stockholders. Successful investors tell you at cocktail parties how easy it is to get rich, which causes the stocks to rise further, which pulls in larger and larger groups of investors. But the whole mechanism is a kind of Ponzi scheme where more and more credulous investors must be found to buy the stock from the earlier investors. Eventually, one runs out of greater fools.

— Burton Malkiel

== Examples ==
In real estate, the greater fool theory can drive investment through the expectation that prices always rise. A period of rising prices may cause lenders to underestimate the risk of default.

In the stock market, the greater fool theory applies when many investors make a questionable investment, with the assumption that they will be able to sell it later to "a greater fool". In other words, they buy something not because they believe that it is worth the price, but rather because they believe that they will be able to sell it to someone else at an even higher price.

Art is another commodity in which speculation and privileged access drive prices, not intrinsic value. In November 2013, hedge fund manager Steven A. Cohen of SAC Capital was selling at auction artworks that he had only recently acquired through private transactions. Works included paintings by Gerhard Richter and Rudolf Stingel and a sculpture by Cy Twombly. They were expected to sell for up to $80 million. In reporting the sale, The New York Times noted that "Ever the trader, Mr. Cohen is also taking advantage of today’s active art market where new collectors will often pay far more for artworks than they are worth."

Cryptocurrencies have been characterized as examples of the greater fool theory. Numerous economists, including several Nobel laureates, have described cryptocurrency as having no intrinsic value whatsoever.

In contrast, in times of hyperinflation or in remote regions, the prices of necessities can be so exorbitant that relative to normal markets these prices may seem arbitrary. Yet the local cost of doing business relative to the price in these regions, as well as the necessity to feed and shelter oneself in a hyper-inflationary crisis, justifies through profit or actual benefit the "foolish" price. In these cases, there is no "bubble", even though prices are very high.

== In popular culture ==
The tenth and final episode of the first season of The Newsroom, written by Aaron Sorkin, is titled "The Greater Fool", which is also the title of the diegetic cover story about Will McAvoy in a fictional edition of New York magazine that features in the episode: at one point, McAvoy is struck repeatedly with a copy.

Later in the episode, economist and fellow anchor Sloan Sabbith, in an attempt to console McAvoy about the unflattering article, explains the concept to him in an ironic light:

"The greater fool is actually an economic term: it's a patsy. ... For the rest of us to profit, we need a greater fool, someone who will buy long and sell short. Most people spend their lives trying not to be the greater fool: we toss him the hot potato, we dive for his seat when the music stops. The greater fool is someone with the perfect blend of self-delusion and ego to think that he can succeed where others have failed. This whole country [the United States] was made by greater fools."

== See also ==
- Arbitrage
- Bagholder
- Beanie Babies
- Economic bubble
- Non-fungible token
- Ponzi scheme
- Speculation
- Subjective theory of value
- Tulip mania
