= Office of Community Services =

U.S. government agency that promotes economic development

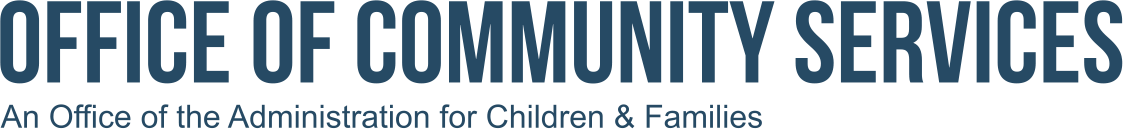
OCS logo as of 2018

The Office of Community Services (OCS) is a division of the US Executive Branch under the Administration for Children and Families within the Department of Health and Human Services. It is the direct successor of the Office of Economic Opportunity, an independent agency created in 1964.

OCS administers six programs which provide funding for community development and poverty alleviation for private and public agencies:

- The Assets for Independence program, which provides matching contributions to Individual Development Accounts for those eligible for the Temporary Assistance for Needy Families program. The program was funded at $18.9 for the 2016 fiscal year. Participants in the program's first year saw a median increase in saving of $657, a drop in experiences of economic hardship by 34%, and a 39% drop in the use of payday loans.
- The Community Economic Development Program, which provides funding for non-profits with the principal goal of supporting low-income housing or community economic development. The program was funded at $19.75 million for the 2017 fiscal year. This program includes separate funding as part of the Healthy Food Financing Initiative, a partnership between the Department of Health and Human Services, the Treasury Department, and the Department of Agriculture to increase access healthy food.
- The Community Services Block Grant, which was created in 1981 in a consolidation of over 200 government programs, and provides funding directly to states to distribute. The program was funded at $715 million in the 2016 fiscal year.
- The Low Income Home Energy Assistance Program, which "provides grants to states to fund fuel payment assistance and home energy efficiency improvements for low-income households." The program was funded at $3.39 billion in the 2016 fiscal year.
- The Rural Community Development Program which provides funding for water management and wastewater treatment. The program was funded at $7.45 million in the 2016 fiscal year.
- The Social Services Block Grant, used to support a wide range of activities. As of 2010, the most highly supported of which were child care, foster care, and services for the disabled. The grant is authorized by Title XX of the Social Security Act, and funding is allocated according to population. The program was funded at $1.6 billion for the 2016 fiscal year.

== See also ==
- Poverty in the United States
- Poverty reduction
