= Bagholder =

Slang for shareholder left holding worthless stocks

In financial slang, a bagholder is a shareholder left holding shares of worthless stocks. The bagholder typically bought in near the peak, when people were hyping the asset and the price was high, and held it all the way through steep declines, losing a large amount of money in the process.

It can also refer to the holder of other assets and financial instruments that become worthless, such as the junior bonds of a defaulted company or the coins of a failed cryptocurrency. The word is derived by combining "shareholder" with the expression "left holding the bag."

== Examples ==
The shareholders could be caught up in a corporate bankruptcy and accounting scandal, as was the case with Enron and Worldcom, or be the victims of a pump and dump scheme, in which investors fall victim to e-mail spam, rigged stock tip forums, or other tricks used by stock touts to drive up the shares of worthless penny stocks.

If a worthless property is bought with the intent to sell it at a higher price, the gullible person who ends up owning it is said to be the bagholder.

== Etymology ==
The expression "left holding the bag" originated in eighteenth-century Britain and spread throughout the English-speaking world. In this context, a person left holding the bag is stuck with the stolen goods, taking the blame from the police while the rest of a criminal gang escapes.

The phrase is also used in association with the fool's errand known as a snipe hunt, a practical joke in which an unsuspecting newcomer is led outdoors and left "holding the bag" in which to catch a creature that does not exist. As an American rite of passage or haze, it is often associated with summer camps and groups such as the Boy Scouts.

== See also ==
- Asset poverty
- Dispossession, oppression, and depression
- Fall guy
- Greater fool theory
- Hot potato (game)
- Identity performance
- Kitchen sink realism
- Precariat
- Pyramid scheme
- Winner and loser culture
