= Apple bobbing =

Party game where people grab apples with their teeth

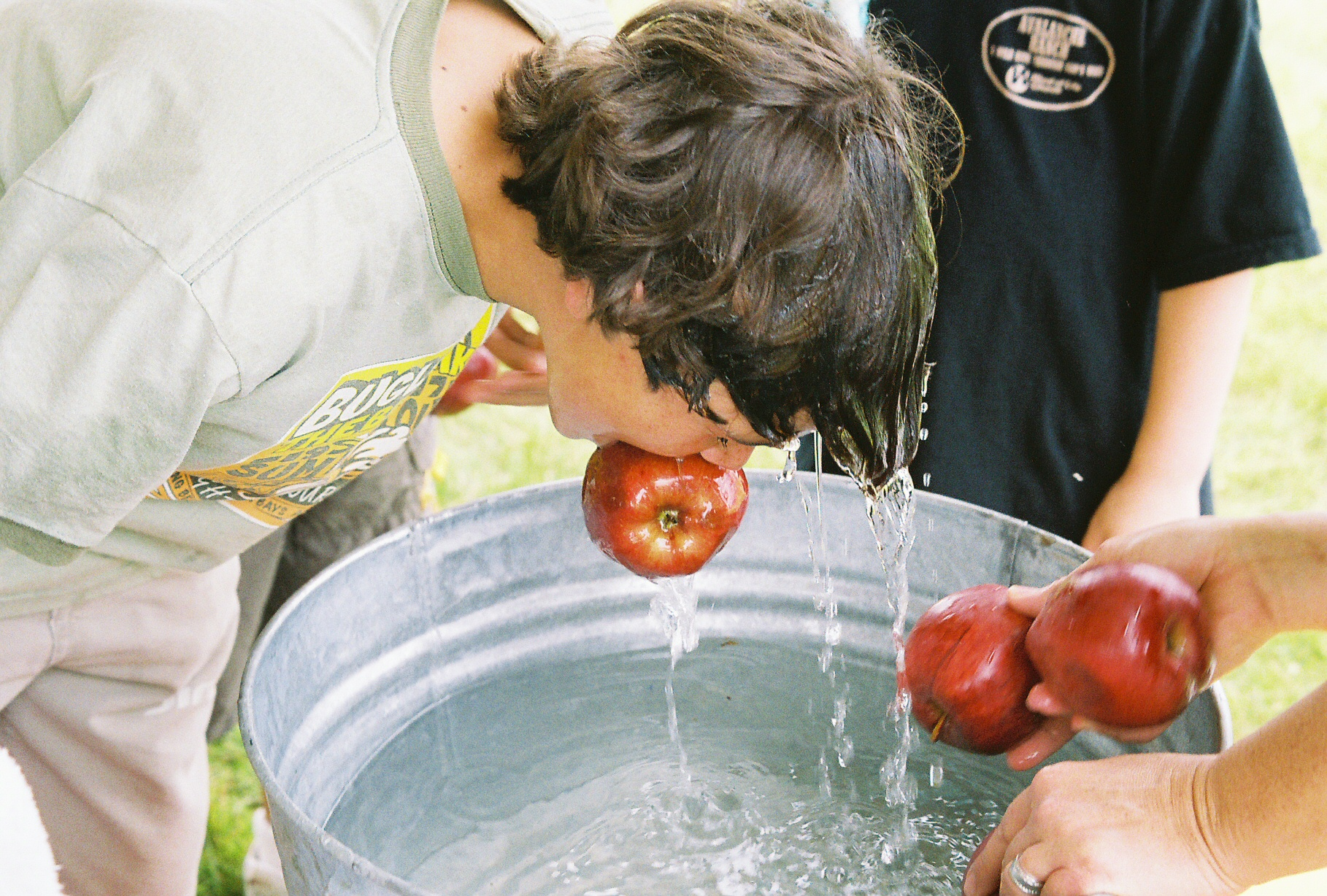
Apple bobbing

Apple bobbing, also known as bobbing for apples, is a game often played on Halloween and Bonfire Night. The game is played by filling a tub or a large basin with water and putting apples in the water. Because apples are less dense than water, they will float at the surface. Players (usually children) then try to catch one with their teeth. Use of arms is not allowed, and the hands are often tied behind the back to prevent cheating.

In Scotland, this may be called dooking (i.e., ducking). In northern England, the game is often called apple ducking or duck-apple. In Ireland and Newfoundland and Labrador, "Snap Apple Night" is a synonym for Halloween. Another variation involves using the mouth to drop a fork from above to 'catch' the apple.

While bobbing for apples is the most common, other times the apples are substituted for nuts (most commonly hazel or chestnut).

== Apple on a String ==
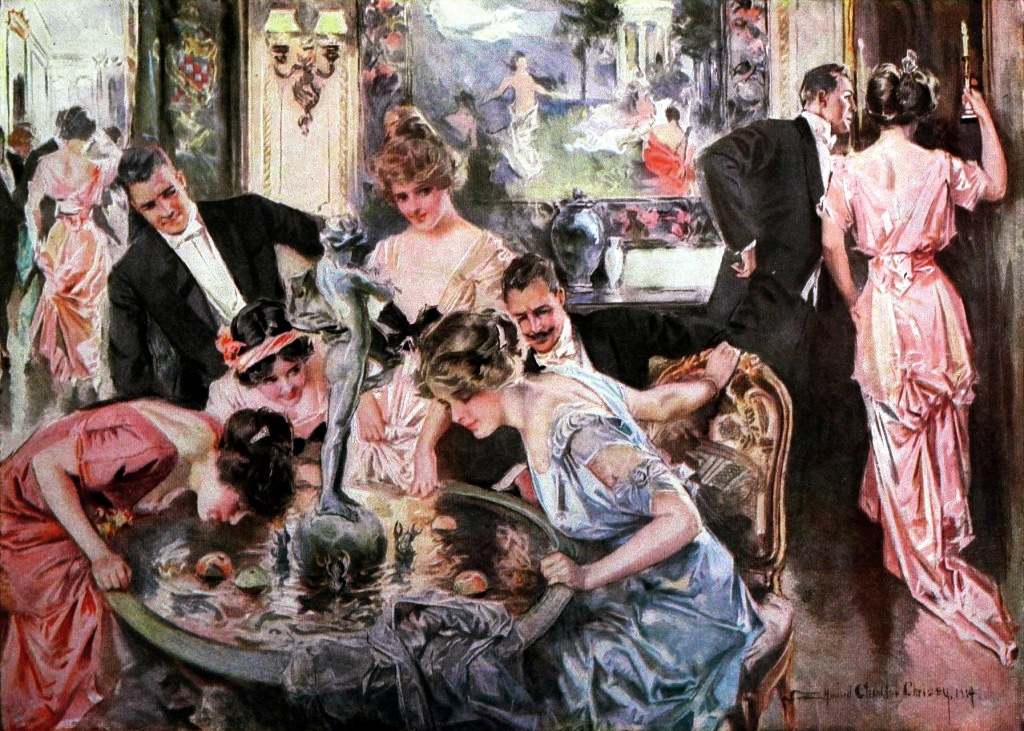
Halloween, 1915, Howard Chandler Christy

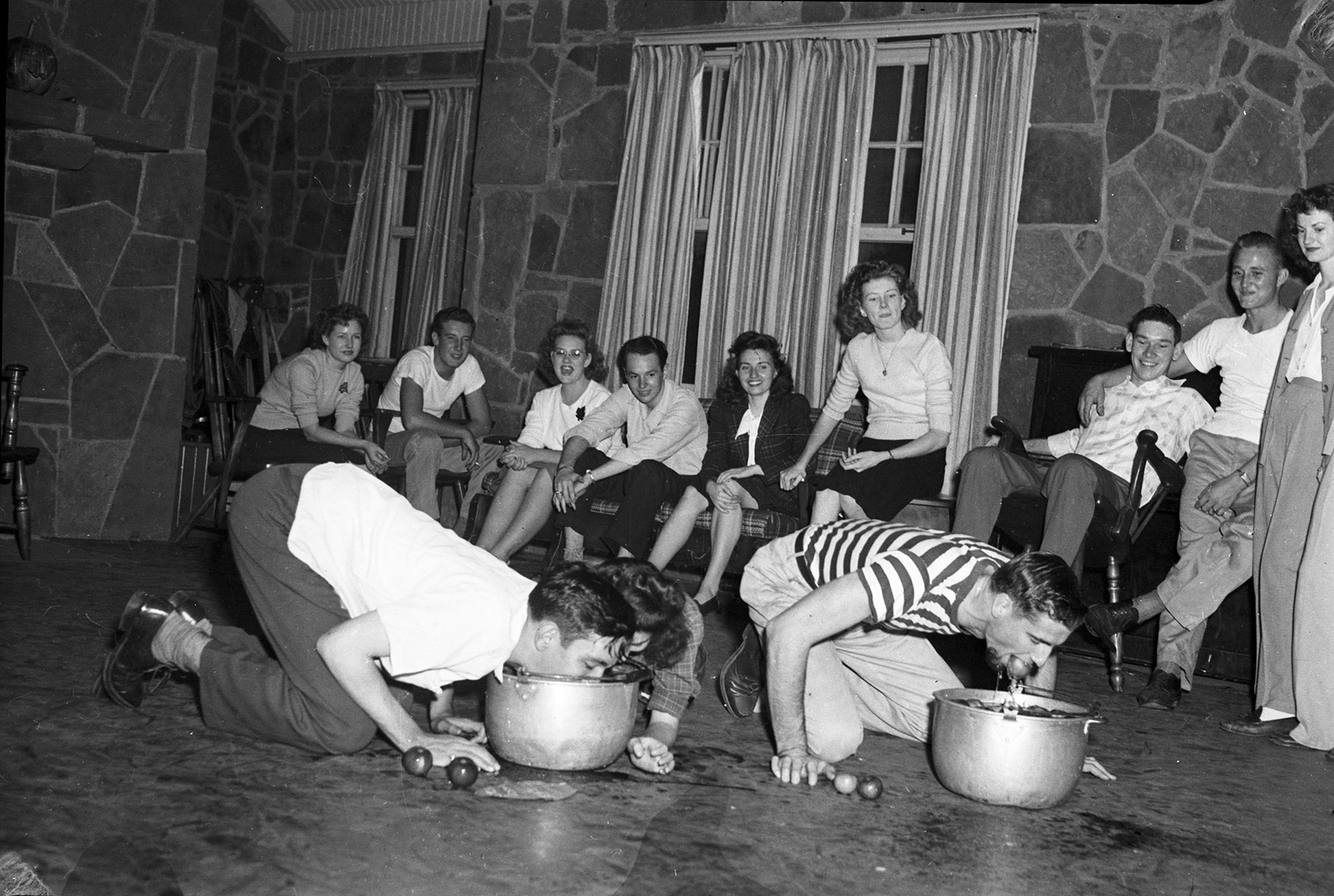
North Texas Agricultural College students bobbing for apples, circa 1930s

A common variant of bobbing of apples is the game snap apple or apple on a string, in which apples are hung from the ceiling and contestants jump to take bites - the winner is the contestant that manages to eat their entire apple first. To increase the difficulty, it is common to spin the apples beforehand or shake the cords, often catching contestants who are unaware or too slow in the face.

In Scotland, alongside dooking for apples, treacle scones, smeared in additional treacle, are strung from the ceiling at Halloween.

== History ==
During an annual celebration, young unmarried people tried to bite into an apple floating in water or hanging from a string on a line; the first person to bite into the apple would be the next one to be allowed to marry.

Both apple bobbing and an apple on a string in 18th-century Ireland are mentioned by Charles Vallancey in his book Collectanea de Rebus Hibernicis.

A maiden who placed the apple she bobbed under her pillow was said to dream of her future sweetheart.

== In popular culture ==
Agatha Christie's mystery novel Hallowe'en Party, is about a girl who is drowned in an apple-bobbing tub.

In the SpongeBob SquarePants season 1 episode "Scaredy Pants", Mr. Krabs manages to catch an apple while he was apple bobbing, but accidentally swallows it and briefly chokes on it.

== See also ==
- Snap-dragon (game)
