= Snap-dragon (game) =

Game involving grabbing fruit out of burning brandy

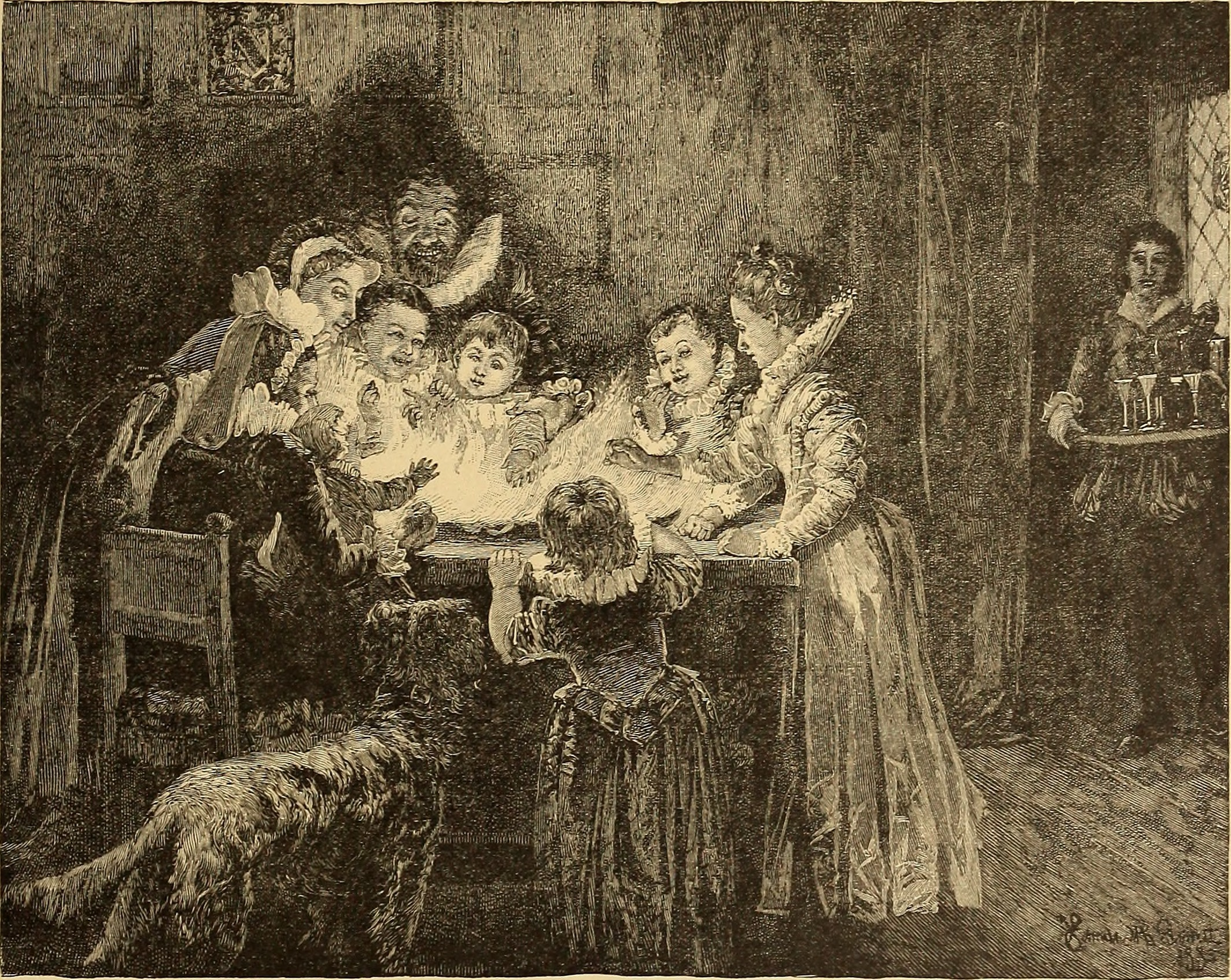
Children playing snap-dragon (1889)

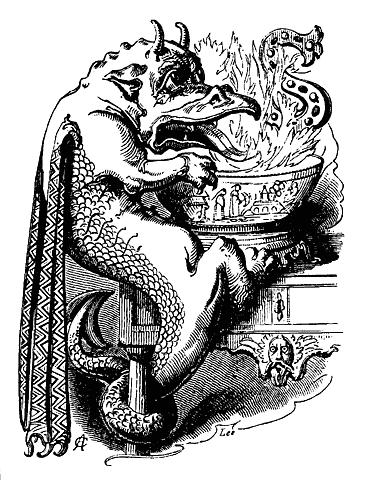
Fanciful image of a dragon playing Snap-dragon, from Robert Chambers' Book of Days (1879)

Snap-dragon (also known as Flap-dragon, Snapdragon, or Flapdragon) was a parlour game popular from about the 16th century. It was played during the winter, particularly on Christmas Eve. Brandy was heated and placed in a wide shallow bowl; raisins were placed in the brandy, which was then set alight. Typically, lights were extinguished or dimmed to increase the eerie effect of the blue flames playing across the liquor. The game is described in Samuel Johnson's Dictionary of the English Language (1755) as "a play in which they catch raisins out of burning brandy and, extinguishing them by closing the mouth, eat them". According to an article in Richard Steele's Tatler magazine, "the wantonness of the thing was to see each other look like a demon, as we burnt ourselves, and snatched out the fruit". Snap-dragon was played in England, Canada, and the United States, but there is insufficient evidence of the practice in Scotland or other countries.

== Meanings ==
The words snap-dragon and flap-dragon can refer to the game, the raisins used in the game, or the bowl with brandy and raisins. Other senses of flap-dragon are that of something worthless or trivial, as in "A Flap-dragon for your service, Sir!" from William Congreve's The Way of the World, and "a contemptuous term for a Dutchman or German". In The Winter's Tale, Shakespeare used the word to describe a moment when a ship at sea is instantly swallowed up by a storm.

== Ingredients ==
The liquid used in snap-dragon was typically brandy, although similar flammable liquors could also be used. Traditionally, raisins were the treat to be snatched. (William Sandys specifies Málaga raisins.) Other treats could also be used. Of these, almonds were the most common alternative or addition, but currants, candied fruit, figs, grapes, and plums also featured. Salt could be sprinkled in the bowl. The low bowl was typically placed in the middle of a table to prevent damage from inevitable splashes of burning brandy. In one variation, a Christmas pudding is placed in the centre of the bowl with raisins around it.

== Traditions ==
Most sources describe snap-dragon as a Christmas tradition, but Blain suggests that in the United States it was played at Halloween.

There were several other traditions surrounding the game of snap-dragon. Mary F. Blain describes the belief that the person who snatches the most treats out of the brandy will meet their true love within a year. In another tradition, one of the raisins contains a gold button and becomes "the lucky raisin". The person who fishes the raisin out can claim a reward or boon (favour) of their choosing. In the short story Master Sandy's Snapdragon by Elbridge S. Brooks, snap-dragon is played in the royal household of James I of England. Young Prince Charles (later Charles I of England) catches the lucky raisin and, as his favour, requests the freedom of Walter Raleigh.

According to Robert Chambers' Book of Days (1879), the game was accompanied by a chant:

Here he comes with flaming bowl,
Don't he mean to take his toll,
Snip! Snap! Dragon!

Take care you don't take too much,
Be not greedy in your clutch,
Snip! Snap! Dragon!

With his blue and lapping tongue
Many of you will be stung,
Snip! Snap! Dragon!

For he snaps at all that comes
Snatching at his feast of plums,
Snip! Snap! Dragon!

But Old Christmas makes him come,
Though he looks so fee! fa! fum!
Snip! Snap! Dragon!

Don't 'ee fear him but be bold –
Out he goes his flames are cold,
Snip! Snap! Dragon!

== Literary references ==
The first printed references to snap-dragons or flap-dragons are in Shakespeare's Love's Labour's Lost (1594):

O, they have lived long on the alms-basket of words.
I marvel thy master hath not eaten thee for a word
for thou art not so long by the head as honorificabilitudinitatibus:
thou art easier swallowed than a flap-dragon.

and in Henry IV, Part 2 (1598):

Because their legs are both of a bigness, and a'
plays at quoits well, and eats conger and fennel,
and drinks off candles' ends for flap-dragons

John Dryden refers to them in his play The Duke of Guise (1683):

I'll swear him guilty.
I swallow oaths as easy as snap-dragon,
Mock-fire that never burns.

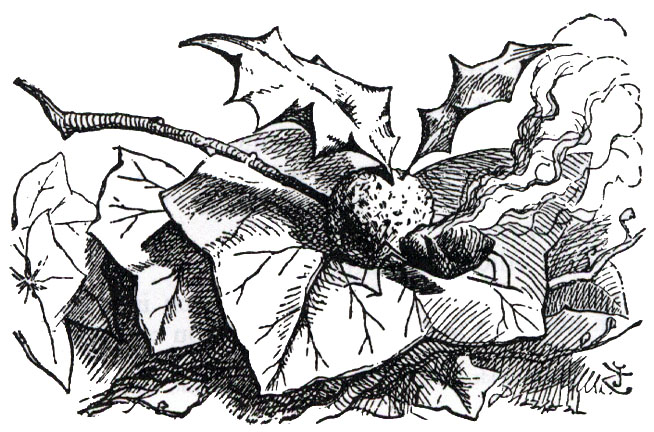
John Tenniel's illustration of a "snap-dragon-fly" from Through the Looking-Glass (1871)

Snap-dragons were also described in Isaac D'Israeli's The Curiosities of Literature (1791–1823). However, at this time it was not a parlour game but a drinking game, with the snap-dragons being "small combustible bodies fired at one end and floated in a glass of liquor, which an experienced toper swallowed unharmed, while yet blazing". Sandys cites a related variant of Snap-dragon where a lit candle end is placed in a cup of ale or cider; the aim is to quaff the liquor without singeing one's face.

The first reference to snap-dragon explicitly as a parlour game is in Francis Grose's Dictionary of the Vulgar Tongue (1811): "Christmas gambol: raisins and almonds being put into a bowl of brandy, and the candles extinguished, the spirit is set on fire, and the company scramble for the raisins."

By the mid-19th century snap-dragon was firmly entrenched as a Christmas parlour game. In this sense it is referenced in 1836 in Charles Dickens' The Pickwick Papers and in 1861 in Anthony Trollope's novel Orley Farm. Lewis Carroll, in Through the Looking-Glass, and What Alice Found There (1871) describes "A snap-dragon-fly. Its body is made of plum pudding, its wings of holly-leaves, and its head is a raisin burning in brandy."

Snap-dragon is mentioned in T. H. White's The Sword in the Stone (1938); although ostensibly set in the Middle Ages, the novel is full of such anachronisms.

Agatha Christie's book Hallowe'en Party describes a children's party (in which a child's murder causes Poirot to be brought in) where snap-dragon is played at the end of the evening.

In The Dark Flight Down by Marcus Sedgwick, chapter five describes a game of snapdragon played during the wake of Director Korp. The rules are described as a drinking game, whereby should a player drop a raisin, he or she has to take a shot. Boy recalls Valerian playing (and winning) the game with absinthe as the alcohol which burns, including how he used to show off as the game wore on.

In Jamaica Inn (novel) by Daphne du Maurier, chapter twelve, Joss Merlyn pretends he spent Christmas Eve playing games of snapdragon and cat's cradle.

== Origins ==
In the English play Lingua (1607), the practice is said to come from classical antiquity: "When Hercules had killed the flaming dragon of Hesperia with the apples of that orchard, he made this fiery meat; in memory whereof he named it Snapdragon." Brooks' Master Sandy's Snapdragon suggests another mythical origin, relating the fire of snap-dragons to Saint George and the dragon. Chambers suggests that it hearkens back to druidic fire-worship. According to the Oxford English Dictionary entry for flapdragon, "the original sense may have been identical with a dialectal sense of snapdragon, viz. a figure of a dragon's head with snapping jaws, carried about by the mummers at Christmas; but of this there is no trace in our quot[ation]s".

== Science ==
Michael Faraday, in his essay The Chemical History of a Candle (1860), suggests that the raisins in snap-dragon act like miniature wicks. The concept is similar to that of burning brandy on top of Christmas puddings—the brandy is burning but is not hot enough to consume the raisins. Nevertheless, children often burned their hands or mouths playing this game, which may have led to the practice mostly dying out in the early 20th century, although some families still played the game.

== See also ==
- Apple bobbing – Party game where people grab apples with their teeth
- Hot potato – Party game
