= Fall guy =

Person who is wrongly blamed for a bad outcome

Fall guy is a colloquial phrase that refers to a person to whom blame is deliberately and falsely attributed in order to deflect blame from another party.

== Origin ==
The origin of the term "fall guy" is unknown and contentious. Many sources place it in the early 20th century, while some claim an earlier origin. In April 2007, William Safire promoted a search to unearth its origins.

The term "fall guy" for one whom blame was directed upon in order to shield others had appeared in mass public culture in the U.S. at least by the 1920s. In 1925 it was the title of a Broadway play, The Fall Guy, by James Gleason and George Abbott, starring future Hollywood character actors Ernest Truex and Dorothy Patterson. This was turned into a crime film by Hollywood in 1930, The Fall Guy, with the "fall guy" again used by a gangster as an unwitting narcotics courier. It saw widespread use in the crime-dominated film noir era of the mid-to-late 1940s into the early 1950s.

A related use of "fall guy" was for one to be left "holding the bag", meaning to be abandoned to be caught and implicated in a crime, particularly holding stolen goods, either by design or circumstance. This in turn led to the term bagholder, the victim of a fraudulent investment scheme. A related term was "patsy", which typically (but not exclusively) referred to someone set up before the fact to take a fall, as opposed to simply being left "holding the bag" when something went wrong in carrying out a crime.

=== Errant Teapot Dome conflation ===
One suggestion that has been made in popular culture but discounted by Safire is that the word's origin dates to the administration of U.S. President Warren G. Harding (1921–1923), when Albert B. Fall, a U.S. Senator from New Mexico who served as Secretary of the Interior during Harding's years in office, became notorious for his involvement in the infamous Teapot Dome Scandal.

=== In the American political arena ===
A 1940s use of "fall guy" implying one inheriting work or responsibility - by default - appeared in the 1940s. A paper on "Isolationism is not dead" quotes an anonymous editorial from a paper in the Pacific Northwest on the topic of the Bretton Woods financial accord and the Food Conferences in which the United States was depicted as the "fall guy, the one to carry the load".

By the 1950s, the use of the term had morphed in the context of unions and industrial society to refer to the low man on the totem pole as one to whom the unpleasant tasks in a job or situation would be assigned.

By the 1950s and 1960s, "fall guy" could be used in lieu of "whipping boy", someone to be ritually pilloried in the absence of (or avoiding punishing) a more specifically responsible party. In a 1960 paper called the "Politics of Pollution", Robert Bullard wrote public officials seeking to deflect criticism over landfills found a "fall guy" in the form of the faceless figures in "the federal government, state governments and private disposal companies".

== Examples ==
A classified secret message by the U.S. government on Joachim Joesten for calling Lee Harvey Oswald a "fall guy" for the assassination of John F. Kennedy

Some specific examples of the use of "fall guy" include:

- Assassin of John F. Kennedy, Lee Harvey Oswald, was characterized as a "fall guy" in the traditional criminal sense (regardless of the fact that the assassination was a political event overlaying the criminal act of murder (Note: The killing was a murder under Texas law, but it was not a federal crime to assassinate a President at that time.)) by writer Joachim Joesten in the title of his 1964 book Oswald, Assassin or Fall Guy?.

In reviewing the Joesten book for the New Times American journalist Victor Perlo reinforced the theme that Oswald "was 'a fall guy,' to use the parlance of the kind of men who must have planned the details of the assassination".

- Former United States Attorney General John Mitchell claimed he was being set up as a "fall guy" in the traditional sense of one "hung out to dry" or left "holding the bag" in the Watergate scandal. In Public Doublespeak: On Mistakes and Misjudgments Terence Moran uses the term in reference to a transcript of both Richard Nixon and John Dean. He also cites a scene from The Maltese Falcon in which Wilmer, the young gunman, is sold out and left to "take the fall".
- The phrase was used regarding the Iran–Contra scandal by Representative Louis Stokes during a 1987 session of Congress, maintaining Oliver North chose to play a "fall guy" by remaining steadfast and loyal during the hearings to those he had worked for to protect them.

== See also ==
- Throw under the bus
- Collateral damage
- Bagholder – Slang for shareholder left holding worthless stocks
- Sacrificial lamb – Person sacrificed for the common good
- Scapegoating – Practice of singling out any party for unmerited negative treatment or blame
- Setting up to fail – Form of workplace bullying and no-win situation
- Straw man – Form of incorrect argument and informal fallacy
- Whipping boy – Historical profession
