= American Dream Demonstration =

In banking, the American Dream Demonstration (ADD) was a program proxy developed to test the potential impact of Individual Development Accounts (IDA) and ran from 1997-2002. During its tenure, the ADD program demonstrated through 2,377 accounts, that IDAs can be delivered effectively by a wide range of community organizations and financial institutions. The ADD initiative was evaluated by eight different research methods including implementation assessment, participant case studies, cross sectional-survey, monitoring, in-depth interviews, cost analysis, experimental impact evaluation and assessment of community effects.

== Individual families ==
During the six-year ADD demonstration, 2,364 low-income individuals became accountholders. It was evaluated that those with the lowest incomes in ADD’s saved more than those who earned more, with 46% were below the poverty line and 21% at less than half of the poverty line. Incomes averaged $9,843 for a single person and $16,687 for a family of three—116% of the federal poverty level. The median annual household income was $16,296.

Of those 2,346 individuals who wished to withdrawal after an average of 2 years of savings in 2002, 28% of accountholders bought homes, 23% started their own business, 23% paid for post-secondary education, 18% repaired their homes, and 7% saved for retirement.

== Private partners ==
ADD developed a parallel account structure which keeps matching funds in an account accessible only to the program staff for private financial institutions which eliminated fraud and misuse of funds.

Over 80% of accountholders approved of the withdrawal restrictions and grew their IDA’s five times as large in savings than they would have in any other liquid bank account and savings they had before opening their IDA. Together, accountholders saved a total of $1,248,678—an average net savings of $19.07 a month over a span of two years. Average and total gross savings were much higher—$40 per month for a total of $2,530,538.

By the end of 2001, accountholders had saved an average of $528, and the matching funds brought this up to $1,543. With the matching funds, ADD generated total savings of $3,648,149.

== Impact of ADD ==
ADD’s delivery of significant data propelled federal and state governments to implement additional IDA policies. As a result, more than 20,000 IDAs have opened in more than 500 community partnerships throughout the country. Currently, a federal legislation is in the works that would reach nearly hundreds of thousands and potentially millions of accountholders.

== See also ==
- Asset-based egalitarianism
- Child Trust Fund
- Saving for Education, Entrepreneurship, and Downpayment
- Individual Development Accounts
