= Hot potato =

Party game

Hot potato is a party game that involves players gathering in a circle and tossing a small object such as a beanbag or even a soft ball to each other while music plays. The player who is holding the object when the music stops is eliminated.

== Origins ==
The origins of the hot potato game are not clear. However, it may go back as far as 1888 when Sidney Oldall Addy's Glossary of Sheffield Words describes a game in which a number of people sit in a row, or in chairs round a parlor. In this game, a lit candle is handed to the first person, who says:

Jack's alive, and likely to live
If he dies in your hand, you've a forfeit to give

The one in whose hand the light expires has to pay the forfeit.

== See also ==
- Bagholder – Slang for shareholder left holding worthless stocks
- Musical chairs – Elimination genre party game
- Pass the parcel – British party game
- Passing the buck – English-language idiom meaning "to shift blame onto another"
- Snap-dragon (game) – Game involving grabbing fruit out of burning brandy
