= The Children's Mutual =

- Company type: Fraternal benefit society
- Industry: Family savings and insurance
- Founded: 1881; 145 years ago
- Headquarters: Bromley, United Kingdom
- Key people: Euan Allison, Chief Executive Officer

The Children's Mutual is a United Kingdom-based financial savings and insurance provider aimed at children. It is the trading name of the Forester Fund Management Limited, part of Forester Life Ltd, which is owned by the Foresters Financial a mutual organisation.

Previously, The Children's Mutual was a trading name of the Tunbridge Wells Equitable Friendly Society Limited, a mutual organisation, until the Society's business was transferred to Forester Life Ltd in April 2013.

== History ==
The organisation behind The Children's Mutual brand has a long history. Established in 1881, what later became the Tunbridge Wells Equitable Friendly Society (TWEFS), was formed to provide a scheme for working people to help protect them against loss of income during illness and build up a lump sum for their old age.

When the National Insurance Bill was launched in 1911, The company were one of the friendly societies chosen to help the Government administer the new state scheme.

Over time, The Company expanded into other areas of financial services, especially long-term savings for children, which increasingly became their specialism. In 2003 TWEFS re-launched as The Children's Mutual to recognise this specialist positioning and to prepare for the launch of the Government's new Child Trust Fund (CTF) scheme.

In April 2013, The Children's Mutual and The Tunbridge Wells Equitable Friendly Society transferred their engagements to Forester Life, following a member vote at the Special General Meeting in February.

== Operations ==
The company's provides a range of products focused on providing share-based stakeholder and non-stakeholder Child Trust Fund (CTF) accounts. In addition the Company offer a Shariah stakeholder Child Trust Fund which recognises that a significant number of Muslim parents want to be able to access the advantages of the scheme in a way that complies with their faith. The Children's Mutual also provides the Growing Up Bond, a share-based investment plan. In 2008, the company was the recipient of Best Child Trust Fund provider for 2006, 2007 and 2008 from Investment Life & Pensions Moneyfacts Awards. In the 2006 Financial Adviser Service Awards, The Children's Mutual won a 4 Star Award in the Life and Pension Provider Category.

The company acted as partner for a range of well known financial services and child-orientated brands in providing Child Trust Funds, such as Boots, Asda, Mothercare and Lloyds Bank. The total number of members and other customers that The Company serves more than doubled from 330,000 to well over 700,000 between 2006 and 2007, with funds under management increased from around £600 million to nearly £1 billion.

In 2007 it was estimated that one in five new CTF accounts actively opened by parents was placed with The Children's Mutual.
