= Representation (journal) =

- Discipline: Political science
- Language: English
- Edited by: Simona Guerra and Javier Sajuria

Publication details
- History: 1960-present
- Publisher: Routledge on behalf of the McDougall Trust
- Frequency: Quarterly

Standard abbreviations
- ISO 4: Representation

Indexing
- ISSN: 0034-4893 (print); 1749-4001 (web)
- LCCN: 2003200733
- OCLC no.: 610465376

Links
- Journal homepage; Online access; Online archive

Representation is a quarterly peer-reviewed academic journal covering representative democracy. The editors-in-chief are Simona Guerra (University of Surrey) and Javier Sajuria (Queen Mary University of London). The journal was established in 1960 and is published by Routledge on behalf of the McDougall Trust. The Representation and Electoral Systems specialist section of the American Political Science Association has adopted this journal and provides it for free to its membership.

== Abstracting and indexing ==
According to the publisher, the journal is abstracted and indexed in major databases such as Scopus and the Web of Science. As of 2023, Representation has an impact factor of 1.70. The SCImago Journal Rank (SJR) assigns it an SJR indicator of 0.633 and an h-index of 29.

== Scope ==
The journal publishes research on electoral systems, political representation, democratic theory, and other issues related to representative democracy.
