= Assets for Independence =

Federal program

Assets for Independence (AFI) is a federal program that distributes discretionary grants to help the impoverished achieve one of three goals: (1) homeownership; (2) business ownership; and (3) post-secondary education. AFI was created by the Assets for Independence Act.

In order to strengthen communities and individuals, AFI uses several tools including financial education and grants supporting Individual Development Accounts (IDAs), also known as matched savings accounts.

== Purpose and history ==
First introduced in 1991, the Assets for Independence Act (AFIA) worked its way through several sessions of Congress, finally passing in 1998. The 105th Congress appropriated $105 million to fund IDAs over the course of 5 years. AFI is the "largest federal funder of IDA programs" awarding grants to more than 400 non-profits and government programs. More than 84,000 families received some sort of assistance from AFI through the IDA and financial education programs. Over 40% of these families have been able to "join the economic mainstream" through the purchase of assets.

The AFI's ultimate goal is to help people get themselves out of poverty by creating a habit of saving their income and use those savings to purchase an asset. With this money, organizations fund individual development accounts (IDAs) that may help eligible participants obtain the desired assets in the future. Money from these savings accounts can only be used for the three specific assets mentioned earlier, i.e. homeownership, business ownership, and post-secondary education. Besides awarding grants for IDAs, the program also manages a national resource center with the intent of helping AFI grantees better understand IDAs and other asset-building strategies.

AFI is currently administered through the Office of Community Services (OCS) and part of the U.S. Department of Health and Human Services (HSS). As stated in its mission, AFI works to help low-income families transition into economic self-sufficiency. In a special partnership between OCS and the Administration for Native Americans (ANA), AFI helps support the building of assets in native communities through the Native Asset Building Initiative (NABI).

Unfortunately, no funds were appropriated for AFI in 2017, so the last fiscal year it was able to disperse funds was 2016. It is currently inactive.

== Stakeholders ==
In order to meet their goals and purposes, AFI collaborates with a large variety of organizations that range from government departments to local charities. Several groups are described below. Before noting specific groups AFI works with, it is important to take into account that each organization has specific goals, but they relate to AFI's overall goals and purposes. Although these are not all the organizations and programs that collaborate with AFI, a large variety of programs is apparent.

The groups we will mention in the following section are the Office of Refugee Resettlement, the IRS, the U.S. Department of Housing and Urban Development, and non-profit groups.

The Office of Refugee Resettlement, like AFI, is part of the Department of Health and Human Services. Refugee Resettlement focuses on policies, programs, and initiatives to aid refugees within the country. Consequently, AFI uses the Office of Refugee Resettlement as a resource for grantees.

The IRS acts as another resource for AFI. One of AFI's main goals is to help individuals and groups to effectively save, and one way AFI is able to accomplish this goal is with the help of an IRS program called the Earned Income Tax Credit (EITC) program. AFI uses this program, in collaboration with the IRS, to train organizations that receive grants.

The U.S. Department of Housing and Urban Development, like many of the AFI grantees, works on development projects. Consequently, the Department of Housing also acts as a useful resource and aid for AFI and their grantees. The specific projects that both AFI and the Department of Housing have in common deal with development in poorer areas in the country, and both AFI and the Department of Housing reach out to a common group of people, and in several situations they have had to collaborate on the same projects.

Non-profits and Grantees are the bulk of AFI's organizational relations. Although grantees may not seem like partners, many of the organizations receiving funds from AFI have been recipients for years. Because AFI provides grants to a large number of organizations in nearly all 50 states, it is not necessary to list all of them. However, the organizations mostly lie within the following groups: state universities, development councils, community shelters, child-support services, Native American Nations, Community Action, the United Way and local non-profits.

== Organizational structure ==
With a basic understanding of AFI and its purpose, goals and partners, we can better understand the organization's inner structure and potential problems. In this next section of the brief, we will discuss the organizational structure—the grant process and the internal makeup—as well as the budget, and finally different problems AFI has.

In this section of our brief, we will discuss the organizational structure. There are two parts to the organizational structure. These two parts are the internal organization, and the grant process.

=== Internal organization ===
AFI is a federal program headed by the Office of Community Services, within the U.S. Department of Health and Human Services' Administration for Children and Families. The Program Manager of AFI works in collaboration with Grant Management offices that are located near project locations. When a certain grant is given to an individual group, the grant management offices work as the middleman between AFI headquarters and the group in question.

AFI is a program within the structure of the Department of Health and Human Services (HHS). Each year, Congress earmarks funds for AFI within the budget of HHS. Although AFI receives funds through the HHS, AFI s essentially run by the Office of Grant Management (OGM) and the Office of Community Services (OCS). These two offices work together to distribute the funds to grantees around the United States.

OCS approves grantees to receive funding contingent upon their ability to match funds. Grantees partner with a Qualified Financial Institution (QFI)—a bank or a credit union—and they subsequently, with their bank or credit union, find qualified individuals to set up Individual Development Accounts (IDA) Once money is approved and an individual deposits money in an IDA, the HHS Division of Payment Management (DPM) disburses the money.

As the OCS approves and funds grantees, the OGM is responsible for holding grantees accountable to AFI's goal and general oversight. This office also evaluates the effectiveness of the grants, as well as other offices.

=== Grantees ===
After understanding AFI's internal organization and its grant process, we can now describe the organizations and groups that receive AFI grants. The groups that are included within the 501c3 status include the following: not-for-profit organizations; state or local governments; tribal governments; low-income credit unions; community development financial institutions; and any organizations that can demonstrate a relationship with a community-based organization addressing poverty.

A major organizational issue for the AFI deals with the grants it offers. Table 3.1 illustrated below is a description of what the grant offers, who can apply, how many times an organization can apply and how grant monies are released.

- Who can apply? Grant applicants must have a 501c3 status.
- How many times can organizations apply? There is no limit on how many times an organization may apply for grants.
- How is grant money released? Funds are only released as matching funds are produced (information below).

The following is an example of the grant-giving process to a nonprofit. An organization that receives a $20,000 grant from AFI, but only has $5,000 of matching funds initially will receive $5,000 from the AFI grant and the rest of the $20,000 as more funds are raised. Additionally, organizations must use the entirety of the grant before a set deadline, otherwise the funds are returned to AFI.

To qualify, the above organizations must be able to contribute funds at least equal to the grant given by the federal government. The grantees find and distribute the funds to qualifying individuals. The grant from the federal government will not contribute more than $2,000 to any individual. Each dollar invested by the individual is matched with $1 to $8 (the average is between $2 and $3).

== Budget ==
=== What AFI receives ===
AFI receives its funds through the Office of Grant Management. After Congress passes the budget, HHS administers the budget through the Administration for Children and Family's Office of Community Services. With the funds funneling down from HHS, AFI has received an average of $20,123,400.

Since 2008, AFI funding has fallen approximately 5 percent, and has been at a slow incline since then. In response, AFI has not only spent less, but has spent a larger percentage of the funding designated to the program.

=== What AFI gives ===
On average, AFI spends $22,144,890 per year, typically split between grants, research and evaluation, program development, program support, and technical assistance.

The largest allocation of funds goes to grantees. Using these funds, AFI awards an average of 44 grants each year to programs across the United States. These are matching grants, at a minimum of $20,000 each.

== Problems ==
AFI faces four main problems: (1) lack of funding, (2) program inefficiencies, (3) poor publicity, and (4) inefficient long-term behavior.

=== Funding ===
Congress underfunds AFI each year because there are other programs that have priority, and are larger in size. Congressional oversights are caused because of heavy emphasis on other programs, and consequently, AFI has been scraping by on annual appropriations, which have been slashed by 40 percent in recent years.

Funding is further hindered by legislated rules; these rules prohibit grants of more than $1 million to any single organization and stops federal matching of IDAs at $2000 total. Because there are several groups that regularly receive grants from AFI, this limits the help AFI can give to organizations that are successful in dispersing funds. This also makes the process of applying and rewarding grants more expensive because it has to be done over and over again.

=== Inefficiency ===
The grant process is the main inefficiency within AFI. An application must navigate through several organizations before accomplishing anything, and the various stages are costly. The wages of extraneous workers are expended in order to guide a potential applicant. Essentially, this blocks potential grantees from receiving money and brings in extra costs to the program. The process of applying, and receiving grants can be improved by reducing administrative costs, clarifying specific sponsor organization and defining the grant process from congressional appropriation to an individual IDA.

=== Publicity ===
The third problem AFI faces is a lack of publicity; because a large portion of AFI's funds goes to other needs within the program, there is no focus on publicity. More people who would qualify need to apply and utilize this great asset; however, publicity is expensive, and recruiting is costly with this program's already strapped budget.

An innovative solution to this problem is to partner with existing organizations. Jackson and Orwell suggest that partnering with subsidized housing programs would lead AFI to the applicants it needs. The AFI website gives an example of integrating microenterprise development programs with AFI grantees to give applicants a more holistic approach. AFI has many avenues it can choose in order to connect with participants. Rather than running an expensive advertising campaign, which it can't afford, an innovative partnering strategy is an attractive answer to publicity.

=== Doesn't meet all needs of the poor ===
Another difficulty for AFI is the long-term needs of its participants. Although basic financial skills courses are mandatory for those involved, and AFI does succeed in helping many save for specific assets, many participants withdraw funds for short-term needs. For example, 64 percent of IDA holders made an unmatched withdrawal.
