= Edward Wolff =

American economist (born 1946)

- Born: April 10, 1946 (age 80)

Academic background
- Education: Harvard University (A.B., 1968); Yale University (M.Phil., 1972); Yale University (Ph.D., 1974)

Edward Nathan Wolff (April 10, 1946) is an American economist whose work concerns wealth and wealth disparity. He is a professor of economics at New York University, and is a research associate at the National Bureau of Economic Research. He also works at the Levy Institute Measure of Economic Well-Being a department of the Levy Economics Institute, where he is in charge of their distribution of income and wealth program.

== Early life and education ==
Wolff was born on April 10, 1946. In 1968, he obtained his A.B. from Harvard University. In 1972, he earned his M.Phil from Yale University. His 1974 Ph.D dissertation at Yale University was entitled "Models of Production and Exchange in the Works of Adam Smith and David Ricardo".

== Career ==
In 1974, Wolff became a professor at professor of economics at New York University. From 2003 to 2004, Wolff was a visiting scholar with the Russell Sage Foundation. In 2007, he and Ajit Zacharias proposed a schema on the inequality of employment. In a 2010 report by economist Richard Vedder and colleagues, Wolff is described as one of few academic scholars who have spoken out against problems in academia that have led to increasing number of college graduates being underemployed. Wolff is serving as an Associate Editor of the Structural Change and Economic Dynamics since 1989, and in the past held a position of a managing editor of the Review of Income and Wealth.

== Publications ==
Wolff is the author of numerous books.

- Growth, Accumulation, and Unproductive Activity: An Analysis of the Postwar US Economy (Cambridge University Press, 1987)
- Productivity and American Leadership: The Long View (with W. J. Baumol and S. B. Blackman; The MIT Press, 1989)
- Competitiveness, Convergence, and International Specialization (with D. Dollar; The MIT Press, 1993)
- Top Heavy: A Study of the Increasing Inequality of Wealth in America (Twentieth Century Fund Press, 1995)
- Retirement Insecurity: The Income Shortfalls Awaiting the Soon-to-Retire (Economic Policy Institute, 2002)
- Downsizing in America: Reality, Causes, and Consequences (with W. J. Baumol and A. S. Blinder; Russell Sage Foundation, 2003)
- Retirement Income: The Crucial Role of Social Security (with C. Weller; Economic Policy Institute, 2005)
- Does Education Really Help? Skill, Work, and Inequality (Oxford University Press, 2006)
- The Transformation of the American Pension System: Was It Beneficial for Workers? (W. E. Upjohn Institute for Employment Research, 2011)
- Productivity Growth: Industries, Spillovers and Economic Performance (with T. ten Raa; Edward Elgar Publishers, 2012)
- Productivity Convergence: Theory and Evidence, Cambridge Surveys of Economic Literature Series (Cambridge University Press, 2014)
- Inheriting Wealth in America: Future Boom or Bust? (Oxford University Press, 2015)
- A Century of Wealth in America (The Belknap Press of Harvard University, 2017)
