= Child trust fund =

Bank account for children

A child trust fund (CTF) is a long-term savings or investment account for children in the United Kingdom. New accounts can no longer be created as of 2011, but existing accounts can receive new money: the accounts were replaced by Junior ISAs.

The UK Government introduced the Child Trust Fund with the aim of ensuring that every child has savings by their eighteenth birthday, helping children get into the habit of saving; whilst teaching them the benefits of saving and helping them understand personal finance. The Child Trust Fund scheme was promised in the Labour Party's 2001 general election manifesto and launched in January 2005, with children born on or after 1 September 2002 eligible.

Eligible children received an initial subscription from the government in the form of a voucher for at least £250. In 2010/11, the Child Trust Fund policy was expected to cost around £520m, less than 0.5% of the £84bn UK education budget. Because the scheme allows for family and friends to top up trust funds, it has given a substantial boost to savings rates, particularly among the poor. According to the Children's Mutual, "In terms of changing people's behaviour, this is the most successful product there's ever been." For households with income of £19,000 a year, 30% of the children in that category are having £19 a month saved for them. Part of this is due to grandparents being more willing to contribute to funds, since the money cannot be diverted to the family finances. Creation of new funds and government payments into them were scrapped in January 2011 by the Savings Accounts and Health in Pregnancy Grant Act 2010.

== Background ==
Asset-based egalitarianism traces its roots to Thomas Paine, who proposed that every 21-year-old man and woman receive £15, financed from inheritance tax. In 1989, LSE professor Julian Le Grand proposed a similar idea, calling it a "poll grant". Subsequently the related concept of Individual Development Accounts was developed in the United States by Michael Sherraden. This approach - termed "asset-based welfare" by Sherraden - saw asset redistribution less as an egalitarian measure than as one which supported poverty reduction by encouraging saving. Sherraden argued that owning an asset led to people changing their way of thinking, being more likely to plan and invest in their future - in a way that providing people with an equivalent flow of income does not. The idea of a universal account for all children first appears in Sherraden's Assets and the Poor (1991).

In the UK, the idea took off in 1999/00 with a number of contributions to the New Statesman in 1999, including an article from Robert Reich endorsing the idea; and support in 2000 by the influential Institute for Public Policy Research. Sherraden's Center for Social Development collaborated with the IPPR, and a briefing paper by it remarked "It would be impossible to overstate the leadership and contributions of the Institute for Public Policy research in informing and shaping this new policy direction in the United Kingdom". This carried through into proposals being included in the Labour Party's 2001 general election manifesto.

The Child Trust Fund scheme was promised in the Labour Party's 2001 general election manifesto, and launched in January 2005, with children born on or after 1 September 2002 eligible. Over the course of the development of the policy up to implementation, it became increasingly focussed on encouraging the poor to save and to develop their financial skills, with less emphasis on the egalitarian redistribution of assets.

According to the Institute of Public Policy Research

The wealthy have always relied on assets to smooth the path into adulthood, but now every single child will be able to do the same. The lumpy costs, the risky decision, and upfront investment involved in making ones way in life will be eased, whether that means spending money on training, starting a businesses - or simply buying the suit needed to attend an interview... CTFs recognise that assets, not just income, can bring security and opportunities.

Sherraden argued that possessing wealth in your early adulthood improves life outcomes by its effect of changing attitudes:

Income only maintains consumption, but assets change the way people interact with the world. With assets, people begin to think for the long term and pursue long-term goals. In other words, while income feeds peoples' stomachs, assets change their minds.

=== Political opposition ===
Child trust funds were opposed by the Liberal Democrats at the 2005 general election with the manifesto pledging to move the money into early years programmes instead. Liberal Democrats have variously argued that recipients may spend the money unwisely, that the policy is overly restrictive in not allowing parents to access the money, and that the money could better be spent on pre-school development programmes.

Their policy has been criticised by Stuart White, who notes various historical examples of CTF-like policies proposed by Liberals in the past, and argues that the Child Trust Fund policy "gives direct expression to a deep, historic Liberal (and SDP) commitment to the ideal of ‘ownership for all’." He adds that "At a time of rising wealth inequality, and widespread asset poverty, the old Liberal slogan of ‘ownership for all’ has never been more urgent."

In April 2010, Julian Le Grand argued strongly against Conservative Party plans to means test the funds (limiting them to households on below £16,000 per year income), saying that "Confining CTFs to the poor would be divisive, and would result in low take-up and stigma. A universal endowment is a badge of citizenship." He added that if funding had to be cut from the scheme, it would be better to reduce the government's top-ups, and keep the scheme universal.

== Details ==
The funds are held in trust for the child until they turn 18, and the money is then theirs to use as they see fit. CTFs are managed by the parents/legal guardians of the child until the child reaches the age of 16. At this point, the child will have the option to take over management of the account including choice of provider and investment decisions. However, they will still not be able to withdraw funds from the account until reaching 18. The government has stated that they will be introducing a programme of education in personal finance in schools to enable 16-year-olds to competently manage their CTF.

All of the funds in the account are exempt from income tax and capital gains tax, including at maturity. However, the 10% dividend tax payable on franked income (UK share dividends) cannot be reclaimed. The UK government has stated that at age 18 it will be possible to transfer the entire CTF into an ISA to keep the tax-free status of the investment. If the CTF is withdrawn as cash, the tax benefits will be permanently lost.

=== Vouchers ===
- At birth: The government gave every eligible child a voucher worth £250 to open the account, and also a further £250 directly into the accounts of children in low-income families.
- At age 7: The government would have made an additional payment of £250 into the account, with a further £250 for children in low-income families.
- At age 11: The government was consulting on the possibility of a further voucher at this age.

If vouchers were not invested within one year of issue, HM Revenue and Customs would open a stakeholder account on behalf of the child: 30% of accounts were opened in this way. There is a significant correlation between these HMRC-allocated accounts and low-income families, and there is a high incidence of 'Addressee Gone Away' accounts and accounts never registered by the family in this segment. Subscriptions by individuals were in addition to any voucher subscriptions.

== Subscriptions ==
Parents and other family members or friends can pay a maximum per year into their child's fund; the year is counted from birthday to birthday, not a tax year. The maximum tax-free limit is subject to change. Currently, (tax year 2020/2021) it stands at £9000 per year. Before that it was £4,368 and £4,260 per year. Originally the subscription limit was £1,200, and then from 1 November 2011, the limit was raised to £3,600 and has been increasing gradually each year since then, in line with increases in Junior ISAs. Any gains or dividends will be tax free (except for the 10% tax on UK share dividends). Stakeholder accounts cannot set the minimum contribution above £10, but the provider can set a lower minimum.

=== Eligibility ===
Every child born on or after 1 September 2002 was eligible for the CTF, as long as:

- child benefit has been awarded for them;
- they are living in the United Kingdom; and
- they are not subject to immigration controls

The children of Crown servants posted abroad – including the Armed Forces – qualify because they are treated as being in the UK.

=== Investment options ===
Most advisers recommend equity-based CTFs, and the fact accounts allocated by HM Revenue and Customs are put into stakeholder products indicates that the government also believes equities are the best option over such a long period.

- Stakeholder accounts invest in shares, with a set of rules ("stakeholder standards") to reduce financial risk. These include provision for money in the account being gradually moved to lower risk investments or assets when the child reaches age 13. This is to help to produce a stable return in the run up to the child's 18th birthday. The charge on a stakeholder account is limited to no more than 1.5 per cent a year, whereas charges on all other types of CTF account are not limited in this way.
- Savings account. These operate in a similar way to a bank deposit account; there is a rate of interest and the nominal value of the funds is secure.
- Non-stakeholder account. Invests funds according to the type of product. These accounts are not protected by the "stakeholder standards".

CTF funds can be transferred between providers. Rules for transfers are similar to those for Individual Savings Accounts – customers should inform the new provider they wish to use and they will undertake the move. No penalty or fee can be imposed for transferring the account, except for the cost of selling shares (such as dealing charges) in equity accounts.

== Abolition ==
On 24 May 2010, the Chancellor of the Exchequer George Osborne and Chief Secretary to the Treasury David Laws announced that the £250 top up payments into the child trust fund would cease in August 2010, with no payments for newborns from the end of 2010. The Savings Accounts and Health in Pregnancy Grant Act 2010 facilitates the abolition of the fund.

== See also ==
- Child Trust Funds Act 2004
- Baby bonds
- Asset-based egalitarianism
- Individual development account
- 'Third Way' political philosophy
