= Productive aging =

Activities in which older people engage

Productive aging refers to activities which older people engage in on a daily basis. Older adults have opportunities and constraints which are related to the productive aging process. The community and society need to develop more options for older adults to choose their way of being engaged in the community and contributing to others. Things such as policy changes and resource commitments are important to promote productive aging. One example of productive aging is retirement which moves older adults from paid forms of productivity to non-paid activities. Many activities can give older adults opportunities and constraints related to the productive aging process. These activities include retirement, employment, economic well-being, leisure, religious participation and spirituality, membership in community associations and volunteerism, education, and political action. Older adults will find many opportunities to engage in activities which contribute to society or follow personal creative activities.
