= George Warren Brown School of Social Work =

Graduate school of social work and public health in Missouri, United States

Brown School at Washington University
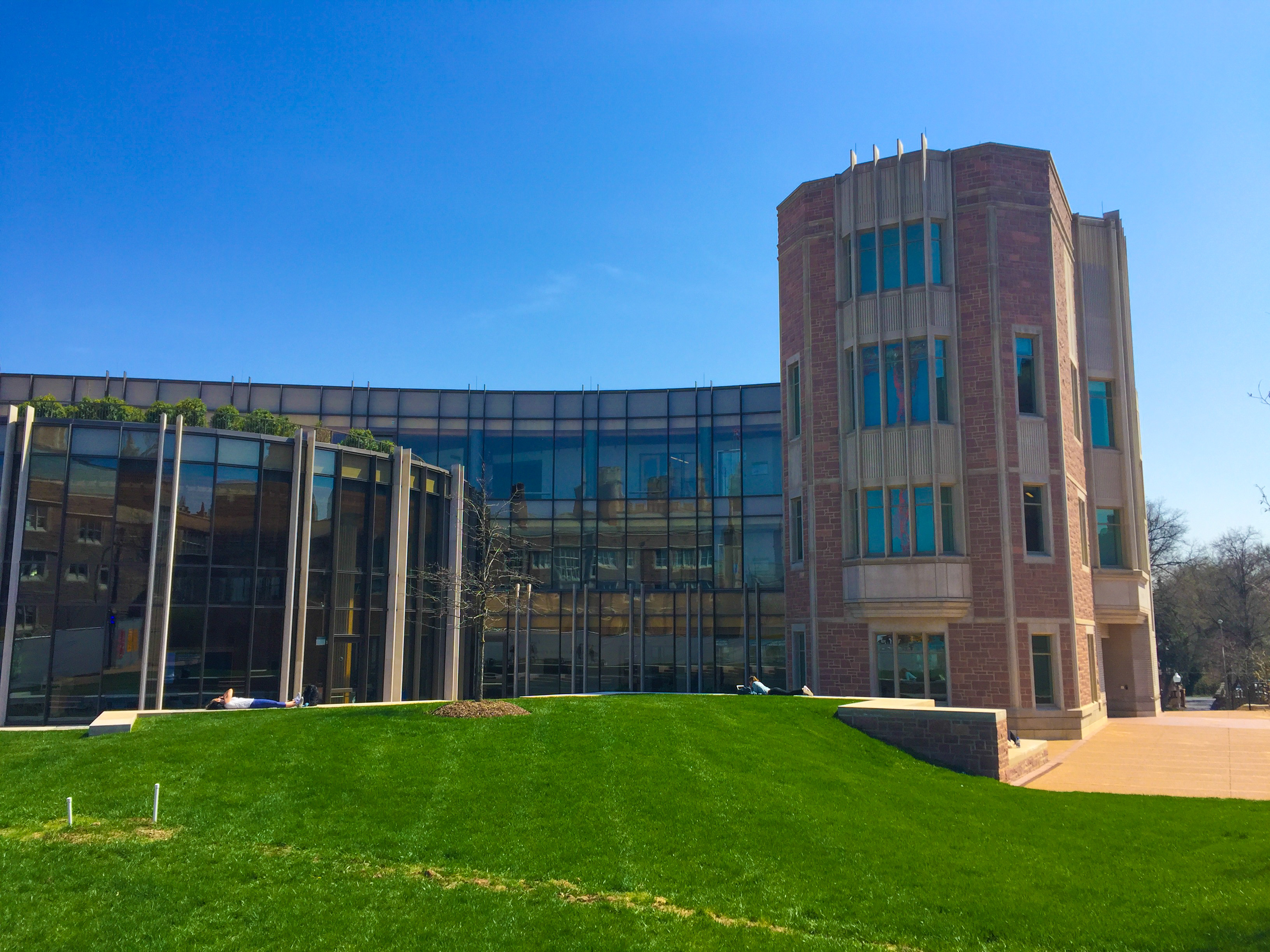
- Brown School's Hillman Hall
- Type: Private
- Established: 1925
- Parent institution: Washington University in St. Louis
- Dean: Dorian Traube
- Faculty: 142
- Postgraduates: 502
- Location: St. Louis, Missouri, USA; 38°38′49″N 90°18′20″W
- Campus: Suburban
- Website: brownschool.washu.edu

The Brown School is the graduate school for social work and public health of Washington University in St. Louis. Located on Washington University's Danforth Campus, adjacent to Forest Park, the school is recognized by the Council on Social Work Education and the Council on Education for Public Health. It is also a member of the Association of Schools and Programs of Public Health.

The Brown School originated from the Department of Social Work at Washington University, which was founded in 1925. It was endowed in 1945 by Bettie Bofinger Brown, who named the school after her husband, George Warren Brown, a St. Louis philanthropist and co-founder of the Brown Shoe Company. The school was the first at Washington University to admit Black students, and the first in the United States to have a building dedicated to social work education.

== History ==
=== Formation: 1925-1945 ===
In 1925, an academic social work program was introduced at Washington University under the leadership of the social scholar Frank J. Bruno. The program was initially called the Washington University Training Course for Social Workers and belonged to the Department of Sociology in the College of Liberal Arts.

In the following year, the program transferred to the School of Commerce and Finance, which was then renamed the School of Business and Public Administration. In 1928, the Department of Social Work was established with money from the estate of George Warren Brown, a prominent St. Louis shoe manufacturer, at the bequest of his wife, Betty Hood Bofinger Brown.

The Department of Social Work expanded over the next ten years to employ nine full-time and 15 part-time faculty members teaching 65 courses. In response to its size, Washington University dedicated Brown Hall to the Department in 1937. This was unprecedented at the time, as no other North American university had constructed a building solely for social work education.

As Bruno planned his retirement, he drafted an ordinance to graduate the social work program from an academic department to a degree-granting school. Then University Chancellor, George Throop, resisted this proposal for several years. When Throop resigned in 1944, the Department appealed to the Board of Directors, establishing the George Warren Brown School of Social Work in the following year.

Bruno was instrumental in boosting the public welfare administrator Benjamin E. Youngdahl to the deanship of the new school, although his candidacy had been challenged due to his perceived lack of academic training. Knowing this, Bruno continued to interview candidates from an interim leadership position until he could appeal to the interim Chancellor, Harry Brookings Wallace. Bruno succeeded, and Youngdahl became the inaugural Dean of the Brown School in 1945.

=== Early Years: 1945-1962 ===
A ten-year development plan was presented by Youngdahl to Chancellor Arthur H. Compton in January 1947. The Brown School began recruiting faculty for a program in "economic well-being and the deeper source of happiness that is self-realization". This included focuses on social work with groups and psychiatric social work (clinical social work), the latter of which garnered significant grant funding from the American Association of Schools of Social Work thanks to the efforts of early faculty member Margaret Williams.

From 1946-1947, Youngdahl, Stuart Queen, and the faculty vigorously petitioned Compton to admit Black students to the Brown School. They succeeded, and a cohort of eight Black women matriculated as graduate students in 1948. By 1952, the School had awarded 520 graduate degrees in its first seven years.

By the end of Youngdahl's deanship in 1962, the Brown School conferred 757 Master of Social Work degrees and 12 Doctor of Social Work degrees.

=== Curriculum Reform: 1962-1972 ===
Wayne Vasey was chosen as the new dean in 1961. He began advocating for a series of curricular reforms introducing courses in social policy and economic development to address criticisms of social work in the United States at the time. Existing faculty resisted these changes, and implementation was further slowed by a controversial, year-long leave of absence taken by Vasey in 1964 to lead the St. Louis Human Development Corporation, a newly-formed, local anti-poverty organization.

In November 1966, the Council on Social Work Education (CSWE) visited to conduct an accreditation review. While the School passed, the CSWE criticized what it perceived as unresponsiveness to larger changes in social work education as well as Vasey's involvement in national politics. Despite vigorous defense from the faculty, Vasey resigned to teach at the University of Michigan following a series of critical letters from Chancellor Thomas H. Eliot.

Ralph Garber was chosen as dean in 1968. The School convened a series of working groups that resulted in an increased number of elective courses, the conversion of the DSW degree into a PhD program, and a commitment to increase Black student enrollment. While Garber's tenure resulted in institutional change, dissent among faculty continued. The Brown School also began operating in a financial deficit, with a majority of its monies coming from federal grant funding.

Garber resigned in January 1973. Chancellor William Danforth, concerned about the state of the Brown School amid what faculty member Ralph Pumphrey described as "the verge of disintegration" with "standing committees ground to a halt", appointed Ronald Feldman as acting dean with the task of finding new leadership to stabilize its reputation.

=== Growth in Profile: 1974-1993 ===
Shanti Khinduka, the Assistant Dean of Social Work at Saint Louis University accepted the deanship in 1974. During his tenure, Khinduka convened faculty and students to instate a competency-based curriculum, building off of Nancy Carroll's critique of the School's decades of individualized, elective-heavy design. After an accreditation review that prompted an extensive community outreach effort in 1977, the CSWE approved the Brown School.

Despite federal disinvestment from social programs under the Reagan Administration, the 1980s saw the Brown School financially stabilize, and by 1995, it had increased more than sevenfold from $5 million to $36 million. Khinduka also made efforts to attract new interest from international students and promote faculty producing research. This resulted in the Brown School becoming recognized in 1991 as the most published faculty body in the country between 1977-1987, as well as the origin of "evidence-based practice" as a central theme in national social work discourse.

=== School Expansion: 1993-2015 ===
The 1990s saw the opening of several research centers at the Brown School. This included the Center for Mental Health Services Research, the Center for Social Development, and the Kathryn M. Buder Center for American Indian Studies, the first academic research center dedicated to American Indian health in the United States.

In 1998, the Brown School and Washington University dedicated Alvin Goldfarb Hall, a four-story building that doubled the capacity of the school. Following multiple years of financial and faculty growth, Khinduka retired in 2004 after 30 years as dean.

The University acquired Edward F. Lawlor, the dean of the University of Chicago's Crown Family School of Social Work, Policy, and Practice in 2004. During his deanship, Lawlor oversaw the creation of Hillman Hall, which again doubled the Brown School's space on the Washington University campus. The School also established partnerships with Fudan University in Shanghai.

Throughout this time, Lawlor and the Brown School played a critical role in the creation of Washington University's Institute for Public Health. Accordingly, the School's Master of Public Health program enrolled its first class in 2009. Lawlor concluded his tenure in 2016 and was succeeded by Mary McKernan McKay from New York University.

Following Dean McKay's transition to the Washington University Office of the Provost as Vice Provost of Interdisciplinary Initiatives, the Brown School underwent a transitional period with the installation of two interim Co-Deans, Rodrigo Reis and Tonya Edmond, who served in those roles from late 2021 to summer 2023. Following a national search, Dorian Traube succeeded as the Neidorff Family and Centene Corporation Dean of the Brown School in August 2023, arriving from the USC Suzanne Dworak-Peck School of Social Work.

== Educational Programs ==
The School offers professional programs in Master of Social Work (MSW), Master of Public Health (MPH), and Master of Social Policy (MSP) degrees. It also provides PhD programs in Social Work and Public Health Sciences. Optionally, graduate students can enroll in one a series of dual degree programs with other graduate schools at Washington University.

In October 2023, Washington University in St. Louis announced its intent to form an independent School of Public Health as part of a 10-year strategic plan entitled "Here and Next". This plan will eventually relocate the university's public health academic programs to the School of Public Health.

== Research Centers ==
The Brown School includes faculty conducting research in the disciplines of social work, public health, and social policy. Similarly, its research centers represent scientific study across a number of areas.

Brown School Research Centers
Center name	Mission
Black Families, Racism, and Resilience Lab	Examines the impact of culturally positive resources on the well-being of Black children, youth, and families. Research focuses on the evolution of attitudes, beliefs, and behaviors over time. Aims to assist educators, practitioners, and scholars in comprehending how policies, laws, and everyday interactions shape the attitudes, beliefs, and behaviors of Black Americans. Objective is to provide culturally responsive and empowering solutions that strengthen Black American communities.
Centene Center for Health Transformation	The Centene Center for Health Transformation is a unique academic-industry collaboration between the Brown School at Washington University in St. Louis, the Center for Advanced Hindsight at Duke University, and Centene Corporation. The center is a Community-Corporate-Academic Health Care Partnership that advances life-centric health research to improve lives so communities can thrive.
Center for Diabetes Translation Research	Aims to eliminate disparities in Type 2 diabetes by translating evidence-based interventions to high-risk populations. The NIH-funded research center is a collaboration between the Brown School and the Medical School and was formed to address health literacy and health communication; dissemination and implementation; health economics and health policy; and community-based participatory research and cultural competency.
Center for Health Economics & Policy	The Center for Health Economics & Policy promotes the advancement of evidence-based research with a focus on enhancing health outcomes. It actively shares this research with policymakers and various stakeholders.
Center for Innovation in Child Maltreatment Policy, Research and Training	The Center for Innovation in Child Maltreatment Policy, Research, and Training advances scientific knowledge to prevent child maltreatment and promote positive outcomes through effective interventions. It emphasizes the interconnection of research, practice, and training, ensuring that policy and practice align with the latest scientific findings. The Center focuses on urgent needs in the field and employs collaborative approaches relevant to real-world situations. Notably, two research projects aim to enhance maltreatment screening capacity using innovative strategies. This includes utilizing integrated administrative data to inform child welfare and multi-system responses, as well as improving the science of newborn screening for maltreatment risk and engaging new parents in supportive services.
Center for Mental Health Services Research	The Center for Mental Health Services Research, through its national network of collaborative research partners, works with public social service agencies to build a base of evidence designed to address the challenges of delivering mental health services to vulnerable populations. The center is one of only 11 centers of its kind in the country and the only one part of a social work school.
Center for Obesity Prevention and Policy Research	The Center for Obesity Prevention and Policy Research develops and disseminates new knowledge to inform the creation and implementation of programs and policies designed to prevent obesity.
Center for Public Health Systems Science	Launched in 2001 and helps create an innovative understanding of how policies and organizational systems affect public health problems. The Center translates research results to inform chronic disease prevention policy and improve public health practices.
Center for Social Development	The Center for Social Development's domestic and international research focuses on building assets of individuals and families so they can invest in life goals such as homes, education, and enterprise development. The Center's work also explores issues of civic engagement to ensure the people of all ages and economic levels actively participate in our society.
Center for Violence and Injury Prevention	The Center for Violence and Injury Prevention is a CDC-funded research center that pulls from multiple disciplines and partnerships to advance the prevention science and develop evidence-based, real-world strategies for preventing child maltreatment, intimate partner violence, sexual violence, and suicide attempts.
Health Communication Research Laboratory	The Health Communication Research Laboratory is one of the leading centers in the U.S. dedicated to the research, development, and dissemination of health communication programs that enhance the health of individuals and populations. Most recently, they have been involved in National Institutes of Health Community Engagement Alliance (CEAL)-funded COVID-19 misinformation monitoring work.
Implementation Research Institute	Promotes the progress of implementation science in the field of mental health. Its primary focus is to support the career growth and development of early to mid-career investigators.
Initiative for Social Work and Forced Migration	Strives to take a leading role in social work and social welfare research, education, and training to enhance the quality of life and well-being for individuals who have been forcibly displaced across international borders. It serves as a virtual hub for scholars in social work specializing in international forced migration. The initiative seeks to establish certificate programs that acknowledge scholars and service providers who adhere to its standards. Additionally, it aims to engage in international student exchange programs, attract graduate students who are interested in the field, and organize conferences. The initiative also actively participates in open-source data collection and sharing for studies related to forced migration.
Institute for Public Health	Addresses the complex health issues and health disparities facing the St. Louis region and the world.
Institute of Clinical and Translational Sciences	Provides a range of programs and services aimed at expediting the transformation of research discoveries into practical applications. These efforts are focused on enhancing prevention, diagnosis, and treatment methods in real-world settings.
International Center for Child Health and Development	Fosters the well-being of youth and families in low-resource communities, with a specific focus on sub-Saharan Africa. Its mission is to contribute to poverty reduction and enhance health and developmental outcomes. ICHAD conducts meticulous applied research centered around interventions that strengthen families economically and empower them. These interventions aim to address the complex interplay between poverty, disease, and health-related risks affecting youth. The center also strives to raise public awareness and garner support for social programs that build upon existing assets. Additionally, ICHAD advocates for evidence-based policies and programming informed by research findings.
Kathryn M. Buder Center for American Indian Studies	The Kathryn M. Buder Center for American Indian Studies is one of the most respected centers in the nation for academic advancement and the study of American Indian issues related to social work.
Prevention Research Center	The Prevention Research Center in St. Louis is a joint effort between Washington University in St. Louis and Saint Louis University. The Center explores the behaviors that place Americans at risk for chronic diseases such as obesity, cancer, and stroke. Center researchers are particularly concerned with the improvement of the quality of life among special populations: the young, elderly, and the uninsured.
SMART Africa Center	The SMART Africa Center (Strengthening Mental Health and Research Training) is a collaborative center that operates across multiple disciplines. Its main objective is to address the gaps in child mental health services and research in Ghana, Kenya, and Uganda. The center is financially supported by the National Institute of Mental Health. Through a population approach, the SMART Africa Center aims to improve child mental health by bringing together a diverse consortium of stakeholders. This consortium includes academic institutions, government agencies, non-governmental organizations (NGOs), and community partners from Ghana, Kenya, Uganda, South Africa, and the United States. Together, they focus on tackling the burden of child mental health and addressing service gaps in sub-Saharan Africa. The center emphasizes the implementation and expansion of evidence-based practices to achieve its goals.
Social System Design Laboratory	Advances the science and field of system dynamics for human services including social work, education, medicine, and public health. The Lab is a resource for students, researchers, and professionals to help build the capacity of those who want to learn and apply system dynamics in order to address specific problems in organizations and communities.

== Facilities ==
The Brown School is located on Washington University's Danforth Campus, a 169-acre area shared with the School of Law, School of Arts & Sciences, Olin Business School, McKelvey School of Engineering, and Sam Fox School of Design & Visual Arts. Research also occurs at the Washington University School of Medicine through partnerships with the Institute for Public Health and other medical research centers.

Built in 1937, Brown Hall was the first academic building in the United States dedicated to social work education. From 1937-1945, Brown Hall included the offices of historians, political scientists, anthropologists, and sociologists. In 1945, the building became the official location of the newly endowed George Warren Brown School.

Decades later, in 1998, Washington University dedicated Goldfarb Hall. This doubled the school's capacity. The building was named after Alvin Goldfarb, a St. Louis area philanthropist who was the former president of Worth Stores and chairman the Jewish Federation of St. Louis.

Hillman Hall, a third facility, was dedicated in 2015. The 105,000 square-foot building was designed by Moore Ruble Yudell. It is named for Jennifer Hillman, owner of the Images and Ideas design agency, and Thomas Hillman, founder of the investment firm FTL Capital Partners. It is notable for its Leadership in Energy and Environmental Design (LEED) Platinum certification. It is estimated to be 41% more energy efficient than buildings of comparable size.

== Rankings and reputation ==
As of 2024, it is ranked 2nd out of 319 school for social work in the United States by U.S. News & World Report.

== See also ==
List of social work schools
