= Asset-based egalitarianism =

Form of egalitarianism

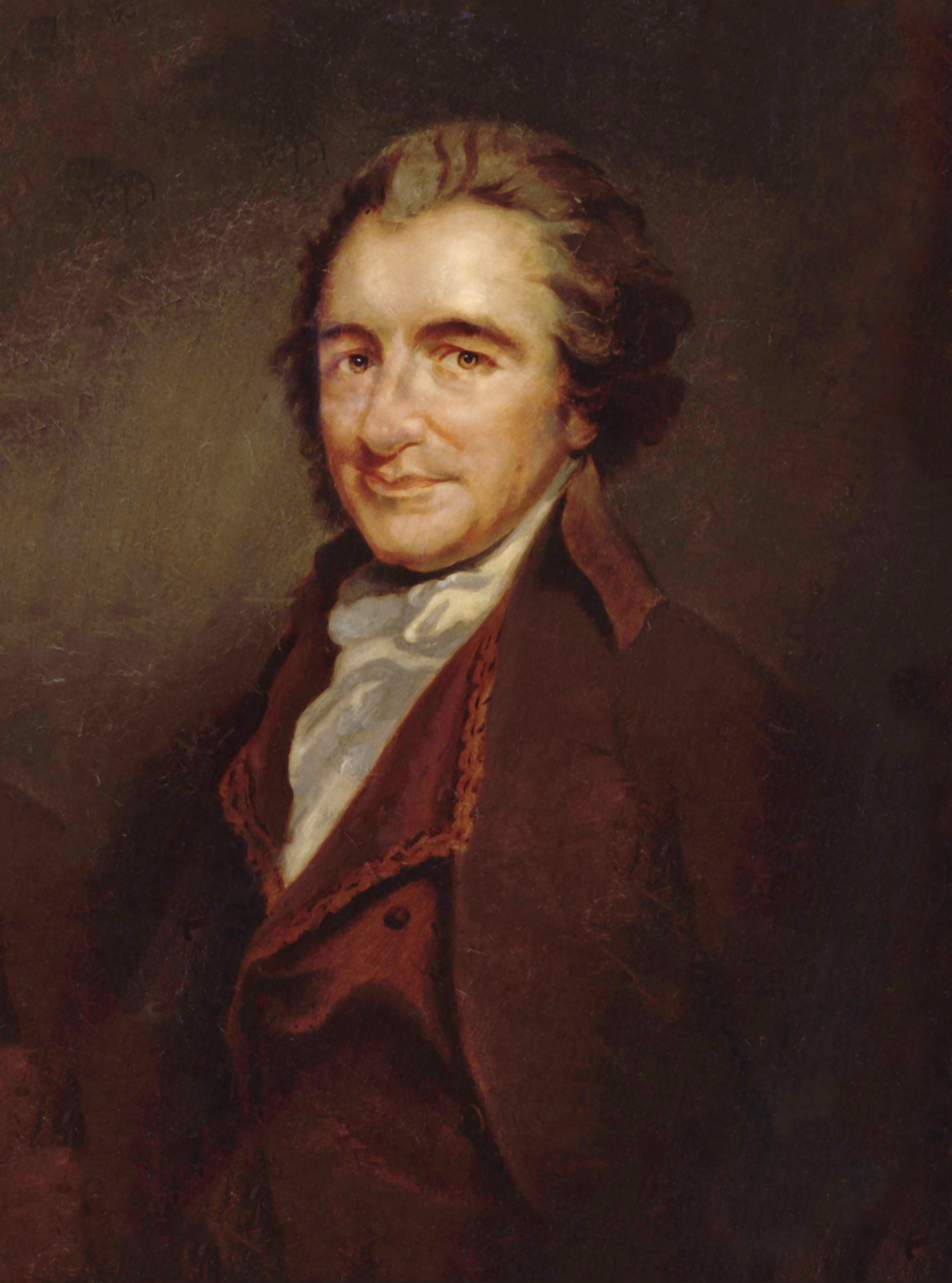
Thomas Paine

Asset-based egalitarianism is a form of egalitarianism which theorizes that equality is possible by a redistribution of resources, usually in the form of a capital grant provided at the age of majority. Names for the implementation of this theory in policy include universal basic capital, stakeholding and ownerism, and are generally synonymous within the equal opportunity egalitarian framework.

== Historical development ==
The idea of granting every citizen some capital has its roots in ancient Israel and the biblical institution of Jubilee. According to regulations found in the Book of Leviticus, every fifty years everyone was supposed to return to their own property. Given that property was initially allocated to households in an egalitarian manner, this system implied that every person had the right to a certain plot of land.

In more modern times, the idea has been around since Thomas Paine (January 29, 1737 – June 8, 1809) in his work Agrarian Justice from 1795, and complemented his other thesis of basic income.

Two independent schools of thought were developed on the subject, involving individuals from the American labor movement and scholars of the Belgian School. However, the same reasoning (given by both schools) behind the basic capital proposal is the redistribution of wealth usually funded by an inheritance tax in order to provide a universal and unconditional sum of money (or capital assets) at the age of majority. From most authors, the intention was to create a nominal grant for everyone based on a deserved natural inheritance of the earth.

== Relationship with policy ==
In the policy format, asset-based egalitarianism is usually seen as the opposite policy proposal of Philippe Van Parijs and his thesis of basic income, but asset-based egalitarian proposals have received less academic attention. However, more recently the wave of third way politics has seen much more emphasis placed on responsibility and equality of opportunity and has reopened an old debate.

Some famous recent work on the policy efficaciousness of universal basic capital or asset-based egalitarianism has been conducted by Bruce Ackerman and Anne Alstott in The Stakeholder Society. In this policy proposal, the method of funding the 'stake' was by means of a wealth tax and provides a sum of $80,000 for those reaching the age of majority.

In actual policy, Gordon Brown and the British Labour Party initiated the United Kingdom Child Trust Fund, while in the United States the idea has been implemented in the form of individual development account and argued for by Michael Sherraden. These remain the nearest practical examples.

One of the motivations of the related policy such as the Child Trust Fund is clear from this excerpt:

The account can give your child a head start as a young adult. It will help your child understand personal finance and the importance of saving for their future. The account belongs to them and when they turn 18, the money is theirs to use as they think best.

== Criticism ==
Asset-based egalitarian policies, such as the Ackerman and Alstott proposals, are often criticised as not being egalitarian. Due to different people having different abilities and talents to utilise financial wealth, there is always a risk that those without formal financial education would alienate their own freedom by dissipating their capital or "stakeblowing". Stuart White argued that unless education corrected for this, there would be an inegalitarian outcome, as people fundamentally have different asset-management capacities. See Time preference and Deferred gratification.

== See also ==
- American Labour Movement
- Baby bonds
- Child Trust Fund
- Citizens dividend (as 'basic income')
- Individual Development Accounts
- property-owning democracy
- Social Credit
- 'Third Way' political philosophy
- Universal basic income (similar proposal)
