= Individual development account =

Asset building tool

An individual development account (IDA) is an asset building tool designed to enable low-income families to save towards a targeted amount usually used for building assets in the form of home ownership, post-secondary education and small business ownership. In principle IDAs work as matched savings accounts that supplement the savings of low-income households with matching funds drawn from a variety of private and public sources.

While anti-poverty policy makers have traditionally focused on issues of income and consumption, an expanded vision of poverty alleviation has emerged in recent years—one that encourages savings, investment, and asset accumulation in conjunction with, not instead of, traditional anti-poverty programs. Assets play a vital role in poverty alleviation by providing not only economic security but also a psychological orientation that encourages low income families to save and plan for the future. In his book, Assets and the Poor: A New American Welfare Policy (1991), Michael Sherraden proposed establishing individual savings accounts for the poor calling for the government and the private sector to match individual contributions to IDAs as a means of encouraging savings and breaking the cycle of poverty. Sherraden argued that asset and saving accumulation requires institutional structures and incentives and that asset based development policies can have psychological, social and economic impacts. Since then IDAs have been adopted by United States federal legislation via the Personal Responsibility and Work Opportunity Reconciliation Act of 1996 and in more than 40 states of the country. Evidence of IDA programs also exists outside of the continental United States especially in Hawaii, Sub-Saharan Africa., the UK, and also all around Europe.

== How IDAs work ==
Most IDAs are offered through programs that involve partnerships between local nonprofit organizations, also called IDA program sponsors, and financial institutions. The IDA program sponsor recruits program participants and provides financial literacy classes. Additionally they may also provide counseling and training for efficient saving practices and money management. When recruiting, IDA program sponsors need to ensure that participants meet certain criteria that the Corporation for Enterprise Development specifies as follows:

- Income: Most IDA programs specify a maximum household income level for IDA eligibility. Depending on the program sponsor, the eligible maximum income levels can range from 200% of the poverty level to 80% of area median income.
- Earnings: The source of the savings are another important criterion. Many IDA programs require that all or part of the savings accumulated during the course of an IDA program should come from "earned income". This is usually defined as the income coming from a paycheck, but welfare, disability, social security, or unemployment checks also qualify as earnings. An example of ineligible source of income would be money received as a gift.
- Net Worth: Besides looking at maximum household income, some IDA programs additionally take into consideration household assets such as a car, home, savings, etc. when determining IDA eligibility.
- Credit History: Certain barriers to savings are also taken into account when determining eligibility. One of them is debt from credit cards and loans. Therefore, too much debt or bad credit history can prevent one from qualifying for an IDA.

The number of eligibility criteria employed varies by the IDA program sponsor and their funding sources. Once recruited, participants open IDA accounts with the partnering financial institution and begin making deposits. Account holders generally make monthly contributions to an account, usually over a period of one to four years, and their savings are matched by donations typically at a rate ranging from 1:1 to 3:1. Match dollars for IDAs come from many different places, such as government agencies, private companies, churches, or local charities. Any individual, organization or business can contribute match dollars to IDAs. In most cases, donors can get a tax deduction for contributions to IDAs, and they are also recognized for helping others in their community. Each month, IDA participants receive a report telling them how much money is accumulating in their IDA, which is a sum of their individual savings, matched dollars and interest. Individual and matching deposits are never co-mingled; all matching dollars are kept in a separate, parallel account. When the IDA account holder has accumulated enough savings and matching funds to purchase the asset and has completed a required financial education course, payments from the IDA are made directly to the asset provider to complete the asset purchase.

== Purpose ==
IDAs reward the monthly savings of working poor families who are trying to:

- purchase their first home;
- pursue post-secondary education;
- start or expand a small business.

Additionally, some IDA programs allow participants to save for home repairs, computers, automobiles, or retirement.

=== Purchasing a first home ===
Home ownership is generally representative of stability and financial advancement since it is an important means of saving and asset accumulation. In the United States especially home ownership can be a leading step towards attaining the American Dream. IDAs can help participants achieve their goal of homeownership by encouraging savings and providing matched funds to overcome the lack of income and liquid wealth needed to make a down payment or pay housing closing costs. Even if the savings from an IDA do not result in a full purchase amount, a recent study shows that the probability of a household owning a home increases by 41% by just having $1000 in liquid wealth, which is a feasible goal under an IDA program.

=== Pursuing post-secondary education ===
Access to post secondary education can positively impact one's economic status as well as critical thinking abilities. For low income families education can provide a route out of poverty and towards social mobility. Savings from IDAs can make the goal of post secondary education attainable. This is specially significant for low-income single mothers for whom earning a post secondary education can break the cycle of inter generational poverty and whose opportunities in gaining such an education might be marginalized by federal legislation like The Personal Responsibility and Work Opportunity Reconciliation Act of 1996. For such women and several low income communities, IDAs provide a means of investing in a more prosperous future.

=== Starting or expanding small businesses ===
data show that for every 1 percentage point increase in the rate of entrepreneurship in a state, there is a 2 percent decline in the poverty rate. Entrepreneurship is another step towards reducing poverty where IDAs can play a helpful role. According to Stephen Slivinski, a senior economist at the Goldwater Institute, data across the United States shows that between 2001 and 2007 1% increase in the rate of entrepreneurship in a state led to up to 2% decline in the rate of poverty. Small business start up and expansion also have a demonstrated record of success in assisting individuals such as welfare recipients, people with disabilities, immigrants and refugees as well as ex-offenders returning to their families and communities. Matched savings from IDAs can provide the seed capital and/or funding for further expansion for such established businesses and aid in poverty alleviation.

== Programs ==
=== Programs in the US ===
Since its inception, the concept of IDA programs and asset-based development has been strong and persistent in the United States. IDA programs in the US differ in funding sources and their targeted population.

==== Assets for Independence ====
The Department of Health and Human Services currently funds the majority of IDAs through Assets for Independence (AFI), a competitive grant program administered by the Office of Community Services (OCS). OCS awards grants to nonprofit entities and state, local and Tribal governments that administer AFI projects. Grantees are required to raise an equal contribution of nonfederal funds to match the federal AFI grant. Just in 2012 alone, AFI granted over US$13 million to over 60 institutions including city councils, nonprofit organizations, universities and other community based organizations.

Project participants receive up to $2,000 in federal matching funds. In order for participants to be considered eligible for an IDA through AFI, participants must be TANF eligible, EITC eligible, or have income at or below 200% of the poverty line. Since the inception of the program in 1999, AFI has enabled more than 60,000 low-income earners save through an AFI IDA.

==== Office of Refugee Resettlement IDA Program ====
The Office of Refugee Resettlement's (ORR) Individual Development Account (IDA) program is designed to assist refugees in purchasing assets as a means of increasing their financial independence, encouraging integration into the American financial system and increasing refugee knowledge of financial and monetary topics. ORR began funding IDA programs in October 1999. ORR invites qualified entities to submit competing grant applications for five-year projects that will establish, support, and manage IDAs for eligible low-income refugee individuals and families.

ORR IDA grantees provide matches of up to $1 for every $1 deposited by a refugee in a savings account. The total match may not exceed $2,000 for individuals or $4,000 for households. Upon enrolling in an IDA program, a refugee commits to and signs a savings plan agreement which specifies the savings goal, the match rate, and the amount the refugee will save each month. Basic financial training is provided by the grantee.

Since 1999, more than 20,000 refugee families have saved through an ORR IDA program. Eighty-one percent (16,588) have used $74.5 million in savings and match to purchase assets valued at more than $351 million. This represents a 748% leverage of match funds. An average of $4,503 was used by each refugee saver to purchase an asset. Over $226 million has been leveraged in loans for refugee asset purchases.

==== Beginning Farmer and Rancher IDA Program ====
The Beginning Farmer and Rancher Individual Development Account (BFRIDA) program, authorized in the 2008 Farm Bill, matches the savings of and provides financial education to agricultural entrepreneurs. The objectives of BFRIDA are to promote local economic development in rural communities; increase farming opportunities among individuals who may be new to this country or otherwise lack collateral; and strengthen food security and independence.

BFRIDA allows up to $3,000 of an individual farmer or ranchers' savings to be matched by local IDA providers at a 1:2 rate. Thus, farmers and ranchers can receive up to $6,000 in match, totaling $9,000 in leveraged savings. Program participants are required to complete financial training programs and develop a savings plan before the funds may be withdrawn for a farming related asset purchase.

The legislation authorizes up to $25 million – or five million a year over a five-year period – for the program. While any tribe, non-profit, or local or state government can submit an application to receive a grant, a 50% local match is needed to obtain the federal grant which may not exceed $250,000. If fully funded, 4,000 agricultural entrepreneurs could receive matched savings over the tenure of the pilot program. Funding is yet to be appropriated. The program is to be administered by USDA's Farm Services Agency.

==== State programs ====
North Carolina has one of the leading statewide networks of IDA programs with 32 local IDA sites in 55 North Carolina counties. These 32 programs provide matching funds and support to more than 500 low-income account holders. There is a four-step process when acquiring an IDA; this includes; Introduction and Orientation, Opening Accounts, Economic Literacy and Training, and finally Withdrawal, Purchasing Assets and beyond.

=== Programs in the developing world ===
Although the concept of asset building development has seen greater prominence in the US and the developed world, there is evidence of such programs and their successful impact in developing countries as well. Sub Saharan Africa is one key region where these programs are being experimented with. Like the programs in the US funding for IDA programs in Sub Saharan Africa comes from government agencies, private companies and local charities. Much of this funding is directed towards Children's Development Accounts or CDA's, which are similar to IDA's except that they are meant to encourage savings and asset accumulation amongst children often since their birth. CDA's have especially taken root in this region where poverty and HIV/AIDS leave several of them orphaned and without resources. Multiple programs promote microsavings for children and youth throughout the developing world today. For instance, the Co-operative Bank and Equity Bank operate child savings accounts in Kenya. Public banks make such programs accessible in Thailand and Sri Lanka and microfinance institutions perform a similar job in Papua New Guinea. Additionally, there is Columbia University's SUUBI program in Uganda, funded by the National Institute of Health, the Younger Savers Accounts of DFCU bank in Uganda, and the Assets-Africa program funded by the Center for Social Development at Washington University. Researchers like Fred M Ssewamala suggest that the funding and support garnered by these programs demonstrate the potential of asset building initiatives in poverty alleviation and propose further research and experimentation of tools like IDA's.

== Impact ==
The first systematic study of IDAs was the American Dream Demonstration (ADD) — a foundation-funded national demonstration of IDAs organized by CFED and the Center for Social Development that ran from 1997 to 2003. This study has thus far yielded two major reports:Saving Performance in the American Dream Demonstration published in 2002 and Evaluation of the American Dream Demonstration published in August 2004 by Abt Associates. Data and evaluation from these reports show positive significant impact on participants' economic, social and psychological well-being.

=== Economic impact ===
National research on the impact of IDA programs in the United States has revealed that:

- IDA participants are:
  - 35% more likely to own a home
  - Nearly twice as likely to attend college
  - Are 84% more likely to own a business
- More than half of program graduates who previously received public assistance no longer receive assistance after completing the program
- Prior to enrollment, 90% of IDA savers did not use direct deposit and more than half did not have a savings account
- There is a low incidence of foreclosure among IDA participants

The programs in Sub Saharan Africa also show that asset-building interventions have potential utility as a policy solution for improving the economic well-being of poor households in Sub Saharan Africa. In Uganda, IDA participants had $1,323.01 more in financial assets, $1,672.18 more in total wealth and $2,048.20 more in net worth on average. Researchers at the Center for Social Development argue that considering that approximate average annual cash income of a village household in rural Uganda is $340 per year, this intervention effect on net worth over a 13-month period would represent the equivalent of over 5 years of cash income. An effect size of this magnitude is likely to positively alter economic well-being and quality of life.

=== Social impact ===
One possible goal of asset building is for residents, businesses, and institutions to become interconnected with each other and the mainstream economy. Having assets such as those made possible by IDA accounts gives an individual more wealth as well as disposable income. The community benefits from the increased spending power among residents, which may attract new businesses or increase home ownership rates. IDAs can also play an important role in fostering social inclusion. In the past few decades, there has been growing concern about the level of marginalization currently experienced by vulnerable groups and about unequal distribution of wealth. The economic stability that assets purchased through IDAs provide enables the creation and maximization of opportunities for meaningful participation of socially vulnerable people like racial minorities and women in economic, social, and political institutions under conditions that enhance their well-being and capabilities.

=== Psychological impact ===
Studies addressing the relationship between parental assets and children's well-being show positive effects on self-esteem among adolescents in the case of higher parental assets. Scholars have also argued that when people own assets or are engaged in asset-building activities, they internalize the feeling that they have a stake in society, and therefore they cognitively pay greater attention and participate more in economic, civic, and political activities.

== Criticisms ==
Like many other tools aimed towards economic development, Individual Development Accounts are met with criticisms regarding their impact and cost effectiveness.

=== Costs ===
While costs are declining, IDAs can still be expensive to administer costing about $64 per participant per month excluding the cost of matched funds. Since IDAs also run the risk of being used as a checking or savings account in addition to its intended purpose, they may accumulate extra administrative costs associated with ordinary checking and savings accounts. Despite the decline in IDA costs over time, IDAs have yet to achieve economies of scale to sustain low costs. In fact, administration costs for IDAs tend to be higher than that of 401(k)s and IRAs. Ray Boshara warns that "this high cost may have a sobering effect on the expansion of IDAs". However, a proper cost-benefit analysis will require further research to see whether the benefits of IDAs exceed its costs or if other programs aimed at poverty alleviation deliver more benefits per unit of cost than IDAs. Therefore, it is not certain whether IDAs are the best use of scarce public funds towards economic development.

=== Unequal impact ===
Although evidence from the American Dream Demonstration shows that IDAs do enable the poor to save and acquire assets, not all findings agree that IDAs necessarily increase household net worth. A possible reason for this is the unequal impact of IDAs. The restriction that some IDA programs place regarding the use of only earned income towards IDA savings can be a barrier for people discriminated in the job market. This includes people with disabilities and women both of whom face barriers in securing employment and thus are less able to benefit from IDAs. Furthermore, certain groups of population are more likely to drop out of IDA programs than others. A study looking at several demographic variables including age, marital status, gender, race/ethnicity, household composition and residence location and their effect on drop out rates found that young (aged 14 – 20) single men are more likely to drop out than old (aged 20 – 70) currently formerly committed women. African Americans and Native Americans are also more likely to drop out as well as households with young children and households located in rural areas. This means that some groups with higher poverty rates like African Americans and rural dwellers are not being benefited as much by this poverty alleviation tool. However, women who are another group of marginalized people are able to take advantage of Individual Development Accounts.

== See also ==
- Asset-based community development
- Asset-based egalitarianism
- Asset management
- Child trust fund
- Poverty in the United States
