= Hamilton-Brown Shoe Factory =

Hamilton-Brown Shoe Factory may refer to:

- Hamilton-Brown Shoe Factory (Boonville, Missouri), listed on the National Register of Historic Places (NRHP)
- Hamilton-Brown Shoe Factory (Columbia, Missouri), listed on the National Register of Historic Places (NRHP)
- Hamilton-Brown Shoe Factory (St. Louis, Missouri), listed on the NRHP in St. Louis, Missouri
