= Attract China =

American tourism company

Attract China LLC is an American tourism company that helps U.S. businesses promote their hotels, restaurants, retail stores, attractions and deals to Chinese tourists, the fastest-growing and highest-spending tourist segment in the U.S., through digital platforms and printed guides. Attract China also markets to Chinese college students, who comprised the largest segment of foreign students attending the top 25 U.S. schools hosting international students during the 2012–2013 academic year.

Attract China is headquartered in Boston, Massachusetts and operates a Chinese-language website in Beijing, China.

== History ==
Attract China, headquartered in Boston, MA and with operations in Beijing, China, was co-founded by Evan Saunders and Sam Goodman in 2011. Saunders serves as the Attract China's CEO and Goodman is president of the company.

== Operations ==
Attract China is focused on connecting American businesses, including hotels, restaurants, retailers and attractions, with independent Chinese travelers, the fastest-growing and highest-spending tourist segment in the U.S., through digital platforms and guides in Mandarin. Attract China also markets to Chinese college students, who comprised the largest segment of foreign students attending the top 25 U.S. schools hosting international students during the 2012–2013 academic year.

Attract China initially operated in seven U.S. markets, including New York, NY; Boston, MA; Las Vegas, NV; Los Angeles, CA; and San Francisco, CA. In 2014, the company expanded to Seattle, WA; Chicago, IL; and Hawaii. Also during 2014, the company announced plans to add five more markets before the end of the year. Attract China also operates a Chinese-language website in Beijing, China. The company generates revenue through advertisements placed in various marketing vehicles by client brands.

== Clients ==
Attract China currently works with some 300 clients in North America including The Ritz-Carlton, Mandarin Oriental Hotel Group, Sonesta Collection, Westin Hotels and Resorts, Stuart Weitzman, Samsonite, and Premium Outlets.

== Products ==
=== Xiao Yao Dao online portal ===
Xiao Yao Dao, which translates to "The Gateway for Getaway," is a China-based Chinese-language destination portal operated by Attract China. The portal provides Chinese tourists with travel information about hotels, restaurants, retailers, attractions, and special deals in the U.S.

=== Chinese-language maps ===
Attract China creates and provides maps in Chinese for each American city in which it operates. The passport-sized foldout maps feature restaurants, tours, attractions, shops, services and more, along with a map of the city and its public transit system.
