= Hamilton-Brown Shoe Factory (Columbia, Missouri) =

- U.S. National Register of Historic Places
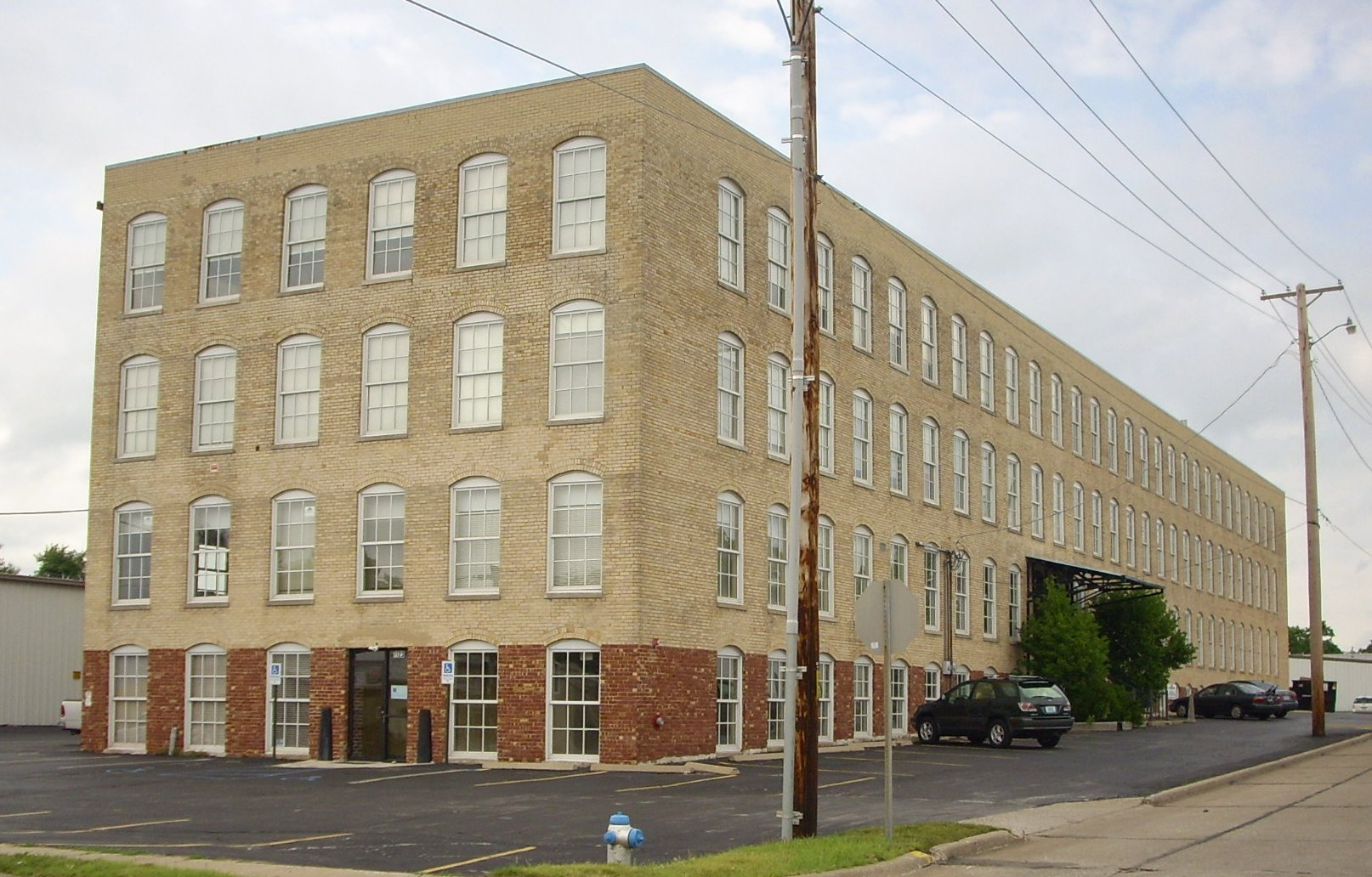

- Location within Missouri Location within the United States
- Location: 1123 Wilkes Blvd., Columbia, Missouri
- Coordinates: 38°57′38″N 92°19′22″W
- Area: less than one acre
- Built: 1907
- Architectural style: Early Commercial
- NRHP reference No.: 02000791
- Added to NRHP: July 19, 2002

The Hamilton-Brown Shoe Factory was the first large scale industrial operation in Columbia, Missouri. It was built in 1906-1907 by the Brown Shoe Company, the largest shoe manufacture in the world at the time. It was the first plant built outside of St. Louis and was operational from 1907-1939 The building today has been converted into offices.

The company was a large manufacturer of men's, women's and children's shoes. In 1888, the Hamilton-Brown Shoe Company built a factory at the northeast corner of 21st and Locust in a fading upper-class residential neighborhood in St. Louis. Already a force in St. Louis industry, the company doubled its sales between 1890 and 1900. By the early 20th century, Hamilton-Brown with six manufacturing facilities claimed world leadership in boots and shoes.

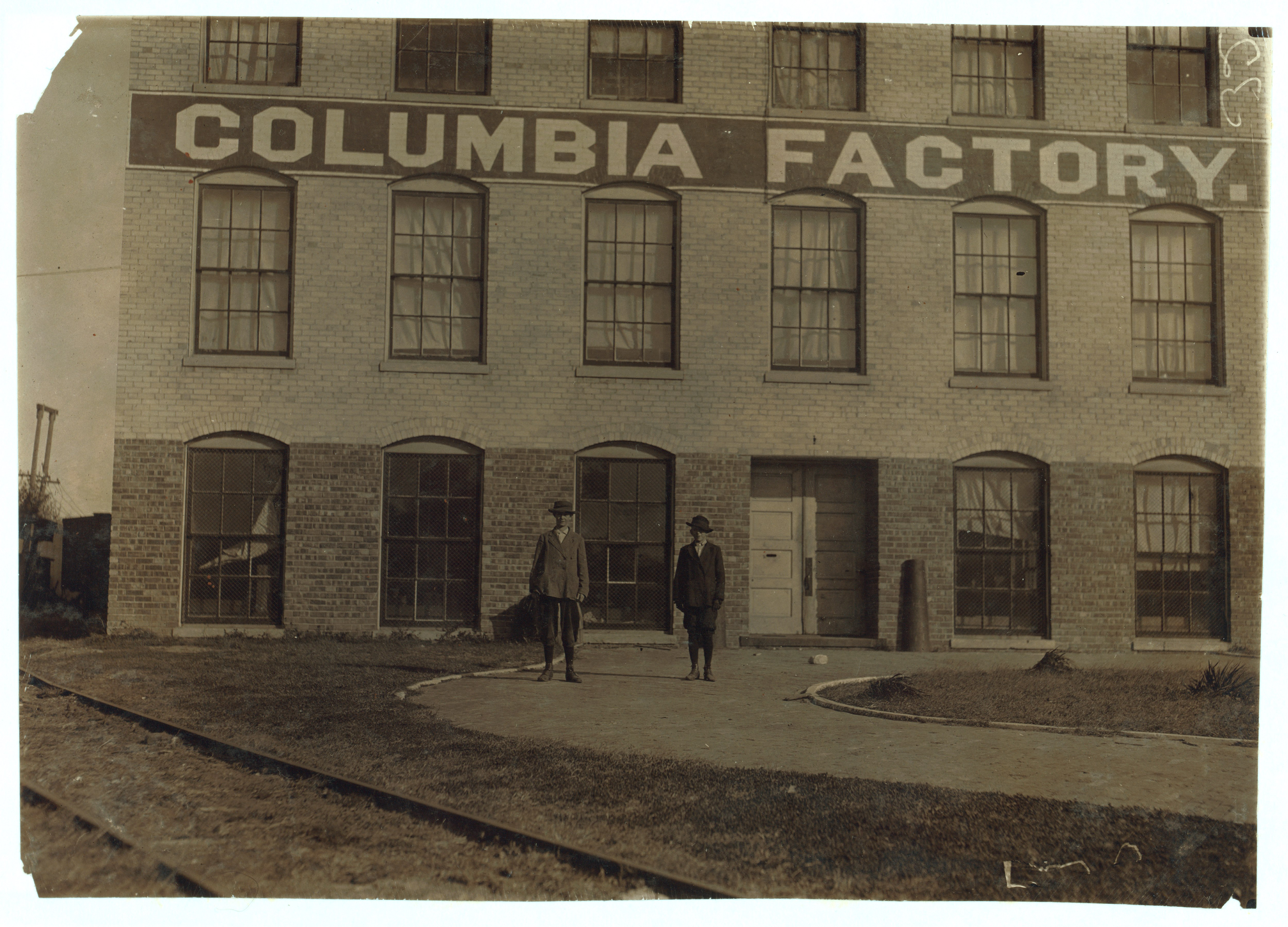
Hubert Homesley (13) and Erba Conley (15), Hubert has just been laid off

At one time, the company was the largest shoe manufacturer in the world. Their product line brand included the "American Gentleman" and "American Lady".

It was listed on the National Register of Historic Places in 2002.

== See also ==
- Hamilton-Brown Shoe Company Building
- Brown Shoe Company Factory
- Brown Shoe Company's Homes-Take Factory
