= Albert B. Groves =

American architect

Albert Bartleton Groves (1866–1925) was an American architect who practiced in the St. Louis, Missouri, area.

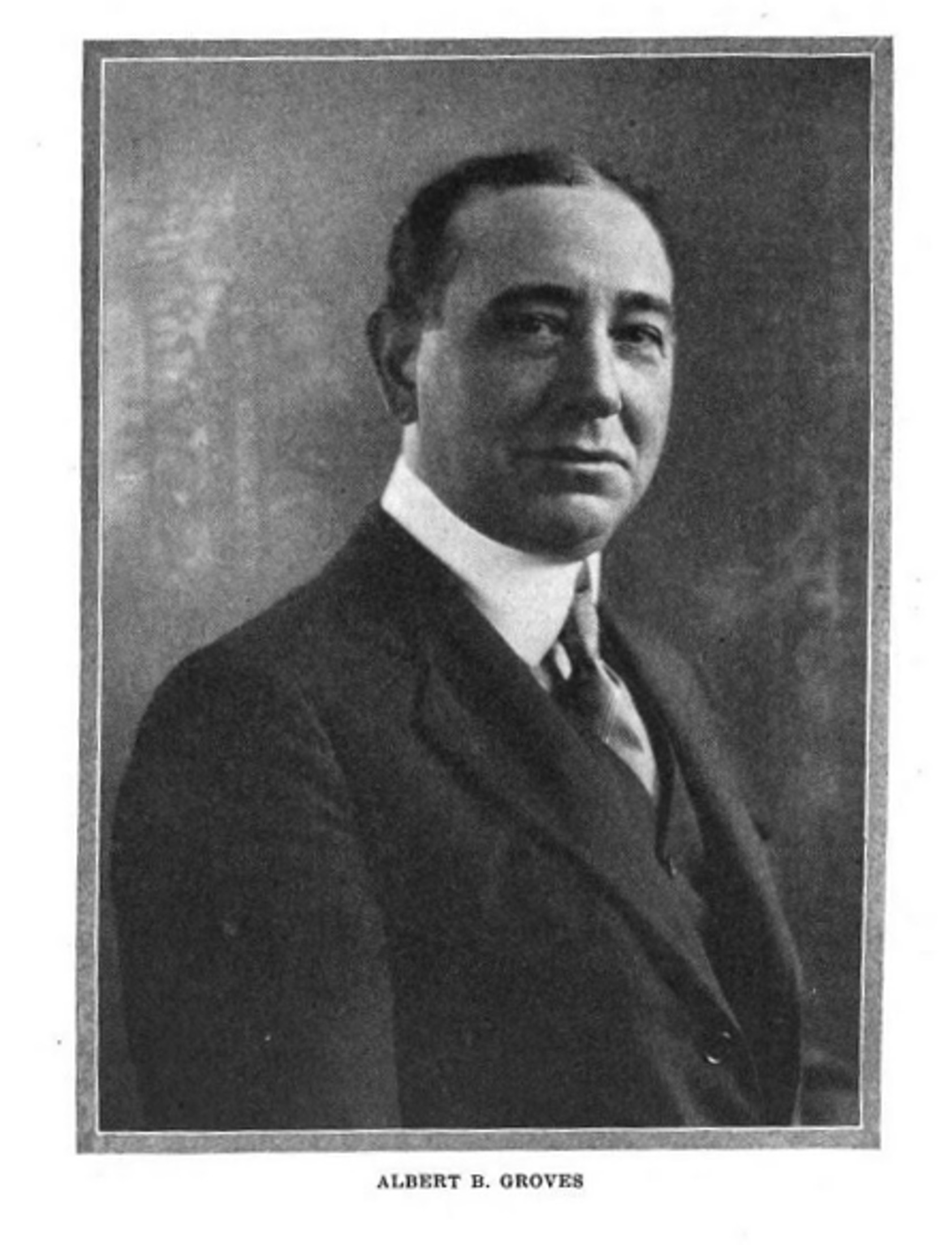
Albert B. Groves, circa 1921

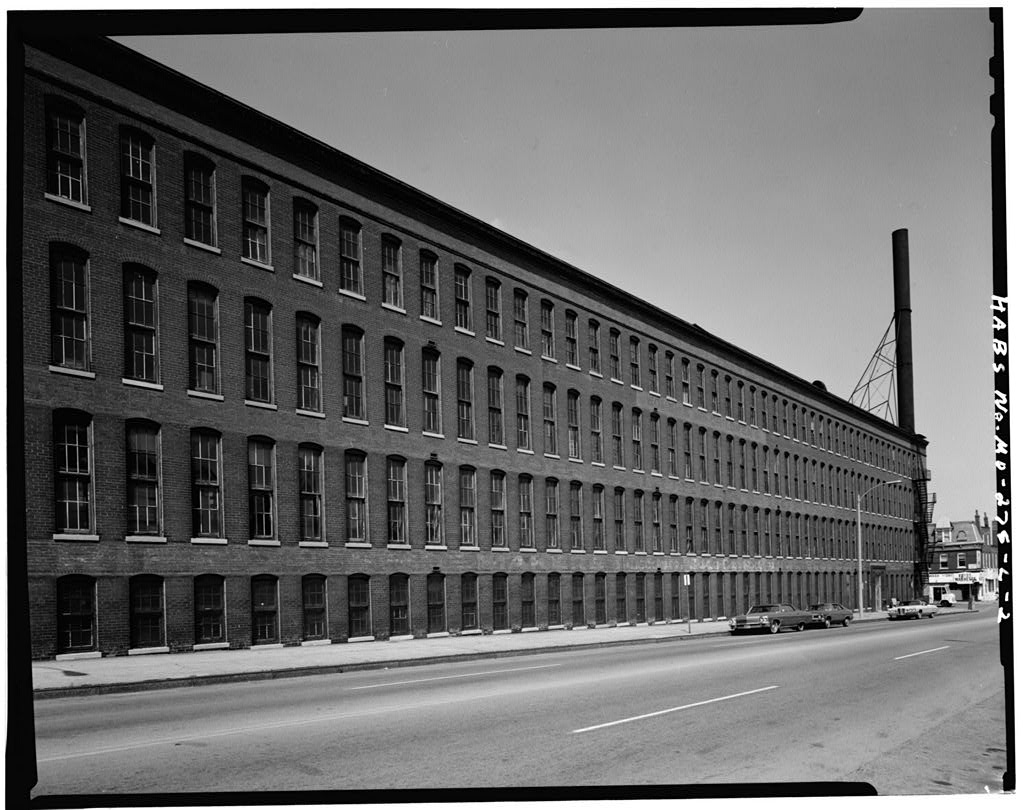
Brown Shoe Company's Homes-Take Factory, St. Louis, 1904

Groves was born in Providence, Rhode Island, and attended architectural courses at Cornell University. After periods studying in France and Italy, and working under Denver architect Frank E. Edbrooke for two years, Groves began practicing in St. Louis with partners as Gable, Weber and Groves in 1891. The firm Weber & Groves ended in 1905 with the death of Weber. Groves practiced independently thereafter.

Groves designed his share of houses in St. Louis's private places, and by 1921 had designed 18 separate churches in the area, but made a specialty of the design of relatively simple concrete and brick factories for garment manufacturers in the city, who demanded speed, flexibility and ingenuity. Grove designed multiple buildings for these manufacturers—eleven separate buildings and an 8-story headquarters for Brown Shoe alone—which, along with alterations, expansions, and changes of ownership, can present a challenge in identifying his work.

== Work ==
Buildings designed by Groves (or Weber & Groves) include (in St. Louis if not otherwise indicated):

- Fountain Park Congregational Church, 1895 (Gable, Weber & Groves), 1895
- American Brake Company Building, 1920 N. Broadway (Weber & Groves), 1901
- Brown Shoe Company's Homes-Take Factory, aka the International Hat Company Warehouse, 1201 Russell Blvd. (Weber & Groves), 1904
- Union Avenue Christian Church, 733 Union, 1904 (chapel), 1907 (main bldg)
- Grim Building, 113-115 E. Washington St., Kirksville, Missouri (Weber & Groves), 1905
- Drygoodsman Building, 1726 Washington, 1907
- Maryland Hotel, 205 N. Ninth St., 1907
- Blackwell-Wielandy Building, 1601-09 Locust St. 1907
- Tuscan Temple, 5015 Westminster Place, in the Holy Corners Historic District, 1908
- East Bank Building, 1511 Washington Avenue, 1909
- Monogram Building, for milliners Rosenthal-Sloan, 1706 Washington Avenue, 1910
- First National Bank, 100 N. Main, St. Charles, Missouri, a contributing element to the St. Charles Historic District, 1911
- City Hospital Main Building, Lafayette Street, 1912
- Majestic Hotel, 1017-23 Pine St. and 200-10 N. 11th St., 1914
- Missouri State Life Insurance Company, later the General American Life Insurance Co. Buildings, 1501-1511 Locust St., 1914, expanded 1923
- Westminster Presbyterian Church, 5300 Delmar, 1916
- Moloney Electric Company Building, 1141-1151 S. 7th St. for the 1916 expansion
- Brown Shoe Company Factory, 212 S. State St., Litchfield, Illinois, 1917
- Advertising Building, 1627-1629 Locust St., 1917
- McElroy-Sloan Shoe Company, 2035 Washington, a contributing property to the Lucas Avenue Industrial Historic District, 1919
- McElroy-Sloan Shoe Company, 2101 Lucas (715 N. 21st Street), a contributing property to the Lucas Avenue Industrial Historic District, 1920
- Sporting News Building, later the Emerson Electric Company Building, 2012-2018 Washington Ave., 1920
- First Presbyterian Church of Winnebago, Winnebago, Illinois, 1921
- New Masonic Temple (St. Louis), 3681 Lindell Boulevard, as associate architect with Eames and Young, 1926
- Principia Page-Park YMCA Gymnasium, 5569 Minerva Ave. St. Louis, 1910 (expanded by William B. Ittner in 1919)
- Stix, Baer and Fuller Dry Goods Company's "Grand Leader" Relay Station, 3712-3748 Laclede Ave., 3717 Forest Park Blvd. St. Louis
- One or more buildings in the City Hospital Historic District, Roughly bounded by Lafayette Ave., Grattan St., Carroll St., Dillon St., St. Ange St., 14th St., and Carroll St., in St. Louis
- One or more buildings in Locust Street Automotive District, 2914-3124 Locust and 3043 Olive St. Louis
- One or more buildings in a boundary increase to the Locust Street Automotive District, 3133-3207 & 3150-3202 Locust St., in St. Louis
