= Shoes.com (defunct company) =

American online footwear and apparel retailer (1996-2017)

- Industry: Shoes
- Founded: 1996; 29 years ago
- Defunct: January 27, 2017
- Headquarters: Seattle, Washington, United States
- Products: Shoes, clothing

Shoes.com was an American online retailer of footwear and apparel from 1996 to 2017. The company owned and operated SHOES.COM, OnlineShoes.com, and SHOEme.ca, and was a part of the Hardy Capital Portfolio.

== History ==
Sean Clark credits his wife as the inspiration behind the company after he was asked to drive across the border from Canada into the United States to pick up shoes she had ordered online that could not be delivered to Canada. Determined to come up with a local solution, Clark founded SHOEme.ca in Vancouver with the help of his co-founder and former boss, Roger Hardy.

On July 15, 2014, Hardy Capital Corporation acquired SHOEme.ca and Seattle-based OnlineShoes.com, from Brown Shoe Company, and announced Roger Hardy as the chairman and CEO of SHOEme.ca.

Six months later, SHOEme.ca acquired Shoes.com, and shortly after the company announced a rebranding under Shoes.com. OnlineShoes, which was the first online footwear retailer in the US, continued to operate under its own name.

On May 20, Shoes.com announced that it had raised net proceeds of approximately $45 million.

Shoes.com employed 250 people across North America, generated revenue of approximately $200 million annually, and offered a selection of 500 brands to its 8 million customers across the US and Canada. As of May 2015, the company was valued at $320 million. The company was headquartered in Vancouver.

On January 27, 2017, Shoes.com reported it would shut down operations.

== Products ==
The company had two private footwear and accessory lines, PIKA and Hardy Design Works, which were both sold exclusively on SHOES.COM.
