= Stuart Weitzman (fashion house) =

American luxury footwear brand

- Type: Subsidiary
- Industry: Fashion
- Founded: 1986
- Founder: Stuart Weitzman
- Products: Shoes, handbags, accessories
- Parent: Caleres, Inc.
- Website: www.stuartweitzman.com

Stuart Weitzman is an American luxury footwear brand founded by Stuart Weitzman, building on his earlier experiences with footwear design and manufacturing. The brand produces luxury footwear and accessories. The company later expanded internationally by distributing its products in multiple countries and opening retail locations outside the United States. The brand has gained visibility through collaborations with celebrities and appearances at award shows such as the Academy Awards. The brand is currently owned by Caleres, Inc.

== History ==
Designer Stuart Weitzman founded his fashion house in 1986. Prior to starting his namesake label, Weitzman worked in his father's company, Seymour Shoes.

In 1983, prior to the launch of the brand, Aretha Franklin thanked Weitzman for designing her shoes while accepting her award at the American Music Awards. This recognition helped Weitzman develop a reputation within the footwear industry and was an early step toward opening the fashion house.

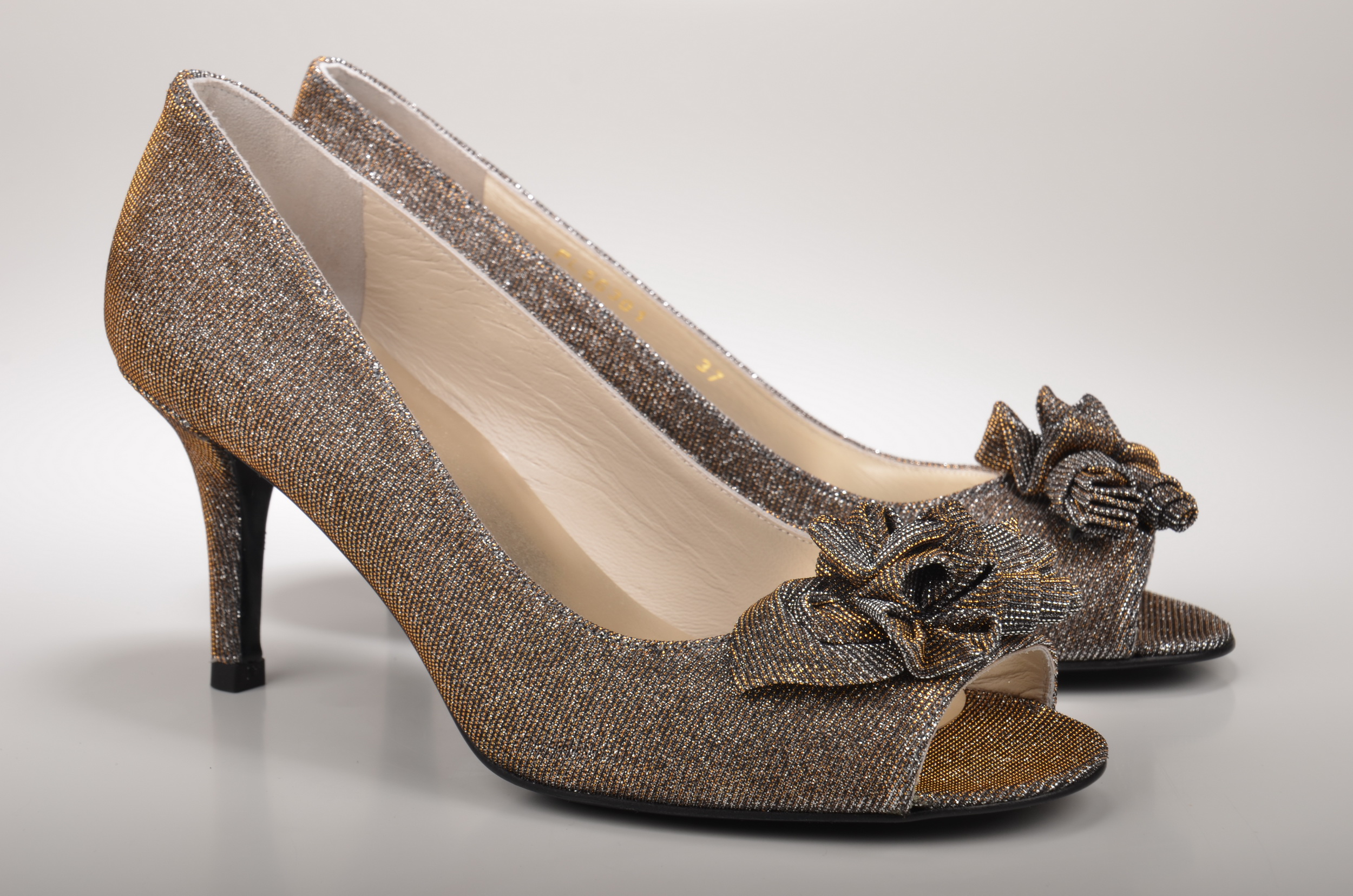
Stuart Weitzman Babbo Peep-Toe Pumps

From its early years, Stuart Weitzman footwear was produced primarily in Elda, Spain. The brand later gained recognition in the luxury retail market through its presence in fashion media and its association with celebrities.

== Stores ==
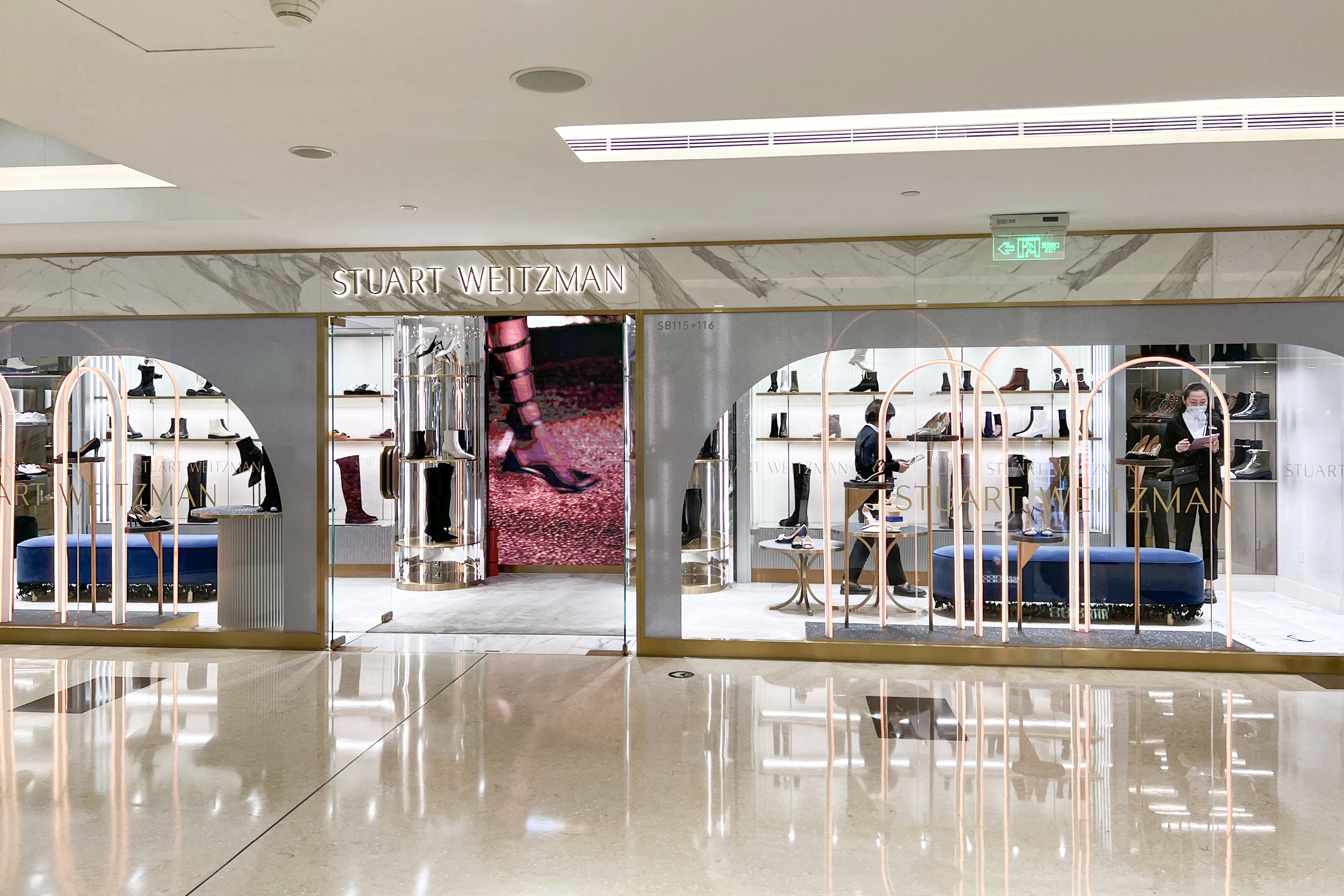
Stuart Weitzman store in China

Stuart Weitzman has retail stores across the United States, Europe, and Asia. The brand's first boutique opened in 1995 in New York City on Madison Avenue. Today the brand operates 94 physical stores and outlets across international markets. In addition to its brick-and-mortar locations, the brand maintains an e-commerce platform and distributes through luxury retailers such as Nordstrom and Saks Fifth Avenue.

== Acquisition ==
Stuart Weitzman was privately owned until 2005, when the private equity firm Irving Place Capital acquired a 40% share. In 2010, Jones Apparel Group purchased a 55% stake for $180 million. Weitzman retained a 45% stake until 2012, when he sold the remainder to Jones Apparel Group.

In January 2015, Sycamore Partners (which had acquired Jones Apparel Group) sold the company to Coach, Inc. (later renamed Tapestry, Inc.) for $574 million.

Weitzman continued to run the business as executive chairman and designer until 2017, when he retired and appointed Loewe designer Giovanni Morelli as the brand's first creative director. Morelli resigned a year later and was replaced in 2018 by Edmundo Castillo as head of design.

In 2025, Tapestry, Inc. announced it was selling Stuart Weitzman to Caleres, Inc., a footwear company that owns brands including Sam Edelman, Famous Footwear, and Veronica Beard. The deal closed for $105 million, representing a significant decrease in value compared to the 2015 sale. Before the sale, Stuart Weitzman represented 3.6% of Tapestry's total annual revenue and reported a yearly loss of $21.2 million, up from $6.7 million the previous year, reflecting a decline in the brand's performance.

== Awards ==
The brand has received recognition for its advertising campaigns. In 2002, its first print advertisement depicted a Dalmatian with shoe silhouettes replacing its spots, earning a Clio Award for its approach to marketing.

A video campaign titled "These Boots Are Made for Walkin' " featuring Kate Moss earned the brand a second Clio Award.

A 2016 campaign featuring Gigi Hadid, Joan Smalls, and Lily Aldridge wearing the block-heel Nudist Sandal earned the brand a third Clio Award.

== Brand ambassadors and partnerships ==
=== Red carpet and custom designs ===
In 2002, Weitzman created the Million Dollar Shoes, adorned with 464 diamonds, which actress Laura Harring—known for Mulholland Drive—wore to the Academy Awards. This red-carpet strategy continued in 2013 when Weitzman introduced the Nudist sandal, with Diane Kruger as the first celebrity to wear the style publicly. In 2025, Ariana Grande wore custom Stuart Weitzman "Stuart Power" pumps to complement her archival Givenchy gown at the Golden Globes.

=== Advertising campaigns and ambassadors ===
Beginning in 2012, the brand's advertising campaigns featured Kate Moss, Gisele Bündchen, Gigi Hadid, and Kendall Jenner as faces of the brand. Seeking to expand its presence in Asia in 2019, the brand collaborated with Chinese actress Yang Mi on a collection. In 2025, Emma Chamberlain was named global ambassador for the Fall 2025 and Spring 2026 lines.

=== Performance footwear ===
Stuart Weitzman has a history of creating footwear for musical artists on tour. Between 2013 and 2025, Beyoncé made multiple appearances in custom Highland boots and Nudist heels, including at the 2013 Grammy Awards, on the Mrs. Carter Show World Tour (2013), and on the Renaissance World Tour (2023). Custom boots were also produced for the Cowboy Carter Tour, and 50 pairs of the resulting "Vinnie Cowboy 85" boots were subsequently sold to the public. Taylor Swift wore custom Stuart Weitzman boots for her 1989 World Tour in 2015.
