= Naturalizer =

Naturalizer may refer to:

- in mathematics, the naturalizer of an infranatural transformation
- Naturalizer, a shoe brand of Caleres
