= Maryland Hotel =

- U.S. National Register of Historic Places
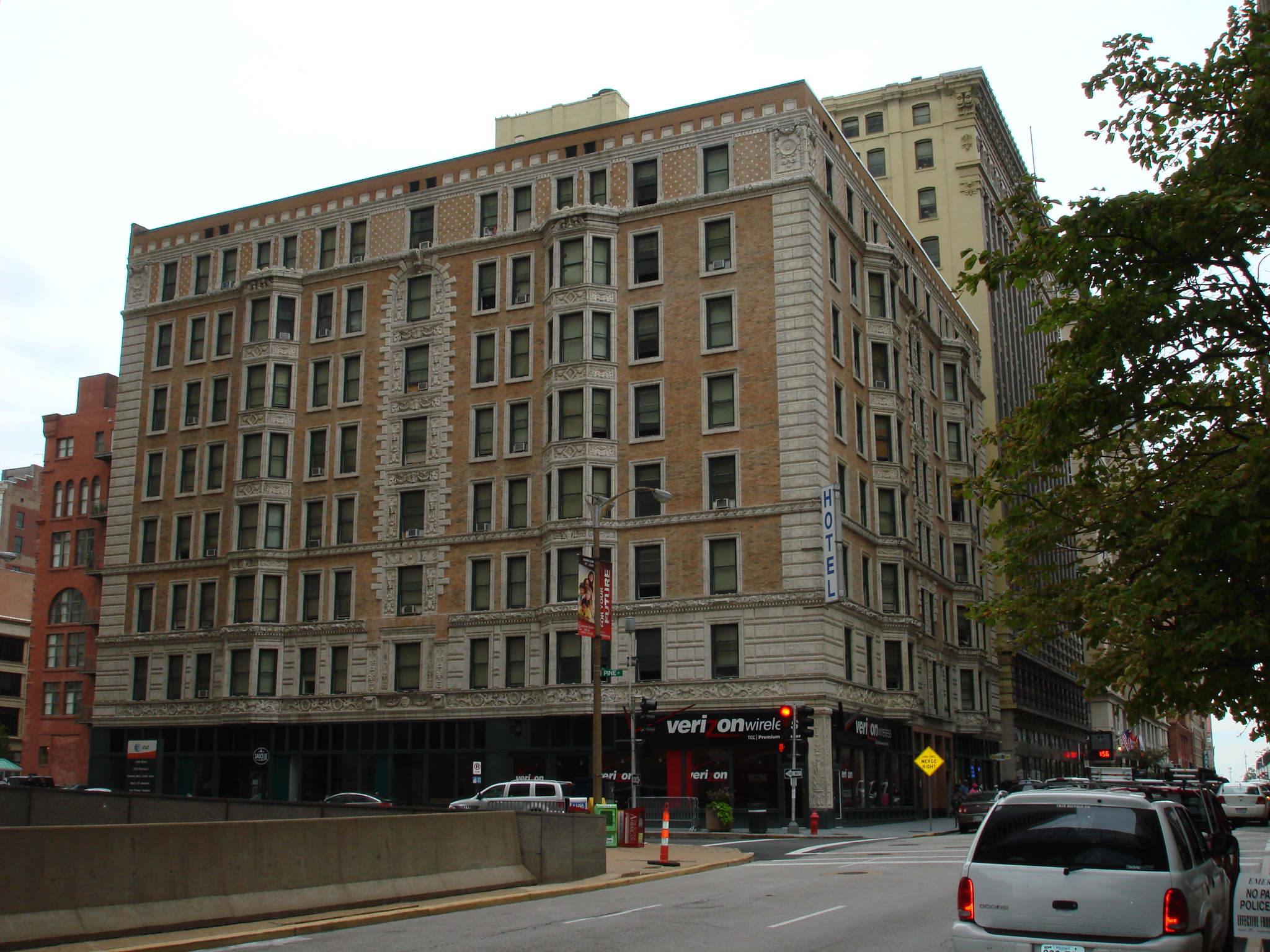

- Location within St. Louis Location within Missouri Location within the United States
- Location: 205 N. Ninth St., St. Louis, Missouri
- Coordinates: 38°37′42″N 90°11′37″W
- Area: less than one acre
- Built: 1907
- Architect: Groves, Albert B.
- Architectural style: Classical Revival
- NRHP reference No.: 96000044
- Added to NRHP: February 16, 1996

The Maryland Hotel, now known as the Mark Twain Hotel, is a historic hotel in downtown St. Louis, Missouri. The hotel was built in 1907 and designed by St. Louis architect Albert B. Groves. The Classical Revival building uses terra cotta decorations extensively; in particular, the second story is covered entirely in terra cotta, and other decorative terra cotta panels feature fruit and flowers.

The Maryland Hotel opened as a luxury hotel, but it eventually became a flophouse. In the 1990s, the hotel was renovated and became the Mark Twain Hotel; the new hotel serves low-income people, particularly those with criminal records.

The hotel was added to the National Register of Historic Places on February 16, 1996. At the time of its listing, it was one of only seven historic hotels in downtown St. Louis; five of the others (Hotel Statler, Lennox Hotel, Majestic Hotel, Mayfair Hotel, and Union Station Terminal Hotel) were previously listed on the National Register, and the last, Hotel Jefferson, was added in 2003.
