= Advertising Building =

Historic building in Missouri, United States

- U.S. National Register of Historic Places
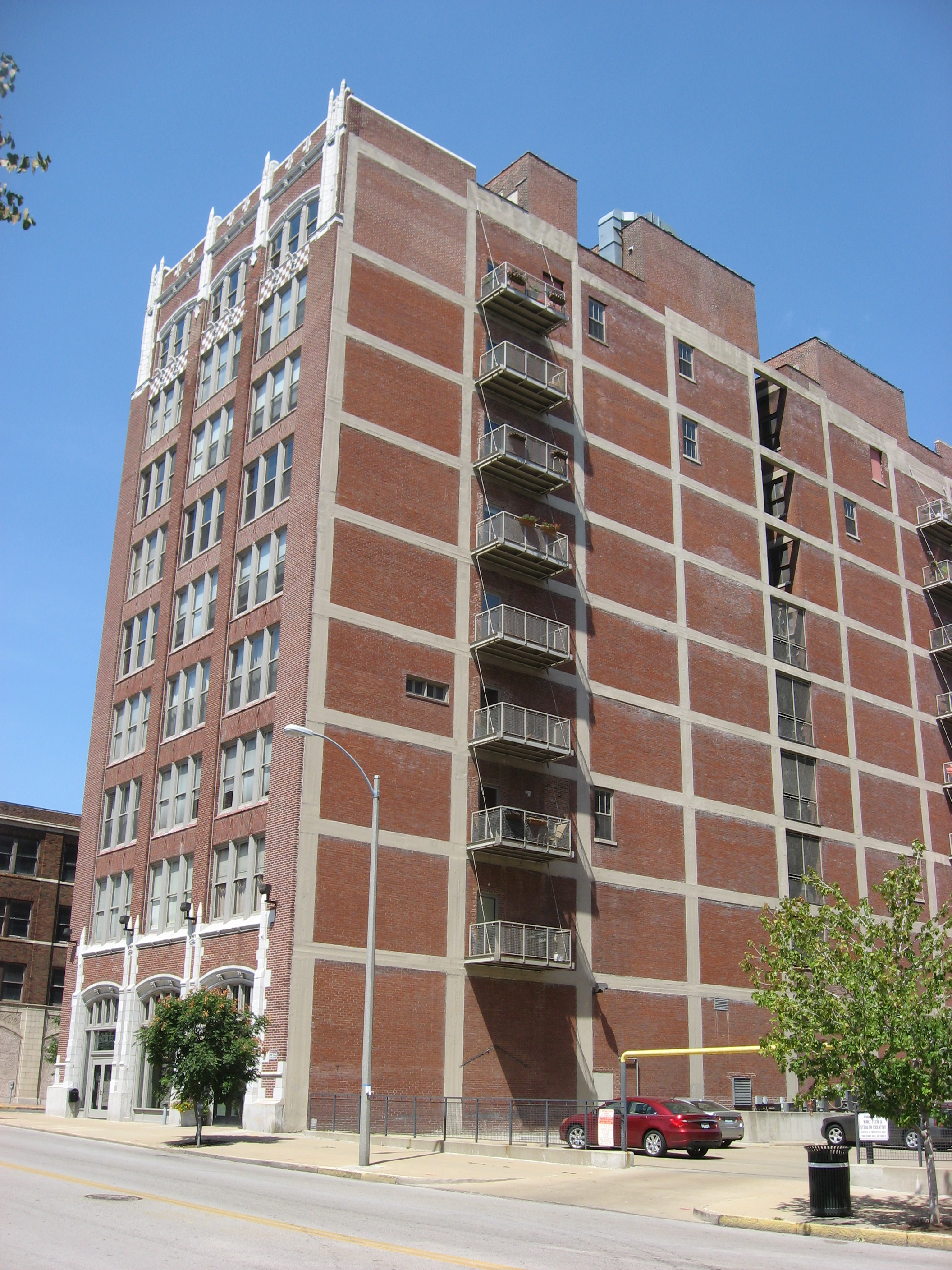

- Location within St. Louis Location within Missouri Location within the United States
- Location: 1627-1629 Locust St., St. Louis, Missouri
- Coordinates: 38°37′55″N 90°12′14″W
- Area: less than one acre
- Built: 1917
- Architects: Groves,Albert B.
- Architectural style: Late Gothic Revival
- NRHP reference No.: 85000106
- Added to NRHP: January 18, 1985

The Advertising Building is a structure at 1627–1629 Locust Street in Downtown St. Louis, Missouri, United States. Designed by Albert B. Groves, the building rises nine stories, with a brick facade and terracotta trim, and has exterior decorations designed in the Gothic style. It was built in 1917 as a commercial structure. In the 21st century, the building was redeveloped into condominiums and renamed the Printers Lofts. It is on the National Register of Historic Places.

== Description ==
The Advertising Building is located at 1627–1629 Locust Street in Downtown St. Louis, Missouri, United States, at the northeast corner with 17th Street, extending back to St. Charles Street. It was designed by Albert B. Groves, a prolific designer of industrial buildings in St. Louis. The building measures 55 by 155 feet (17 by 47 m) across and rises nine stories, with a brick facade and terracotta trim. The exterior decorations are designed in the Gothic style.

The building is subdivided vertically into three bays each along Locust Street to the south and St. Charles Street to the north and eight bays along 17th Street to the west. On the Locust and St. Charles Street elevations, the facade has elliptical bays with terracotta trim at ground story, flanked by gray-white buttresses made of terracotta. Above the ground story, vertical brick piers rise to the top story, separating triple windows on each of the second through eighth floors; the spandrel panels between different floors have brick lozenge patterns. The top story has terracotta decorations with pinnacles above the piers, as well as parapets with crenellations. On the 17th Street elevation, the ground story has similar terracotta trim to the Locust and St. Charles elevations. There are quadruple windows in the six center bays and small triple windows in the two outer bays. On the eastern elevation, there are few windows; this elevation has a lightwell with a fire escape.

The interior is composed of concrete floor slabs supported by 14 pillars with conical capitals. These spaces contained 44 residential condominiums by the early 21st century, part of an 82-condominium development that extended into a neighboring building. The condominiums vary in size from 663 to 2,628 square feet (61.6 to 244.1 m^{2}).

== History ==
The Advertising Building was built by the Seventeenth Street Realty Company, led by George Warren Brown, as part of a development boom in Downtown West, St. Louis. By the 1910s, when the building was contemplated, Locust Street was projected to become a large wholesaling hub, and residential development on 17th Street was being replaced with commercial structures. The building was designed in 1917, and tenants such as the Fisher-Ruebel-Brown Advertising Co., Rapid Engraving Co., Garrison-Wagner Printing and Drygoodsman Publishing Co. began moving into to the building in February 1918. By the next month, the building's manager had leased out seven floors. Many of the building's first tenants were associated with advertising agencies. At the time of the structure's development, advertising was a rapidly growing industry in St. Louis.

Brown died in 1922. Light manufacturing firms began relocating out of St. Louis in the 1930s and the intersection of 17th and Locust streets lost importance as a mercantile building. After Brown's widow died in 1934, the Seventeenth Street Realty Company transferred ownership of the building to Washington University in St. Louis in 1936. The building became known as the Mary Muffet Building, after a clothing factory located there. By the mid-20th century, the building's tenants included the General Tire and Rubber Company and Western Electric. A sewing-machine firm, printers and a garment workers' union also moved into the building.

In 1985, the building was listed on the National Register of Historic Places. Developer Craig Heller redeveloped the Mary Muffet Building in the 2000s as the Printers Lofts development, which also encompassed the neighboring Blackwell Printing Company building. He hired Andy Trivers as restoration architect and obtained $27 million to redevelop the structures. The development was named for the printers formerly present in the Blackwell building.

== See also ==
- National Register of Historic Places listings in Downtown and Downtown West St. Louis
