= Brown Shoe Company's Homes-Take Factory =

- U.S. National Register of Historic Places
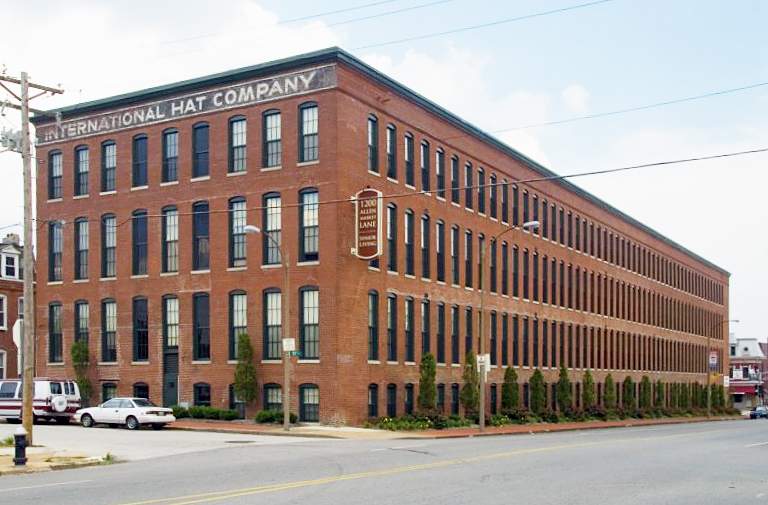
- Brown Shoe Company Factory (1904-1930s) and International Hat Company Warehouse (1954-1976). Since 1980, the building operates as a senior and disabled living facility.

- Location within St. Louis Location within Missouri Location within the United States
- Location: 1201 Russell Boulevard; St. Louis, Missouri
- Coordinates: 38°36′29″N 90°12′36″W
- Built: 1904
- Architect: Albert B. Groves
- NRHP reference No.: 80004503
- Designated NRHP: October 20, 1980

Brown Shoe Company's Homes-Take Factory, also known as the International Hat Company Warehouse, is a historic building location at 1201 Russell Boulevard in the Soulard neighborhood of St. Louis, Missouri. Built in 1904, by renowned architect Albert B. Groves, the building was originally a factory for the Brown Shoe Company, based in St. Louis. In 1954, the factory was subsequently converted into a warehouse by the International Hat Company. The site has been recognized as a testament to Grove's architectural expertise in the principles of factory design, namely technical advances in layout planning, operational efficiency, and employee safety. Additionally, the factory epitomizes the early 20th century cultural transformation and socio-industrial development of St. Louis into a manufacturing powerhouse. In particular, the Brown Shoe Company is recognized as a principal player in challenging the 19th century dominance of the New England shoe industry. This significantly contributed to the early 20th century sobriquet of St. Louis as the city of "shoes, booze, and blues." The Brown Shoe Company's Homes-Take factory is considered to be among the pioneering industrial facilities of this historic transformation.

== History ==
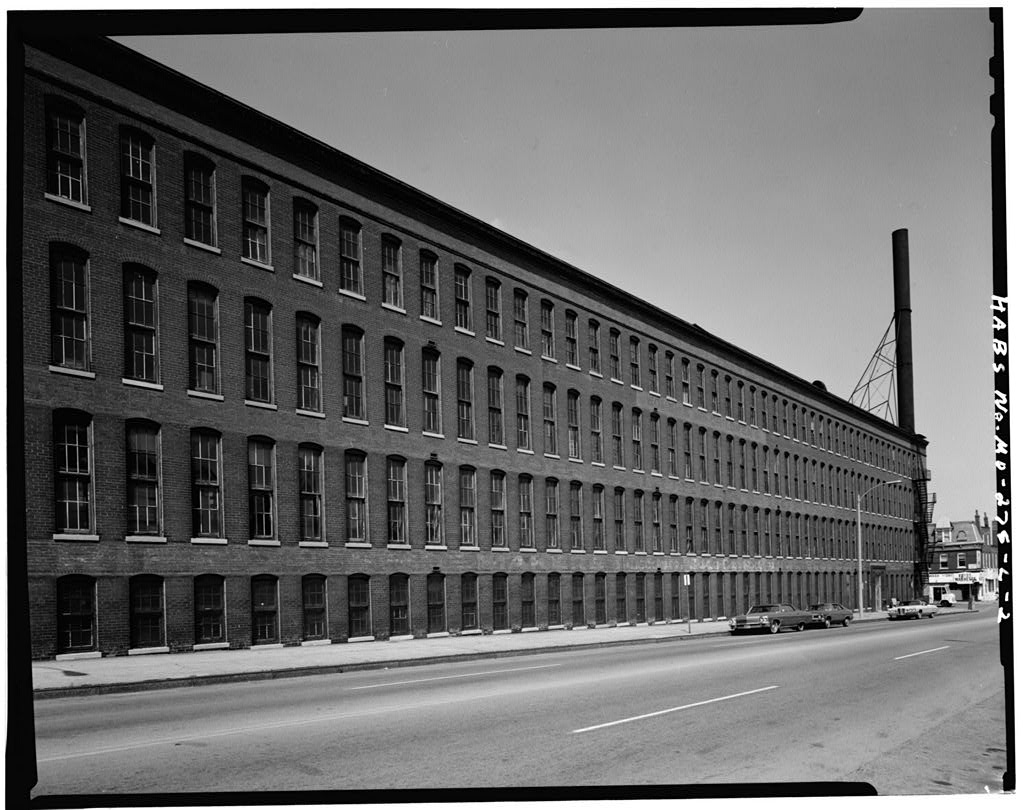
International Hat Company Warehouse in 1964.

The Homes-Take factory was designed and constructed in 1904 by the noted St. Louis architect Albert B. Groves (1866-1925). The Brown Shoe Company paid $66,000 for the construction project, which with inflation would cost over $1,700,000 in 2015. Groves designed and built eighteen churches in St. Louis, as well as a myriad of commercial, residential, and industrial buildings. In particular, Groves developed eleven factories for the Brown Shoe Company. The Homes-Take factory began production with a medium-priced line of women's dress shoes.

During the Great Depression, the factory was permanently mothballed. In 1954, the property was bought by the International Hat Company, which converted the factory into a warehouse. The Mexican Hat factory purchased a separate part of the building and converted the section into office space. The International Hat warehouse operated until 1976. That same year, the entire building was sold to the Junior Achievement of the Mississippi Valley. In 1978, the building was bought by Allen Market Lane Apartments. According to historian M. M. Constanin, the area at the time appeared as a sort of "Brechtian gloom," insofar as the abandoned building and street created a sense of alienation and detachment from the once vibrant and purposeful area.

On October 20, 1980, the building was formally added to the National Register of Historic Places after being petitioned by Allen Market Lane Apartments. Since 1980, the property has operated as a senior and disabled living center, with 100 units. The apartment complex was thoroughly renovated in 2005.

== Architecture ==
The Homes-Take factory was originally designed to be a four-story, rectangular red brick building, measuring sixty by three hundred feet. The building occupies approximately one half of a city block. A dominant feature of the architectural design is the closely spaced windows, ten feet by three-and-a-half feet. As part of the restoration of the building, Allen Market Lane Apartments installed historically-correct, single hung Quaker windows. In 2005, the windows were custom designed to preserve the original aesthetic quality and structural integrity of the original 1904 glass work. Preserving the windows was a necessary element of the process of obtaining and maintaining government approval of the building onto the National Register of Historic Places.

== See also ==
- Albert B. Groves
- Brown Shoe Co.
- Brown Shoe Company Factory
- National Register of Historic Places listings in St. Louis south and west of downtown

== Bibliography ==
- Constanin, M. M. (1978). Sidestreets St. Louis. Pennsylvania State University: Sidestreets Press.
- Fox, Tim (1995). Where We Live: A Guide to St. Louis Communities. St. Louis, MO: Missouri Historical Society Pr. ISBN 188398212X.
- Gratz, Roberta Brandes; Mintz, Norman (2000). Cities Back from the Edge: New Life for Downtown. Hoboken, NJ: John Wiley & Sons. ISBN 9780471361244.
- Heitz, Jesse (2016). Fire Resistance in American Heavy Timber Construction: History and Preservation. New York, NY: Springer Publishing. ISBN 9783319321288.
