= Locust Street Automotive District =

Historic district in St. Louis, Missouri

- U.S. National Register of Historic Places
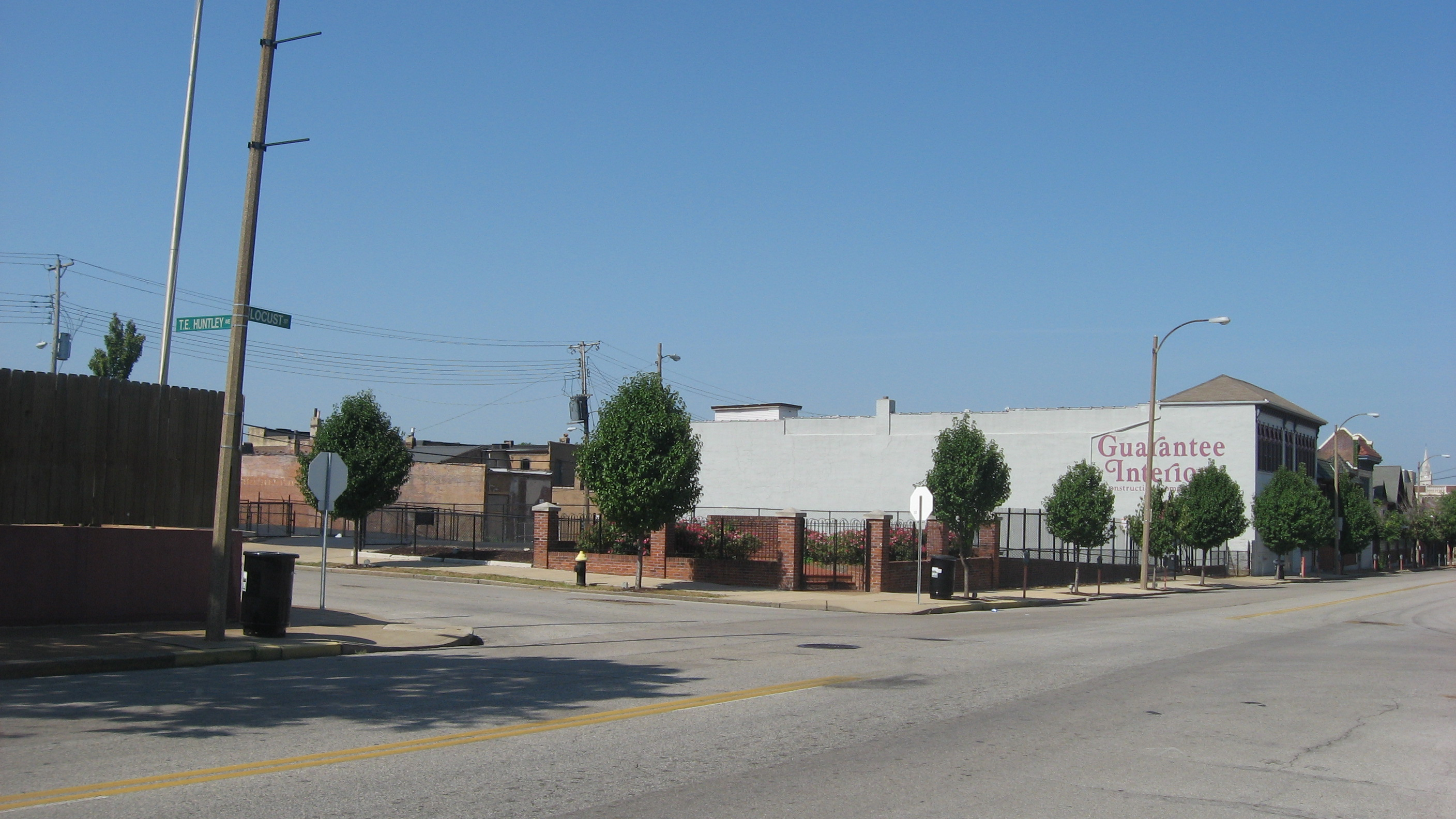

- Location within Missouri
- Location: 2914-3124 Locust and 3043 Olive, St. Louis, Missouri
- Coordinates: 38°38′15″N 90°13′21″W
- Area: 11 acres (4.5 ha) (original); 3 acres (1.2 ha) (increase I)
- Built: 1911
- Architect: Preston J. Bradshaw, Albert B. Groves, others
- Architectural style: Renaissance, Beaux Arts, others
- MPS: Historic Auto-Related Resources of St. Louis, Missouri MPS
- NRHP reference No.: 05001024 (original); 08000032 (increase 1); 16000581 (increase 2)

Significant dates
- Added to NRHP: September 15, 2005
- Boundary increases: February 19, 2008; 2016

The Locust Street Automotive District in St. Louis, Missouri is a historic district which was listed on the National Register of Historic Places in 2005 and expanded twice, in 2008 and 2016.

The original area included 26 contributing buildings on 11 acres (4.5 ha), at 2914-3124 Locust and 3043 Olive. The first increase extended the district to the west, adding nine contributing buildings on 3 acres (1.2 ha) at 3133-3207 and 3150-3202 Locust St. The second increase extended the district to the east, adding 2722-2900 Locust St. and 2727-2801 Locust St.

The district includes works by Preston J. Bradshaw and by Albert B. Groves.

== See also ==
- Locust Street Historic District, in Washington, Missouri in Franklin County
