= The Hotel Majestic St. Louis =

- U.S. National Register of Historic Places
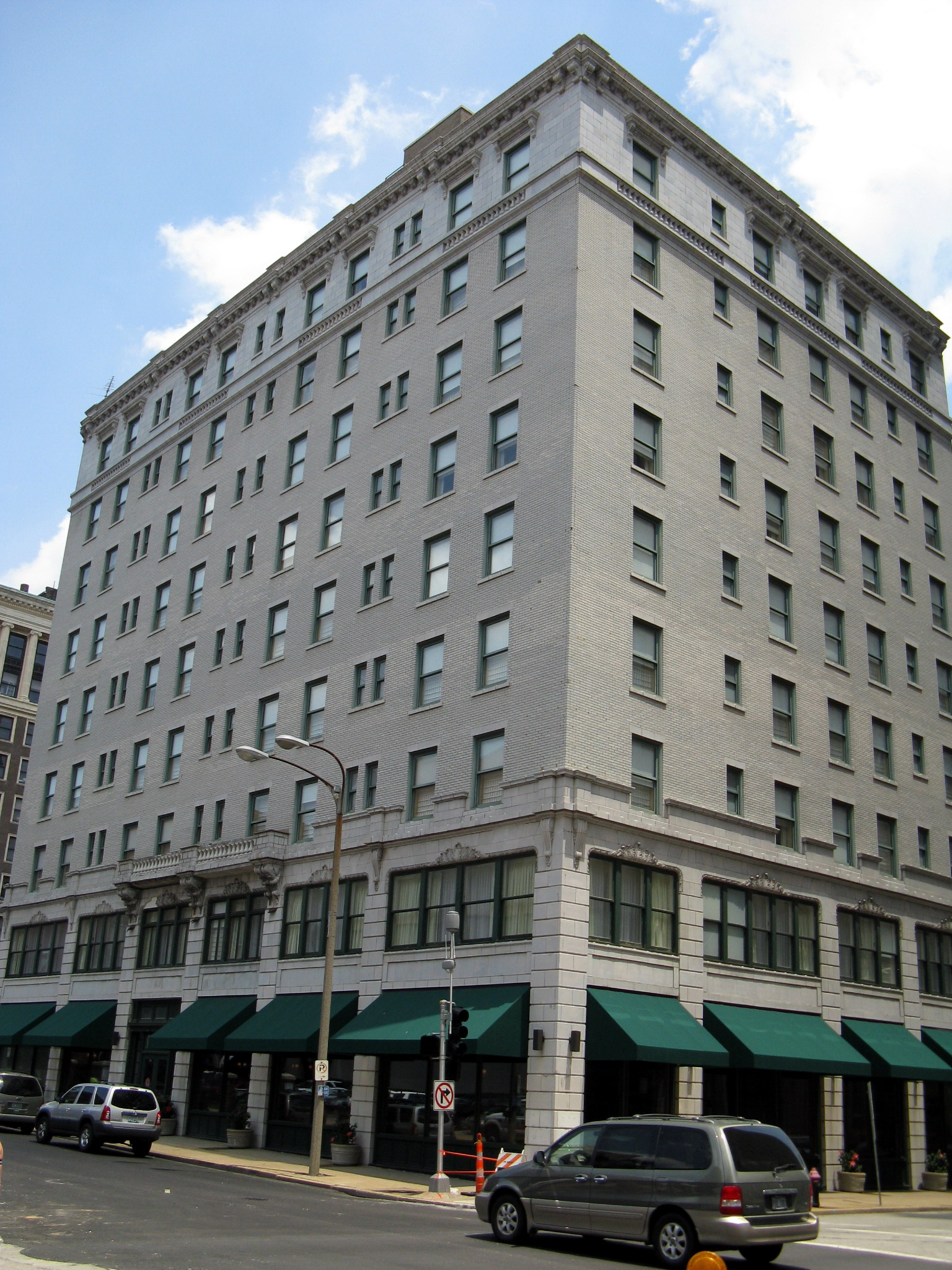
- Building in June of 2008.

- Location within St. Louis Location within Missouri Location within the United States
- Location: 1017-23 Pine St. and 200-10 N. 11th St., St. Louis, Missouri, United States
- Coordinates: 38°37′43″N 90°11′45″W
- Built: 1913–1914
- Architect: Harry F. Roach and Albert B. Groves
- Architectural style: Renaissance
- NRHP reference No.: 84002653
- Added to NRHP: January 26, 1984

Le Méridien St. Louis Downtown is a restored historic hotel in St. Louis, Missouri, United States built in 1913–1914 as the Majestic Hotel. It was listed on the National Register of Historic Places in 1984.

The Majestic Hotel has 72,000 square feet (6,700 m^{2}) of space, nine stories and 109 feet (33 m) tall at its maximum height, and is based on a steel frame. It also has brick curtain walls and concrete floors. The hotel was designed as a tri-part structure, including a base, shaft, and capital, and is divided by the use of white terracotta.

== History ==
In 1913, construction for the hotel began, replacing a three-story building. The hotel cost about $250,000 to build. However, it is unclear who designed the hotel. Plans for the hotel give credit to Harry F. Roach, while building permits list the architect as Albert B. Groves. Both men were well-known St. Louis architects who had each designed various other hotels, but were never in partnership.

The Majestic Hotel opened in September, 1914. The building's Renaissance Revival design was a common style in 1920s St. Louis architecture. The hotel was built to serve middle-class guests, and had advanced fireproofing, two restaurants, and a rathskeller.

The Majestic Hotel was later renamed the DeSoto Hotel and operated until 1979, when it was announced that the building would be replaced with a parking garage, due to the high cost needed to restore the building to meet modern building codes. The hotel was eventually given to new owners, who planned to renovate it into office space.

However, a joint venture by Majestic Associates, made up of Eugene Wolff, Dick Deutsch, and Southwestern Bell, restore the building into a luxury hotel at a cost of $7 million, and returned it to its original name, Hotel Majestic. Southwestern Bell also spent $15 million in 1987 to renovate the building. Robert G. Pope of Southwestern Bell was in charge of this renovation.

In 1996, the hotel was sold for $4.3 million to Bray & Gillespie LLC, which operated it under the Crowne Plaza brand as the Crowne Plaza Majestic. In 1997, Omni Hotels & Resorts acquired the hotel and rebranded it the Omni Majestic Hotel.

In 2016, Omni sold it to Iowa-based Hawkeye Hotels. Hawkeye renovated the hotel in 2018 and 2019, and will planned to reopen it under Marriott's Le Méridien brand in August 2020 as Le Méridien St. Louis Downtown. The reopenign was delayed by the COVID-19 pandemic, and the hotel finally reopened on May 5, 2022.
