= Lucas Avenue Industrial Historic District =

Historic district in Missouri, United States

- U.S. National Register of Historic Places
- U.S. Historic district
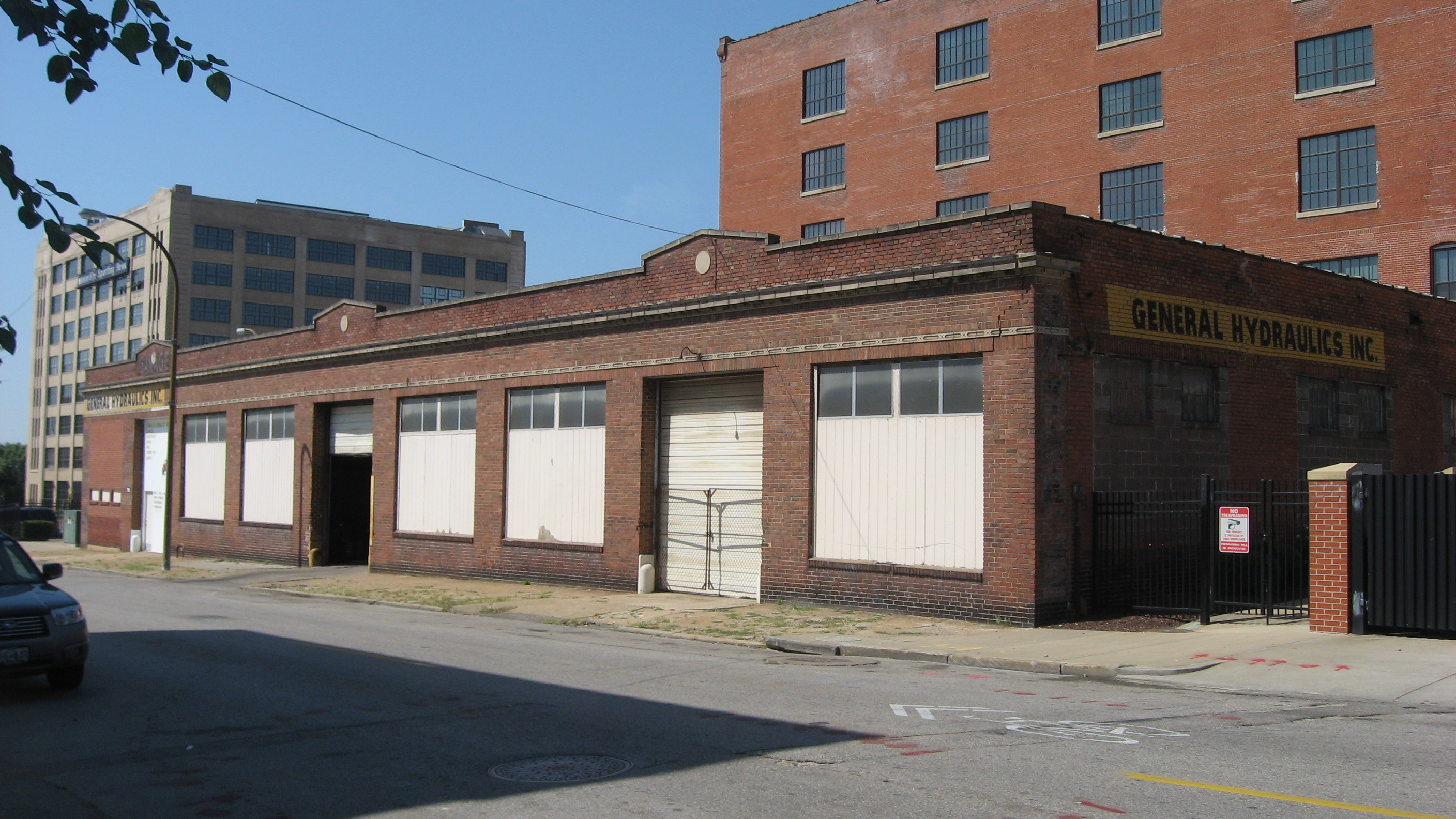
- Front of the small hydraulics company building at 701 N. Twentieth Street in St. Louis, Missouri, United States. Built in 1923, it is part of the Lucas Avenue Industrial Historic District, a historic district that is listed on the National Register of Historic Places.

- Location within St. Louis Location within Missouri Location within the United States
- Location: Bounded by Washington, Delmar, 20th & 21 Sts., St. Louis, Missouri (original), roughly bounded by Locust St., Delmar, and 19th and 20th Sts., St. Louis, Missouri (boundary increase)
- Coordinates: 38°38′12″N 90°12′30″W
- Architect: Groves, Albert B. (original); Conzelman, Russell A. (boundary increase); et al.
- NRHP reference No.: 00001009 (original), 07000349 (boundary increase)
- Added to NRHP: August 31, 2000 (original), April 24, 2007 (boundary increase)

Lucas Avenue Industrial Historic District is an American historic district bounded by Washington, Delmar, 20th & 21 Streets, St. Louis, Missouri. It was added to the National Register of Historic Places in 2000. A boundary increase, roughly bounded by Locust St., Delmar, and 19th and 20th Sts. was added in 2007. Included in the boundary increase are a warehouse, a manufacturing facility and a communications facility.
