= Hamilton-Brown Shoe Company Building =

- U.S. National Register of Historic Places
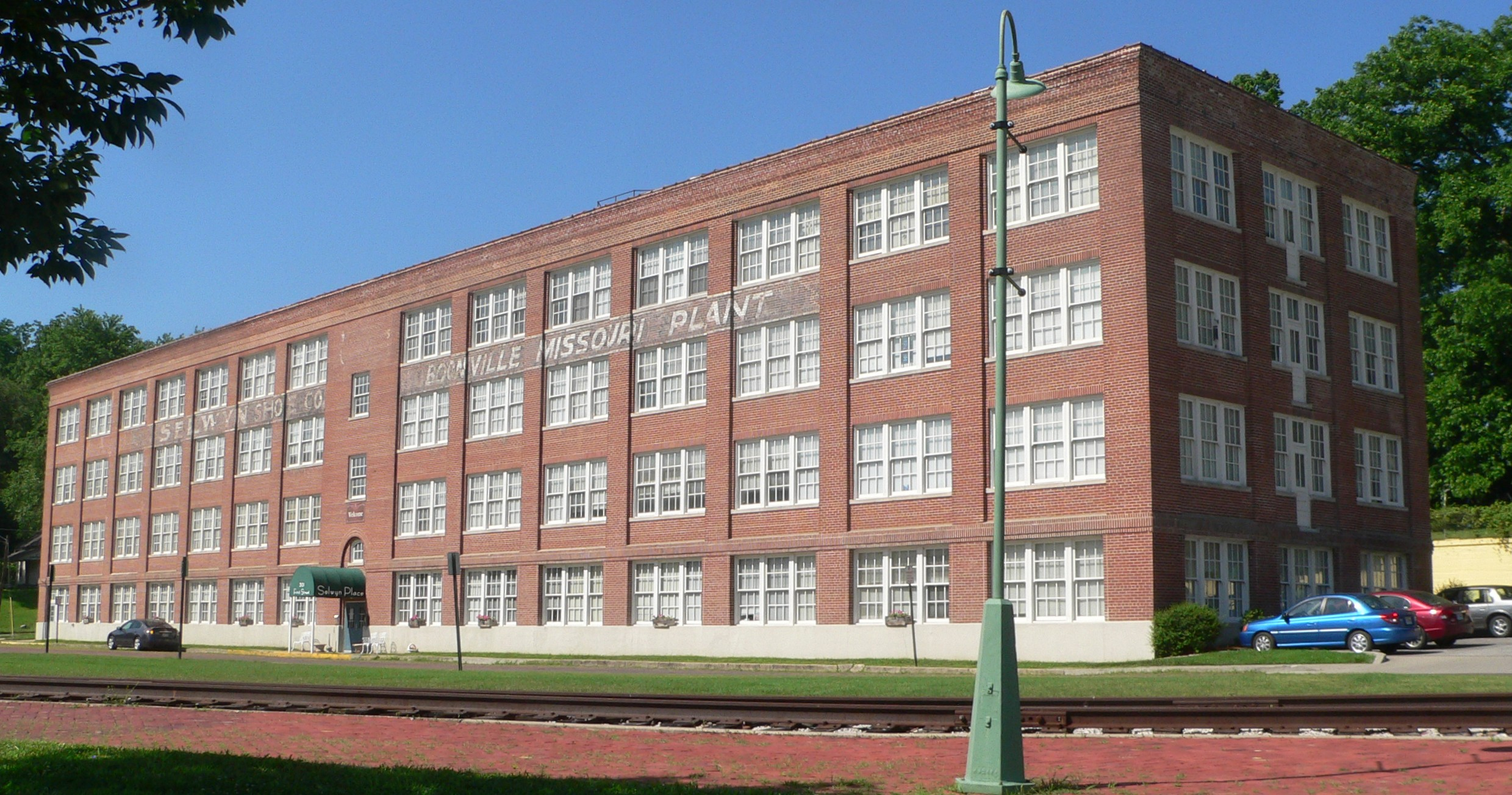
- Hamilton-Brown Shoe Company Building, June 2015

- Location within Missouri Location within the United States
- Location: First St., Boonville, Missouri
- Coordinates: 38°58′29″N 92°45′0″W
- Area: less than one acre
- Architectural style: Early 20th Cen. Industrial
- MPS: Boonville Missouri MRA
- NRHP reference No.: 82005305
- Added to NRHP: March 16, 1990

Hamilton-Brown Shoe Company Building, now the Selwyn Place Apartments, is a historic factory building located at Boonville, Cooper County, Missouri. It was built in 1919 by the Hamilton-Brown Shoe Company, and is a four-story, rectangular brick industrial building with a flat roof. The roof is framed by a corbelled parapet capped with tile coping. The building features a five-story elevator tower and four-story tower which housed restrooms. Also on the property are the contributing power plant building and oil house.

It was listed on the National Register of Historic Places in 1990.

== See also ==
- Hamilton-Brown Shoe Factory (Columbia, Missouri)
- Hamilton-Brown Shoe Factory (St. Louis, Missouri)
