= Famous Footwear =

American footwear retail chain

- Company type: Subsidiary
- Industry: Retail
- Founded: June 1960; 66 years ago (as Neil's Factory Shoe Outlet); Madison, Wisconsin, U.S.
- Founder: Neil Moldenhauer
- Headquarters: St. Louis, Missouri, U.S.
- Number of locations: 1,055 (June 2022)
- Products: Footwear
- Revenue: ▲US$1.2 billion (2021)
- Number of employees: 7,000 (2021)
- Parent: Caleres (1980–present)
- Website: famousfootwear.com

Famous Footwear is a nationwide chain of retail stores in the United States dealing in branded footwear, generally at prices discounted from manufacturer's suggested prices. The chain is a division of the St. Louis–based Caleres and had more than 1,125 stores in 2010.

== Company history ==
=== Formation ===
Famous Footwear began in 1960 with the establishment of a single shoe store, Neil's Factory Shoe Outlet (launched as "Neil's Shoes"), in Madison, Wisconsin. The store was launched by 29-year-old Neil Moldenhauer and was financed by a $10,000 loan.

In 1963, Neil's Factory Shoe Outlet hired a college student named Brian Cook as a stock boy, a man who later rose up the company ladder to become president of Famous Footwear in 1979. Nearly half a century later Cook recalled:

"We were one of the first factory outlets in the Midwest.... The store bought all closeouts and was primarily a women's store. The market had never seen anything like that... Most of the stores that shoppers went to were mom-and-pop stores, department stores were all very expensive, not at all like they are today. The market was wide open for big, open formats selling discount product. As a result, we started a rapid store expansion program. We ended up putting a lot of little stores out of business....

"Eventually, in the early 1990s, everybody was a discunter. Everyone was opening shoe stores like ours. Everyone copied our concept. We were groundbreaking and very revolutionary at the time, and not very popular with a lot of regular-priced retailers.

The name "Famous Footwear" was launched in 1964 when Moldenhauer opened a second store in Cedar Rapids, Iowa. By the end of the 1960s, eight Famous Footwear and Neil's Factory Shoe Outlet stores were in operation, with combined annual revenues approaching $1 million.

=== Expansion ===
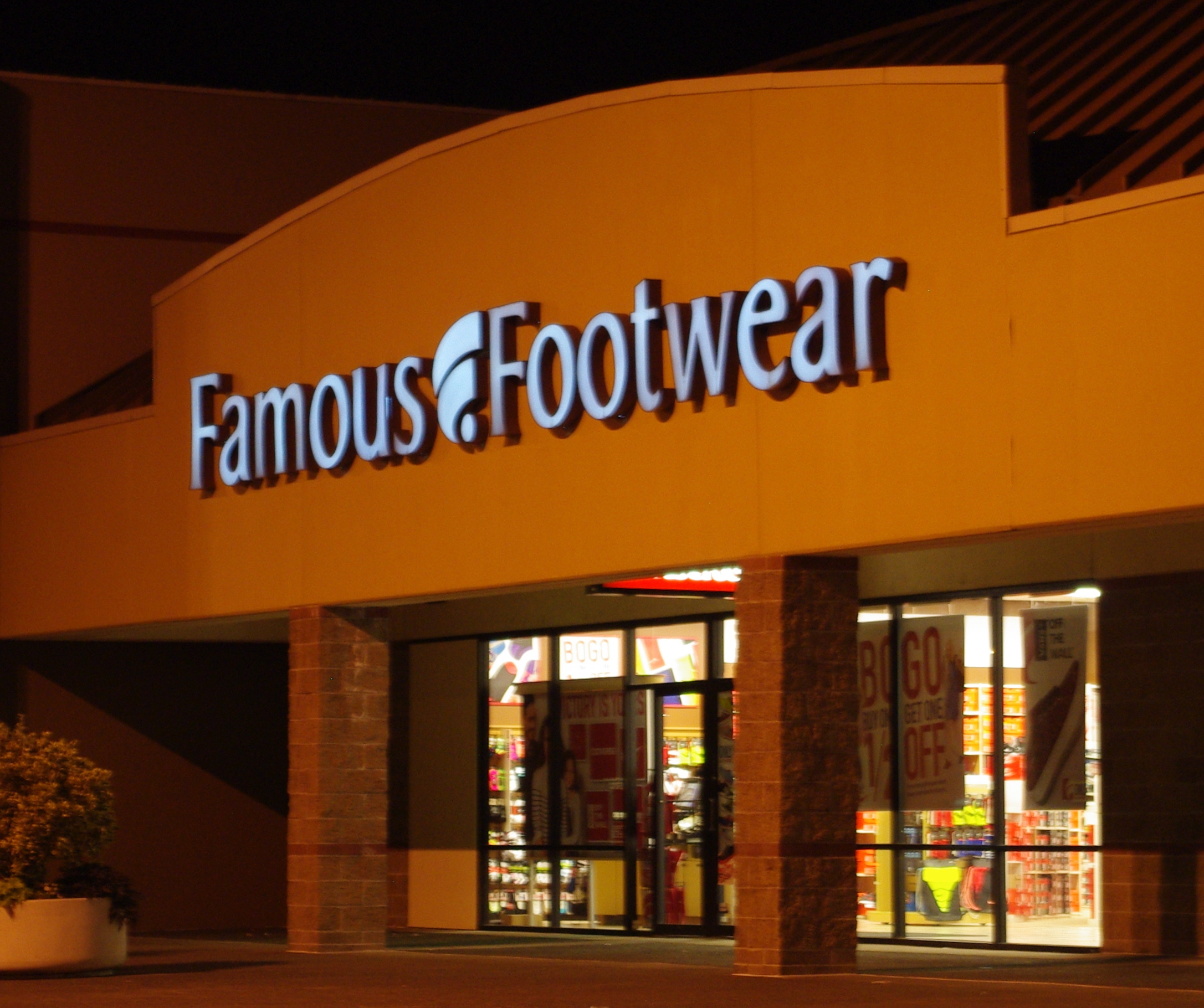
A store in Hillsboro, Oregon

By 1974, all stores in the chain—which then consisted of 15 stores—were unified under the Famous Footwear banner. Ninety percent of the chain was purchased from Moldenhauer that year by a leveraged buyout led by longtime employees Dave Orfan and Brian Cook, along with a group of outside investors. Orfan initially assumed the role of president with Cook as executive vice president, a relationship which changed in 1979 when Cook assumed the presidency. The company became an attractive investment opportunity for the St. Louis–based Brown Shoe Company, which acquired the firm and immediately set about planning for rapid expansion. By 1986, the chain consisted of 230 stores.

In 1990, Famous Footwear opened a 740,000-square-foot (69,000 m^{2}) distribution center in Sun Prairie, Wisconsin, near Madison. This was followed by another 800,000-square-foot (74,000 m^{2}) distribution center in Lebanon, Tennessee, constructed in 1993. Fueled by Brown Shoe Co. money, the chain had expanded to 722 stores in 44 states by the end of that year.

Before 1974, because of its discounting policy, Famous Footwear was unable to purchase footwear from the two leading athletic shoe giants of the day, Adidas and Puma. Consumer demand for this emerging product category was enormous. In response, Famous Footwear opened up a number of little sporting goods shops called All Star Sports Centers, facilities which were directly promoted by regular Famous stores.

The move accelerated the growth of the Famous Footwear chain again, albeit the company's typical business model, which was historically based upon the long margins possible through bulk buying of discontinued products. In the ensuing decades, Famous gradually moved to a more traditional mark-up structure based upon the bulk purchase of current goods, while remaining a leading distributor of closeout branded merchandise.

=== Company today ===
In October 2010, Famous Footwear consisted of 1,126 retail stores in the United States, including 947 Famous Footwear stores and 179 thematically structured outlet stores. Some 26 new stores were launched or were planned to open in 2010. The company indicated a long-term desire to add another 400 to 500 stores. The company indicated that it had plans to close 126 underperforming stores by the end of 2012, approximately matched by planned openings of additional new locations.

Famous opened five athletic driven stores named "Mind Body Sole" intending to show manufacturers like Nike, Reebok, Brooks, Asics, Adidas and Mizuno that it had the capability to sell these items through commitment to training and customer service. Once these small sales stores were unable to move certain high dollar items, the company would be able to move them into the outlet stores under the assumption of them being clear outs being shifted into the outlets. What happened, though, was that these items were moved into the outlets and the price was placed at or near retail price, regardless of age or the business trend of the price of such items.

In 2010, Famous claimed to be dealing with some 800 brands as a company. In that year about 18 percent of the chain's business involved the brands of Famous' parent corporation, Brown Shoe Company (in May 2015 named Caleres), which include Naturalizer, Dr. Scholl's, Franco Sarto, Sam Edelman and the chain's private label, Connie.

In November 2010, Famous Footwear planned to launch a new five-store test of an outlet concept called "Mind Body Soul", concentrating on footwear related to the toning and fitness category. Test stores would average 2,000 square feet (190 m^{2}) and would initially be launched in Denver, Tulsa, Orlando and Palm Beach, Florida, and Burlington, Massachusetts.
