= Caleres =

American footwear company

Caleres Inc.
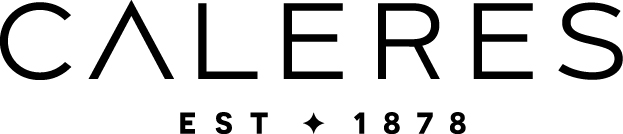
- Formerly: Brown Shoe Company (1893–2015)
- Type: Public
- Traded as: NYSE: CAL
- Industry: Retail, wholesale
- Founded: 1878; 148 years ago
- Headquarters: Clayton, Missouri, U.S.
- Number of locations: 1,369 (January 2011)
- Key people: Jay Schmidt (CEO)
- Products: Footwear
- Revenue: $2.968 billion (2022)
- Number of employees: 13,400
- Website: caleres.com

Caleres Inc. is an American footwear company that owns and operates a variety of footwear brands. Its headquarters is located in Clayton, Missouri, a suburb of St. Louis. The company was founded in 1878 as Bryan, Brown & Company in St. Louis, though it underwent several name changes. The Hamilton-Brown Shoe Company was the largest manufacturer of shoes in America in the early 20th century, but it went bankrupt in June 1939.

In the 1970s, Brown operated Famous Footwear, Cloth World fabric stores, Bottom Half jeans stores, and Meis department stores. Brown Shoe changed its name to Caleres on May 27, 2015, and current brands include Famous Footwear, Sam Edelman, Stuart Weitzman, Allen Edmonds, Naturalizer, and Vionic.

== History ==
=== 1878–1900: Origins ===
Previous logo

The company was created in St. Louis and was originally named Bryan, Brown & Company, after its founders George Warren Brown and Alvin Bryan. The company began business in 1878 and incorporated in 1881 as the Bryan-Brown Shoe Company.

George Warren Brown had moved from New York to St. Louis in 1873 to work in his older brother's shoe business, and he saw potential for shoe manufacturing in St. Louis. At that point, most shoes were manufactured in New England. After four years in his brother's wholesale shoe business, Brown had the funds to found Bryan, Brown & Company to make women's shoes, with Alvin L. Bryan and Jerome Desnoyers also as investors. The company hired five skilled shoemakers from Rochester, New York, to start the factory in St. Louis, and it grew quickly. In 1878, it had sales of $110,000.

In 1881, it was incorporated as the Bryan-Brown Shoe Company. In 1886, the company became the Brown-Desnoyers Shoe Company, after Mr. Bryan retired. In 1893, Mr. J.B. Desnoyers also retired, and the name was changed to the Brown Shoe Company. In 1895, the Brown Shoe Company's factory had about six hundred employees, who could make five thousand pairs of shoes and boots per day. The company competed well, since Brown shoes were sold throughout the Midwest at prices lower than New England shoes. By 1900, the company was growing at a rate of $1 million a year. Four years later, the company bought the rights to Buster Brown, a character developed by cartoonist Richard F. Outcault, which they would use for marketing.

=== 1901–1920s: Growth and labor issues ===
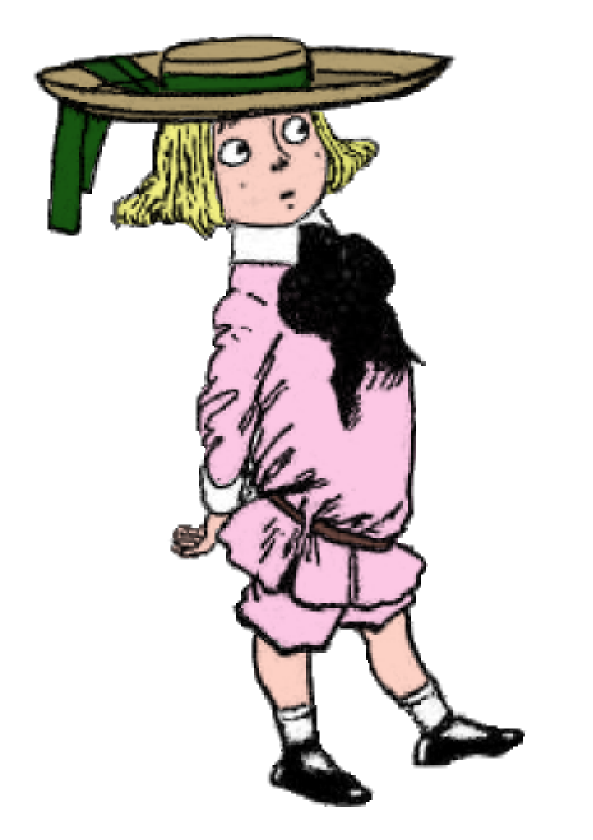
Buster Brown, who became the company's mascot in 1904

As Brown Shoes grew, St. Louis became increasingly known as a center for shoe manufacturing, and competing factories set up in the city.

In 1904, a deadly elevator accident occurred at a Brown Shoe factory in St. Louis. It happened on January 13 when a crowd of employees were waiting for the elevator at the factory and someone raised the elevator gate, causing 10 people to fall down the shaft. At least 8 people were killed and the other 2 were described as "fatally injured." It's unclear if they succumbed to their injuries.

By 1902, Brown Shoe had five factories operating in St. Louis, and in 1907, the company set up its first plant out of the city, where labor was cheaper in Moberly, Missouri. In 1907, the company moved its headquarters to a building in downtown St. Louis. During this time of high competition, Brown Shoes kept profits high by keeping labor costs as low as possible, as the cost of plant equipment and materials were somewhat fixed. As the work became more mechanized, shoe factory jobs required less skill, and in the industry at large, positions were increasingly filled by women and children, who could be paid less. In 1911, a survey of shoe workers in St. Louis found that over half were between the ages of 14 and 19, with an average wage for a girl under 16 less than $10 a week. In response to the poor working conditions at shoe factories in the St. Louis area, including Brown Shoes', workers formed unions; the moderate Boot and Shoe Workers Union was followed by the more radical United Shoe Workers of America. The latter was associated with the Industrial Workers of the World. Strikes led to anti-union activities among workers as well, and the creation of the anti-union propaganda organization Citizens Industrial Association in St. Louis. Partly in response to the union activity, Brown Shoe Company increasingly turned to labor in the small towns in the surrounding area. With management remaining in St. Louis, the company secured tax subsidies from various towns to open factories in rural Missouri and Illinois.

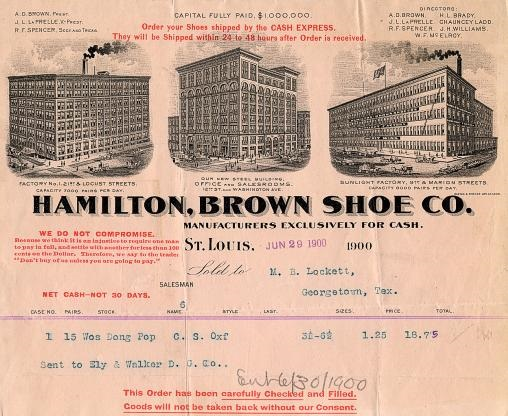
Brown Sho Company Advert, 1900s

Brown Shoe Company debuted on the New York Stock Exchange in 1913. Starting in 1917, the company secured lucrative military contracts with the United States government. The company encountered a crisis in 1920, when a rise in hemlines made many of Brown's high-topped shoes unfashionable and overstocked. The company had to go to Boston to secure credit from a bank, and the company then did well until the stock market crash of 1929.

=== 1930s: Great Depression and bankruptcy ===
During the Great Depression of the 1930s the company struggled to keep costs down, and workers' wages dropped, with a government investigation finding that workers at one plant were paid as little as "$2.50 and $3.00 for a 60-hour week." During this time the company also remained fiercely anti-union, even closing a plant in Vincennes, Indiana, in 1933 when the workers there held a strike for recognition. The company also reportedly used physical intimidation against union organizers, hiring a strike-breaking agency and infiltrating the unions themselves. The Illinois Federation of Labor forced a grand-jury investigation into Brown in 1935, after a union representative was almost tarred and feathered. There were no resultant indictments, although the Regional Labor Board in St. Louis did later issue a complaint, where they cited Brown for intimidation of employees using agents and officers, and unfair labor practices. The subsequent hearing revealed that John A. Bush had hired the A.A. Ahner detective agency in 1934, an agency known for strike-breaking. In 1936, Brown was cited by the National Labor Relations Board for violating the Wagner Act over the company dissolving the Salem local union, but Brown would not reinstate workers fired for union activity. The Fair Labor Standard Act of 1938 mandated that the remaining Brown workers receive higher wages.

The company went bankrupt in June 1939, after a failure to raise fresh capital for a reorganization. Stock of the company was suspended on the St. Louis Stock Exchange on June 23, 1939. The last transaction saw shares sold for 20 cents each, after a peak when its stock sold for up to $60 a share.

=== 1940s–1960s: Push into retail ===
Opening a plant in Dyer, Tennessee, in 1941, Brown began moving production toward the traditionally non-Union south. In the 1940s, Brown's third president, Clark Gamble, began pushing the company into retailing. Becoming president in 1948 after John Bush, Gamble in 1950 initiated a merger with Wohl Shoes, which wholesaled mostly women's shoes in 2,500 stores in North America and Cuba. In 1953, Brown acquired the large retail chain Regal Shoes, and in 1956 it acquired G. R. Kinney Corporation, then the largest operator of family shoe stores. At the time, Brown was the fourth-largest shoe manufacturer in the United States.

In 1959, a U.S. District Court in St. Louis deemed Brown guilty of anti-trust violations, and the company was ordered to sell Kinney. The ruling was upheld in 1962, at which point Brown was the number-one manufacturer in the shoe industry. Afterwards, Kinney was sold to F. W. Woolworth. For a time, the Hamilton-Brown Shoe Company was the largest manufacturer of shoes in America. In 1959, the company had acquired Perth Shoe Company in Canada, and in 1965, Brown bought the Samuels Shoe Company.

=== 1970s–1990s: Diversification as Brown Group ===
After doing well in the 1960s, in 1969 Brown's earnings dropped 25% after a 1968 flood of imports into the US shoe industry. W. L. Hadley Griffin became the company's president in 1969 and began diversifying into areas beyond shoes. In 1970 Brown acquired the importer Italia Bootwear, Ltd. After acquiring Eagle Rubber Company, Kent Sporting Goods, and other companies, in 1972 Brown changed its name to the Brown Group, Inc. It continued to acquire companies in children's products and sports and recreation. In the 1970s, Brown operated Famous Footwear, Cloth World fabric stores, Bottom Half jeans stores, and Meis department stores. In February 1979, it was reported that Brown Group, then the largest American producer of namebrand footwear, was petitioning for price relief from the federal government.

After closing its St. Louis warehouse in 1980, Brown began adjusting its business strategy to deal with pressure from cheap imports throughout the 1980s. In 1985 the company divested itself of its recreational products operations, leaving its focus largely on shoe retailing and manufacturing, with a quarter of operations in other stores. Around that time, Brown began to move away from manufacturing and toward shoe importing, acquiring Arnold Dunn, Inc., an importer, in 1984, and in 1986, the company acquired Pagoda Trading Company, an importing firm based in Asia. In 1988, Brown began to concentrate marketing on its well-known brands such as Connie, Naturalizer, and Buster Brown, while discontinuing its marginal lines. In 1989 the company sold all of its non-footwear retail operations except for the Cloth World chain.

In the early 1990s, Brown closed six of its domestic shoe plants, and in 1993 it began to close its Wohl Leased Shoe Department operation. In 1995, the last Brown Group-owned shoe factory in the United States closed, leaving the company with only two manufacturing plants in Canada. It sold three of its five headquarters buildings and its Cloth World chain. 35 percent of the overall workforce at Brown was fired, eliminating 8,500 jobs. Brown then acquired the Larry Stuart Collection and the Le Coq Sportif brand in 1995. The following year, Brown signed license agreements to market athletic footwear under the Russell and Penn brand names. After operating from 1972 until 1999 as the Brown Group, it became Brown Shoe again in 1999.

=== Since 2000: Name changes ===
As part of a restructuring, in 2002 the company closed 100 Naturalizer stores and remodeled 700 Famous Footwear outlets. The company had a loss of $4 million in 2001, and a $45.2 million profit in 2002. In the first half of 2003, Brown's stock value increased nearly 80 percent. At the end of that year, Brown signed a licensing deal to design and market footwear under Phillips-Van Heusen Corp.'s Bass label.

On May 27, 2015, Brown Shoe changed its name to Caleres, retaining the "Brown Shoe" name for a future line of men's footwear. The name Caleres comes from the Latin word calēre which means to glow with passion or intensity. The *5* that is part of the new logo was taken from a wear indicator stamp that was on the bottom of all shoes in the late 1800s that represented the company's promise of comfort and fit. The company paid $5 to the wearer if the stamp wore out.

Caleres purchased Allen Edmonds for $255 million in December 2016 from Brentwood Associates. As of November 2018, the company continues to be based in Clayton, Missouri.

== Business operations ==
Caleres operates 900 Famous Footwear stores in the United States. The company also distributes brands through retailers, and licensing Dr. Scholl's and Disney brand footwear.

=== Executives ===
Diane M. Sullivan served as president and CEO of Caleres from May 2011 until January 2023, after joining as president in 2003. She also became chairwoman of the board beginning February 2, 2014. In January 2023, Jay Schmidt took over the role of CEO and Sullivan moved into a position of Executive Chairman.

Brian Costello serves as president of Famous Footwear. Sam Edelman is division president of the eponymous Sam Edelman brand. Dan Friedman is division president of the company's global supply chain, and Jack Calandra serves as CFO.

== Shoe brands ==
Current brands include Famous Footwear, Stuart Weitzman, Naturalizer, Dr. Scholl's Shoes, LifeStride, Bzees, Blowfish Malibu, Circus by Sam Edelman, Rykä, Sam Edelman, Allen Edmonds, Franco Sarto, Vince, Vionic Shoes, Life Stride, Stuart Weitzman, Favorite Daughter, and Veronica Beard. Caleres also formerly managed Via Spiga and Carlos by Carlos Santana.

As of February 2011, American Sporting Goods Corporation operated as a subsidiary of Caleres. Its brands included Avia, Ryka and Nevados. In December 2016 Caleres acquired Allen Edmonds, a men's shoe company. They completed their acquisition of Stuart Weitzman in 2025.

== Company mascots ==
Since 1904, Caleres (Brown Shoe Company) mascots have been cartoon characters Buster Brown and his dog Tige. Both appear on the company's television commercials. In the 1940s and '50s, they became stars of Buster Brown Comics when the company made a brief foray into the comic book publishing industry. The characters appeared on the covers of the comic books, and each contained an adventure, such as Robin Hood. The characters were revived with an updated, more contemporary look for a brief advertising campaign in the 1980s and 1990s.

== See also ==
- Brown Shoe Company Factory
- Brown Shoe Company's Homes-Take Factory
- Boot and Shoe Workers' Union
- Hamilton-Brown Shoe Company Building
- Hamilton-Brown Shoe Factory (Columbia, Missouri)
