= Stuart Weitzman =

American shoe designer

Stuart A. Weitzman
- Born: 1941 (age 84–85)
- Education: University of Pennsylvania
- Occupations: Shoe designer and businessman
- Spouse: Jane Gershon
- Children: 2, including Rachael Sage

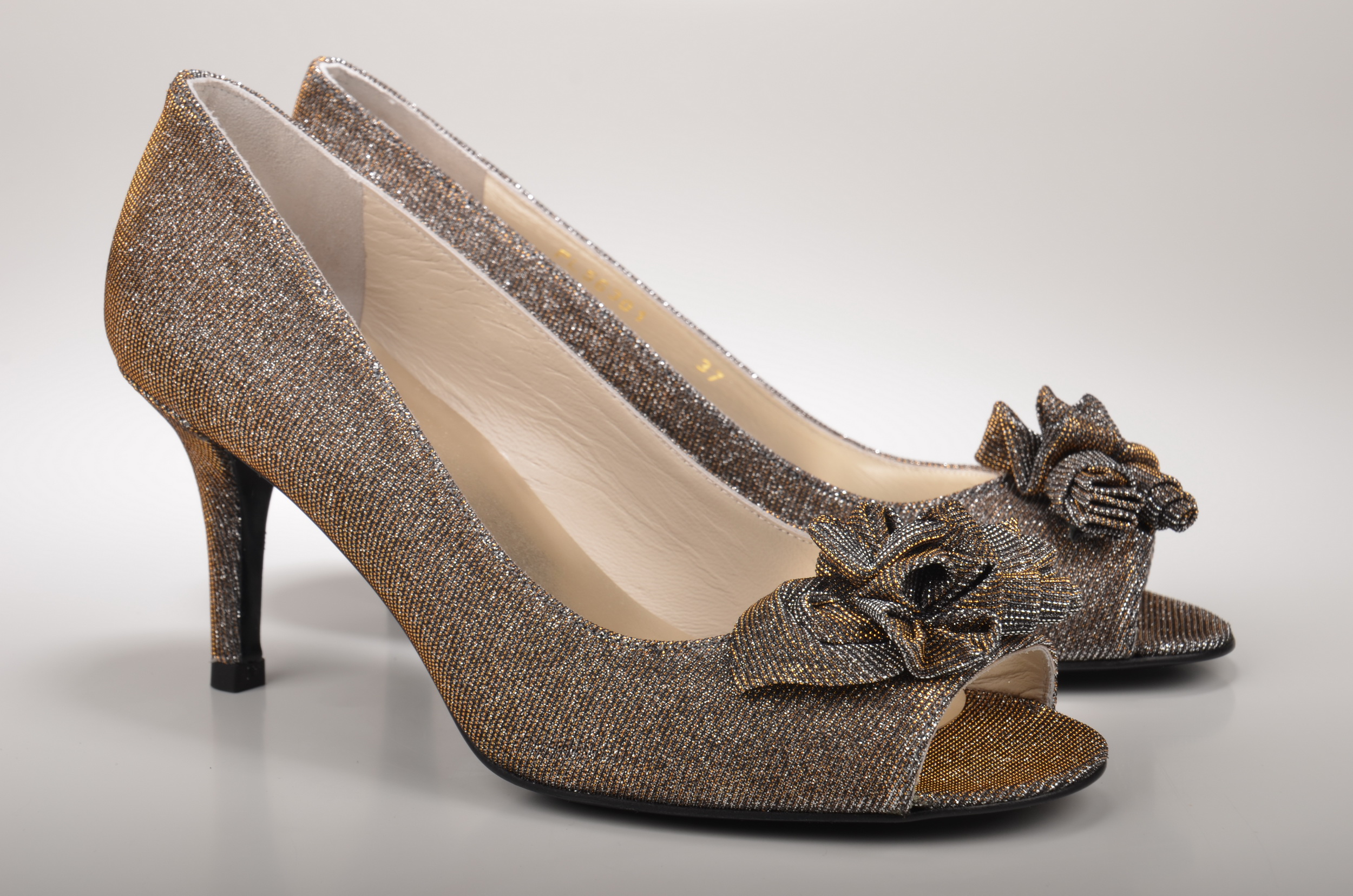
Stuart Weitzman Babbo Peep-Toe Pumps

Stuart A. Weitzman (born July 1941) is an American shoe designer, philatelist, and founder of the shoe company Stuart Weitzman. Weitzman has designed footwear for Beyoncé and Taylor Swift.

== Career ==
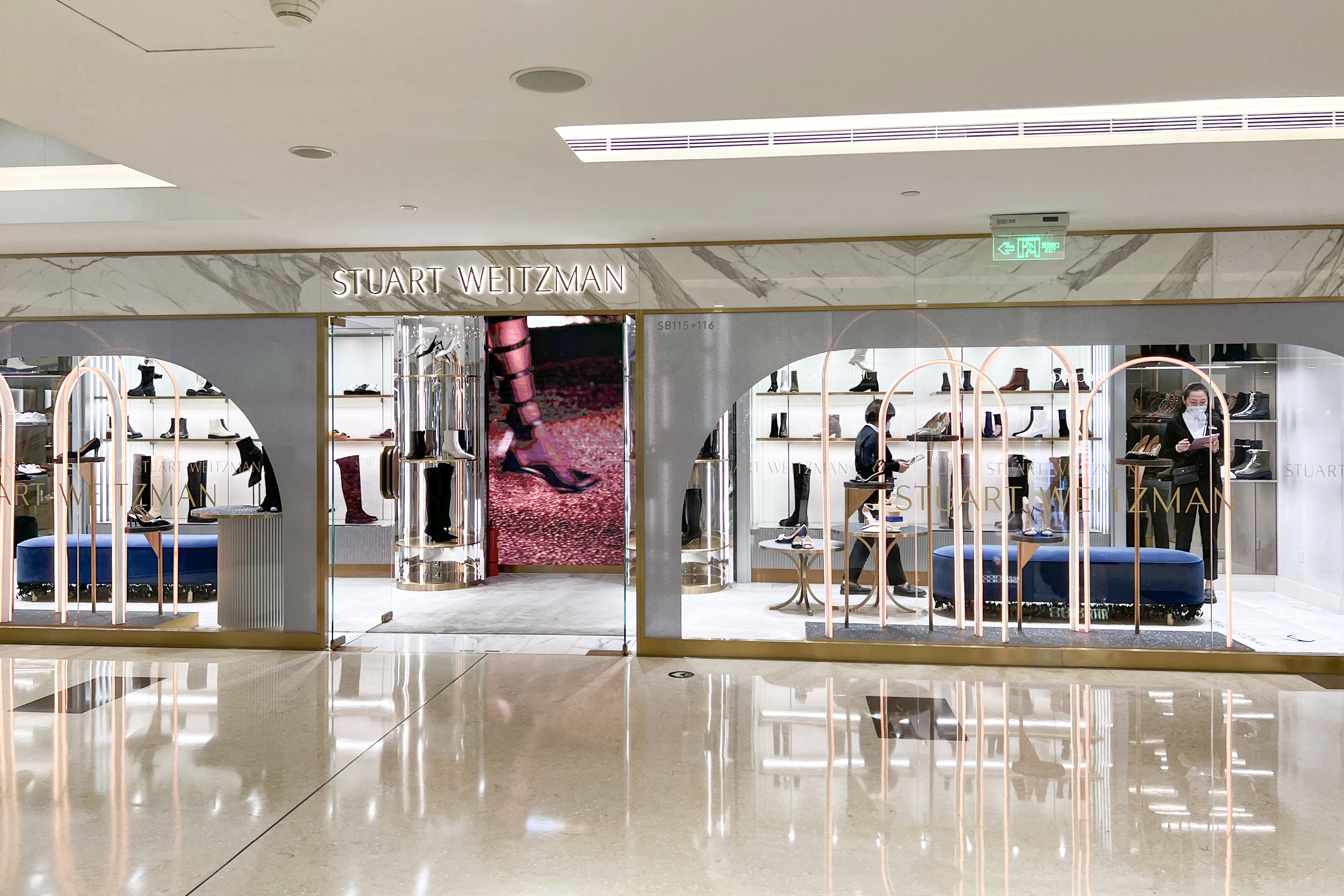
A Stuart Weitzman store in Beijing, China in 2021

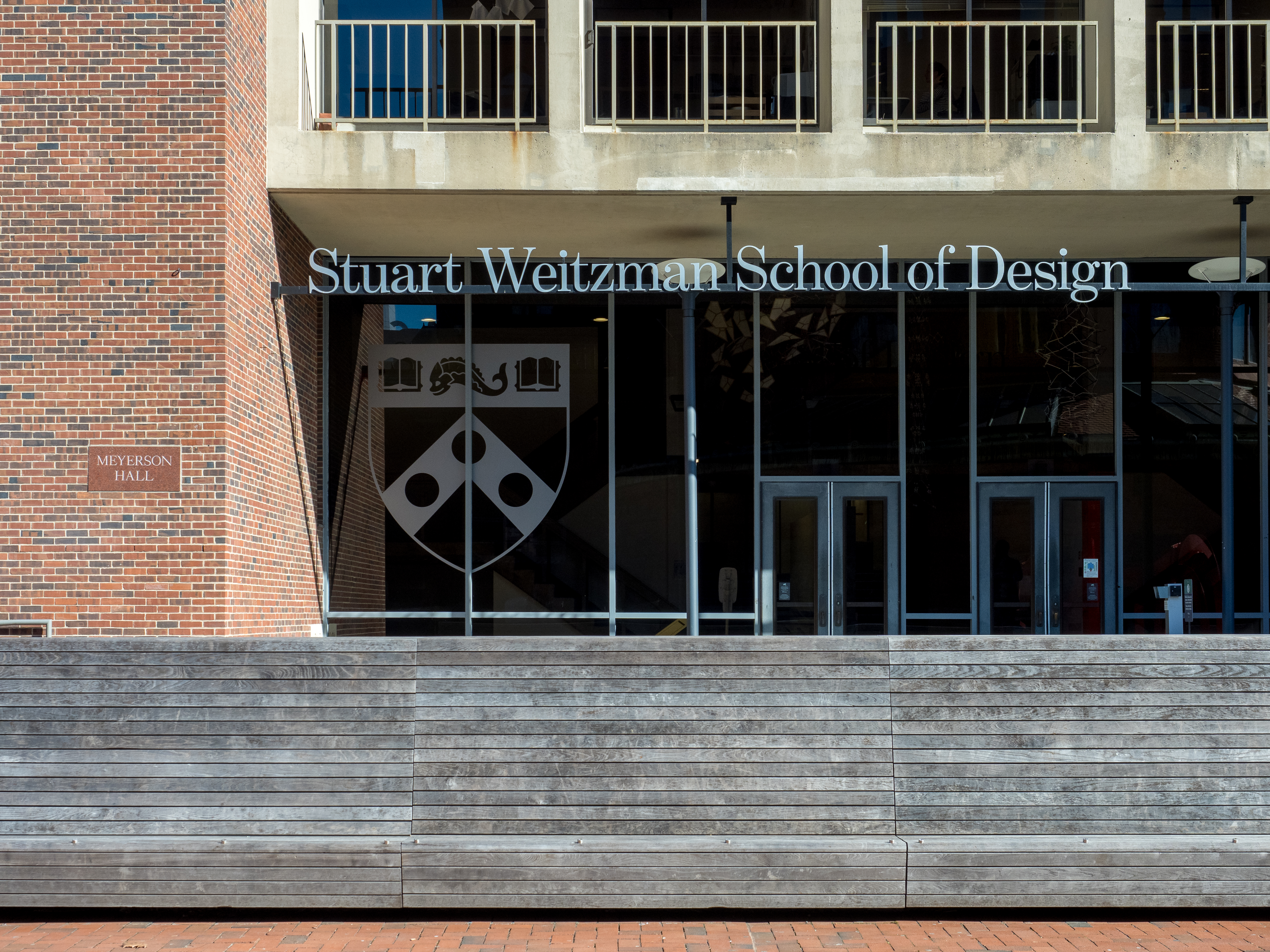
Stuart Weitzman School of Design, University of Pennsylvania

In the late 1950s, Weitzman's father, Seymour Weitzman, and his older brother Warren opened a shoe factory in Haverhill, Massachusetts, called "Seymour Shoes". Weitzman began designing shoes for his father's business in the early 1960s.

Weitzman graduated from George W. Hewlett High School in 1958 and the Wharton School at the University of Pennsylvania in 1963. When Seymour died in 1965, Warren and Stuart ran the business. They sold the business to a company in Spain in 1971, and Weitzman continued to design shoes for the company. In 1994, he bought back the business, but he continues to manufacture his shoe designs in Spain.

Weitzman is known for providing one-of-a-kind, "million dollar" shoes to Oscar nominees to wear at the Academy Awards such as the pair of platinum sandals adorned with 464 diamonds that actress Laura Harring wore to the 2002 ceremony. For the 2007 Oscars, shoes were designed for and provided to Diablo Cody, who subsequently declined to wear them, stating that she was not aware of nor interested in the publicity attendant with wearing the shoes. Weitzman uses unique materials including cork, vinyl, lucite, wallpaper, and 24-karat gold. His shoes are sold in over 70 countries.

=== Ownership and leadership ===
The eponymous company that Weitzman founded has changed hands a number of times. Jones Apparel Group purchased a majority stake in the company in 2010 and later bought the remaining 45 percent of shares retained by Weitzman in 2012. In January 2015, Sycamore Partners LLC (the private equity fund that owns Jones Apparel Group) agreed to sell the company to Coach, the luxury fashion house, for $574M. As part of the deal, Weitzman stayed on as a shoe designer for the company.

In May 2017, Stuart Weitzman Holdings, LLC, appointed Giovanni Morelli as Creative Director and Weitzman stepped down from his role.

== Personal life ==
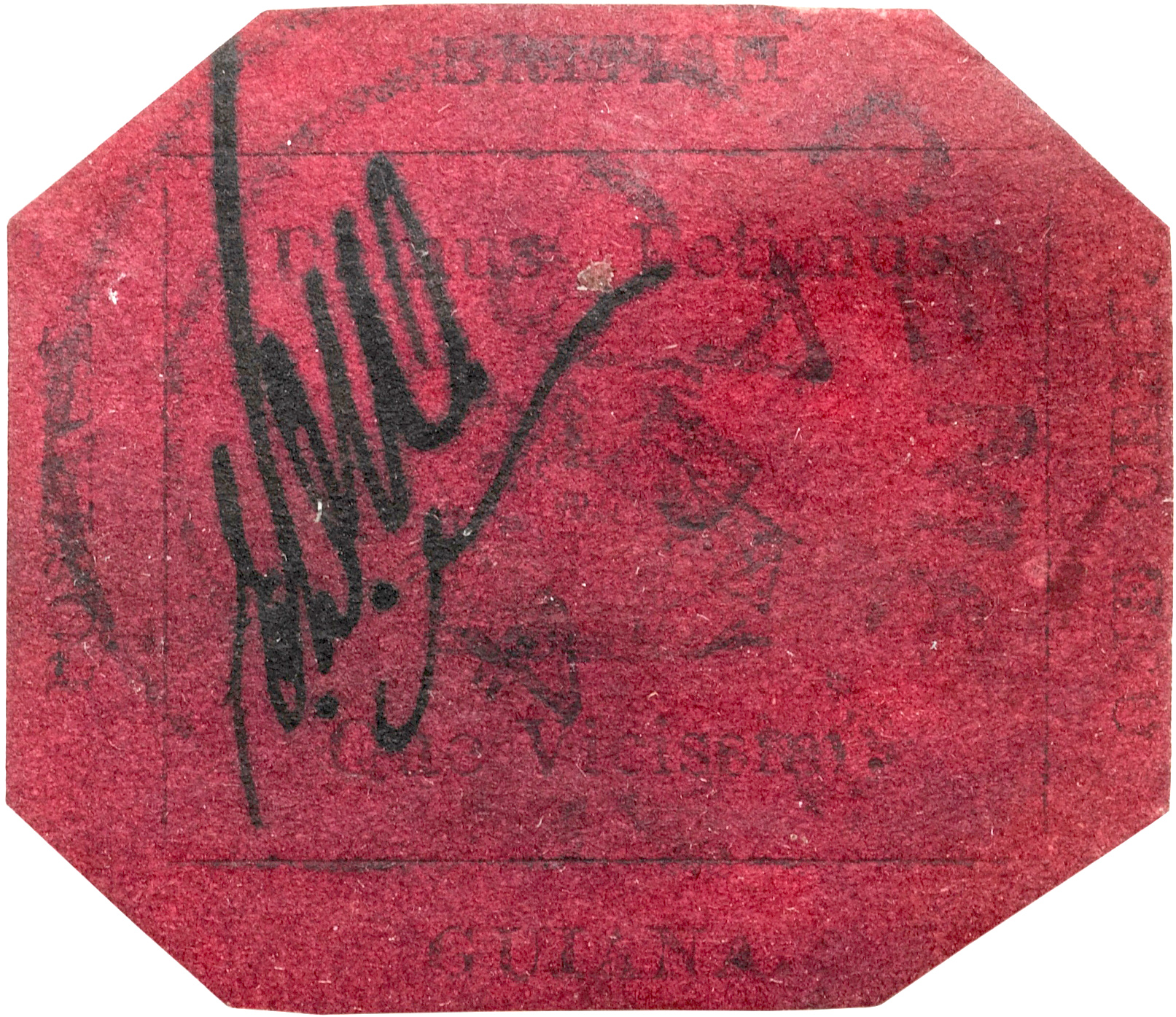
The British Guiana 1c magenta stamp for which Weitzman paid $9.48M in 2014.

Weitzman is married to Jane Gershon. Stuart and Jane have two daughters. His daughter Rachael Sage is a singer/songwriter. His daughter Elizabeth is a film critic and children's book author.

On June 17, 2014, Weitzman, who had collected stamps as a child, anonymously purchased the "world's most famous stamp", the British Guiana 1c magenta at a Sotheby's auction in New York for $9.48M, including buyer's premium, the highest price ever paid for a postage stamp. Weitzman later identified himself as the purchaser and lent the stamp to the National Postal Museum for exhibition. In June 2015, Weitzman also identified himself as the owner of the unique plate block of four 1918 U.S. 24-cent Inverted Jennies, widely regarded as the world's most celebrated philatelic printing error. In March 2021 Weitzman revealed himself as having purchased the only legal St. Gaudens 1933 double eagle in 2002 for $7.6M, then the most expensive coin ever sold.

All three items, dubbed the "Three Treasures", were sold at auction by Sotheby's to an anonymous buyer in June 2021. The items sold for $8.3m, $4.93m and $18.9m, respectively.

On February 26, 2019, University of Pennsylvania President Amy Gutmann announced that the School of Design will be renamed the University of Pennsylvania Stuart Weitzman School of Design.

== Notes ==
- "Jay H. Baker Retailing Initiative speaker series presents President of Stuart Weitzman & Co.," 4/18/05
- "Bear Stearns Tries on Shoes Its Merchant Banking arm is buying a stake in high-end shoemaker Stuart Weitzman Holdings, in another foray into retail," 6/29/05
- "US: Stuart Weitzman steps-up its technology infrastructure," 5/17/06
- Cody Refuses to Wear Weitzman's Shoes to the Oscars, 2/25/08
