= Brown Shoe Company Factory =

- U.S. National Register of Historic Places
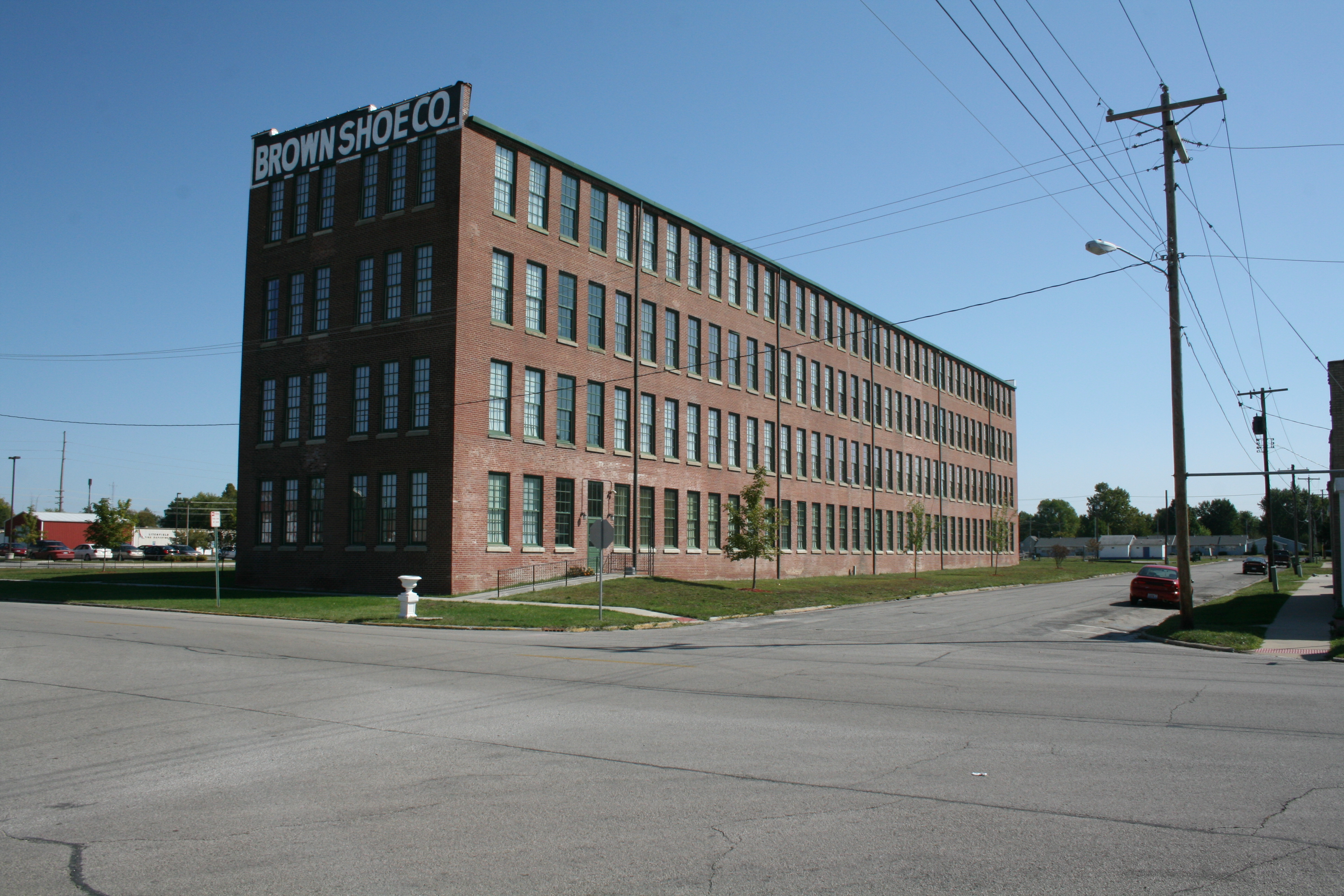

- Location within Illinois Location within the United States
- Location: 212 S. State St., Litchfield, Illinois
- Coordinates: 39°10′26″N 89°39′16″W
- Area: 2.5 acres (1.0 ha)
- Built: 1922
- Architect: Albert Bartleton Groves; et al.
- Architectural style: Late 19th And Early 20th Century American Movements, Industrial
- NRHP reference No.: 06001019
- Added to NRHP: November 15, 2006

The Brown Shoe Company Factory is a historic factory located at 212 S. State St. in Litchfield, Illinois. The factory opened in 1917 to produce shoes for the St. Louis–based Brown Shoe Company. Prominent St. Louis architect Albert B. Groves designed the factory, which was one of twelve he designed for the company. The factory became Litchfield's second-largest industry and brought the community prosperity through the Great Depression; in addition, its employees formed a civic organization that created a public park on company property. The factory closed in 1967; it was later used by cabinet manufacturer Adenca.

The factory was added to the National Register of Historic Places on November 15, 2006.
