= National Register of Historic Places listings in Downtown and Downtown West St. Louis =

This is a list of properties and historic districts within the Downtown St. Louis and Downtown West, St. Louis areas of the city of St. Louis, Missouri, that are listed on the National Register of Historic Places. The downtown area is bounded by Cole Street to the north, the riverfront to the east, Chouteau Avenue to the south, and Jefferson Avenue to the west. Tucker Avenue divides Downtown to the east from Downtown West to the west.

For other listings in the city, see National Register of Historic Places listings in St. Louis north and west of downtown and National Register of Historic Places listings in St. Louis south and west of downtown. For listings in St. Louis County, outside the city limits of St. Louis, see National Register of Historic Places listings in St. Louis County, Missouri.

== Current listings ==
	Name on the Register	Image	Date listed	Location	Description
1	Advertising Building	Advertising Building	January 18, 1985 (#85000106)	1627–1629 Locust St. 38°37′56″N 90°12′14″W	
2	Ambassador Theater Building	Ambassador Theater Building	March 29, 1983 (#83001039)	411 N. 7th St. 38°37′46″N 90°11′28″W	Demolished in 1996.
3	American Theater	American Theater	March 18, 1985 (#85000617)	416 N. 9th St. 38°37′48″N 90°11′34″W	
4	American Zinc, Lead and Smelting Company Building	American Zinc, Lead and Smelting Company Building	May 4, 1998 (#98000363)	20 S. 4th St. 38°37′28″N 90°11′19″W	
5	Arcade Building	Arcade Building	March 23, 2003 (#03000126)	810 Olive St. 38°37′42″N 90°11′34″W	
6	Balmer & Weber Music House Co. Building	Balmer & Weber Music House Co. Building	August 31, 2000 (#00001008)	1004 Olive St. 38°37′44″N 90°11′42″W	
7	Beethoven Conservatory	Beethoven Conservatory	March 2, 1989 (#89000075)	2301 Locust St. 38°38′03″N 90°12′44″W	
8	Bell Telephone Building	Bell Telephone Building	August 5, 1999 (#99000936)	920 Olive St. 38°37′44″N 90°11′40″W	
9	Berry Motor Car Service Building	Berry Motor Car Service Building	July 19, 2010 (#10000480)	2220 Washington Ave. 38°38′04″N 90°12′41″W	
10	Blackwell-Wielandy Building	Blackwell-Wielandy Building	July 21, 1983 (#83001040)	1601–1609 Locust St. 38°37′56″N 90°12′11″W	
11	Board of Education Building	Board of Education Building	January 12, 2005 (#04001475)	901–911 Locust St. and 401–409 N. Ninth St. 38°37′48″N 90°11′36″W	
12	Boatman's Bank Building	Boatman's Bank Building	October 22, 1998 (#98001265)	300 North Broadway; 38°37′40″N 90°11′19″W	
13	A. D. Brown Building	A. D. Brown Building	March 28, 1980 (#80004502)	1136 Washington Ave. 38°37′53″N 90°11′47″W	
14	Paul Brown Building	Paul Brown Building	December 12, 2002 (#02001496)	818 Olive St. 38°37′42″N 90°11′36″W	
15	Building at 1009 Olive St.	Building at 1009 Olive St.	May 9, 2002 (#02000468)	1009 Olive St. 38°37′46″N 90°11′42″W	
16	Building at 1121–23 Locust St.	Building at 1121–23 Locust St.	August 4, 2004 (#04000785)	1121–23 Locust St. 38°37′50″N 90°11′46″W	
17	Building at 1300 Washington Avenue	Building at 1300 Washington Avenue	September 2, 1982 (#82004732)	1300–1310 Washington Ave. 38°37′55″N 90°11′55″W	
18	Robert G. Campbell House	Robert G. Campbell House	April 21, 1977 (#77001560)	1508 Locust St. 38°37′53″N 90°12′06″W	
19	Centenary Methodist Episcopal Church, South	Centenary Methodist Episcopal Church, South	January 16, 1997 (#96001596)	55 Plaza Sq. 38°37′50″N 90°12′13″W	
20	Centennial Malt House	Centennial Malt House	November 15, 2005 (#05001281)	2017–19 Chouteau Ave. 38°37′17″N 90°12′47″W	
21	Century Building and Syndicate Trust Building	Century Building and Syndicate Trust Building	October 16, 2002 (#02001054)	Bounded by Locust, 9th, 10th, and Olive Sts. 38°37′46″N 90°11′39″W	The Century Building was demolished and replaced by a parking garage in February 2005.
22	Chemical Building	Chemical Building	March 19, 1982 (#82004734)	721 Olive St. 38°37′43″N 90°11′31″W	
23	Chouteau's Landing Historic District	Chouteau's Landing Historic District	April 12, 2024 (#100010146)	Cedar St., South 1st St., Chouteau Ave., South 3rd St. 38°37′02″N 90°11′24″W	
24	Christ Church Cathedral	Christ Church Cathedral	March 7, 1990 (#90000345)	1210 Locust St. 38°37′50″N 90°11′54″W	
25	City Club Building	City Club Building	June 6, 2002 (#02000610)	1012–1024 Locust St. 38°37′48″N 90°11′43″W	
26	Crunden-Martin Manufacturing Company	Crunden-Martin Manufacturing Company	February 9, 2005 (#05000013)	104 Cedar, 760 S. 2nd St., and 757 S. 2nd St. 38°37′04″N 90°11′21″W	
27	Cupples Warehouse District	Cupples Warehouse District	June 26, 1998 (#85003615)	Roughly Spruce and Clark Sts. between 7th and 11th Sts. 38°37′26″N 90°11′51″W	
28	Delany Building	Delany Building	March 1, 2002 (#02000102)	1000–06 Locust St. 38°37′47″N 90°11′41″W	
29	Downtown YMCA Building	Downtown YMCA Building	June 27, 2014 (#14000379)	1528 Locust St. 38°37′54″N 90°12′10″W	
30	Eads Bridge	Eads Bridge	October 15, 1966 (#66000946)	Spanning the Mississippi River at Washington St. 38°37′45″N 90°10′52″W	
31	Emerson Electric Company Building	Emerson Electric Company Building	November 6, 1986 (#86003138)	2012–2018 Washington Ave. 38°38′02″N 90°12′31″W	
32	Employment Security Building	Employment Security Building	May 21, 2018 (#100002429)	505 Washington Ave. 38°37′48″N 90°11′19″W	
33	Endicott-Johnson Shoe Distribution Plant	Endicott-Johnson Shoe Distribution Plant	October 11, 2007 (#07001074)	1132 Spruce St. 38°37′26″N 90°11′58″W	
34	Engine House No. 32	Engine House No. 32	November 24, 2015 (#15000816)	2000 Washington Ave. & 503 N. 20th St. 38°38′03″N 90°12′28″W	
35	Executive Office Building	Executive Office Building	November 14, 2012 (#12000926)	515–517 Olive St. 38°37′41″N 90°11′23″W	
36	Farm and Home Savings and Loan Association	Farm and Home Savings and Loan Association	October 29, 2008 (#08001025)	1001 Locust St. 38°37′48″N 90°11′40″W	
37	Fashion Square Building	Fashion Square Building	October 9, 1985 (#85003105)	1307 Washington Ave. 38°37′57″N 90°11′55″W	
38	Eugene Field House	Eugene Field House	August 19, 1975 (#75002137)	634 S. Broadway; 38°37′12″N 90°11′31″W	Home of civil rights lawyer Roswell Field
39	Ford Apartments	Ford Apartments	January 26, 2005 (#04001562)	1405 Pine St. 38°37′47″N 90°12′03″W	
40	Franklin School	Franklin School	March 9, 2005 (#05000121)	814 N. 19th St. 38°38′08″N 90°12′19″W	
41	Frisco Building	Frisco Building	March 29, 1983 (#83001046)	906 Olive St. 38°37′44″N 90°11′38″W	
42	Fulton Bag Company Building	Fulton Bag Company Building	September 5, 1991 (#91001372)	612–618 S. 7th St. 38°37′16″N 90°11′38″W	
43	Gateway Arch	Gateway Arch	May 28, 1987 (#87001423)	Memorial Dr. between the Poplar St. and Eads bridges 38°37′28″N 90°11′06″W	
44	General American Life Insurance Co. Buildings	General American Life Insurance Co. Buildings	October 22, 2002 (#02001206)	1501–1511 Locust St. 38°37′55″N 90°12′06″W	
45	General American Life Insurance Co. Buildings	General American Life Insurance Co. Buildings	March 27, 2008 (#07000461)	700 Market St. 38°37′32″N 90°11′35″W	Now known as 700 Market.
46	William A. Gill Building	William A. Gill Building	May 8, 2009 (#09000282)	622 Olive St. 38°37′41″N 90°11′28″W	
47	Grand-Leader (Stix, Baer & Fuller Dry Goods Co.) Building	Grand-Leader (Stix, Baer & Fuller Dry Goods Co.) Building	July 17, 2003 (#03000650)	601 Washington Ave. 38°37′50″N 90°11′22″W	
48	Haas Building	Haas Building	July 28, 2004 (#04000747)	410 N. Jefferson Ave. and 2327 Locust St. 38°38′03″N 90°12′48″W	
49	Elias Haas Building	Elias Haas Building	April 12, 2006 (#06000248)	2223 Locust St. 38°38′02″N 90°12′43″W	
50	Hadley-Dean Glass Company	Hadley-Dean Glass Company	August 1, 1979 (#79003634)	701–705 N. 11th St. 38°37′56″N 90°11′42″W	
51	Halsey-Packard Building	Halsey-Packard Building	December 14, 2005 (#05001036)	2201–2211 Locust St. 38°38′02″N 90°12′40″W	
52	Hamilton-Brown Shoe Factory	Hamilton-Brown Shoe Factory	May 5, 2000 (#00000437)	2031 Olive St. 38°37′57″N 90°12′34″W	
53	Hargadine-McKittrick Dry Goods Building	Hargadine-McKittrick Dry Goods Building	March 19, 1982 (#82004728)	911 Washington Ave. 38°37′53″N 90°11′36″W	
54	Hotel Jefferson	Hotel Jefferson	October 24, 2003 (#03001066)	415 N. Tucker Boulevard; 38°37′51″N 90°11′51″W	
55	Hotel Statler	Hotel Statler	March 19, 1982 (#82004729)	822 Washington Ave. 38°37′50″N 90°11′33″W	
56	International Fur Exchange Building	International Fur Exchange Building	April 13, 1998 (#98000313)	2–14 S. 4th St. 38°37′30″N 90°11′19″W	
57	J.C. Penney Co. Warehouse Building	J.C. Penney Co. Warehouse Building	December 31, 1998 (#98001563)	400 S. 14th St. 38°37′28″N 90°12′07″W	
58	Gateway Arch National Park	Gateway Arch National Park	October 15, 1966 (#66000941)	Mississippi River between Washington and Poplar Sts. 38°37′30″N 90°11′12″W	
59	J. Kennard and Sons Carpet Company Building	J. Kennard and Sons Carpet Company Building	May 5, 2000 (#00000438)	400 Washington Ave. 38°37′46″N 90°11′14″W	
60	Kiel Opera House	Kiel Opera House	February 11, 2000 (#00000016)	1400 Market St. 38°37′40″N 90°12′07″W	
61	Kieselhorst Piano Company Building	Kieselhorst Piano Company Building	April 10, 2008 (#08000268)	1007 Olive St. 38°37′46″N 90°11′41″W	
62	Laclede Building	Laclede Building	August 6, 1998 (#98000994)	408 Olive St. 38°37′38″N 90°11′18″W	
63	Laclede's Landing	Laclede's Landing	August 25, 1976 (#76002262)	Roughly bounded by Washington, N. 3rd, Dr. Martin Luther King Dr., and the Mississippi River; 38°37′48″N 90°11′02″W	
64	Lambert Building	Lambert Building	February 24, 1983 (#83001047)	2101–2107 Locust St. 38°38′01″N 90°12′34″W	
65	Lambert-Deacon-Hull Printing Company Building	Lambert-Deacon-Hull Printing Company Building	October 20, 1980 (#80004508)	2100 Locust St. 38°37′59″N 90°12′35″W	
66	LaSalle Building	LaSalle Building	November 15, 2005 (#05001282)	501 Olive St. 38°37′41″N 90°11′21″W	
67	Leacock Sporting Goods Company Building	Leacock Sporting Goods Company Building	April 24, 2017 (#100000912)	921 Locust St. 38°37′47″N 90°11′39″W	
68	Robert E. Lee Hotel	Robert E. Lee Hotel	February 7, 2007 (#07000021)	205 N. 18th St. 38°37′51″N 90°12′22″W	
69	Lennox Hotel	Lennox Hotel	September 6, 1984 (#84002647)	823–827 Washington Ave. 38°37′52″N 90°11′33″W	
70	Lesan-Gould Building	Lesan-Gould Building	November 6, 1986 (#86003137)	1320–1324 Washington Ave. 38°37′55″N 90°11′58″W	
71	Liggett & Myers Tobacco Co. Building	Liggett & Myers Tobacco Co. Building	February 10, 1983 (#83001049)	1900–1912 Pine St. 38°37′51″N 90°12′28″W	
72	Liggett and Myers (Rice-Stix) Building	Liggett and Myers (Rice-Stix) Building	February 16, 1984 (#84002648)	1000 Washington Ave. 38°37′51″N 90°11′40″W	
73	Lindell Real Estate Company Building	Lindell Real Estate Company Building	March 19, 1982 (#82004737)	1015 Washington Ave. 38°37′54″N 90°11′40″W	
74	Louderman Building	Louderman Building	November 22, 2000 (#00001399)	317 N. 11th St. 38°37′48″N 90°11′44″W	
75	Lucas Avenue Industrial Historic District	Lucas Avenue Industrial Historic District	August 31, 2000 (#00001009)	Bounded by Washington, Delmar, 20th, and 21st Sts.; also roughly bounded by Locust St., Delmar, and 19th and 20th Sts. 38°38′06″N 90°12′29″W	Second set of boundaries represents a boundary increase of April 24, 2007
76	Majestic Hotel	Majestic Hotel	January 26, 1984 (#84002653)	1017–23 Pine St. and 200–10 N. 11th St. 38°37′44″N 90°11′44″W	
77	Majestic Manufacturing Company Buildings	Majestic Manufacturing Company Buildings	December 31, 1998 (#98001562)	2014 Delmar Boulevard and 2011–2017 Lucas Ave. 38°38′08″N 90°12′29″W	
78	Mansion House Center Historic District	Mansion House Center Historic District	August 23, 2016 (#16000547)	200–444 N. 4th St. 38°37′41″N 90°11′15″W	
79	Marquette Hotel	Marquette Hotel	September 26, 1985 (#85002557)	1734 Washington Ave. 38°38′00″N 90°12′17″W	Demolished in 1988.
80	Maryland Hotel	Maryland Hotel	February 16, 1996 (#96000044)	205 N. 9th St. 38°37′42″N 90°11′38″W	
81	May Company Department Store Building	May Company Department Store Building	June 23, 1983 (#83001050)	509–23 Washington Ave. 38°37′50″N 90°11′20″W	
82	Mayfair Hotel	Mayfair Hotel	September 17, 1979 (#79003638)	806 St. Charles Ave. 38°37′48″N 90°11′32″W	
83	Midwest Terminal Building	Midwest Terminal Building	January 23, 2017 (#16000548)	700–720 N. Tucker Blvd. 38°37′57″N 90°11′47″W	
84	Mississippi Valley Trust Company Building	Mississippi Valley Trust Company Building	May 25, 2001 (#01000544)	401 Pine St. 38°37′37″N 90°11′18″W	
85	Missouri Athletic Club Building	Missouri Athletic Club Building	April 16, 2007 (#07000325)	405–409 Washington Ave. 38°37′48″N 90°11′14″W	13-story Renaissance Revival design by William B. Ittner; adjacent to an entrance to the Eads Bridge
86	Missouri Electric Light and Power Co.	Missouri Electric Light and Power Co.	September 6, 2005 (#05000996)	1906–1932 Locust St. 38°37′58″N 90°12′28″W	
87	Missouri Pacific Building	Missouri Pacific Building	November 27, 2002 (#02001441)	210 N. 13th St. 38°37′46″N 90°11′56″W	Office building for the Missouri Pacific Railroad, designed by Mauran. Russell & Crowell and railroad Chief Engineer E. M. Tucker, built in 1928.
88	Moon Brothers Carriage Company Building	Moon Brothers Carriage Company Building	September 28, 2005 (#05001094)	1706 Delmar Boulevard; 38°38′04″N 90°12′11″W	
89	Municipal Courts Building	Municipal Courts Building	November 14, 2012 (#12000927)	1320 Market St. 38°37′38″N 90°12′03″W	
90	Municipal Service Building	Municipal Service Building	January 12, 2005 (#04001474)	Bounded by Clark, Spruce, 11th, and Tucker; 38°37′28″N 90°11′56″W	
91	National Cash Register Company Sales and Repair Building	National Cash Register Company Sales and Repair Building	October 16, 2013 (#13000840)	1011 Olive St. 38°37′46″N 90°11′42″W	
92	Old Laclede Gas and Light Company Building	Old Laclede Gas and Light Company Building	November 26, 1980 (#80004392)	1017 Olive St. 38°37′46″N 90°11′43″W	
93	Old Weber Implement and Automobile Company	Old Weber Implement and Automobile Company	February 28, 2008 (#08000093)	1900 Locust St. 38°37′57″N 90°12′25″W	
94	Olive and Locust Historic Business District	Olive and Locust Historic Business District	November 7, 2007 (#07001158)	Roughly bounded by N. Jefferson, Olive, 21st, and St. Charles Sts. 38°38′01″N 90°12′44″W	
95	One Bell Center	One Bell Center	September 26, 2022 (#100008205)	909 Chestnut St. 38°37′40″N 90°11′41″W	
96	Peabody Coal Company National Headquarters	Peabody Coal Company National Headquarters	December 3, 2008 (#08001131)	301 N. Memorial Dr. 38°37′39″N 90°11′12″W	
97	Pet Plaza	Pet Plaza	October 19, 2004 (#04000749)	400 S. 4th St. 38°37′17″N 90°11′24″W	
98	Peters Shoe Company Building	Peters Shoe Company Building	January 26, 1984 (#84002663)	1232–36 Washington Ave. 38°37′54″N 90°11′53″W	
99	Phipps-Wallace Store Building	Phipps-Wallace Store Building	November 22, 2000 (#00001398)	312–316 N. 8th St. 38°37′45″N 90°11′31″W	
100	Plaza Square Apartments Historic District	Plaza Square Apartments Historic District	July 12, 2007 (#07000705)	Bounded by 15th, Olive, 17th, and Chestnut Sts. 38°37′49″N 90°12′16″W	
101	Polar Wave Ice and Fuel Company, Plant No. 6	Polar Wave Ice and Fuel Company, Plant No. 6	July 19, 2006 (#06000629)	502 LaSalle St. 38°36′59″N 90°11′39″W	
102	The Publicity Building	The Publicity Building	October 2, 2017 (#100001691)	1133 Pine St. 38°37′44″N 90°11′49″W	
103	Railway Exchange Building	Railway Exchange Building	June 11, 2009 (#09000411)	600 Locust St. 38°37′43″N 90°11′26″W	
104	St. Louis Globe-Democrat Building	St. Louis Globe-Democrat Building	June 17, 2019 (#100004066)	900 N. Tucker Blvd. (formerly 1133 Franklin Ave); 38°38′06″N 90°11′44″W	
105	St. Louis Mart and Terminal Warehouse	St. Louis Mart and Terminal Warehouse	July 28, 2016 (#16000477)	1222 Spruce St. 38°37′28″N 90°12′01″W	now the Robert A. Young Federal Building
106	St. Louis News Company	St. Louis News Company	September 16, 2010 (#10000755)	1008–1010 Locust St. 38°37′47″N 90°11′41″W	
107	St. Louis Post-Dispatch Building	St. Louis Post-Dispatch Building	February 11, 2000 (#00000015)	1139 Olive St. 38°37′48″N 90°11′49″W	
108	St. Louis Post-Dispatch Printing Building	St. Louis Post-Dispatch Printing Building	August 29, 1984 (#84002672)	1111 Olive St. 38°37′47″N 90°11′47″W	
109	Saint Louis Provident Association Building	Saint Louis Provident Association Building	June 20, 2001 (#01000652)	2221 Locust St. 38°38′02″N 90°12′42″W	
110	St. Louis Union Station	St. Louis Union Station	June 15, 1970 (#70000888)	18th and Market Sts. 38°37′45″N 90°12′27″W	
111	St. Mary's Infirmary	St. Mary's Infirmary	April 18, 2007 (#07000322)	1536–1548 Papin St. 38°37′14″N 90°12′25″W	Demolished in 2016.
112	St. Mary of Victories Church	St. Mary of Victories Church	August 28, 1980 (#80004510)	744 S. 3rd St. 38°37′05″N 90°11′26″W	
113	Scruggs-Vandervoort-Barney Warehouse	Scruggs-Vandervoort-Barney Warehouse	February 21, 1985 (#85000320)	917 Locust St. 38°37′48″N 90°11′38″W	
114	Security Building	Security Building	February 10, 2000 (#00000083)	319 N. 4th St. 38°37′41″N 90°11′16″W	
115	Seven-Up Company Headquarters	Seven-Up Company Headquarters	February 24, 2004 (#04000089)	1300–1316 Convention Plaza; 38°38′00″N 90°11′51″W	Now known as the Uncola Lofts
116	Martin Shaughnessy Building	Martin Shaughnessy Building	September 15, 2005 (#05001035)	2201–2215 Washington; 38°38′06″N 90°12′40″W	
117	Shell Building	Shell Building	June 9, 2015 (#15000319)	1221 Locust St. 38°37′51″N 90°11′52″W	
118	Silk Exchange Building	Silk Exchange Building	September 2, 1982 (#82004742)	501–511 N. Tucker Boulevard; 38°37′53″N 90°11′50″W	Destroyed in a 1995 fire.
119	South Fourth Street Commercial District	South Fourth Street Commercial District	April 12, 2006 (#06000245)	740–908 S. 4th St., 319 Gratiot, and 317–321 Lombard; 38°37′07″N 90°11′30″W	
120	Spool Cotton Co. Building	Spool Cotton Co. Building	August 4, 2004 (#04000786)	1113–15 Locust St. 38°37′50″N 90°11′45″W	
121	William A. Stickney Cigar Company Building	William A. Stickney Cigar Company Building	August 20, 2009 (#09000627)	209 N. 4th St. 38°37′37″N 90°11′17″W	
122	Thiebe-Stierlin Music Company Building	Thiebe-Stierlin Music Company Building	January 28, 2004 (#03001507)	1006 Olive St. 38°37′44″N 90°11′43″W	
123	U.S. Customhouse and Post Office	U.S. Customhouse and Post Office	November 22, 1968 (#68000053)	8th and Olive Sts. 38°37′44″N 90°11′34″W	
124	Union Market	Union Market	January 16, 1984 (#84002692)	Broadway and Lucas Ave. 38°37′52″N 90°11′18″W	
125	Union Station Post Office Annex	Union Station Post Office Annex	September 26, 1985 (#85002488)	329 S. 18th St. 38°37′35″N 90°12′27″W	
126	Union Trust Company Building	Union Trust Company Building	June 17, 1982 (#82004743)	705 Olive St. 38°37′43″N 90°11′29″W	
127	United Shoe Machinery Building	United Shoe Machinery Building	June 27, 2007 (#07000619)	2200–2208 Washington Ave. 38°38′04″N 90°12′39″W	
128	Wainwright Building	Wainwright Building	May 23, 1968 (#68000054)	709 Chestnut St. 38°37′37″N 90°11′32″W	One of the first skyscrapers, designed by Louis Sullivan and others
129	Washington Avenue Historic District	Washington Avenue Historic District	February 12, 1987 (#86003733)	Roughly bounded by Delmar, Tucker, St. Charles, N. 15th, Olive, N. 18th, Washington Ave., and Lucas St. 38°37′57″N 90°12′00″W	
130	Washington Avenue: East of Tucker District	Washington Avenue: East of Tucker District	March 24, 1987 (#87000458)	Roughly bounded by Lucas, N. 9th, St. Charles, Locust, and Tucker Boulevard; 38°37′53″N 90°11′42″W	
131	Weber Implement and Automobile Company Building	Weber Implement and Automobile Company Building	April 21, 2004 (#04000343)	1815 Locust St. 38°37′58″N 90°12′22″W	
132	John Weisert Tobacco Company	John Weisert Tobacco Company	June 16, 2004 (#04000602)	1120 S. 6th St. 38°36′57″N 90°11′41″W	
133	Willys-Overland Building	Willys-Overland Building	December 30, 1999 (#99001617)	2300 Locust St. 38°38′01″N 90°12′45″W	
134	Winkelmeyer Building	Winkelmeyer Building	July 11, 1985 (#85001500)	11th and Walnut Sts. 38°37′34″N 90°11′51″W	
135	Wrought Iron Range Company Building	Wrought Iron Range Company Building	July 28, 2004 (#04000746)	1901–1937 Washington Ave. 38°38′03″N 90°12′25″W	

== Former listings ==
	Name on the Register	Image	Date listed	Date removed	Location	Description
1	Olive Street Terra Cotta District	Olive Street Terra Cotta District	January 2, 1986 (#86000006)	May 8, 2009	600–622 Olive St. 38°37′40″N 90°11′27″W	Delisted due to all but one building being demolished. The remaining building, the Gill Building, was relisted as a separate entity.
2	USS INAUGURAL (fleet minesweeper)	USS INAUGURAL (fleet minesweeper)	January 14, 1986 (#86000091)	August 7, 2001	300 N Wharf St.	Listed as a National Historic Landmark. Broke loose from her moorings during the Great Flood of 1993. Ran aground and sank a mile downriver.
