= Electric Building =

Electric Building may refer to:

in the United States (by state then city)

- Western Electric Company Building, Atlanta, Georgia, listed on the National Register of Historic Places (NRHP) in Fulton County
- Westinghouse Electric Company Building, Atlanta, Georgia, listed on the NRHP in Fulton County
- Union Electric Telephone & Telegraph, Davenport, Iowa, listed on the NRHP in Scott County
- Electric Building (Louisville, Kentucky), listed on the NRHP in Jefferson County
- Automatic Electric Company Building, Chicago, Illinois, listed on the NRHP in Chicago
- United Electric Co. Building, Springfield, Massachusetts, listed on the NRHP in Hampden County
- Union Electric Administration Building-Lakeside, Lakeside, Missouri, listed on the NRHP in Miller County
- Emerson Electric Company Building, St. Louis, Missouri, listed on the NRHP in St. Louis
- Electric Building (Billings, Montana), listed on the NRHP in Yellowstone County
- Electric Park Pavilion, Blackwell, Oklahoma, listed on the NRHP in Kay County
- Electric Building (Portland, Oregon), listed on the NRHP in Multnomah County
- Electric Building (Fort Worth, Texas), listed on the NRHP in Tarrant County

== See also ==
- General Electric Building (disambiguation)
