= Frederick A. Graf =

Frederick A. Graf (died May 4, 1938) was an architect in Wisconsin. He designed the Old Ozaukee County Courthouse in Port Washington, Wisconsin and several residences that are contributing properties to historical districts.

His father was a French engraver who immigrated to the U.S.

Architect Hugo K. Graf was his son.

== Work ==
- Old Ozaukee County Courthouse, 109 W. Main St. Port Washington, Ozaukee County, Wisconsin
- Hotel in Port Washington
- 2534 N. Lake Drive, Milwaukee
- F. Schimonek House, 2903 W McKinley Blvd, Milwaukee
- Christ Polish Baptist Church (Immanual Community Baptist Church), 2009-2013 S. 19th Street, Milwaukee
