= Seven-Up Headquarters =

Historic office building in St. Louis

- Seven-Up Company Headquarters
- U.S. National Register of Historic Places
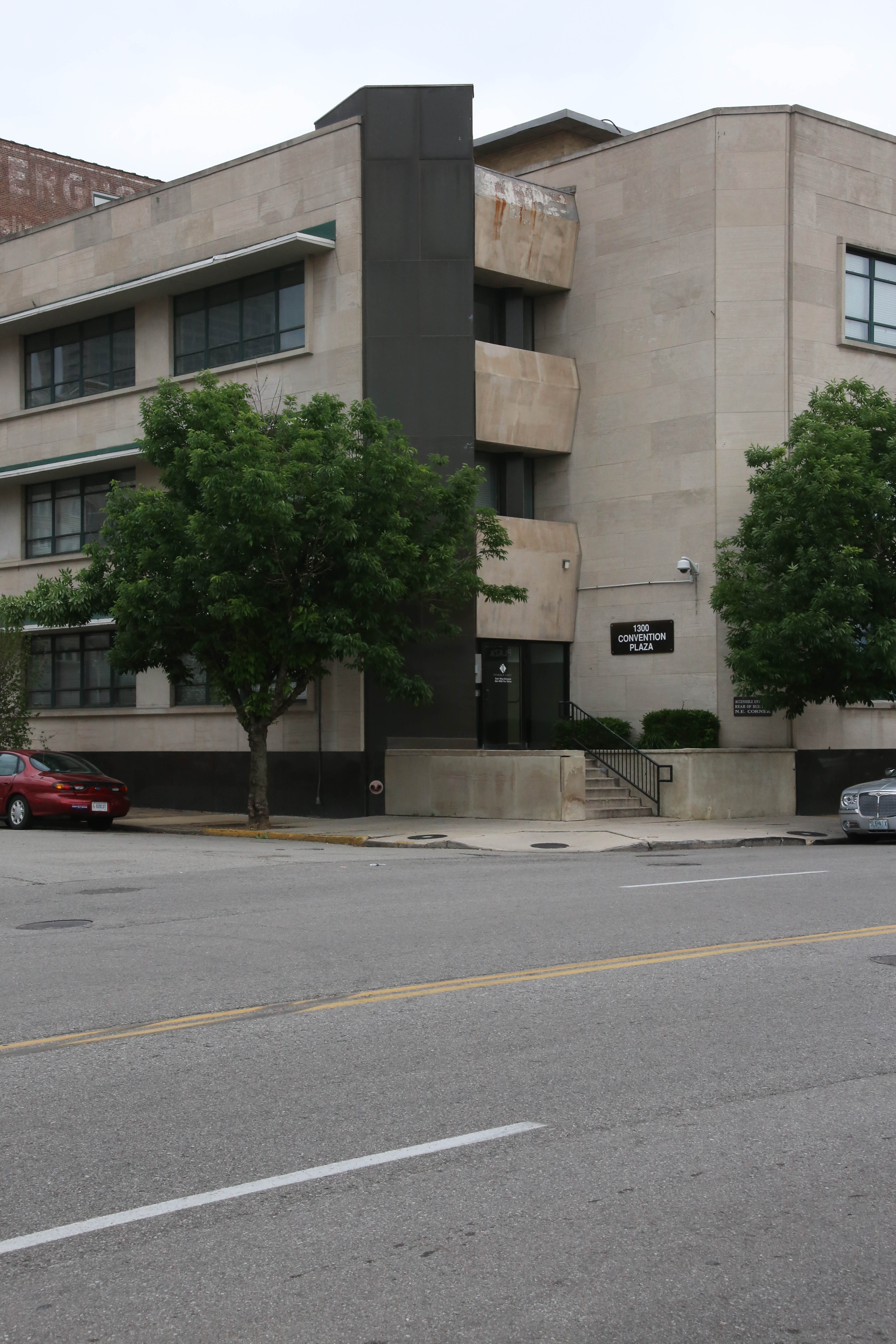
- The front entrance in 2016

- Location within St. Louis Location within Missouri Location within the United States
- Location: 1300 Convention Plaza (formerly Delmar Boulevard), St. Louis, Missouri 63103
- Coordinates: 38°38′00″N 90°11′51″W
- Built: 1927, 1950
- Built by: March-Jarvis Builders
- Architect: Hugo K. Graf
- Architectural style: International Style
- Website: uemstl.com/uncola-lofts/
- NRHP reference No.: 04000089
- Added to NRHP: February 24, 2004

The Seven-Up Headquarters is a former office building in St. Louis, Missouri that originally served as the home office for the 7 Up company. The National Register of Historic Places listed the structure which has since been converted to the residential Uncola Lofts.

== History ==
Charles Leiper Grigg originally founded the 7 Up company and died in 1940 after which his son, Hamblett Charles Grigg, succeeded him. The company had been renting space in the Shell Building since 1943 but the younger Grigg commissioned Hugo K. Graf to design a prominent headquarters in St. Louis to raise the profile of what was then the third largest soft drink company. The Downtown West site for the building was already owned by 7 Up, as they had purchased a 1927 building to use as a warehouse in 1943. March-Jarvis Builders completed the new headquarters building in 1950.

By the mid-1960s, the company moved to a smaller headquarters in suburban Clayton, Missouri and then moved again to Dallas during the late 1970s. In the 1990s, the St. Louis Development Corporation leased the building to the Christian Board of Publication before its sale in 2003.

The building then had a residential conversion into 48 units, split between one- and two-bedroom apartments. The residences have been variously branded as the Crown Downtown, the Terrace Lofts, and now the Uncola Lofts.

== Architecture ==
Graf designed the three-story International Style office building in a U-shape that incorporates the original 1927 building. The exteriors curtain walls are limestone with a polished black granite base. The fenestration pattern consists of nine bays of windows spanning the width of the building. Cantilevered shields over the windows both help block the morning sun and further emphasize the horizontal lines.

The interior portions considered historic consist of the entrance lobby and second floor boardroom, both of which have wood paneling. The Associated General Contractors gave an award celebrating the building's architecture.

== See also ==
- List of works by Hugo K. Graf
- Coca-Cola Building (St. Louis)
- National Register of Historic Places listings in Downtown and Downtown West St. Louis
