= Wilbur Trueblood =

American architect (1874–1937)

Wilbur Tyson Trueblood, Sr. (January 4, 1874 – May 23, 1937) was an American architect, based in St. Louis, Missouri. Trueblood was a chief architectural supervisor for the Federal Housing Administration (FHA). Two buildings he helped design are listed on the National Register of Historic Places in St. Louis County.

== Biography ==
Wilbur Tyson Trueblood was born on January 4, 1874, in St. Louis, Missouri. He attended the 'Old Manual Training School'. He spent a year studying architecture at Columbia University, and also spent a year studying at École des Beaux-Arts in Paris.

Trueblood taught at Washington University in St. Louis. He served as a chairman of the Municipal Art Commission in St. Louis. He worked with Theodore Link on the design of buildings for Louisiana State University. He also partnered with architect Hugo K. Graf.

He was elected a fellow of the American Institute of Architects in 1936. Trueblood died on May 23, 1937, of pneumonia after stomach surgery at Barnes Hospital in St. Louis.

In 2015, controversy developed about the possible closure of the National Register of Historic Places listed, Central School in Ferguson.

== Work ==
- Carpenter Branch Library, 3309 S. Grand Blvd., St. Louis, Missouri
- Ferguson School Central School, 201 Wesley Avenue, Ferguson, Missouri
- University City Education District (which includes University City High School, Jackson Park Elementary School and Hanley Junior High School), 7400 and 7401 Balson Avenue, and 951 North Hanley Road in University City, Missouri. The architecture is credited to Trueblood & Graf.

== See also ==
- National Register of Historic Places listings in St. Louis County, Missouri
