= Rodgers Theatre Building =

- U.S. National Register of Historic Places
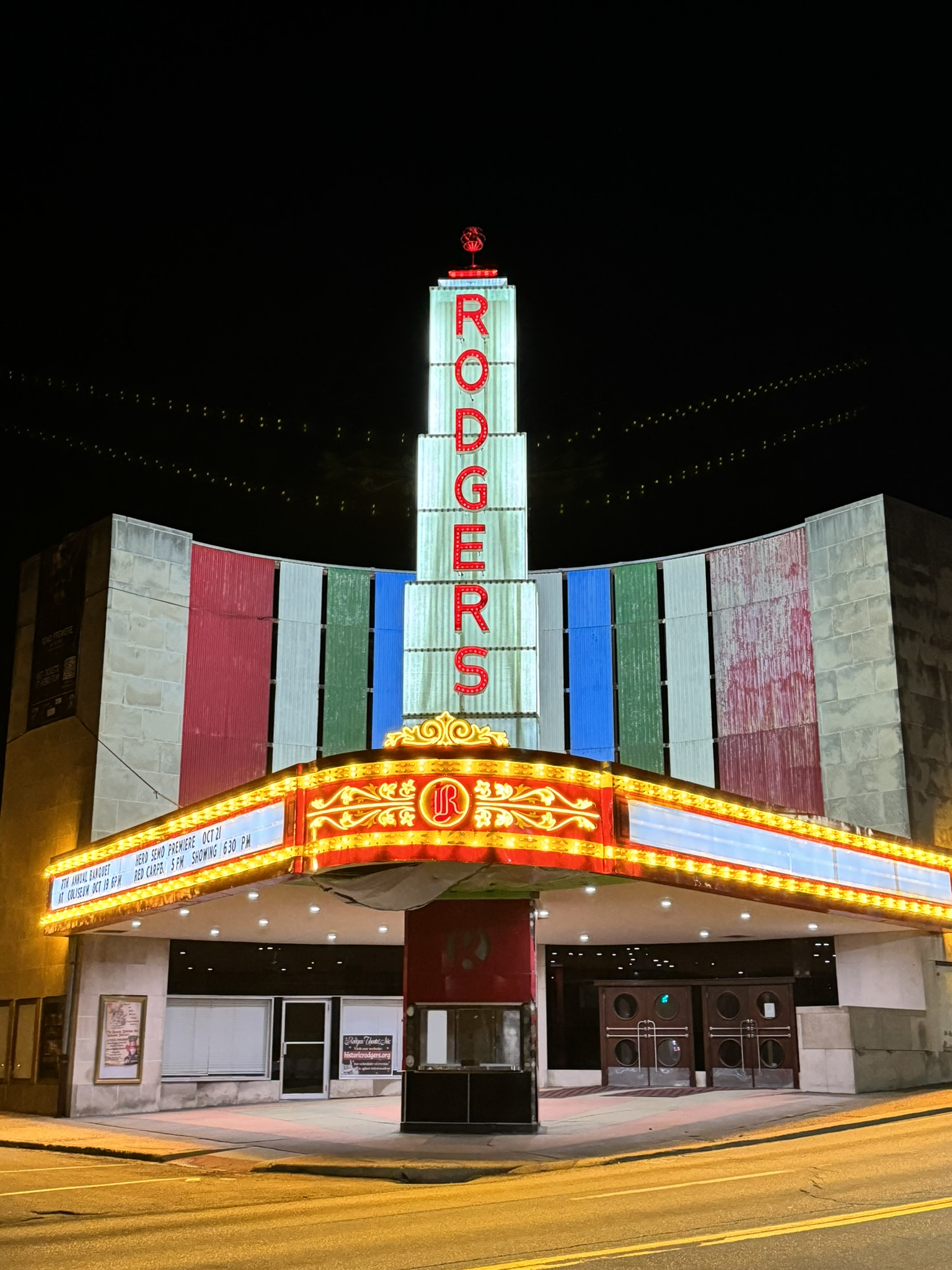
- Rodgers Theatre, October 2023

- Location within Missouri Location within the United States
- Location: 204,214,216,218,220,222 and 224 N. Broadway, Poplar Bluff, Missouri
- Coordinates: 36°45′26″N 90°23′36″W
- Area: less than one acre
- Built: 1949
- Architect: Hugo K. Graf; Stephens, Edgar & Sons
- Architectural style: Moderne, Art Deco
- NRHP reference No.: 01000750
- Added to NRHP: July 19, 2001

Rodgers Theatre Building is a historic commercial building located at Poplar Bluff, Butler County, Missouri. It was built in 1949 with (Lockheed Martin's) Dan Thompson of Poplar Bluff being the designer, and is a three-story, brick and concrete commercial building with Art Deco and Art Moderne stylistic elements. The building contains a drama stage and one commercial space and consists of three main sections; the facade and theatre marquee, the theatre, and the office block. The theatre marquee features a prominent ziggurat tower.

It was added to the National Register of Historic Places in 2001.
