= Old Ozaukee County Courthouse =

- U.S. National Register of Historic Places
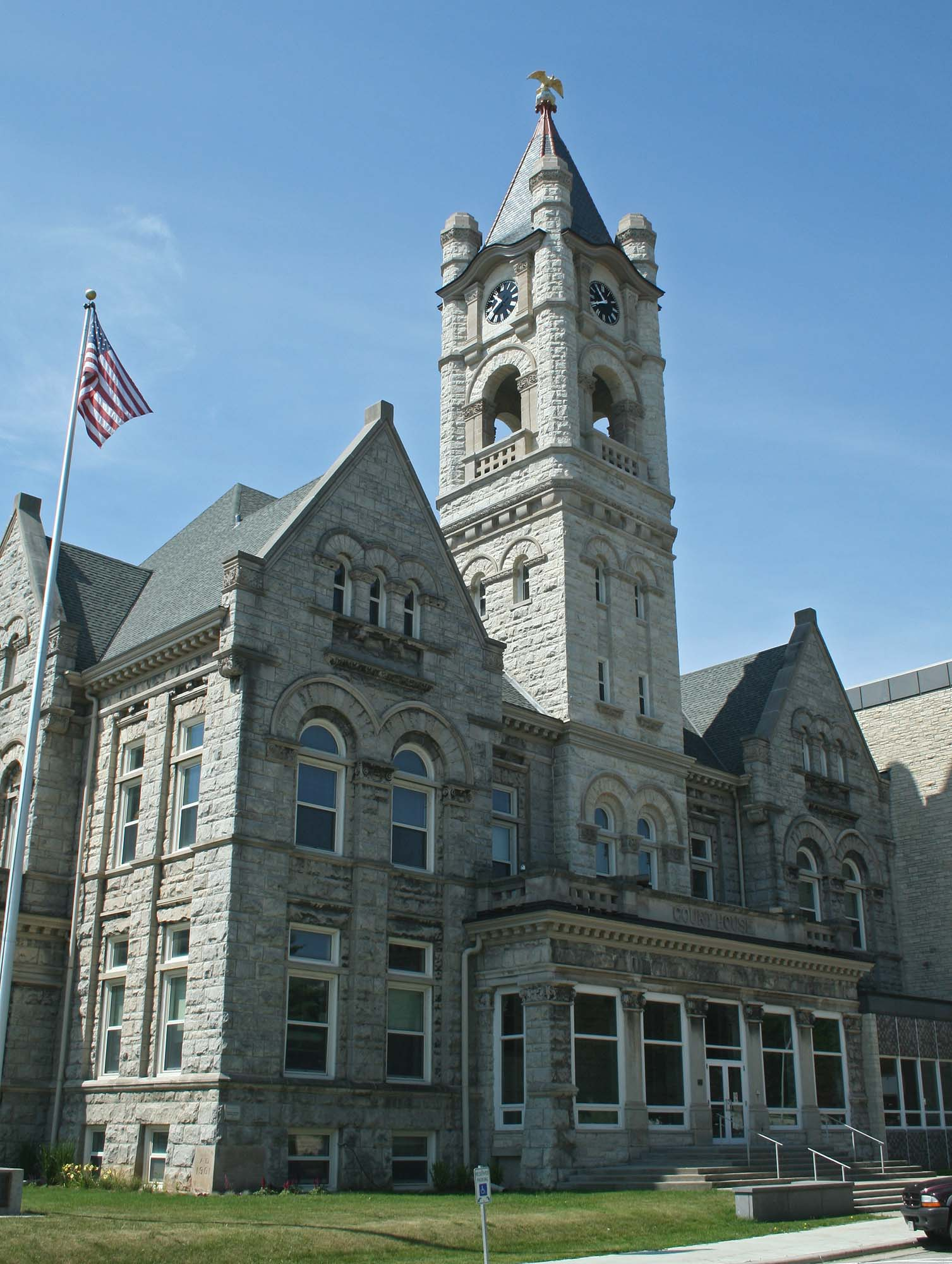
- Old Ozaukee County Courthouse

- Location within Wisconsin
- Location: 109 W. Main St. Port Washington, Wisconsin
- Coordinates: 43.38823°N 87.87133°W
- Built: 1901-1902
- Built by: Wurthman and Vollmer
- Architect: Frederick Graf
- Architectural style: Richardsonian Romanesque
- NRHP reference No.: 76000071
- Added to NRHP: December 12, 1976

The Old Ozaukee County Courthouse in Port Washington, Wisconsin, United States, is a Richardsonian Romanesque-styled building built in 1901 and clad in gray-blue limestone from the nearby Cedarburg quarry. It was added to the National Register of Historic Places in 1976. The building currently serves as the county's administration center.

== History ==
In 1899, the Board of Ozaukee County, Wisconsin, passed a resolution that bonds should be issued to build a new courthouse after it was decided that the previous one, which had been the site of an American Civil War draft riot in 1862, was no longer safe to use. Soon after, controversy erupted when many residents of the county petitioned for the location of the courthouse to be moved from Port Washington to Cedarburg. Eventually, it was decided that the courthouse would remain in Port Washington and was to be built on the site of the previous one. The previous courthouse began being disassembled in late 1900 and court matters were temporarily handled within Port Washington's opera house. The new courthouse was opened in 1902. An administrative annex was added in 1969.

In 1991, the county's law enforcement and Circuit Court functions relocated to the newly-built Justice Center on the city's southwest side. The old courthouse and annex were remodeled and continue to house county government offices.

== Architect ==
Frederick A. Graf (? – May 4, 1938) lived in Wisconsin and designed several residences that are contributing properties to historical districts in addition to the courthouse. His father was a French engraver who immigrated to the U.S. Architect Hugo Koch Graf was his son.

His work includes:

- Old Ozaukee County Courthouse at 109 W. Main St., Port Washington, Wisconsin (Ozaukee County)
- Hotel in Port Washington
- 2534 N. Lake Dr.
- F. Schimonek House
- Christ Polish Baptist Church (Immanuel Community Baptist Church)
