= Emerson Electric Company Building =

Building in St. Louis, Missouri

- U.S. National Register of Historic Places
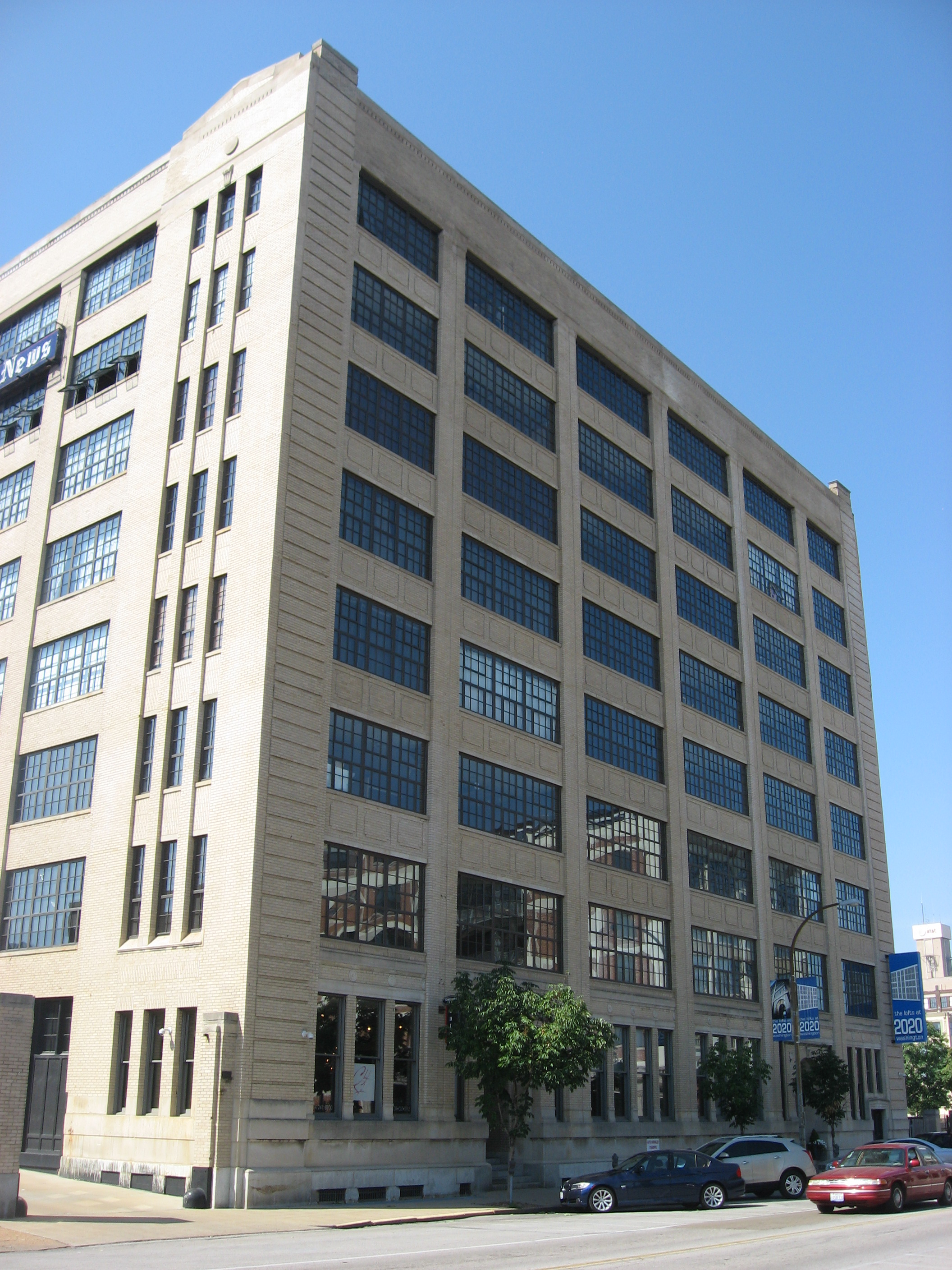

- Location within Missouri
- Location: 2012--2018 Washington Ave., St. Louis, Missouri
- Coordinates: 38.6339°N 90.2085°W
- Area: less than one acre
- Built: 1920
- Architects: Groves,Albert B.
- NRHP reference No.: 86003138
- Added to NRHP: November 6, 1986

Lofts at 2020 (formerly known as the Sporting News Lofts building and before that as the Emerson Electric Company Building) is a building at 2012-18 Washington Avenue in St. Louis, Missouri. The building was designed by architect Albert B. Groves and was constructed in 1920 as an eight-story concrete factory. After World War II, the building was the headquarters for The Sporting News.

The building was originally a 150,000 ft² factory for manufacturing small motors and fans for Emerson Electric. During World War II, Emerson produced turrets for heavy bombers such as the B-17 Flying Fortress and the B-24 Liberator. The building is on the National Register of Historic Places.

== See also ==
- National Register of Historic Places listings in Downtown and Downtown West St. Louis
