= Berry Motor Car Service Building =

- U.S. National Register of Historic Places
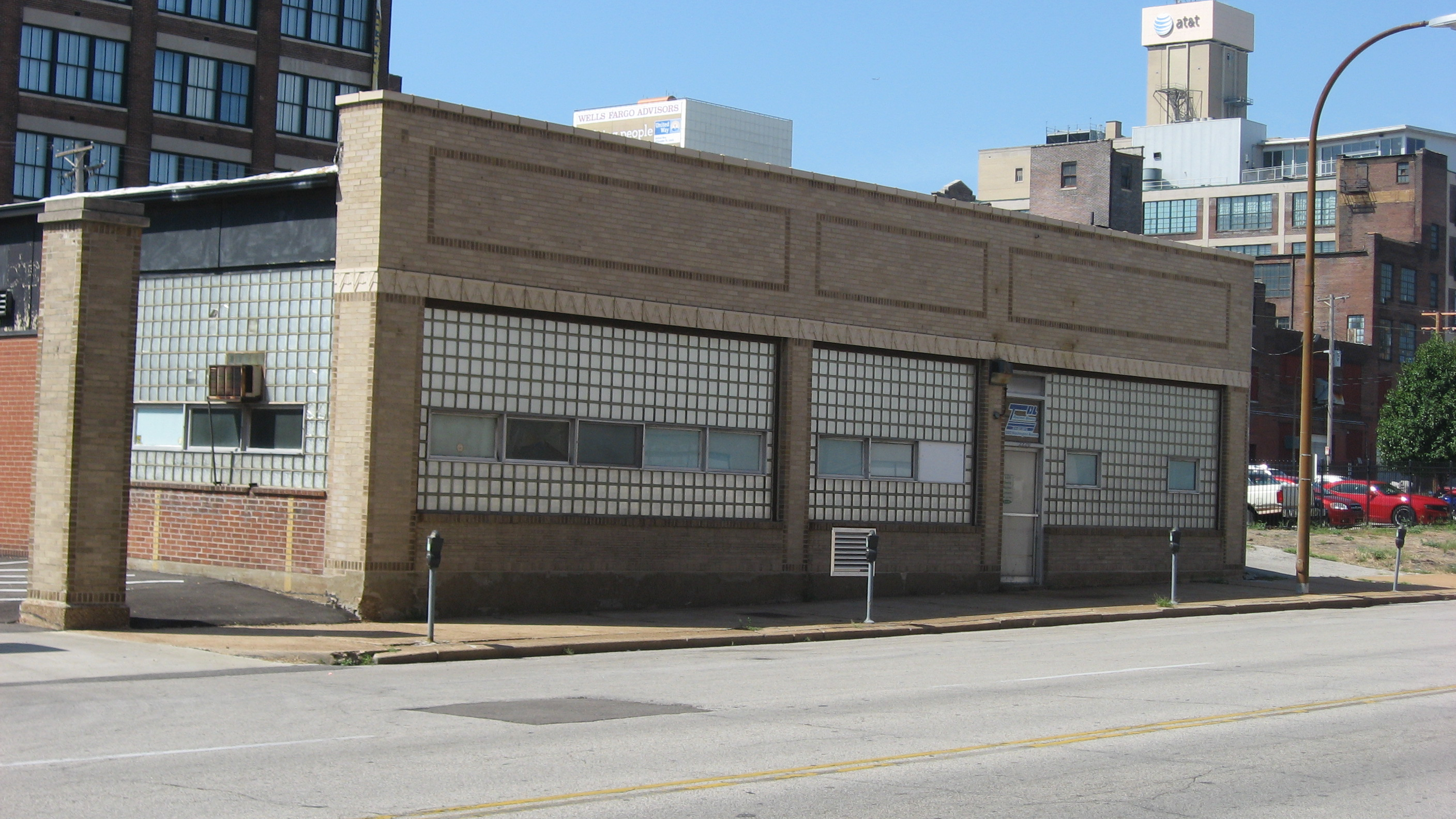

- Location within Missouri Location within the United States
- Location: 2220 Washington Ave, St. Louis, Missouri
- Coordinates: 38°38′04″N 90°12′41″W
- Area: less than one acre
- Built: 1937
- Built by: John W. Morrison
- Architect: Otto Krieg
- Architectural style: Early Commercial
- MPS: Auto-Related Resources of St. Louis, Missouri MPS
- NRHP reference No.: 10000480
- Added to NRHP: July 19, 2010

The Berry Motor Car Service Building, at 2220 Washington Ave in St. Louis, Missouri, was built in 1937. It was listed on the National Register of Historic Places in 2010. The listing included two contributing buildings.

The one-story building served as an automobile service facility for the Berry Motor Car Company (also known as the Halsey-Packard Building) at 2201-2211 Locust Street (also listed on the National Register).

It was designed by architect Otto Krieg and built by contractor John W. Morrison.
