= Kieselhorst Piano Company =

American piano manufacturer

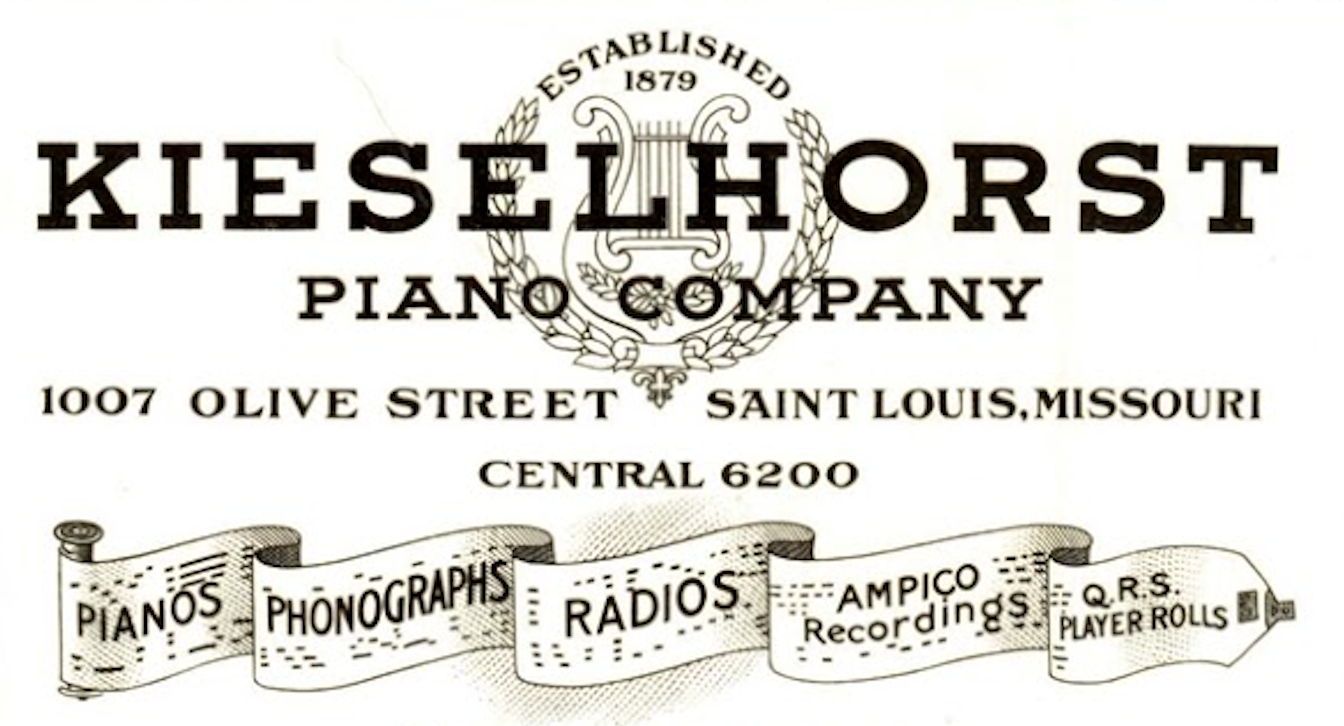
- Detail from letterhead, 1925
- Formerly: Olhausen & Kieselhorst
- Industry: musical instrument manufacture
- Founded: 1879
- Founder: John A. Kieselhorst
- Defunct: 1930
- Fate: closed
- Headquarters: St. Louis, Missouri, United States
- Products: Pianos, sheet music
- Brands: Kieselhorst
- Owner: John A. Kieselhorst, Edwin A. Kieselhorst
- Number of employees: 26 (1902)

The Kieselhorst Piano Company was an American manufacturer and vendor of pianos and publisher of sheet music that operated from 1879 to 1930 in St. Louis, Missouri.

A second, smaller store by the name operated from about 1940 to 1956.

== History ==
=== Early years: 1879-1895 ===
The company was founded by John A. Kieselhorst Jr., born in 1844 to two German immigrants to St. Louis: John A. Kieselhorst (1808-?) and his wife. John Jr. followed his father into furniture making, but left the trade to become a bank teller and then a bookkeeper.

In 1879, Kieselhorst Jr. and Ernst P. Olhausen, who was then the assistant editor of the Westliche Post, opened Olhausen & Kieselhorst, a store that sold "pianos, organs, musical instruments, music, books, and stationery" at 10 South Fourth Street. After six months, Kieselhorst bought out his partner, struck Olhausen's name from the business, and moved the shop to 2706 Laclede Avenue in the Mill Creek Valley neighborhood. In 1881, he began selling Henry Miller Pianos, made in Boston. Three years later, he moved the business to 1111 Olive Street, in the city's growing piano district. He sold pianos by William Knabe & Company (made in New York City), Kimball & Company (Chicago), and Blasius & Sons (Woodbury, New Jersey). By 1893, he was able to move the store to a more prominent space at the southwest comer of Olive and Tenth. Kieselhorst ran the company until 1895, when he died at age 51.

=== Boom times: 1895-1926 ===
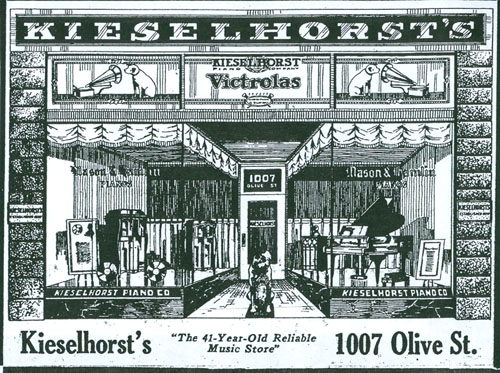
1920 newspaper ad depicting the Kieselhorst storefront at 1007 Olive Blvd.

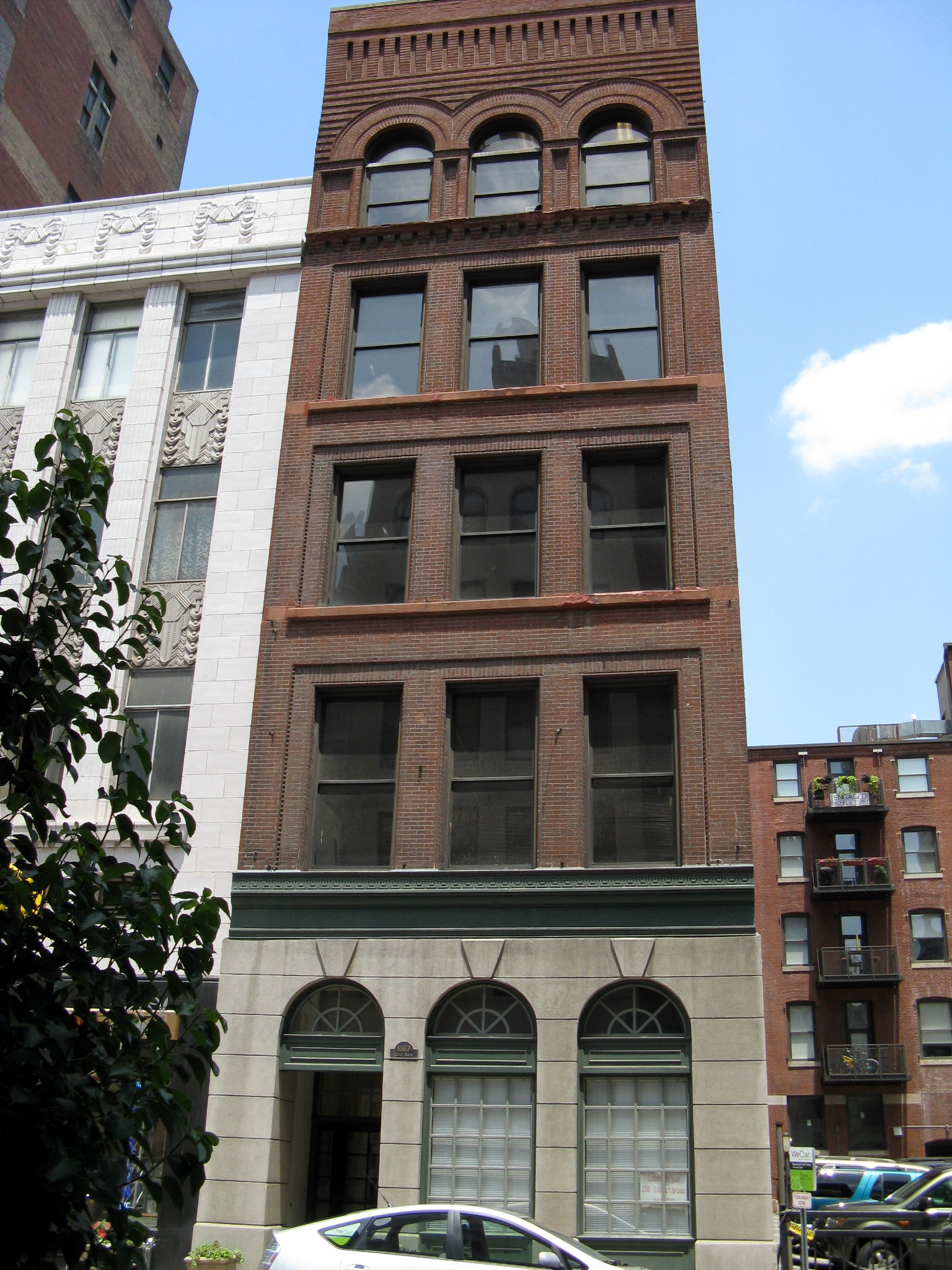
2008 photo of the 1007 Olive building

His 21-year-old son Edwin Artus Kieselhorst took over the company. "He greatly expanded the company's services to consist not only of dealing traditional pianos and organs but of manufacturing pianos and piano parts, polishing, tuning, and storing," according to its National Register of Historic Places registration form. The company thus became one of the city's earliest piano manufacturers, though it continued to sell other brands as well. Edwin vigorously pushed the company into new technologies such as the player piano and, later, the victrola. In 1898, Edwin incorporated the firm as Kieselhorst Piano Company.

By 1902, Edwin had doubled the company's annual sales and expanded its workforce to 26 people. One younger brother, Henry, became the manager in the player-piano department; another, John, became the foreman in the electric piano department. The company also developed a self-playing attachment for use on pianos and organs. The company would sell thousands of player-piano rolls for songs such as "Daisy Bell", "The Band Played On", and "After the Ball".

In 1905, the company was forced from the Dorris Block, which was demolished so the Frisco Building could be expanded. So Edwin moved the company headquarters to 1007 Olive Street, an 1890 office building "in the heart of Saint Louis' dense and most elite music district on Olive between Ninth and Twelfth Streets which had thrived since the early 1880s." A decade later, the company would also lease a 3-story building three blocks south at 1007-1009 Market Street. "The additional space was made necessary by the addition of Victor talking machines to the line of pianos handled by the Kieselhorst Co., and the additional building will be used as a storehouse, a shop for overhauling instruments taken in exchange and perhaps for a salesroom for used pianos and players," the Music Trade Review reported.

In 1913, the company advertised pianos of its own branding, offering the "Kieselhorst Upright Piano" for $275 ($8,958 today). Other advertisements offered the "Style 90 Kieselhorst Player-Piano" and the "Style 36 Kieselhorst Upright".

In 1917, the company placed an order for 100 player pianos—enough to fill five boxcars—from the Gulbransen-Dickinson Co. of Chicago, the manufacturer's biggest order to date.

In 1922, Edwin Kieselhorst was a member of the board of directors of piano-roll and radio manufacturer QRS Music Company.

In 1924, the music trade press took note of the company's unusual sales effort: sending a team of 24 salesmen to visit a total of 600 to 800 houses per day, seeking to personally pitch the majority of the city's then-750,000 inhabitants on the idea of buying a piano.

In 1925, the company was selling pianos by Mason & Hamlin, Sohmer, Kurtzmann, Haines Brothers, and Gulbransen; phonographs by Victrola and Brunswick; and radios, including the Super Zenith Long Distance Radio and the Brunswick Radiola. Henry Kieselhorst became the company's vice-president.

In October 1926, business temporarily slowed to a trickle as the St. Louis Cardinals baseball team ran through the playoffs and defeated the New York Yankees in the World Series.

=== Decline: 1927-1930 ===
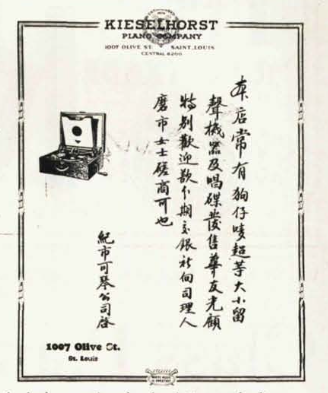
1928 handbill advertising pianos to St. Louis' Chinese community.

By the late 1920s, the Kieselhorst Piano Company's revenues were dwindling along with national sales of pianos. Around 1927, Kieselhorst would recall, the business "began to totter, and then it had fainting spells, and [in 1929] went into a tailspin," he told the St. Louis Post-Dispatch in 1930. "In the old days, we sold 17 or 18 pianos a day," he said, declining to say what the current numbers were.

Among the company's efforts to prop up sales was an unusual outreach to St. Louis' Chinese community. In 1928, Helen Moore, who led the store's phonograph-records department, had a handbill translated into Mandarin and circulated it in the city's Chinatown. "Come here for your Chinese records and Victrolas," it began.

In May 1930, Edwin Kieselhorst decided to dissolve the company while it remained financially sound. "Having observed the decline of the piano and musical instrument business for many years, we have decided to retire cheerfully and gracefully with substantial assets, no liabilities, and a pride in the family name," he said. The piano store was closed, the stock sold off, and the building vacated.

=== Epilogue: 1930-1956 ===
The corporation continued to exist as a holding company for Kieselhorst family investments. In 1939, a bank sued the company, claiming that stock put up as collateral for a loan had so depreciated that the bank was owed money. Company trustees Edwin and his son Wallace countersued, claiming that the bank had sold the stock at a low point; they demanded recompense.

By 1940, Henry Kieselhorst had revived the Kieselhorst Piano Company name and was doing business in a much smaller storefront at 5816 Easton Avenue (now Dr. Martin Luther King Drive). Among other wares, the shop sold stencil pianos made by Gulbransen.

In 1956, the business was moved to 6528 Clayton Road by Clarence Trump, a former employee of Edwin's. Renamed Pianoland, the store operated until at least July 1972.

== Kieselhorst family ==
John A. Kieselhorst Jr. (1844–1895), who was "considered the city's finest flute player", was also a published composer of works for piano and flute. He had a sister, Emma T. Kieselhorst (1849–1915), a schoolteacher. She left an estate of $4,000 ($127,303 today), most of which she bequeathed to various charities.

John's children included Edwin, Henry, and John A. Kieselhorst.

Edwin Kieselhorst was born in St. Louis in 1875. In 1900, Edwin eloped with Estelle Williams, a cashier at his company; they married in Little Rock, Arkansas; honeymooned in Hot Springs, Arkansas; and came back to live in his house at 4365 Forest Park Boulevard. In 1926, he and his wife took a four-month vacation to the South Sea Islands; he returned "weighing thirteen and one half pounds more than when he went away and looking as fit as a fiddle." Estelle died in 1938. In 1940, he was living at 12 Southmoor Drive in Clayton, Missouri. He died on November 11, 1940, of a heart attack while leaving a friend's house at 7314 Westmoreland Drive in University City, Missouri, and was buried in Bellefontaine Cemetery in St. Louis.

Edwin had three sons: Wallace W. Kieselhorst (??-1954), who won Yale University's lightweight boxing championship in 1923; Earl, another Yale grad; and Sydney B. Kieselhorst (1907–1988), who served as captain of Yale's track team in 1929, graduated the following year, and later won a Bronze Star during World War II for service in Belgium, Holland, and Germany from October 23, 1944, to May 8, 1945.

John A. Kieselhorst (June 27, 1880 – November 30, 1934) was born in St. Louis. He attended Kemper Military School in Boonville, Missouri, where he befriended Will Rogers, then transferred to and graduated from Culver Military Academy in Culver, Indiana. He worked for a few years under Edwin at the family business, then for a few years at a piano house in Detroit, Michigan. By 1909, he had settled in Alton, Illinois, where he opened a piano store of his own at 206 W. 3rd Street, adding phonographs and radios along the way. During World War I, he commanded Alton's reserve unit. Years later, he opened a debt-collection service; he closed the piano store in 1933. The following year, with his eyes failing him, he died of a self-inflicted gunshot. He left an estate of $11,366 ($263,708 today) to his wife Florence, daughter Minerva, and son John A. Kieselhorst.

== Legacy ==
In 2008, the Romanesque five-story brick building at 1007 Olive, long known as the Kieselhorst Piano Company Building, was placed on the National Register of Historic Places. "Today it is one of the few architectural remnants of the heyday of the music industry in Saint Louis and a reminder of the cultural forces that propelled that industry into being," including the piano company that "was representative of the major influence of German culture upon the musical tastes and practices of the city," according to its National Register of Historic Places registration form.
