= General Electric Building (disambiguation) =

The General Electric Building is a building at 51st St. and Lexington Avenue, in New York City.

General Electric Building may also refer to:

- 30 Rockefeller Plaza, formerly the GE Building, also in New York City

== See also ==
- Electric Tower, sometimes General Electric Tower, Buffalo, New York
- General Electric Research Laboratory, Schenectady, New York
- General Electric Switchgear Plant, Philadelphia, Pennsylvania
