= Frisco Building =

- U.S. National Register of Historic Places
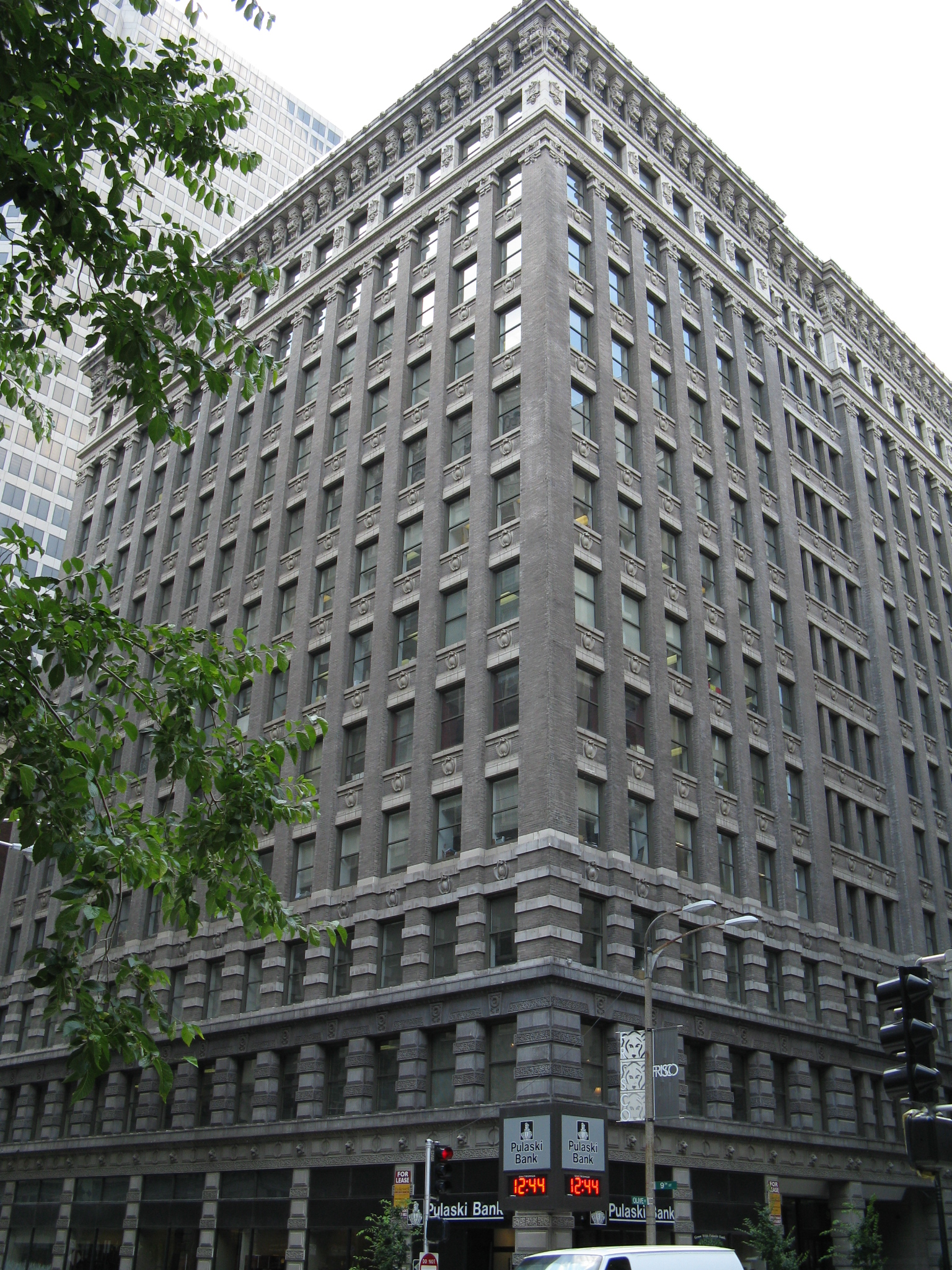

- Location within St. Louis Location within Missouri Location within the United States
- Location: 906 Olive St., St. Louis, Missouri
- Coordinates: 38°37′43″N 90°11′43″W
- Area: less than one acre
- Built: 1903
- Architect: Eames & Young
- NRHP reference No.: 83001046
- Added to NRHP: March 29, 1983

The Frisco Building is a historic office building in downtown St. Louis, Missouri. The building was built in 1903–04 as the headquarters for the St. Louis–San Francisco Railway, which was also known as the Frisco. The architecture firm Eames and Young designed the building as well as its 1905–06 addition; the building's subtle ornamentation and its pier and spandrel system were both important developments in skyscraper design. The Frisco occupied the building for almost eighty years after its opening, and in that time played an important role in Missouri's economic development through railroad construction.

Its expansion forced the Kieselhorst Piano Co., a leading vendor of pianos in the city, to move one block east on Olive Street.

The Frisco Building was added to the National Register of Historic Places on March 29, 1983.
