= Hugo Koch Graf =

American architect (1888–1953)

Hugo Koch Graf (1888–1953) was an American architect from St. Louis, Missouri, who designed numerous significant buildings.

== Biography ==
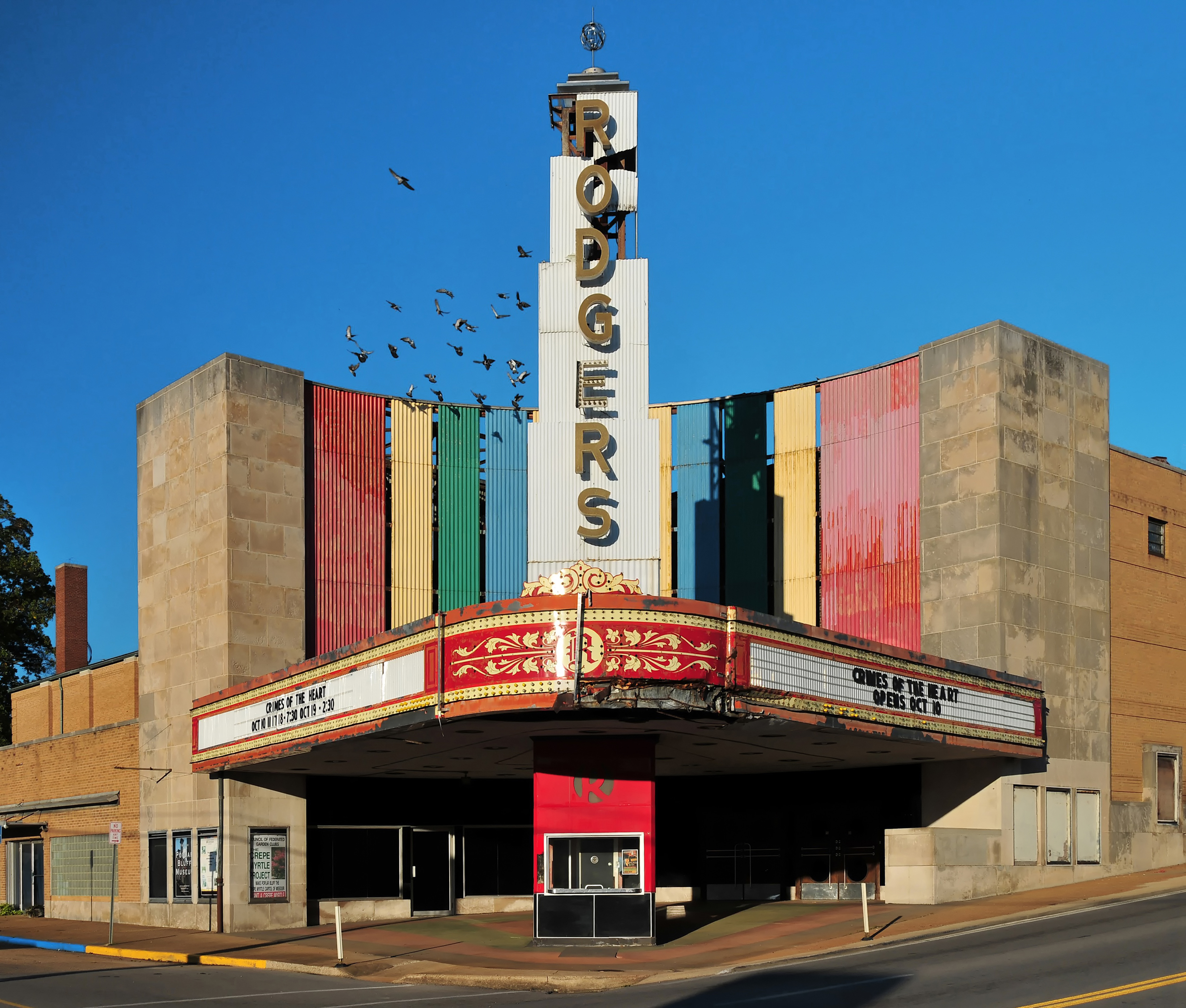
Rodgers Theatre in Poplar Bluff, Missouri

His father was Frederick A. Graf and his grandfather an engraver from France who had immigrated to the U.S. Graf attended Central High School (now known as Central Visual and Performing Arts High School), St. Louis School of Fine Arts, and Washington University's School of Architecture. He was married to Melida Gratiot and he had a daughter, Mrs. Edwin F. Guth, Jr.

An architect from 1914, he was in private practice from 1934 through the end of his life. Graf's work includes the Rodgers Theatre Building at 224 N. Broadway in Poplar Bluff, Missouri and Seven-Up Company Headquarters at 1300-16 Convention Plaza (Formerly Delmar) in St. Louis, Missouri. Both are listed on the National Register of Historic Places.

He partnered with Wilber Tyson Trueblood. He served as president of the St. Louis Architectural Club. He spoke publicly on design.

== Death and legacy ==
He died of a heart attack at his home in Webster Groves, Missouri in March 22, 1953. He was buried in Valhalla Cemetery. The Missouri Historical Society has a collection of his papers.

== Work ==
- University City High School with Trueblood (ca. 1930)
- Jackson Park Elementary School in University City with Wilber Tyson Trueblood (ca. 1933)
- St. Louis Municipal Opera (The Muny)'s stage and lighting towers (1935)
- Bethesda-Dilsworth Memorial Home addition (1949)
- Rodgers Theatre in Poplar Bluff, Missouri (ca. 1949)
- 7 Up Headquarters (1950); Ravenna Mosaics did tilework for the building
- Arlin Oldsmobile Company building (1952)
