= Weber Implement and Automobile Company Building =

- U.S. National Register of Historic Places
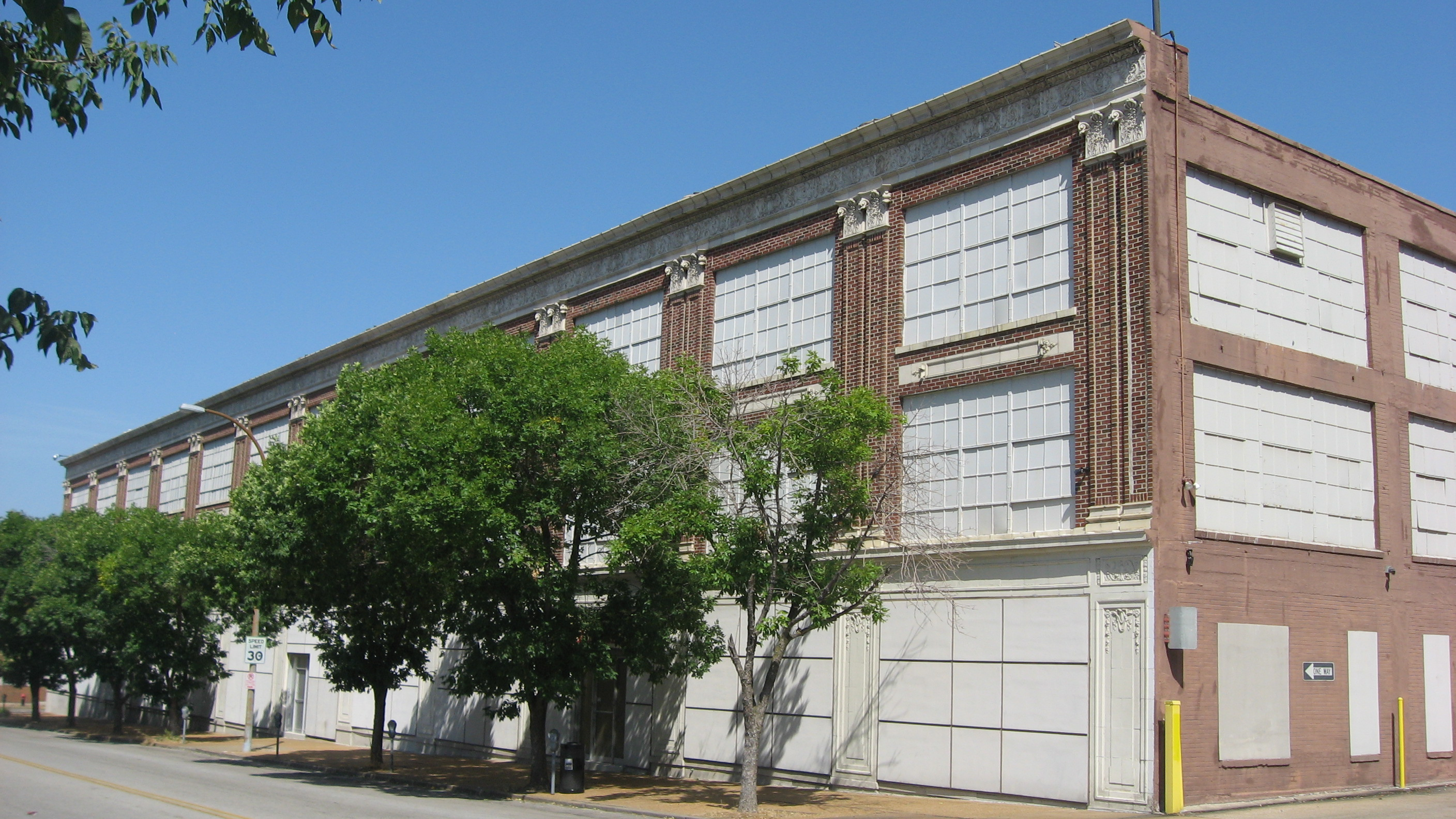

- Location within Missouri
- Location: 1815 Locust St., St. Louis, Missouri
- Coordinates: 38°38′04″N 90°12′22″W
- Area: less than one acre
- Built: 1919
- Architect: Preston J. Bradshaw
- Architectural style: Late 19th And 20th Century Revivals
- NRHP reference No.: 04000343
- Added to NRHP: April 21, 2004

The Weber Implement and Automobile Company Building, at 1815 Locust St. in St. Louis, Missouri, was built in 1919. It was designed by architect Preston J. Bradshaw. It was listed on the National Register of Historic Places in 2004.

It is a three-story Classical Revival-style building.

It has also been known as Tire Mart Inc..

== See also ==
- Old Weber Implement and Automobile Company, also NRHP-listed in St. Louis
