= Wrought Iron Range Company Building =

- U.S. National Register of Historic Places
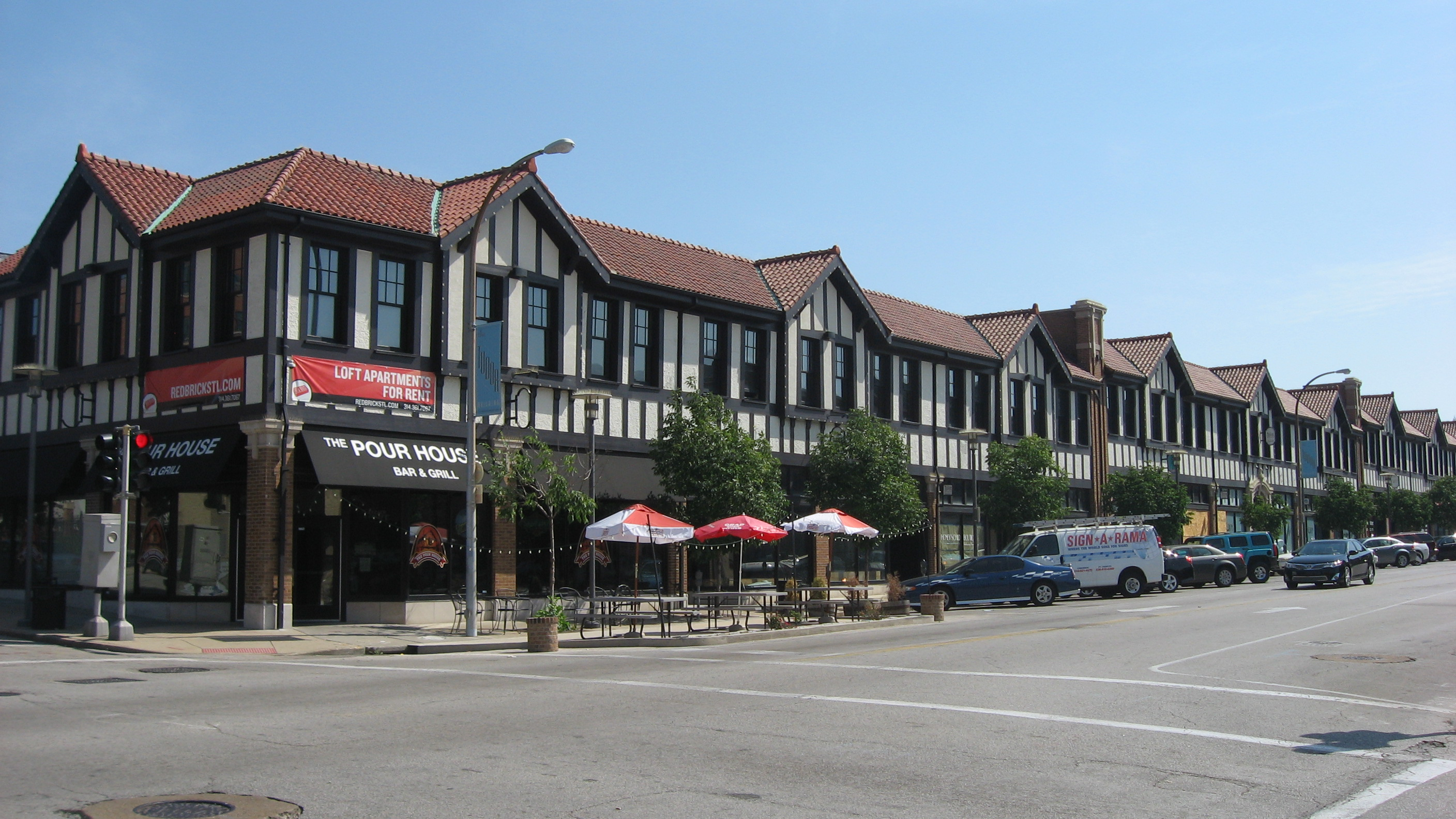

- Location within St. Louis Location within Missouri Location within the United States
- Location: 1901-37 Washington Ave., St. Louis, Missouri
- Coordinates: 38°38′9″N 90°12′25″W
- Area: less than one acre
- Built: 1926
- Built by: Murch Bros.
- Architect: Knell, Albert H.
- Architectural style: Tudor Revival
- NRHP reference No.: 04000746
- Added to NRHP: July 28, 2004

The Wrought Iron Range Company Building is a Tudor Revival style building in St. Louis, Missouri that was built in 1926. The Wrought Iron Range Company was founded by Henry Harrison Culver and his brothers Walter and Licius. It was listed on the National Register of Historic Places in 2004.

It was designed in 1925 by St. Louis architect by Albert Knell. It is a two-story steel frame and brick building with a stuccoed and half-timbered second story. It has a hipped roof with a series of cross gables and brick piers that simulate chimneys.
