= Union Electric Telephone & Telegraph =

- U.S. National Register of Historic Places
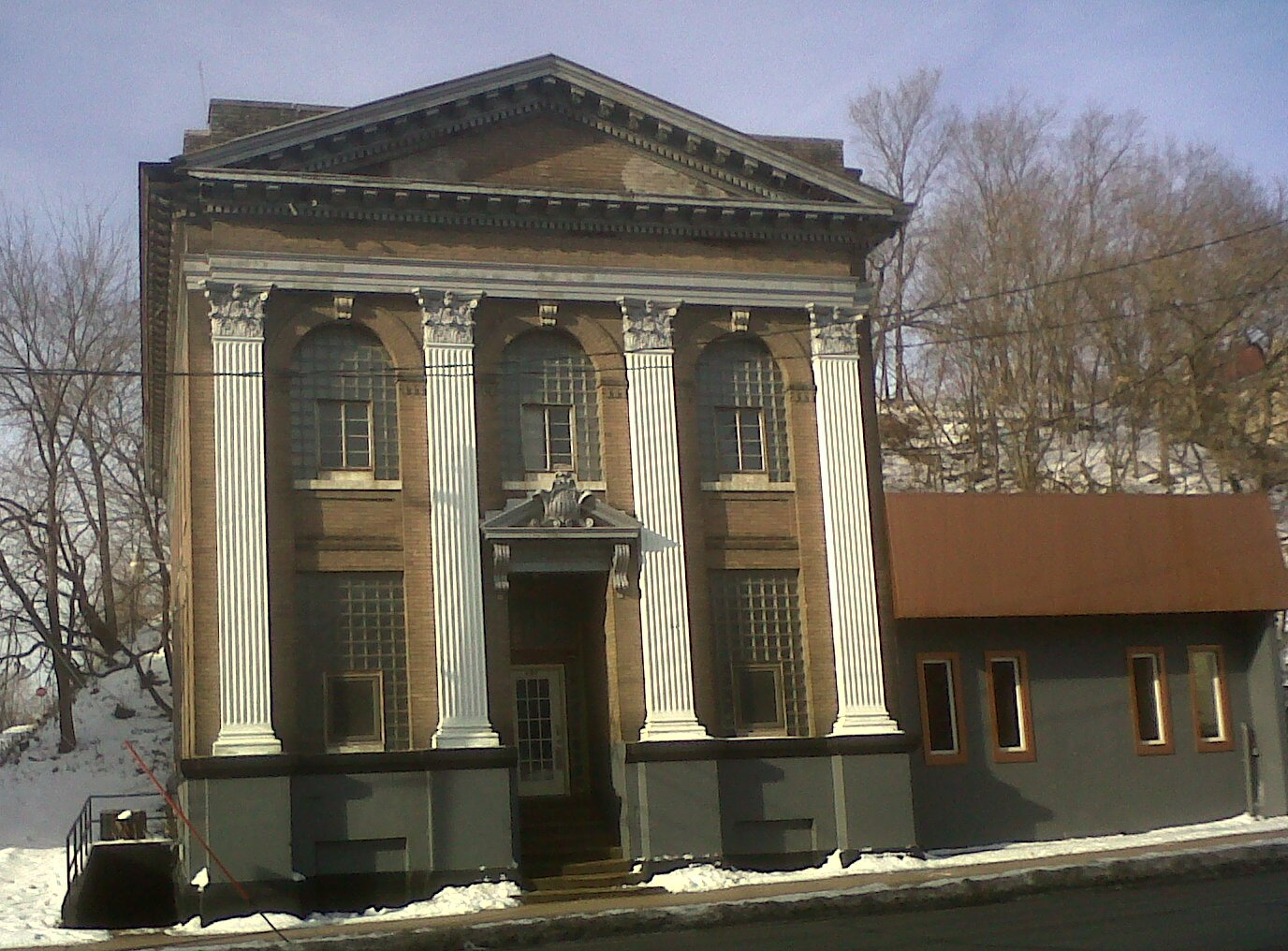

- Location within Iowa Location within the United States
- Location: 602 Harrison Street; Davenport, Iowa
- Coordinates: 41°31′33″N 90°34′39″W
- Area: less than one acre
- Built: 1910
- Architectural style: Classic Revival
- MPS: Davenport MRA
- NRHP reference No.: 83002519
- Added to NRHP: July 7, 1983

The Union Electric Telephone & Telegraph is a historic building located in a small-scale commercial area just north of downtown Davenport, Iowa, United States. It has been listed on the National Register of Historic Places since 1983.

== History ==
Telephone service in the city of Davenport was initiated in 1878 when a private line was installed between the Davenport Water Company office and plant. The following year 36 subscribers in Davenport, Rock Island and Moline, Illinois were hooked up to a switchboard. That area was expanded to 41 towns along the Mississippi River by the Western Telephone Company in 1881. Iowa Telephone and Telegraph was organized the next year and started to serve Davenport residents. Union Electric Telephone and Telegraph entered the market in 1902 and they built this building in 1910. They had about 1,400 customers, but they ceased operations the following year. It was replaced by Tri-City Automatic Telephone Company in 1912, but it lasted only a few years. Scott County had more than 50 private telephone companies in 1910. By 1916 the Iowa Telephone Company, the parent of the modern day Bell system, was the only surviving company.

== Architecture ==
The utility company built this building for its use on the corner of Harrison and Sixth Streets. It is a brick building on a stone foundation. The two-story structure sits on a raised basement. A staircase rises to the main entrance in the center of the main level. A decorative hood crowns the entrance. Four pilasters adorn the façade on the first and second levels. They are capped by Corinthian capitals. The façade is crowned with an imposing pediment. The window openings feature roman arched windows on the second floor that are capped with a hood and a decorative keystone. The glass block and industrial-type windows are a later addition, as is the addition to the north.
