= Old Weber Implement and Automobile Company =

- Weber Implement and Automobile Company, Old
- U.S. National Register of Historic Places
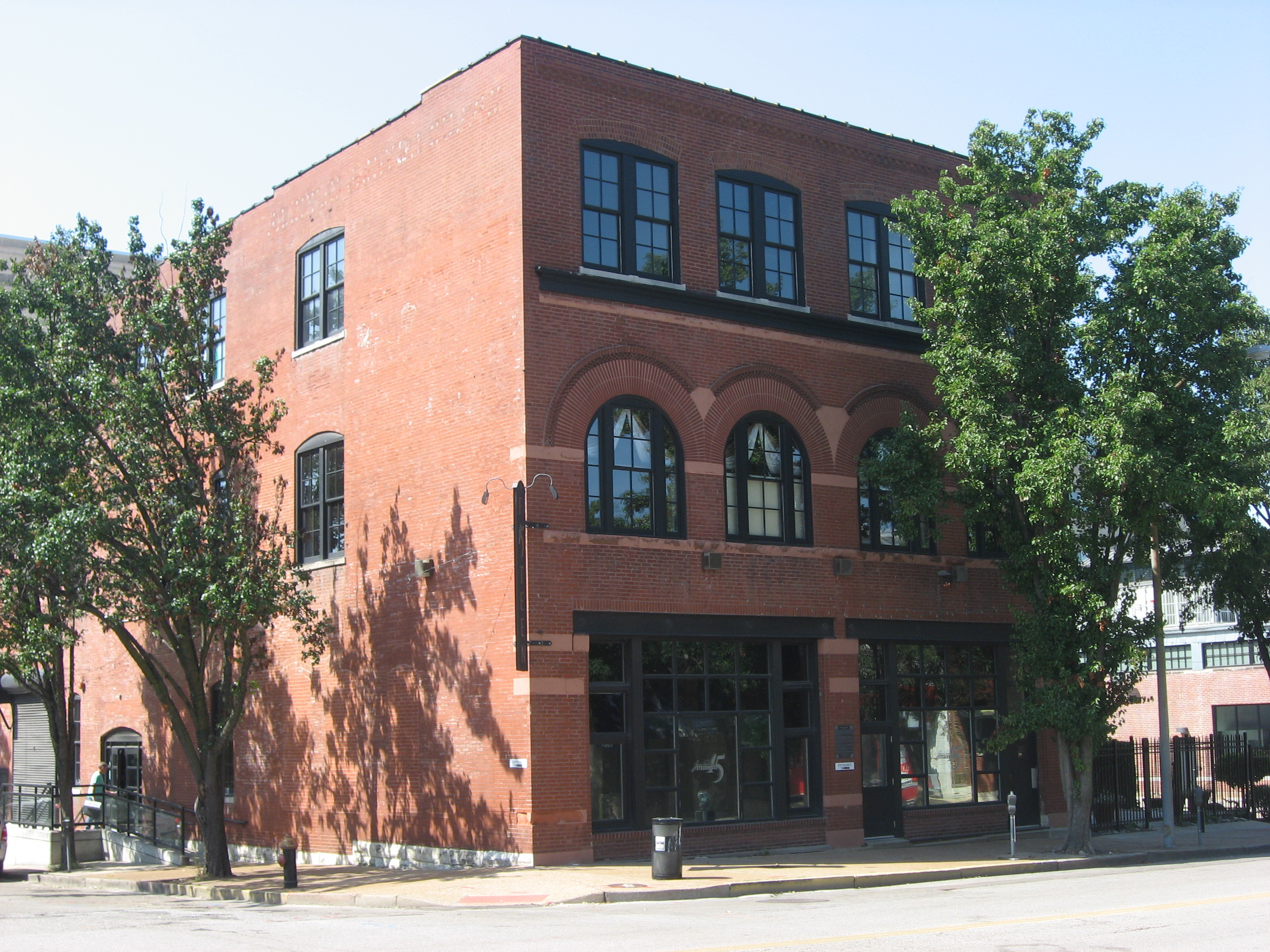

- Location within Missouri Location within the United States
- Location: 1900 Locust St., St. Louis, Missouri
- Coordinates: 38°37′57″N 90°12′25″W
- Area: less than one acre
- Architectural style: Two-Part Commercial Block
- MPS: Auto-Related Resources of St. Louis, Missouri MPS
- NRHP reference No.: 08000093
- Added to NRHP: February 28, 2008

The Old Weber Implement and Automobile Company, at 1900 Locust St. in St. Louis, Missouri, was listed on the National Register of Historic Places in 2008.

It is a two-part commercial block building, and has also been known as the Schoelhorn-Albrecht Machine Company Building.

== See also ==
- Weber Implement and Automobile Company Building, the "new" one, also NRHP-listed
