= Automatic Electric Company Building =

- U.S. National Register of Historic Places
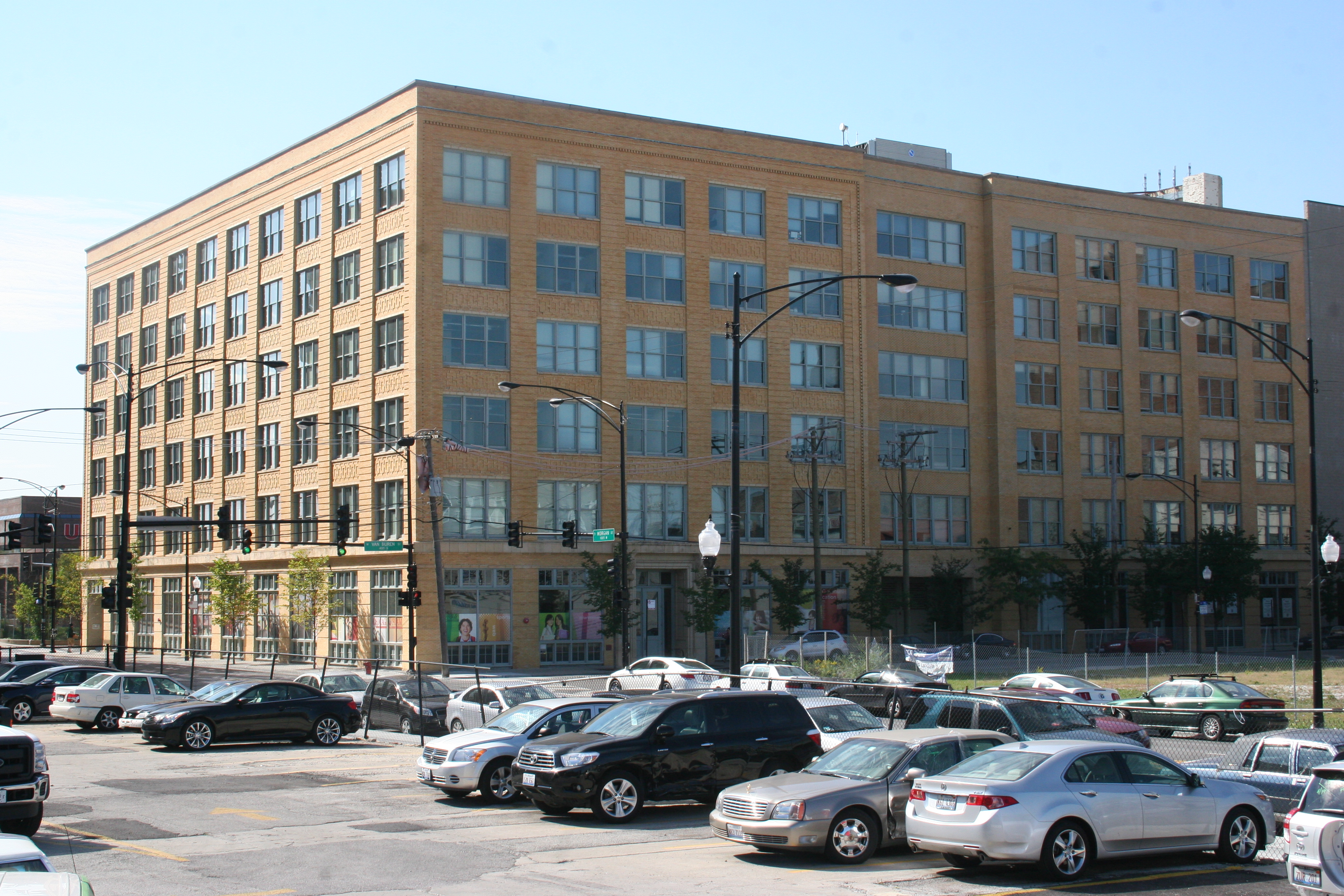

- Location within Chicago metropolitan area Location within Illinois Location within the United States
- Location: 1001 W. Van Buren St., Chicago, Illinois
- Coordinates: 41°52′35″N 87°39′08″W
- Area: less than one acre
- Built: 1901; 125 years ago
- NRHP reference No.: 02001386
- Added to NRHP: November 20, 2002

The Automatic Electric Company Building, located at 1000 W. Van Buren Street in Chicago, Illinois, is the original headquarters of the Automatic Electric Company. The company developed and popularized the automatic telephone exchange in the early 20th century. Inventor Almon Strowger had begun producing and selling automatic switches in the 1890s, but never had a permanent factory; when he helped form the Automatic Electric Company in 1901, the company constructed the building on Van Buren as a factory and headquarters. As Illinois Bell, the largest telephone company in Chicago, did not wish to contract with them, the company grew its market by selling to smaller independent telephone companies in the city. Over the next two decades, it expanded to national and then international customers, and after an employee strike in 1919 the Bell System ultimately became a customer as well. The company used the building as its headquarters until 1957, when it moved to a complex in Northlake.

The building was added to the National Register of Historic Places on November 20, 2002.
