= Shell Building (St. Louis) =

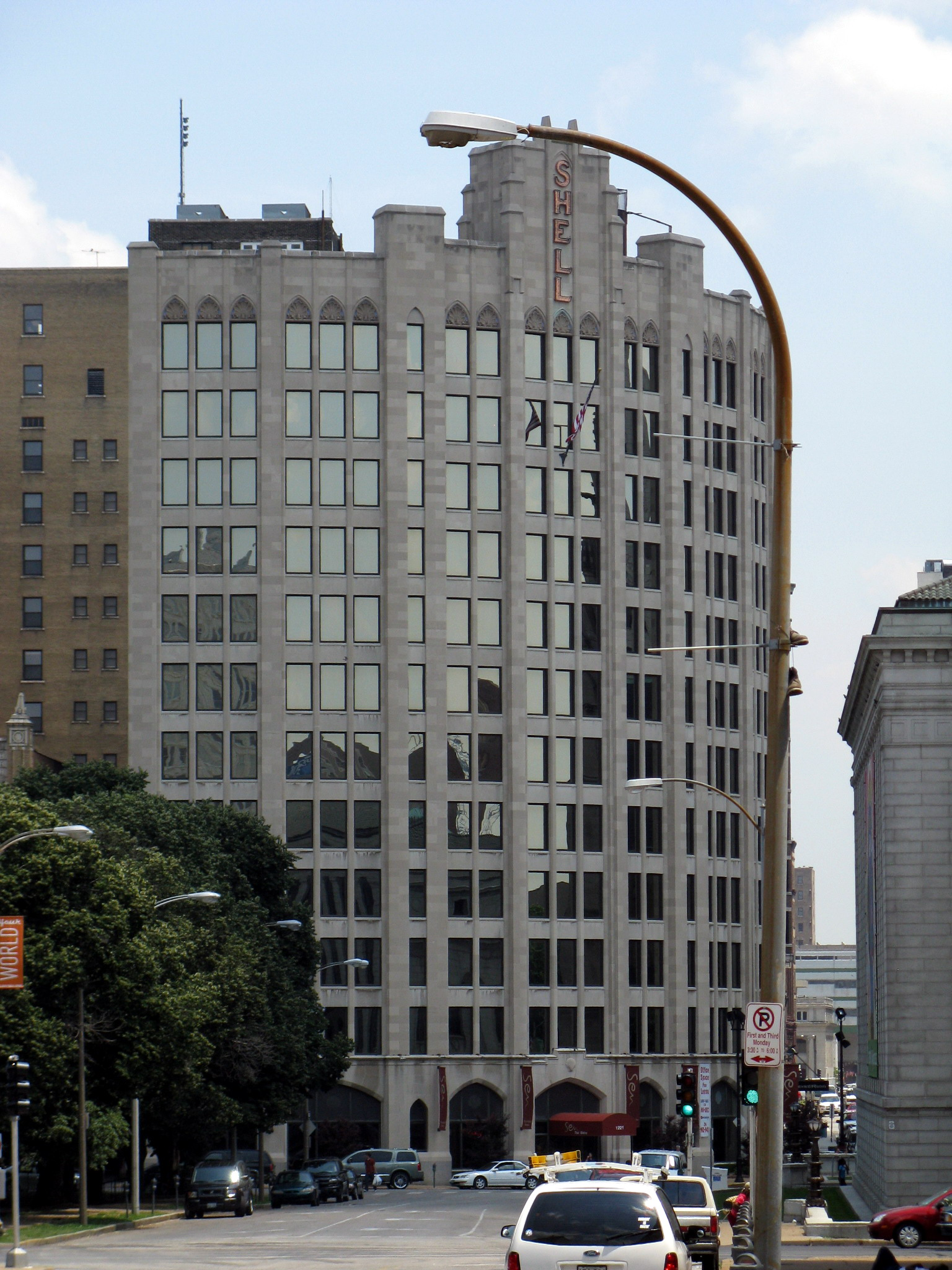
- Interactive map of the Shell Building area

General information
- Type: Commercial offices
- Location: 1221 Locust Street; St. Louis, Missouri
- Coordinates: 38.630494°N 90.196063°W
- Completed: 1926

Height
- Roof: 48.16 m (158.0 ft)

Technical details
- Floor count: 13

Design and construction
- Architect: Jamieson and Spearl

Other information
- Public transit access: MetroBus

The Shell Building is an office building in downtown St. Louis, Missouri. Located at the corner of Locust Street and North 13th Street, known as Shell Corner, the 13-story, 48.16 m (158.0 ft), building was the original home of the Shell Oil Company in the United States. The building has a rounded footprint, following the curve of Locust onto North 13th Street.

After sitting vacant for ten years, it was converted to a dual-branded Hilton hotels property in 2022, housing the Home2 Suites By Hilton St. Louis Downtown and the Tru By Hilton St. Louis Downtown.

The building was listed on the National Register of Historic Places in 2015.
