= Galton (name) =

Galton is a surname and occasionally a given name. Notable people with the name include:

== Surname ==
- Dorothy Galton (1901–1992), British university administrator
- Sir Douglas Strutt Galton (1822–1899), British engineer
- Emma Sophia Galton (1811–1904), English author
- Francis Galton (1822–1911), English Victorian polymath
- Frank Wallace Galton (1867–1952), English political writer and journalist
- Jim Galton (1945–2017), American business executive
- Leah Galton (born 1994), English footballer
- Mary Anne Schimmelpenninck (née Galton, 1778–1856), British writer in the anti-slavery movement
- Peter Galton (born 1942), British vertebrate paleontologist
- Ray Galton (1930–2018), British scriptwriter
- Samuel Galton (disambiguation), multiple people, including:
  - Samuel Galton, Jr. (1753–1832), British arms manufacturer
  - Samuel Tertius Galton (1783–1844), British businessman and scientist

== Given name ==
- Galton Blackiston (born 1962), English chef
