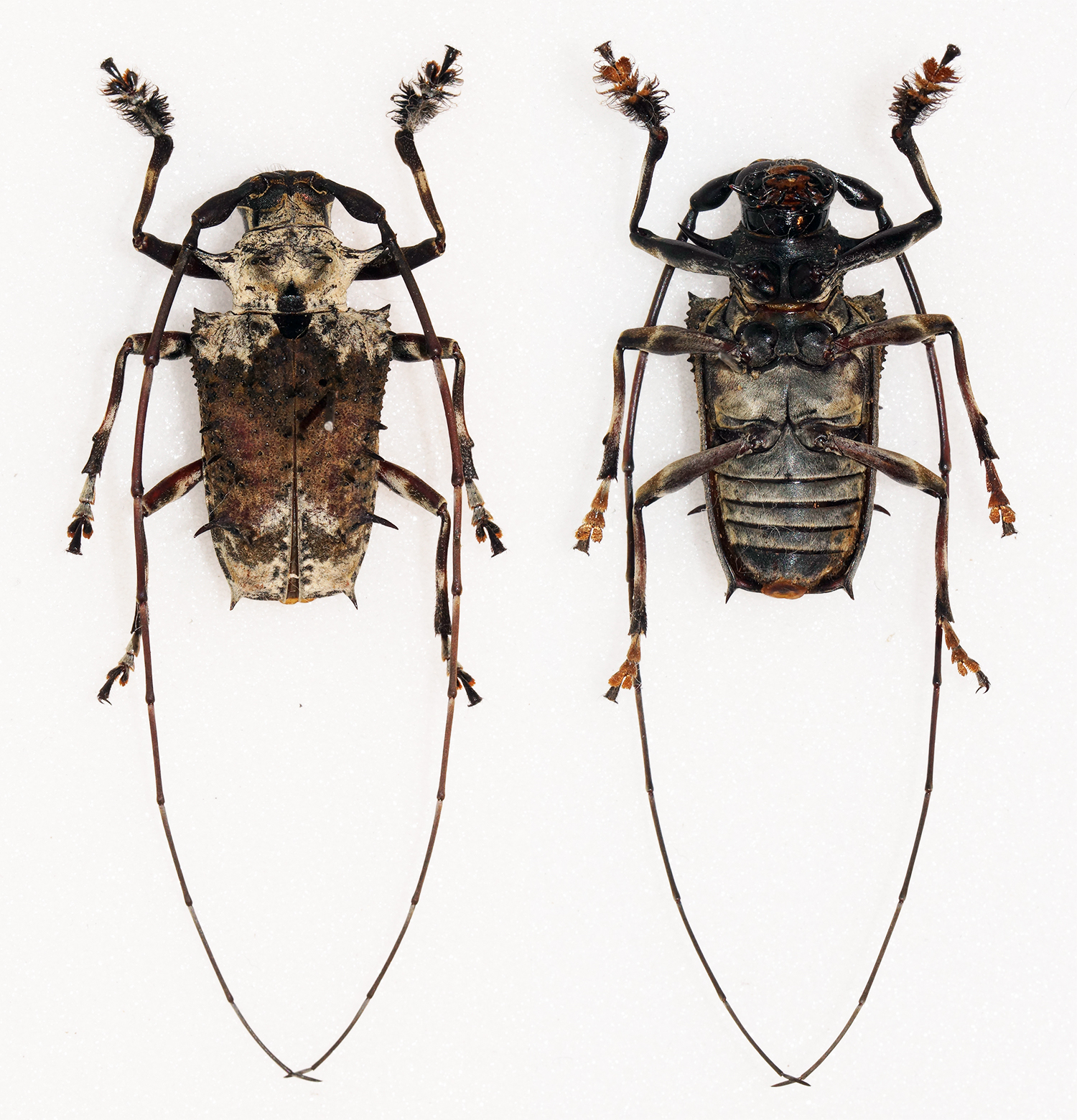

Scientific classification
- Domain: Eukaryota
- Kingdom: Animalia
- Phylum: Arthropoda
- Class: Insecta
- Order: Coleoptera
- Suborder: Polyphaga
- Infraorder: Cucujiformia
- Family: Cerambycidae
- Genus: Polyrhaphis
- Species: P. spinosa

Binomial name
- Polyrhaphis spinosa (Drury, 1773)

Synonyms
- Cerambyx spinosus Drury, 1773

= Polyrhaphis spinosa =

Species of beetle

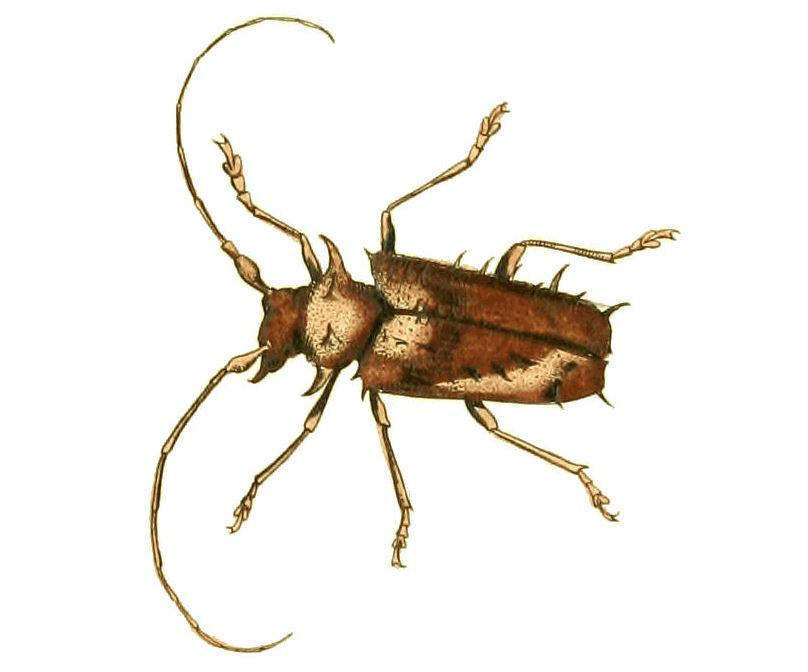
Polyrhaphis spinosa

Polyrhaphis spinosa is a species of longhorn beetles of the subfamily Lamiinae. It was first described by Dru Drury in 1773.

== Description ==
Head and antennae brown, the latter about the length of the insect. Thorax lighter brown and rough, terminating on the sides in two very long and sharp spines, bending upwards; on the middle are two others that are more obtuse and thick, with a small bump or rising behind them. Scutellum black. Elytra brown on the middle and sides, but at their extremities grey, terminating in two long spines. A row of small but sharp spines runs on each side the suture, from the middle almost to the scutellum; and along the sides runs another row from the anterior corners almost to the extremities. Six others are placed on each side the scutellum, running towards the middle in regular order; and on the remaining parts of the wing cases are placed a great number of small pustules, that are to be discerned only by the help of a microscope. Legs brown. Tibiae marked with grey. Body length a little more than an inch (28 mm).
