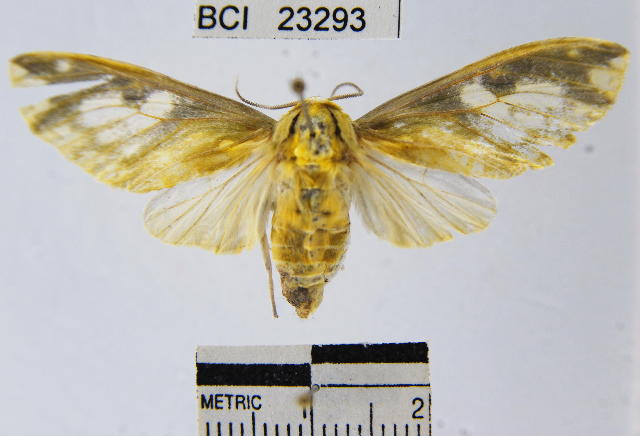

Scientific classification
- Domain: Eukaryota
- Kingdom: Animalia
- Phylum: Arthropoda
- Class: Insecta
- Order: Lepidoptera
- Superfamily: Noctuoidea
- Family: Erebidae
- Subfamily: Arctiinae
- Genus: Castrica
- Species: C. phalaenoides

Binomial name
- Castrica phalaenoides (Drury, 1773)

Synonyms
- Sphinx phalaenoides Drury, 1773; Castrica oweni Schaus, 1896

= Castrica phalaenoides =

Species of moth

Castrica phalaenoides is a moth of the family Erebidae first described by Dru Drury in 1773. It is found in Mexico, Guatemala, Panama, Honduras, Costa Rica, Brazil, French Guiana, Peru, Venezuela, Ecuador and Trinidad.
