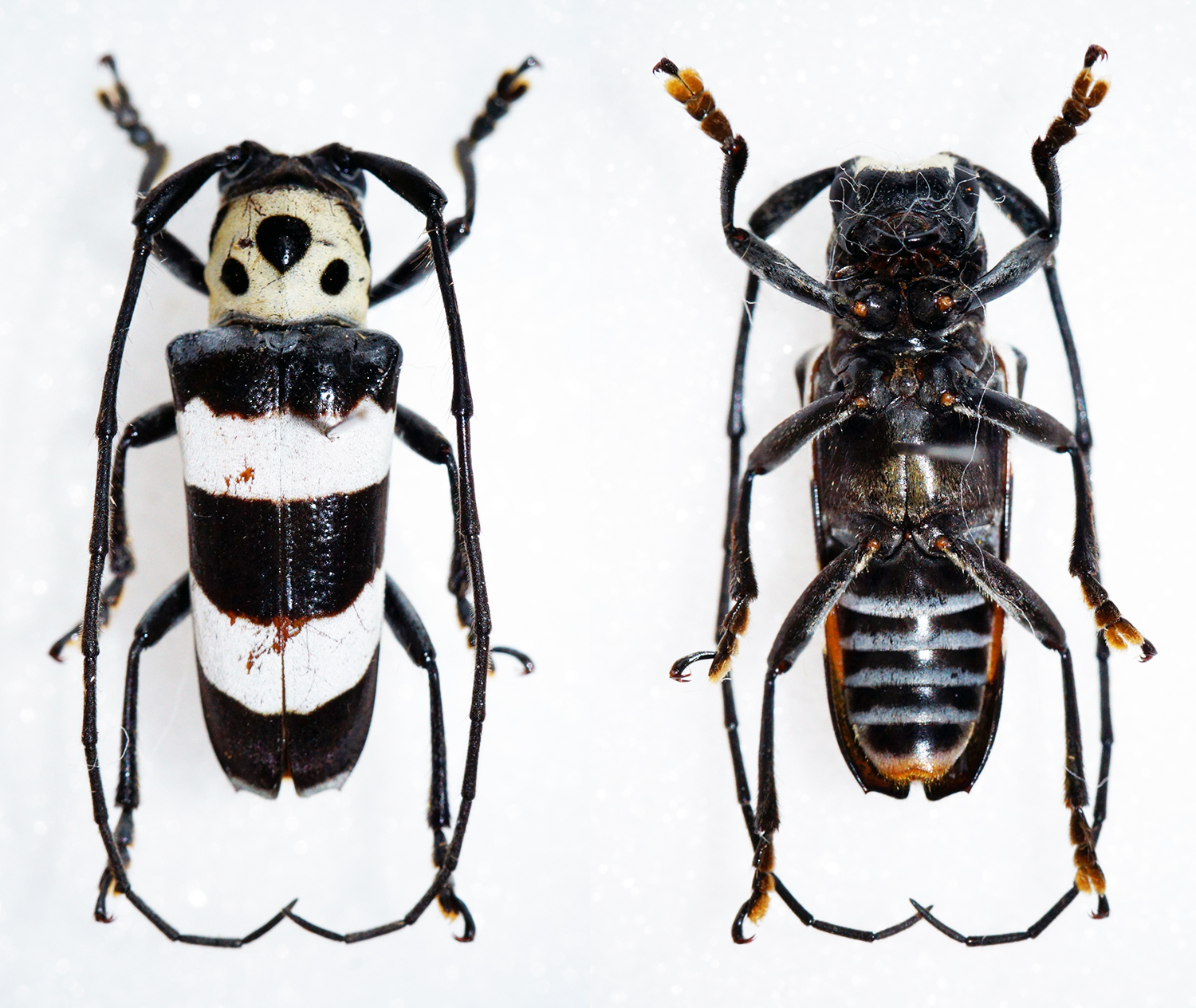

Scientific classification
- Kingdom: Animalia
- Phylum: Arthropoda
- Clade: Pancrustacea
- Class: Insecta
- Order: Coleoptera
- Suborder: Polyphaga
- Infraorder: Cucujiformia
- Family: Cerambycidae
- Genus: Oedudes
- Species: O. spectabilis

Binomial name
- Oedudes spectabilis (Drury, 1782)

= Oedudes spectabilis =

Species of beetle

Oedudes spectabilis is a species of beetle in the family Cerambycidae. It was described by Dru Drury in 1782. It is known from Colombia, Mexico and Panama.
