= Amesia =

Amesia may refer to:

- Amesia (moth), a genus of moths in the family Zygaenidae
- Amesia (fungus), a genus of fungi in the family Chaetomiaceae
- Amesia, a genus of plants in the family Orchidaceae, synonym of Epipactis
