= Jurinella =

Scientific classification
- Kingdom: Animalia
- Phylum: Arthropoda
- Clade: Pancrustacea
- Class: Insecta
- Order: Diptera
- Family: Tachinidae
- Subfamily: Tachininae
- Tribe: Tachinini
- Genus: Jurinella; Brauer & von Bergenstamm, 1889

Type species
- Jurinia coeruleonigra Macquart, 1846

Synonyms
- Pseudohystricia Brauer & Bergenstamm, 1889; Eujurinia Townsend, 1908; Neojurinia Townsend, 1914; Hystriciella Townsend, 1915; Saundersiopmima Townsend, 1927; Tachinosoma Townsend, 1927; Parajurinia Townsend, 1928; Eujuriniopsis Townsend, 1931; Gigantachinosoma Townsend, 1932; Tachinosomopsis Blanchard, 1941

Genus of flies

Jurinella is a genus of flies in the family Tachinidae.

== Species ==
- Jurinella abdominalis (Townsend, 1914)
- Jurinella abscondens (Townsend, 1914)
- Jurinella anax Curran, 1947
- Jurinella andicola Townsend, 1914
- Jurinella apicata Curran, 1947
- Jurinella ariel Curran, 1947
- Jurinella baoruco Woodley, 2007
- Jurinella bella Curran, 1947
- Jurinella caeruleonigra (Macquart, 1846)
- Jurinella circularis Curran, 1947
- Jurinella connota Curran, 1947
- Jurinella corpulenta (Townsend, 1927)
- Jurinella crossi (Blanchard, 1942)
- Jurinella debitrix (Walker, 1860)
- Jurinella egle Curran, 1947
- Jurinella epileuca Walker, 1849
- Jurinella feminea Curran, 1947
- Jurinella ferruginea Townsend, 1929
- Jurinella fuscicornis Curran, 1925
- Jurinella gertschi Curran, 1947
- Jurinella gigantea (Townsend, 1932)
- Jurinella huntingtoni Curran, 1947
- Jurinella jicaltepecia Townsend, 1931
- Jurinella jujuyensis (Blanchard, 1941)
- Jurinella koehleri (Blanchard, 1941)
- Jurinella lata Curran, 1947
- Jurinella lutzi Curran, 1947
- Jurinella maculata Vimmer & Soukup, 1940
- Jurinella major Curran, 1925
- Jurinella mexicana Curran, 1947
- Jurinella milleri Curran, 1947
- Jurinella minuta Curran, 1947
- Jurinella niveisquamma (Engel, 1920)
- Jurinella obesa (Townsend, 1928)
- Jurinella obesa (Wiedemann, 1830)
- Jurinella palpalis Curran, 1947
- Jurinella panamena Curran, 1947
- Jurinella pilosa (Drury, 1773)
- Jurinella pollinosa (Wulp, 1888)
- Jurinella procteri Curran, 1947
- Jurinella producta Curran, 1947
- Jurinella profusa Curran, 1947
- Jurinella reducta Curran, 1947
- Jurinella rufiventris Vimmer & Soukup, 1940
- Jurinella salla Curran, 1947
- Jurinella schwarzi Curran, 1947
- Jurinella spinosa (Townsend, 1927)
- Jurinella thoracica Curran, 1925
- Jurinella vaga Curran, 1947
- Jurinella vargas Curran, 1947
- Jurinella varians Curran, 1947
- Jurinella zeteki Curran, 1947
