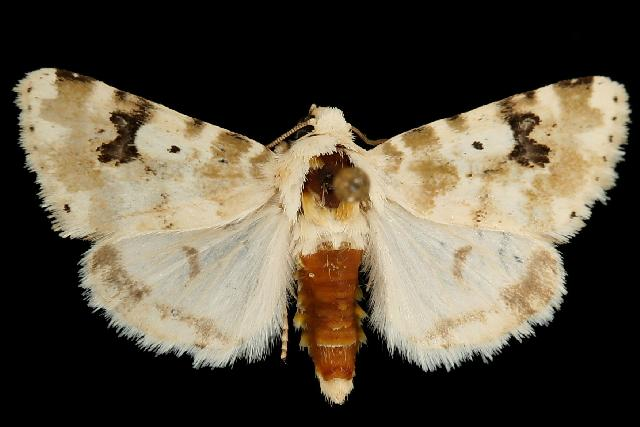

Scientific classification
- Domain: Eukaryota
- Kingdom: Animalia
- Phylum: Arthropoda
- Class: Insecta
- Order: Lepidoptera
- Superfamily: Noctuoidea
- Family: Noctuidae
- Genus: Schinia
- Species: S. nundina

Binomial name
- Schinia nundina Drury, [1773]

= Schinia nundina =

Species of moth

Schinia nundina, the goldenrod flower moth, is a moth of the family Noctuidae. The species was first described by Dru Drury in 1773. It is found in North America from Minnesota to southern Ontario and Nova Scotia, south to central Florida and southern Texas. Records include Arizona, Kansas, Nebraska, New York, Maryland, Oklahoma and South Carolina.

There is one generation per year.

The larvae feed on Aster and Solidago.
