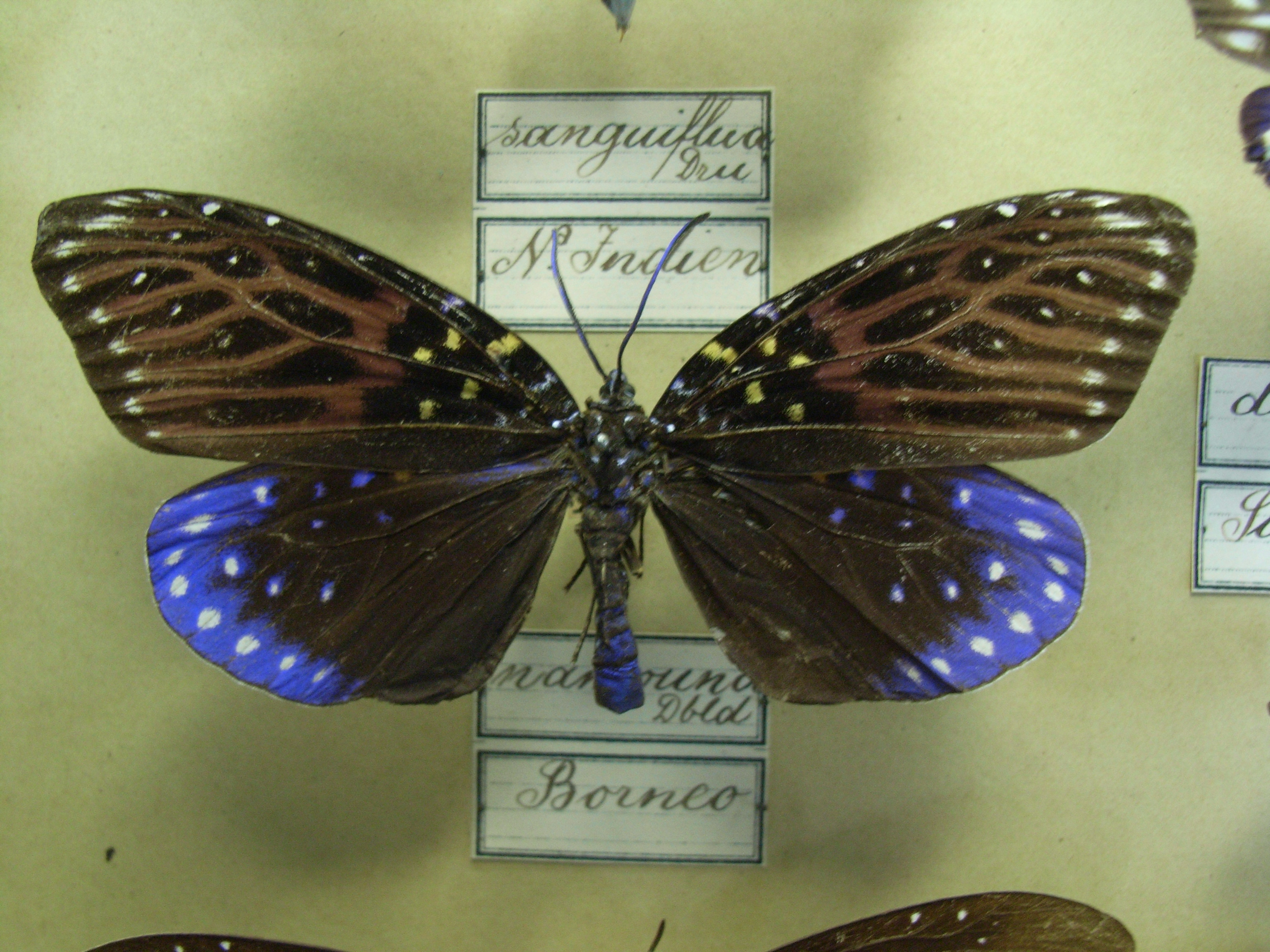

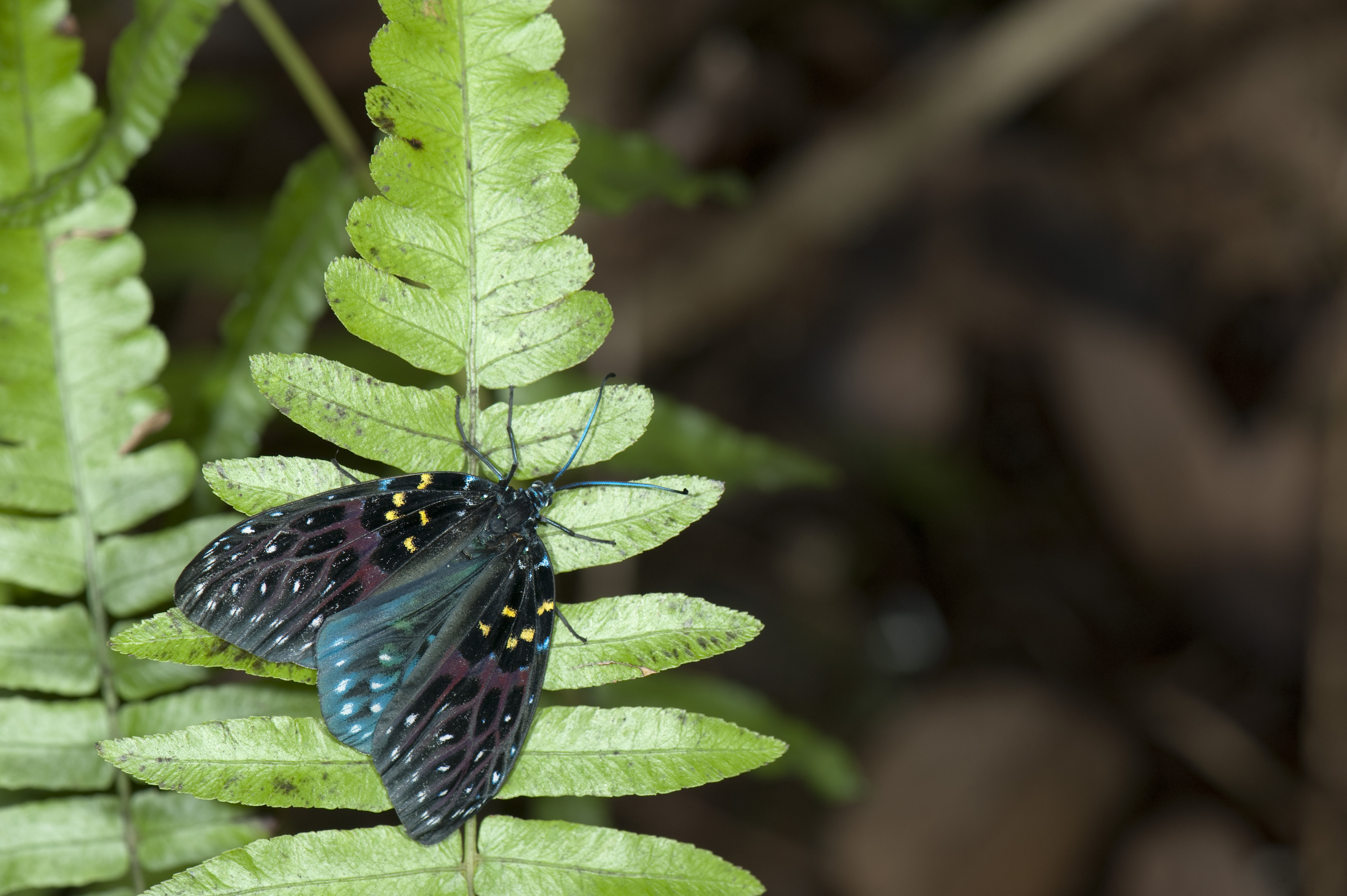

Scientific classification
- Domain: Eukaryota
- Kingdom: Animalia
- Phylum: Arthropoda
- Class: Insecta
- Order: Lepidoptera
- Family: Zygaenidae
- Genus: Amesia
- Species: A. sanguiflua

Binomial name
- Amesia sanguiflua (Drury, 1773)

= Amesia sanguiflua =

Species of moth

Amesia sanguiflua is a moth of the family Zygaenidae. It is found in northern India, Myanmar, Indochina, the Malay Peninsula, Sumatra, Java, and Taiwan.

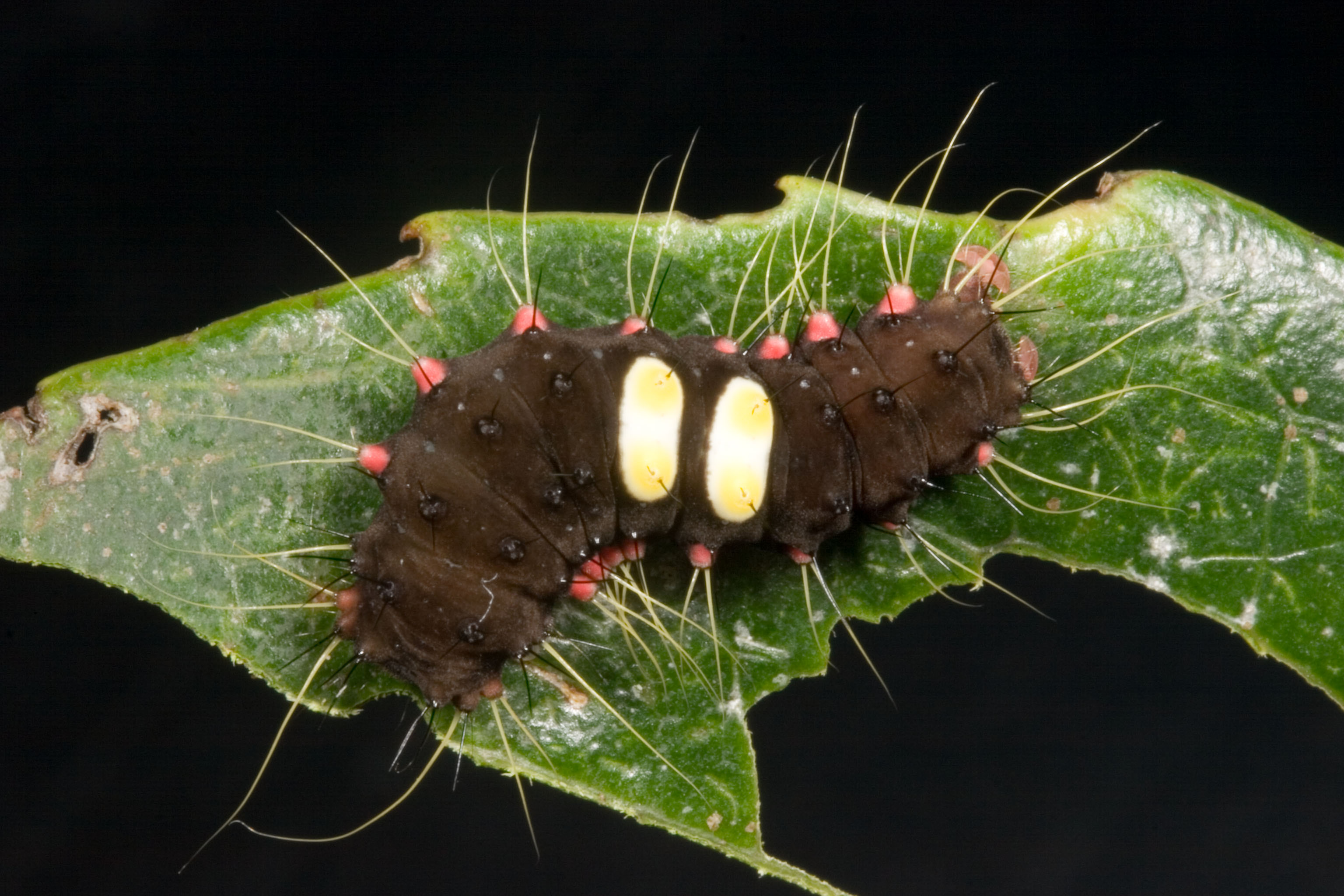
Caterpillar

== Subspecies ==
- Amesia sanguiflua sanguiflua (main subspecies) (Drury, 1773) (northern India, Myanmar, Indochina, and the Malay Peninsula)
- Amesia sanguiflua lugens (Dohrn, 1906) (Sumatra)
- Amesia sanguiflua gedeana Frustorfer, 1897 (Java)
- Amesia sanguiflua viriditincta Hampson, 1919 (Taiwan)

== External links and Resources ==
- Japanese moths
