= Polyrhaphis gracilis =

Scientific classification
- Domain: Eukaryota
- Kingdom: Animalia
- Phylum: Arthropoda
- Class: Insecta
- Order: Coleoptera
- Suborder: Polyphaga
- Infraorder: Cucujiformia
- Family: Cerambycidae
- Genus: Polyrhaphis
- Species: P. gracilis

Binomial name
- Polyrhaphis gracilis Bates, 1862

Synonyms
- Polyrhaphis testacea Lane, 1965

Species of beetle

Polyrhaphis gracilis is a species of beetle in the family Cerambycidae. It was described by Henry Walter Bates in 1862. It is known from Brazil, Ecuador, and Bolivia.
