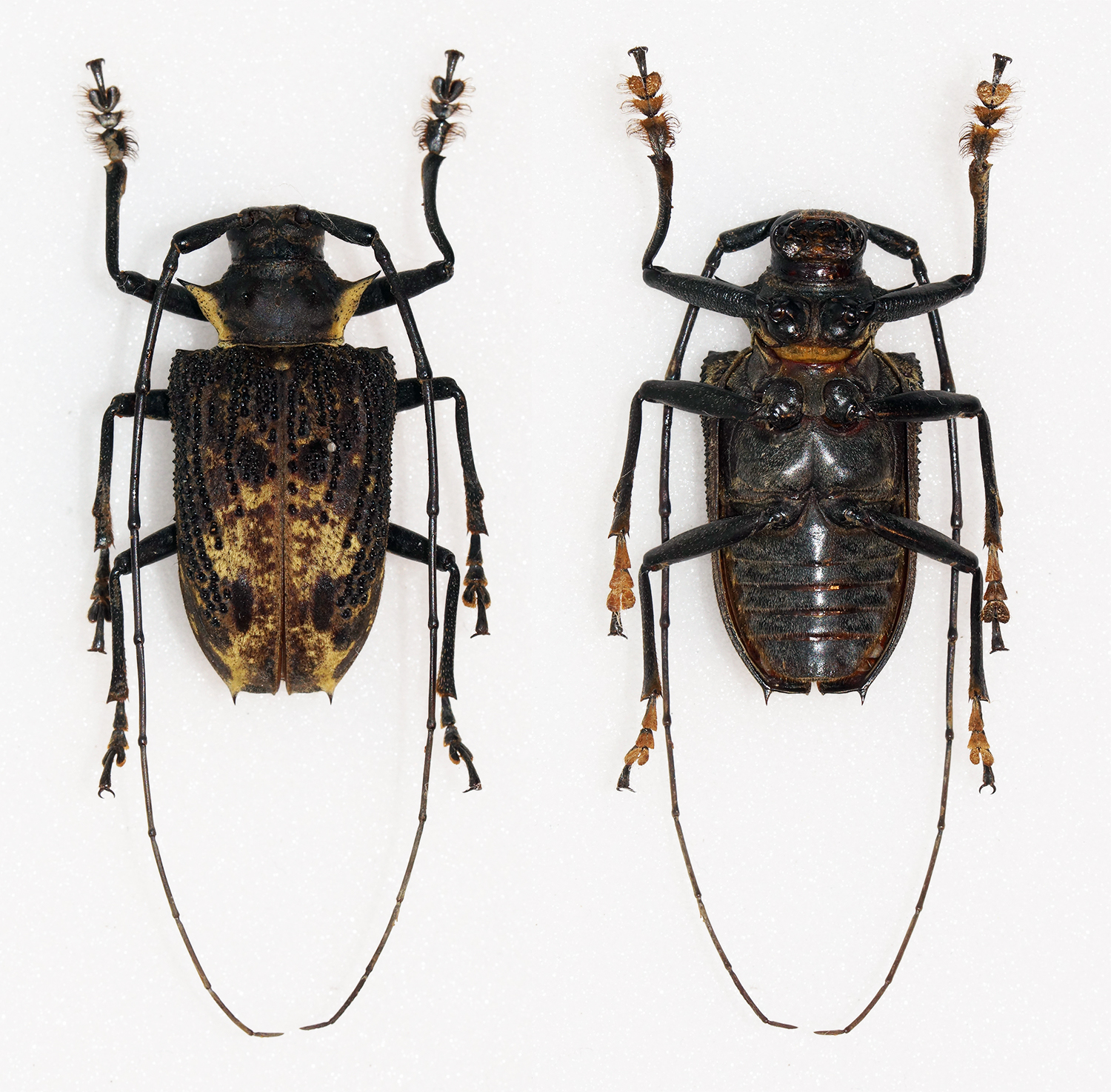

Scientific classification
- Domain: Eukaryota
- Kingdom: Animalia
- Phylum: Arthropoda
- Class: Insecta
- Order: Coleoptera
- Suborder: Polyphaga
- Infraorder: Cucujiformia
- Family: Cerambycidae
- Genus: Polyrhaphis
- Species: P. pilosa

Binomial name
- Polyrhaphis pilosa Lane, 1965

= Polyrhaphis pilosa =

Species of beetle

Polyrhaphis pilosa is a species of beetle in the family Cerambycidae. It was described by Lane in 1965. It is known from Bolivia, Ecuador, Guyana, French Guiana, Peru and Suriname.
