= Jurinella lutzi =

Scientific classification
- Kingdom: Animalia
- Phylum: Arthropoda
- Clade: Pancrustacea
- Class: Insecta
- Order: Diptera
- Family: Tachinidae
- Subfamily: Tachininae
- Tribe: Tachinini
- Genus: Jurinella
- Species: J. lutzi

Binomial name
- Jurinella lutzi Curran, 1947

Species of fly

Jurinella lutzi is a species of bristle fly in the family Tachinidae.

== Distribution ==
Mexico, United States.
