= Polyrhaphis hystricina =

Scientific classification
- Domain: Eukaryota
- Kingdom: Animalia
- Phylum: Arthropoda
- Class: Insecta
- Order: Coleoptera
- Suborder: Polyphaga
- Infraorder: Cucujiformia
- Family: Cerambycidae
- Genus: Polyrhaphis
- Species: P. hystricina

Binomial name
- Polyrhaphis hystricina Bates, 1862

Species of beetle

Polyrhaphis hystricina is a species of beetle in the family Cerambycidae. It was described by Henry Walter Bates in 1862. It is known from Brazil and French Guiana.
