= Polyrhaphis argentina =

Scientific classification
- Domain: Eukaryota
- Kingdom: Animalia
- Phylum: Arthropoda
- Class: Insecta
- Order: Coleoptera
- Suborder: Polyphaga
- Infraorder: Cucujiformia
- Family: Cerambycidae
- Genus: Polyrhaphis
- Species: P. argentina

Binomial name
- Polyrhaphis argentina Lane, 1978

Synonyms
- Polyrhaphis paraensis Bates, 1862

Species of beetle

Polyrhaphis argentina is a species of beetle in the family Cerambycidae. It was described by Lane in 1978. It is known from Bolivia, Argentina, Peru, and Paraguay.
