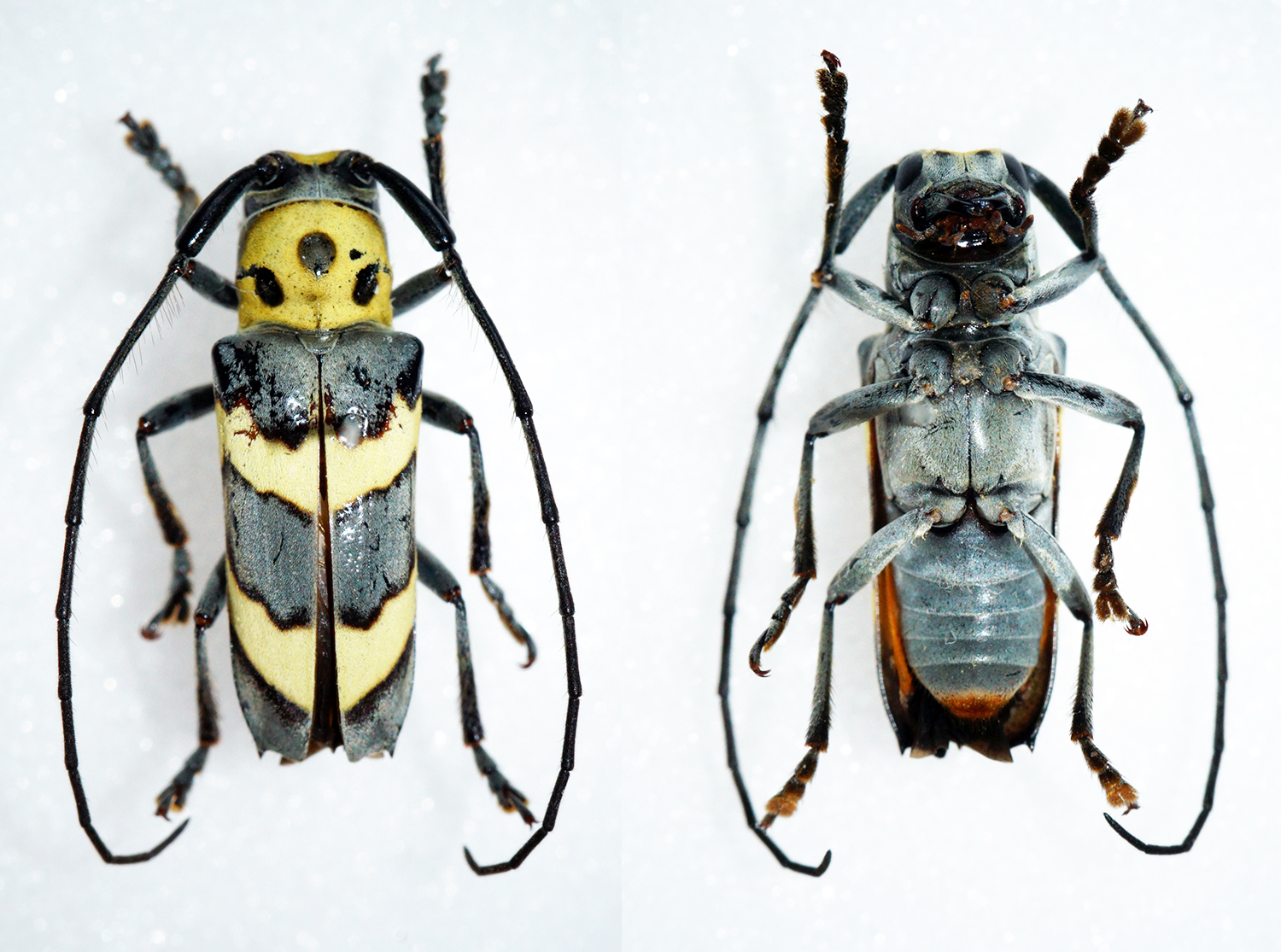
- Dorsal and ventral views of a male

Scientific classification
- Domain: Eukaryota
- Kingdom: Animalia
- Phylum: Arthropoda
- Class: Insecta
- Order: Coleoptera
- Suborder: Polyphaga
- Infraorder: Cucujiformia
- Family: Cerambycidae
- Genus: Oedudes
- Species: O. bifasciata

Binomial name
- Oedudes bifasciata (Bates, 1869)

Synonyms
- Oedudes bifasciatus (Bates, 1869)

= Oedudes bifasciata =

Species of beetle

Oedudes bifasciata is a species of beetle in the family Cerambycidae. It was described by Henry Walter Bates in 1869. It is known from Panama, Honduras, Costa Rica and Nicaragua.
