= Oedudes annulatus =

Scientific classification
- Domain: Eukaryota
- Kingdom: Animalia
- Phylum: Arthropoda
- Class: Insecta
- Order: Coleoptera
- Suborder: Polyphaga
- Infraorder: Cucujiformia
- Family: Cerambycidae
- Genus: Oedudes
- Species: O. annulatus

Binomial name
- Oedudes annulatus Lingafelter, 2013

Species of beetle

Oedudes annulatus is a species of beetle in the family Cerambycidae. It was described by Lingafelter in 2013.
