= Polyrhaphis batesi =

Scientific classification
- Domain: Eukaryota
- Kingdom: Animalia
- Phylum: Arthropoda
- Class: Insecta
- Order: Coleoptera
- Suborder: Polyphaga
- Infraorder: Cucujiformia
- Family: Cerambycidae
- Genus: Polyrhaphis
- Species: P. batesi

Binomial name
- Polyrhaphis batesi Hovore & McCarty, 1998

Synonyms
- Polyrhaphis paraensis Bates, 1862

Species of beetle

Polyrhaphis batesi is a species of beetle in the family Cerambycidae. It was described by Hovore and McCarty in 1998. It is known from El Salvador, Honduras, Guatemala, Costa Rica, Nicaragua, Mexico, and Panama.
