= Polyrhaphis armiger =

Scientific classification
- Domain: Eukaryota
- Kingdom: Animalia
- Phylum: Arthropoda
- Class: Insecta
- Order: Coleoptera
- Suborder: Polyphaga
- Infraorder: Cucujiformia
- Family: Cerambycidae
- Genus: Polyrhaphis
- Species: P. armiger

Binomial name
- Polyrhaphis armiger (Schoenherr, 1817)

Species of beetle

Polyrhaphis armiger is a species of beetle in the family Cerambycidae. It was described by Schoenherr in 1817.
