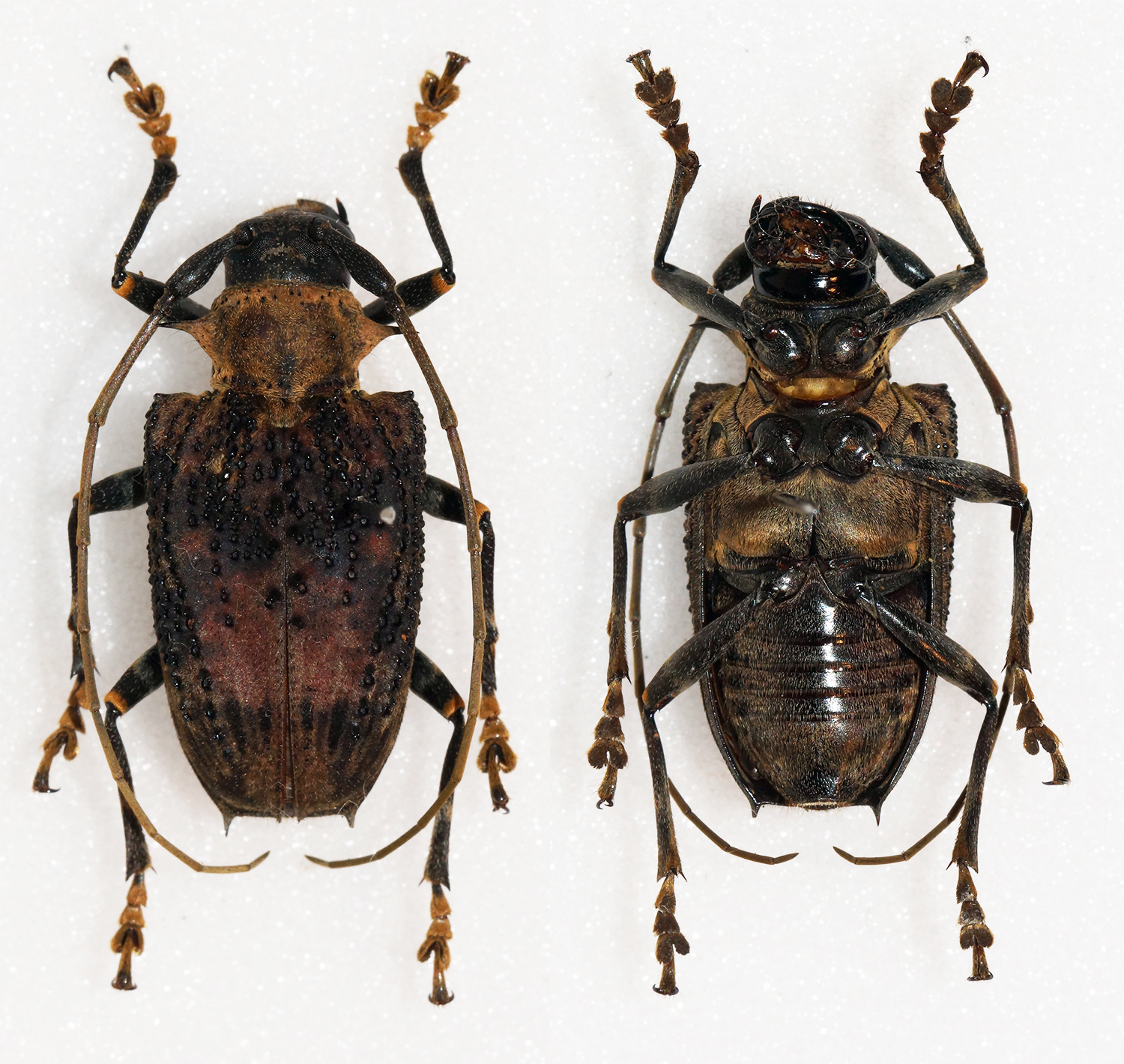

Scientific classification
- Kingdom: Animalia
- Phylum: Arthropoda
- Clade: Pancrustacea
- Class: Insecta
- Order: Coleoptera
- Suborder: Polyphaga
- Infraorder: Cucujiformia
- Family: Cerambycidae
- Genus: Polyrhaphis
- Species: P. papulosa

Binomial name
- Polyrhaphis papulosa (Olivier, 1795)

Synonyms
- Polyrhaphis paraensis Bates, 1862

= Polyrhaphis papulosa =

Species of beetle

Polyrhaphis papulosa is a species of beetle in the family Cerambycidae. It was described by Guillaume-Antoine Olivier in 1795. It is known from Colombia, Peru, Brazil, and French Guiana.
