= Society of Entomologists of London =

Defunct learned society

The Society of Entomologists of London was one of a series of brief-lived entomological societies based in London. The members met to exhibit, identify and exchange, sell or purchase insects which were sometimes very expensive as were books. Entomology was limited to the wealthy. It was a time of colonial expansion and exotica of all kinds flooded into trade centres such as London or Amsterdam. These included shells as well as insects and many entomologists collected these too.

In the 1700s people met at coffeehouses and taverns in London and several had meetings catering to specific interests. The botanists met at the Rainbow Coffee House, Watling Street, while the entomologists met at the Swan Tavern, Exchange Alley from the 1720s. These early entomologists, mainly interested in butterflies, formed a group and called themselves the Society of Aurelians.

== Chronology ==
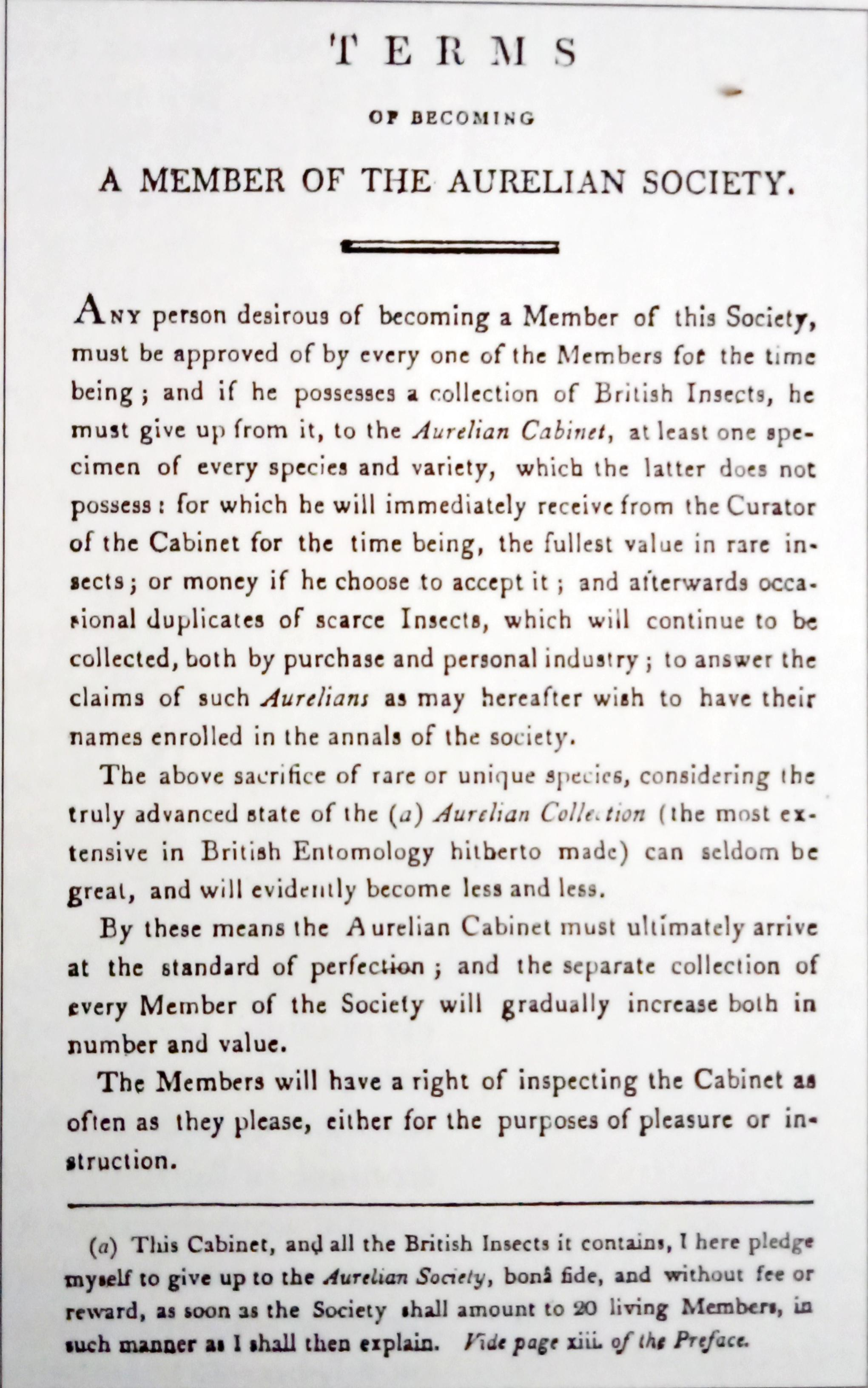
Haworth's terms for members of the (third) Aurelian Society, 1801

- 1745 is the first definite year for the Aurelian Society of London but it was almost certainly already in existence before that year. The Aurelian Society disbanded after a fire on 25 March 1748 destroyed the Library and records of the Society. 25 March was the new year of the Julian Calendar in those times and the Society members were present at 1 AM when the fire swept through. Moses Harris was a member and its founder is thought to have been Joseph Dandridge. Other members were Benjamin Wilkes, Peter Collinson, Thomas Knowlton, James Leman (or Lemon), Henry Baker, Stephen Austin, Samuel Lee, Samuel Hartley, Elias Brownsword, Walter Blackett, Philip Constable jr, Thomas Grace, Daniel Marshal, Edmund Overall and William Wells. It is claimed to be the first entomological society in the world although there were similar groups in Italy, France and the German states.
- 1762 saw the formation of the second Aurelian Society, with Moses Harris as secretary, which survived only a few years, destroyed by dissent within the group although the details are unknown. The collections of the society were seen by Johann Christian Fabricius in 1767.
- 1780 was the foundation year of the Society of Entomologists of London, which survived until August 1782. Dru Drury was a member.
- 1788 saw the founding of the Linnean Society following the purchase of Linnaeus' collections by Sir James Smith a few years earlier.
- 1801 saw a third Aurelian Society founded by Adrian Haworth who also established a set of stringent terms for member. It survived until April, 1806, with only ten members and little growth, when it was dissolved.
- 1806/7 was the year in which former Aurelians formed a new society entitled the Entomological Society (later called the Entomological Society of London).
- 1815 In the Waterloo year the last of the three parts of its [one-volume] Transactions had appeared, the Entomological Society of London went into decline, and met only occasionally until 1822.

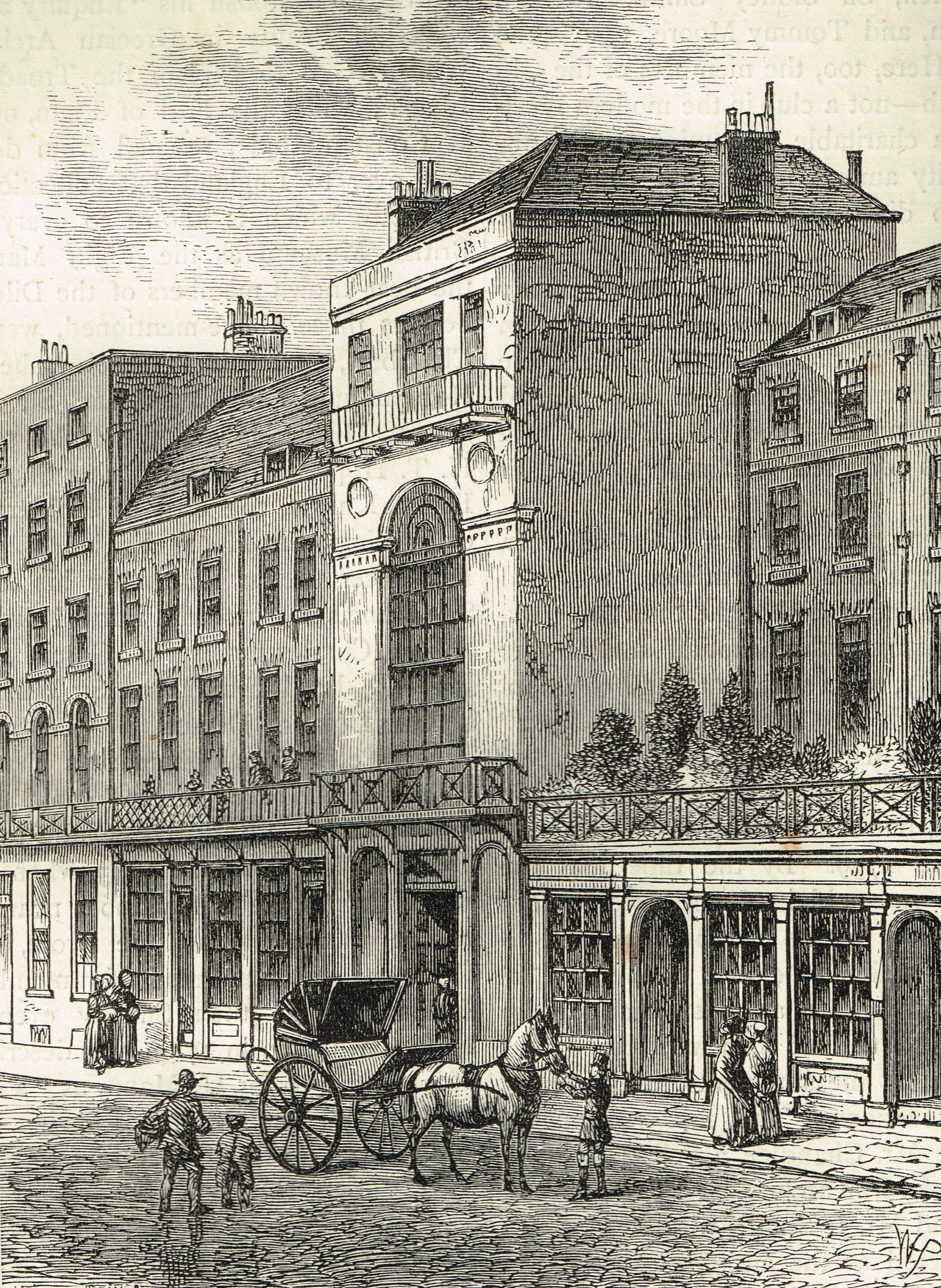
Thatched House Tavern where the first general meeting of the Entomological Society of London was held in May 1833

- 1822 several of the members of the Society set up another Society, the Entomological Society of Great Britain, and the Entomological Society of London was adjourned for a year.
- 1824 saw most of the members of the two latter societies joined with various members of the Linnean Society of London to found the Zoological Club of the Linnean Society of London, which later became the Zoological Society of London.
- In 1826 another entomological society was formed, the Entomological Club. The Club was at first scientific and published the Entomological Magazine (from September 1832 to October, 1838) but later evolved into a dining club which is still active today.
- 1833, 22 May of this year, the second Entomological Society of London held a general meeting held at the Thatched House Tavern. J. F. Stephens chaired the meeting, with William Kirby as honorary life president and J.G. Children as the president. It became the Royal Entomological Society of London.
