= Oedudes ramsdeni =

Scientific classification
- Kingdom: Animalia
- Phylum: Arthropoda
- Clade: Pancrustacea
- Class: Insecta
- Order: Coleoptera
- Suborder: Polyphaga
- Infraorder: Cucujiformia
- Family: Cerambycidae
- Genus: Oedudes
- Species: O. ramsdeni

Binomial name
- Oedudes ramsdeni (Fisher, 1926)

Species of beetle

Oedudes ramsdeni is a species of beetle in the family Cerambycidae. It was described by Fisher in 1926. It is known from Cuba.
