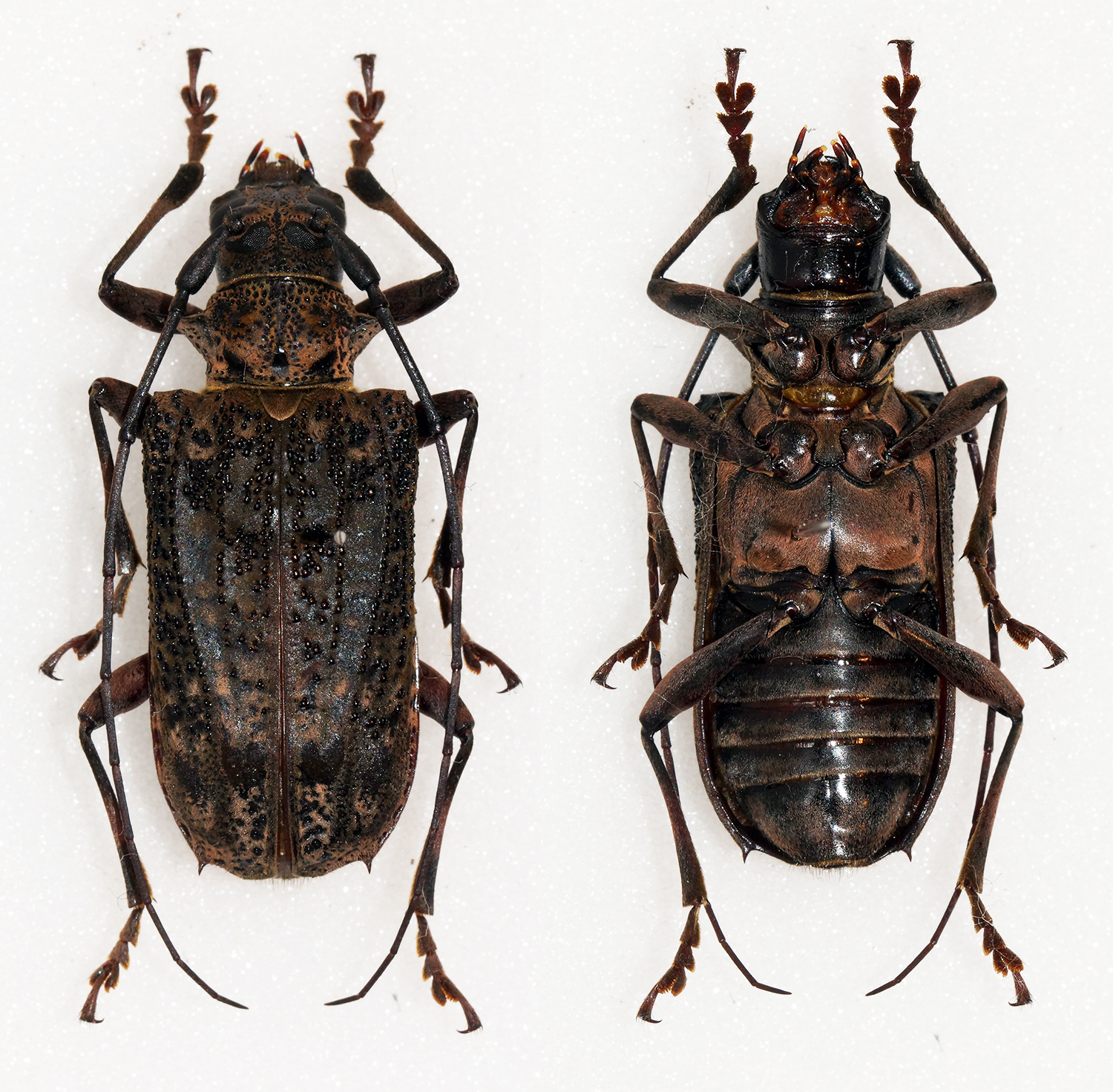
- Polyrhaphis angustata

Scientific classification
- Domain: Eukaryota
- Kingdom: Animalia
- Phylum: Arthropoda
- Class: Insecta
- Order: Coleoptera
- Suborder: Polyphaga
- Infraorder: Cucujiformia
- Family: Cerambycidae
- Subfamily: Lamiinae
- Genus: Polyrhaphis

= Polyrhaphis =

Genus of beetles

Polyrhaphis is a genus of longhorn beetles of the subfamily Lamiinae, containing the following species:

- Polyrhaphis angustata Buquet, 1853
- Polyrhaphis argentina Lane, 1978
- Polyrhaphis armiger (Schoenherr, 1817)
- Polyrhaphis baloupae Santos-Silva, Martins & Tavakilian, 2010
- Polyrhaphis batesi Hovore & McCarty, 1998
- Polyrhaphis belti Hovore & McCarty, 1998
- Polyrhaphis confusa Lane, 1978
- Polyrhaphis fabricii Thomson, 1865
- Polyrhaphis gracilis Bates, 1862
- Polyrhaphis grandini Buquet, 1853
- Polyrhaphis hystricina Bates, 1862
- Polyrhaphis jansoni Pascoe, 1859
- Polyrhaphis kempfi Lane, 1978
- Polyrhaphis lanei Santos-Silva, Martins & Tavakilian, 2010
- Polyrhaphis michaeli McCarty, 1997
- Polyrhaphis olivieri Thomson, 1865
- Polyrhaphis papulosa (Olivier, 1795)
- Polyrhaphis peruana Santos-Silva, Martins & Tavakilian, 2010
- Polyrhaphis pilosa Lane, 1965
- Polyrhaphis spinipennis Laporte, 1840
- Polyrhaphis spinosa (Drury, 1773)
- Polyrhaphis turnbowi Hovore & McCarty, 1998
