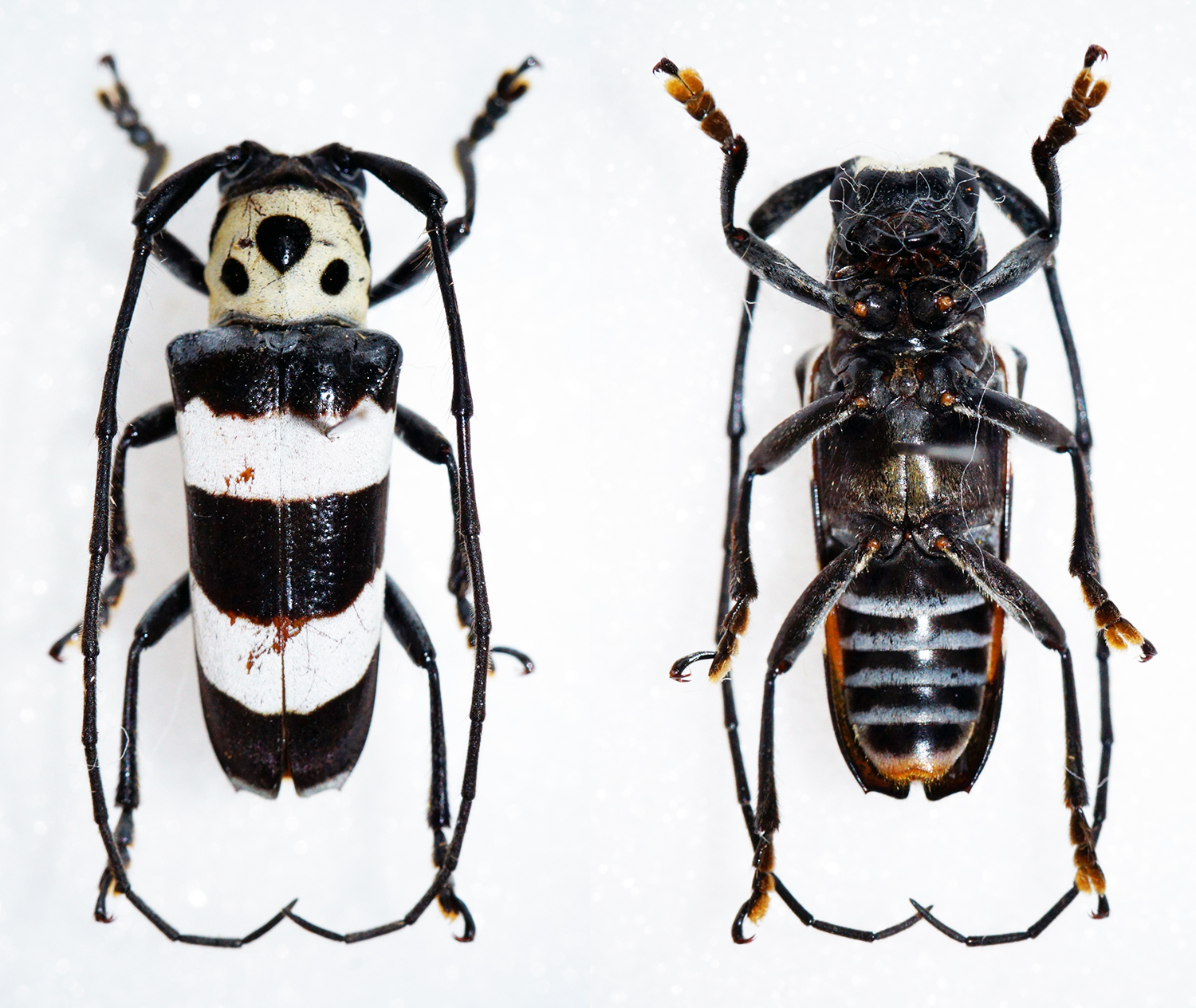
- Oedudes spectabilis

Scientific classification
- Domain: Eukaryota
- Kingdom: Animalia
- Phylum: Arthropoda
- Class: Insecta
- Order: Coleoptera
- Suborder: Polyphaga
- Infraorder: Cucujiformia
- Family: Cerambycidae
- Genus: Oedudes

= Oedudes =

Genus of beetles

Oedudes is a genus of longhorn beetles of the subfamily Lamiinae, containing the following species:

- Oedudes alayoi (Zayas, 1956)
- Oedudes annulatus Lingafelter, 2013
- Oedudes bifasciata (Bates, 1869)
- Oedudes callizona (Bates, 1881)
- Oedudes ramsdeni (Fisher, 1926)
- Oedudes roberto (Fisher, 1935)
- Oedudes scaramuzzai (Fisher, 1936)
- Oedudes spectabilis (Drury, 1782)
