= Polyrhaphis confusa =

Scientific classification
- Domain: Eukaryota
- Kingdom: Animalia
- Phylum: Arthropoda
- Class: Insecta
- Order: Coleoptera
- Suborder: Polyphaga
- Infraorder: Cucujiformia
- Family: Cerambycidae
- Genus: Polyrhaphis
- Species: P. confusa

Binomial name
- Polyrhaphis confusa Lane, 1978

Species of beetle

Polyrhaphis confusa is a species of beetle in the family Cerambycidae. It was described by Lane in 1978. It is known from Brazil.
