= Polyrhaphis michaeli =

Scientific classification
- Domain: Eukaryota
- Kingdom: Animalia
- Phylum: Arthropoda
- Class: Insecta
- Order: Coleoptera
- Suborder: Polyphaga
- Infraorder: Cucujiformia
- Family: Cerambycidae
- Genus: Polyrhaphis
- Species: P. michaeli

Binomial name
- Polyrhaphis michaeli McCarty, 1997

Species of beetle

Polyrhaphis michaeli is a species of beetle in the family Cerambycidae. It was described by McCarty in 1997. It is known from Mexico.
