= Polyrhaphis spinipennis =

Scientific classification
- Domain: Eukaryota
- Kingdom: Animalia
- Phylum: Arthropoda
- Class: Insecta
- Order: Coleoptera
- Suborder: Polyphaga
- Infraorder: Cucujiformia
- Family: Cerambycidae
- Genus: Polyrhaphis
- Species: P. spinipennis

Binomial name
- Polyrhaphis spinipennis Laporte de Castelnau, 1840

Species of beetle

Polyrhaphis spinipennis is a species of beetle in the family Cerambycidae. It was described by Laporte in 1840. It is known from South America.
