= Polyrhaphis belti =

Scientific classification
- Domain: Eukaryota
- Kingdom: Animalia
- Phylum: Arthropoda
- Class: Insecta
- Order: Coleoptera
- Suborder: Polyphaga
- Infraorder: Cucujiformia
- Family: Cerambycidae
- Genus: Polyrhaphis
- Species: P. belti

Binomial name
- Polyrhaphis belti Hovore & McCarty, 1998

Synonyms
- Polyrhaphis fabricii Thomson, 1865

Species of beetle

Polyrhaphis belti is a species of beetle in the family Cerambycidae. It was described by Hovore and McCarty in 1998. It is known from Honduras, Costa Rica, Guatemala, Ecuador, Nicaragua, Colombia, and Panama.
