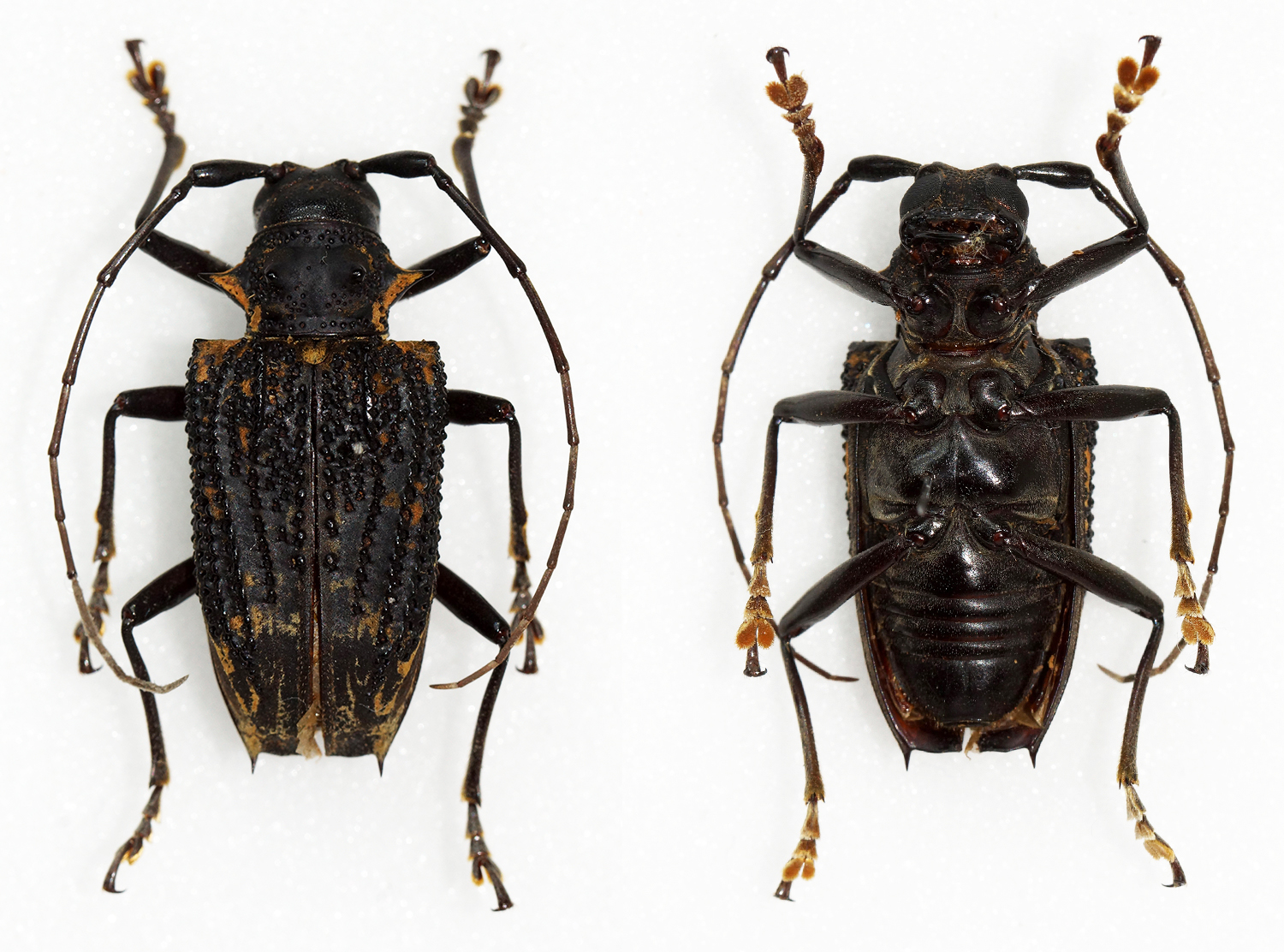

Scientific classification
- Domain: Eukaryota
- Kingdom: Animalia
- Phylum: Arthropoda
- Class: Insecta
- Order: Coleoptera
- Suborder: Polyphaga
- Infraorder: Cucujiformia
- Family: Cerambycidae
- Genus: Polyrhaphis
- Species: P. fabricii

Binomial name
- Polyrhaphis fabricii Thomson, 1865

= Polyrhaphis fabricii =

Species of beetle

Polyrhaphis fabricii is a species of beetle in the family Cerambycidae. It was described by James Thomson in 1865. It is known from Ecuador, Brazil, Peru, French Guiana, Suriname, and Guyana.
