= Oedudes alayoi =

Scientific classification
- Kingdom: Animalia
- Phylum: Arthropoda
- Clade: Pancrustacea
- Class: Insecta
- Order: Coleoptera
- Suborder: Polyphaga
- Infraorder: Cucujiformia
- Family: Cerambycidae
- Genus: Oedudes
- Species: O. alayoi

Binomial name
- Oedudes alayoi (Zayas, 1956)

Synonyms
- Essostruthra alayoi Zayas, 1975

Species of beetle

Oedudes alayoi is a species of beetle in the family Cerambycidae. It was described by Zayas in 1956. It is known from Cuba.
