= Samuel Galton =

Samuel Galton may refer to:

- Samuel Galton Jr., arms manufacturer
- Samuel Tertius Galton, businessman and scientist, son of the above
