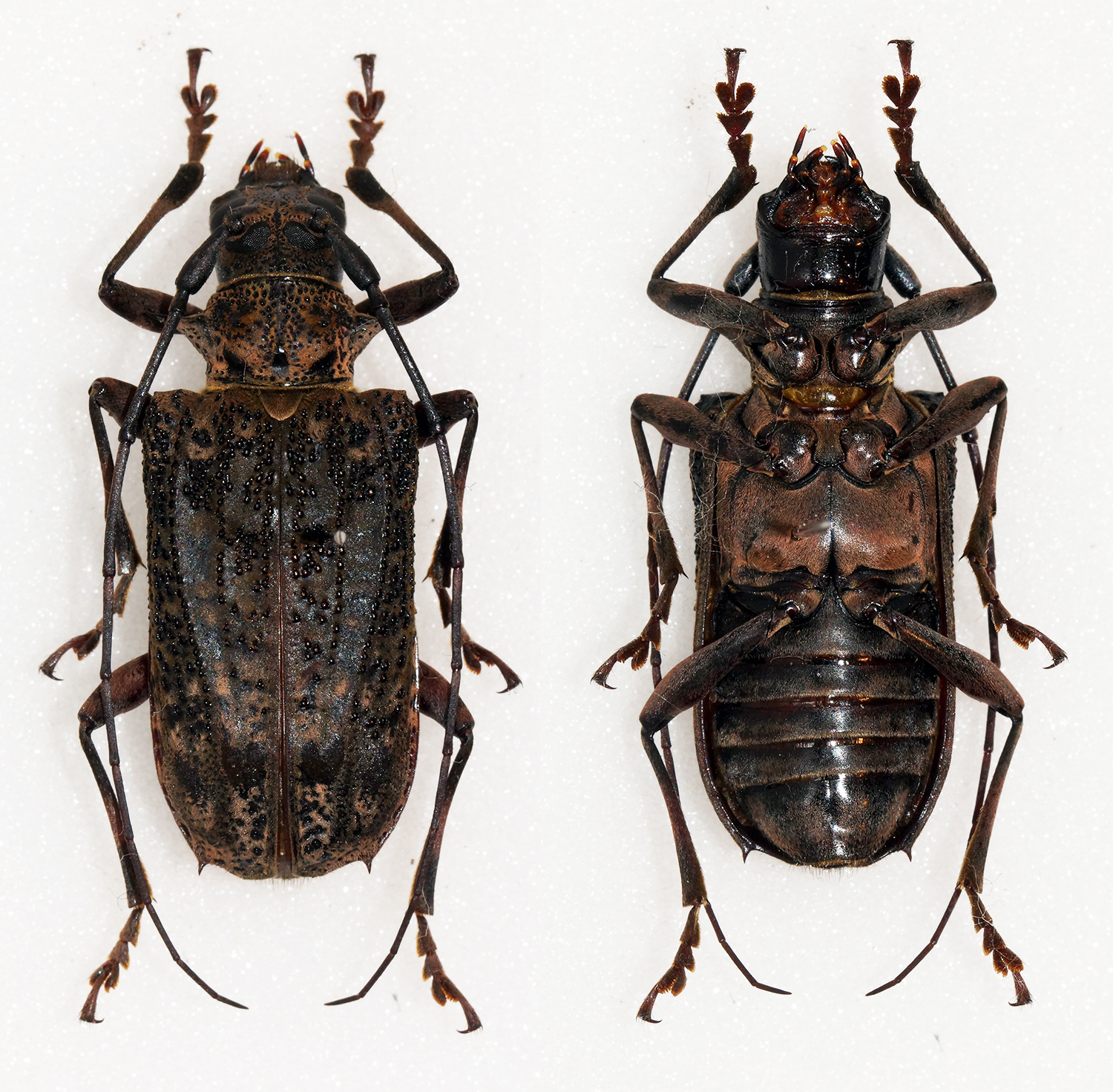

Scientific classification
- Domain: Eukaryota
- Kingdom: Animalia
- Phylum: Arthropoda
- Class: Insecta
- Order: Coleoptera
- Suborder: Polyphaga
- Infraorder: Cucujiformia
- Family: Cerambycidae
- Genus: Polyrhaphis
- Species: P. angustata

Binomial name
- Polyrhaphis angustata Buquet, 1853

Synonyms
- Polyrhaphis elongata Bates, 1880

= Polyrhaphis angustata =

Species of beetle

Polyrhaphis angustata is a species of beetle in the family Cerambycidae. It was described by Buquet in 1853. It is known from Colombia, Nicaragua, Costa Rica, French Guiana, Brazil, Panama, Ecuador, and Peru.
