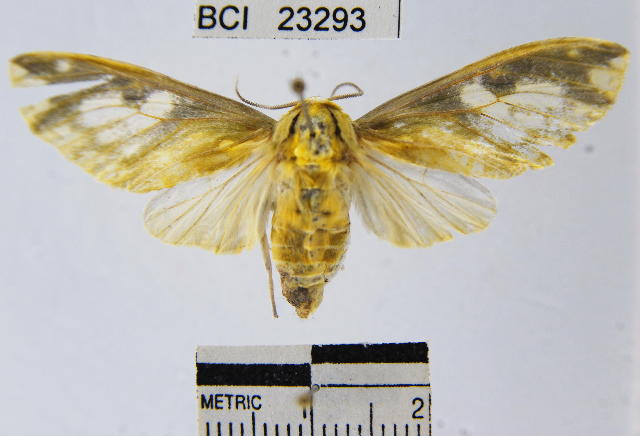
- Castrica phalaenoides

Scientific classification
- Domain: Eukaryota
- Kingdom: Animalia
- Phylum: Arthropoda
- Class: Insecta
- Order: Lepidoptera
- Superfamily: Noctuoidea
- Family: Erebidae
- Subfamily: Arctiinae
- Subtribe: Phaegopterina
- Genus: Castrica; Schaus, 1896

Type species
- Castrica oweni

= Castrica =

Genus of moths

Castrica is a genus of moths in the family Erebidae. The genus was erected by William Schaus in 1896.

== Species ==
- Castrica phalaenoides (Drury, 1773)
- Castrica sordidior Rothschild, 1909
