= Mary Gartside =

British artist (c. 1755–1809)

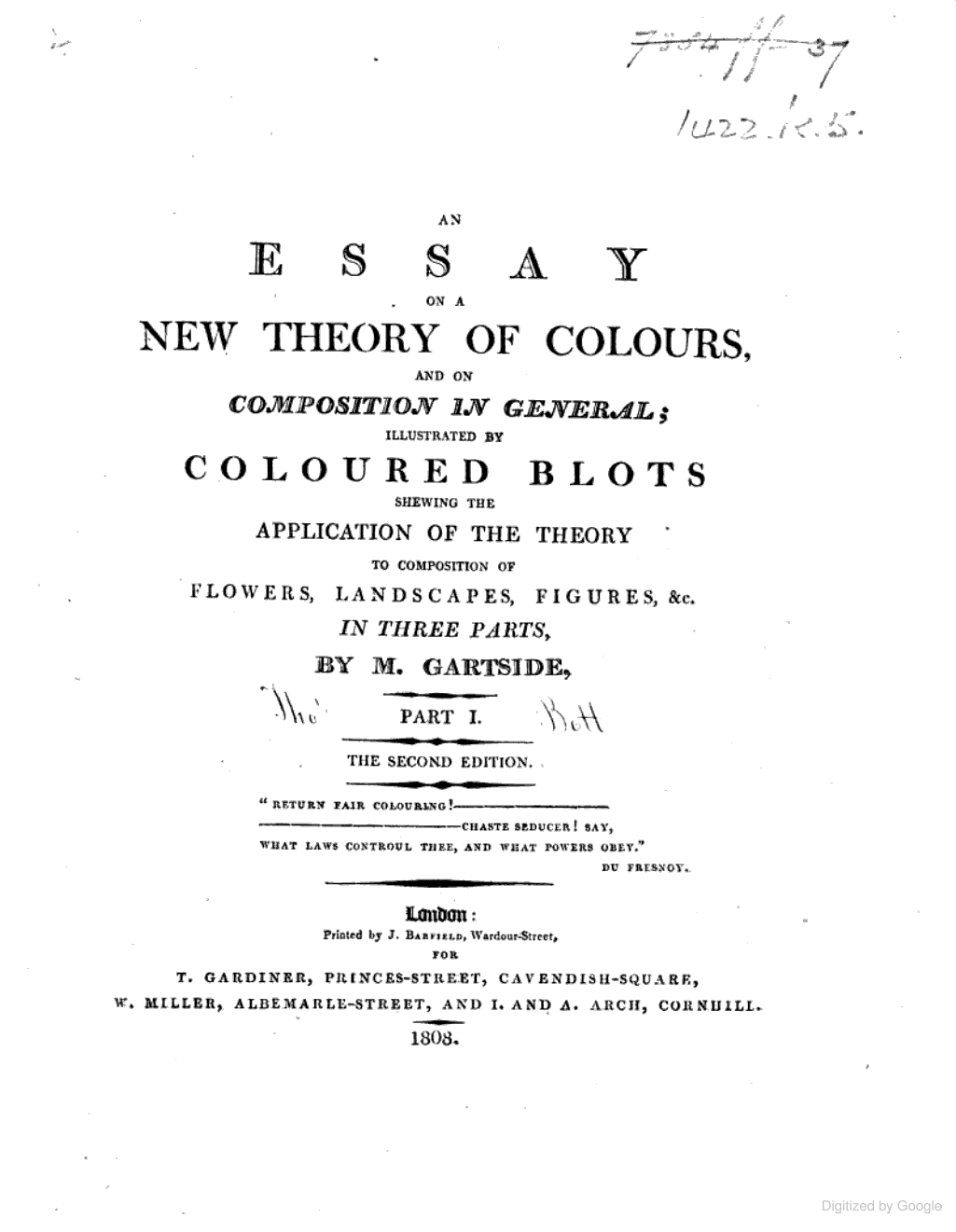
- Born: c. 1755; Manchester and London, England
- Died: 1819
- Known for: Painting, Botany and Colour theory
- Notable work: An Essay on a New Theory of Colour
- Movement: Neoclassicism and Romanticism

Martha [also known as Mary] Gartside (c. 1755-1819) was an English water colourist and colour theorist. She published three books between 1805 and 1808. In chronological and intellectual terms Mary Gartside can be regarded an exemplary link between Moses Harris, who published his short but important Natural System of Colours around 1766, and Johann Wolfgang von Goethe’s highly influential theory Zur Farbenlehre, first published in 1810. Gartside's colour theory was published privately under the disguise of a traditional water colouring manual. She is the first recorded woman known to have published a theory of colour.

== Biography ==
Gartside was very probably born in 1755 and brought up in Manchester, but few details are known.

Gartside exhibited some of her own art work, paintings of flowers in watercolour, at the Royal Academy in 1781, at the Botanic Gardens in Liverpool in 1784, and at the Associated Artists in Water-Color in London in 1808. Mary Gartside died near Ludlow on 9 December 1819, aged 64.

== Published works ==
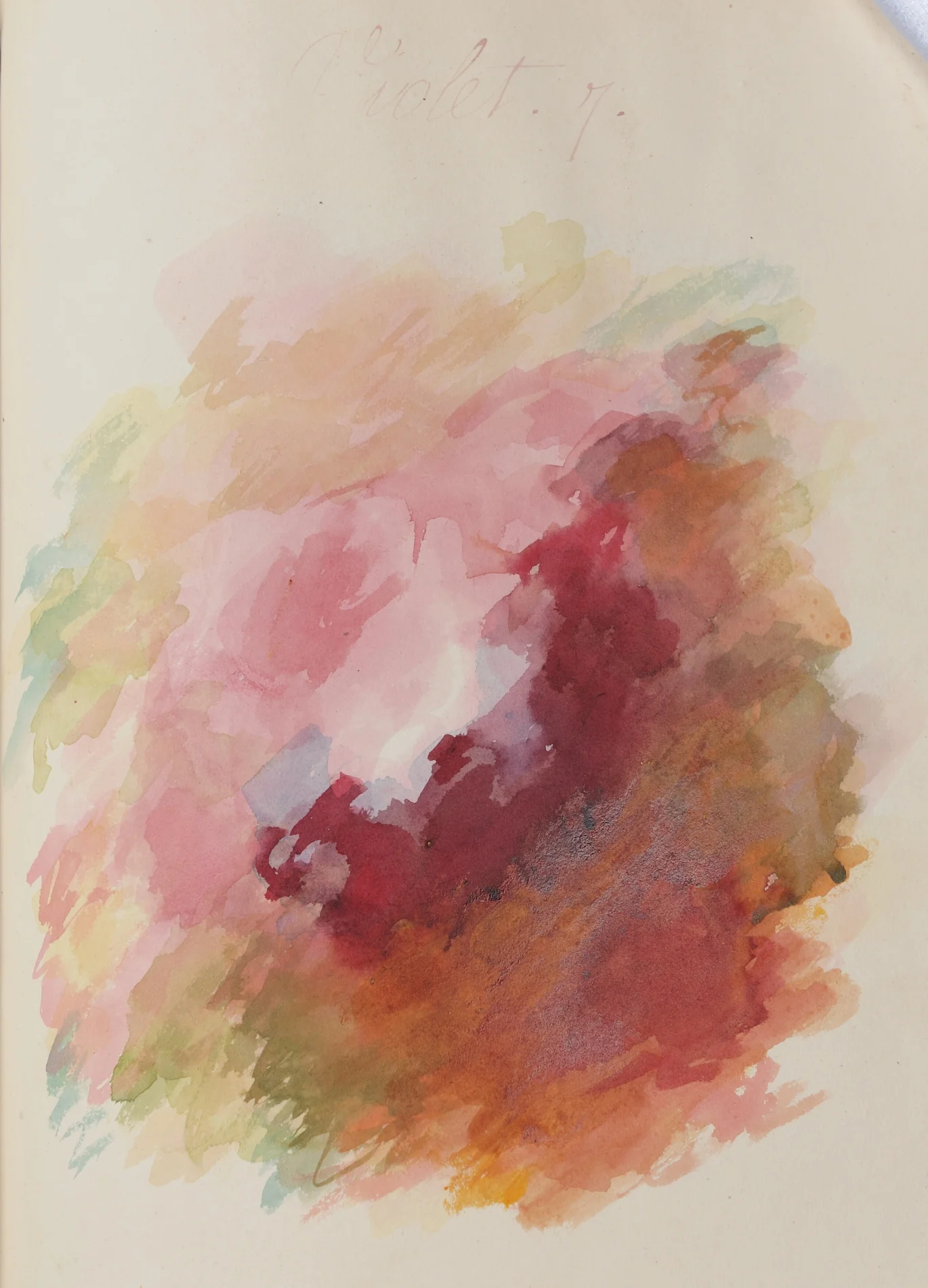
An Essay on Light and Shade, on Colours, and on Composition in General - her "Violet" blot

Between 1805 and 1808 Mary Gartside published three books on painting in watercolour that reflect her interest in colour theory and its applicability. She published An Essay on Light and Shade, privately in 1805.

She wrote Ornamental Groups, Descriptive of Flowers, Birds, Shells, Fruit, Insects etc,. published by William Miller in 1808; and the second, enlarged edition of her first book with the new title An Essay on a New Theory of Colour, published by Gardiner, Miller and Arch in 1808. It is clear that she had some education and in the book she mentions Samuel Tertius Galton's 1799 work “Experiments on Colours”, and the entomologist Moses Harris's “System of Colours”. She writes that readers "will see the whole range of pure and compound colours, and the contrasting tints to each, at one view". New Theory of Colour was intended as the first of a three-volume set, but volumes 2 and 3 never appeared. A 10-page pamphlet appears to have preceded An Essay on Light and Shade, and is titled An Essay on Light and Shadow. It does not contain the hand-coloured blots included in the later editions. Because each copy had to be individually painted it meant that every book was unique. One of the copies was for her patron Thomas Barrow and his copy was offered at auction in 2023.

Mary Gartside completed two drawings that were published in the third volume of Dru Drury's book Illustrations of Natural History.

== Review and commentary ==
One of the first scholars to have referenced and discussed her was Frederic Schmid in his book The Practice of Painting (London: Faber and Faber, 1948) and a related essay. Her work has recently been discussed by scholars such as Ian C. Bristow, Ann Bermingham, Martin Kemp, Jean-Jacques Rosat and Raphael Rosenberg.

Gartside is the subject of a poem by Amy Clampitt, entitled Balms, that appeared in the November 1980 issue of Poetry.

In 2013, a copy of An Essay on Light and Shade, on Colours, and on Composition in General was included in the exhibition Regency Colour and Beyond, 1785-1850 at the Royal Pavilion in Brighton. Mary Gartside was the focus of a research project, led by Alexandra Loske at the Centre for Life History and Life Writing Research at the University of Sussex about women in colour history. In January 2024, a monograph on Gartside, with focus on the so-called "Barrow copy" of her Essay on Light and Shade was published, Mary Gartside, c.1755-1819: Abstract Visions of Colour.

== Selected works ==
- An Essay on Light and Shade, on Colours, and on Composition in General (London, 1805)
- An Essay on a New Theory of Colours, and on Composition in General (London, 1808)
- Ornamental Groups, Descriptive of Flowers, Birds, Shells, Fruit, Insects, &c., and Illustrative of a New Theory of Colouring (London, W. Miller, 1808)
