= Polyrhaphis grandini =

Scientific classification
- Domain: Eukaryota
- Kingdom: Animalia
- Phylum: Arthropoda
- Class: Insecta
- Order: Coleoptera
- Suborder: Polyphaga
- Infraorder: Cucujiformia
- Family: Cerambycidae
- Genus: Polyrhaphis
- Species: P. grandini

Binomial name
- Polyrhaphis grandini Buquet, 1853

Species of beetle

Polyrhaphis grandini is a species of beetle in the family Cerambycidae. It was described by Buquet in 1853. It is known from Brazil.
