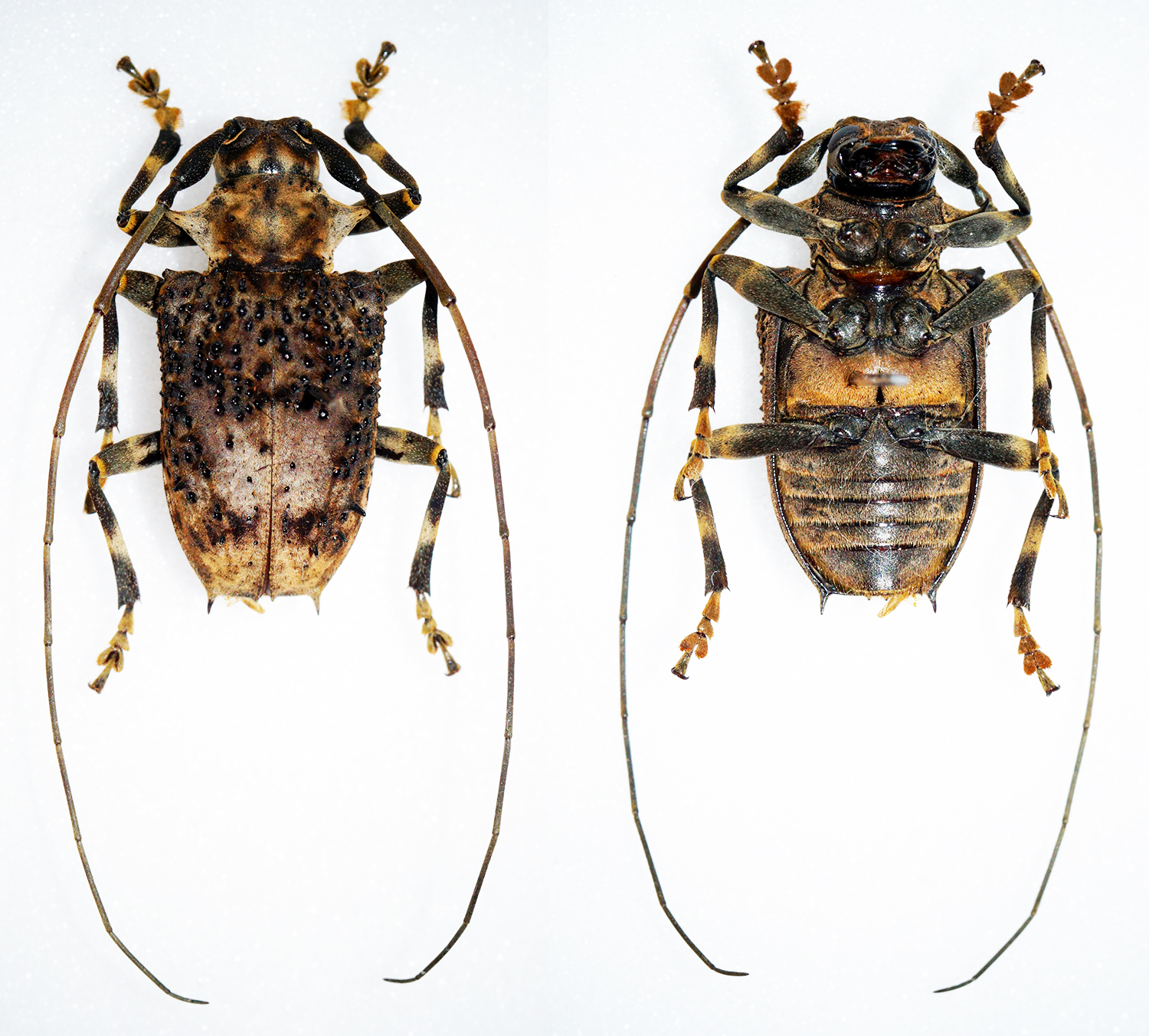

Scientific classification
- Domain: Eukaryota
- Kingdom: Animalia
- Phylum: Arthropoda
- Class: Insecta
- Order: Coleoptera
- Suborder: Polyphaga
- Infraorder: Cucujiformia
- Family: Cerambycidae
- Genus: Polyrhaphis
- Species: P. peruana

Binomial name
- Polyrhaphis peruana Santos-Silva, Martins & Tavakilian, 2010

= Polyrhaphis peruana =

Species of beetle

Polyrhaphis peruana is a species of beetle in the family Cerambycidae. It was described by Santos-Silva, Martins and Tavakilian in 2010.
