= Polyrhaphis olivieri =

Scientific classification
- Domain: Eukaryota
- Kingdom: Animalia
- Phylum: Arthropoda
- Class: Insecta
- Order: Coleoptera
- Suborder: Polyphaga
- Infraorder: Cucujiformia
- Family: Cerambycidae
- Genus: Polyrhaphis
- Species: P. olivieri

Binomial name
- Polyrhaphis olivieri Thomson, 1865

Species of beetle

Polyrhaphis olivieri is a species of beetle in the family Cerambycidae. It was described by James Thomson in 1865. It is known from French Guiana.
