= Oedudes callizona =

Scientific classification
- Domain: Eukaryota
- Kingdom: Animalia
- Phylum: Arthropoda
- Class: Insecta
- Order: Coleoptera
- Suborder: Polyphaga
- Infraorder: Cucujiformia
- Family: Cerambycidae
- Genus: Oedudes
- Species: O. callizona

Binomial name
- Oedudes callizona Bates, 1881

Species of beetle

Oedudes callizona is a species of beetle in the family Cerambycidae. It was described by Henry Walter Bates in 1881. It is known from Belize, Guatemala, Honduras and Mexico.
