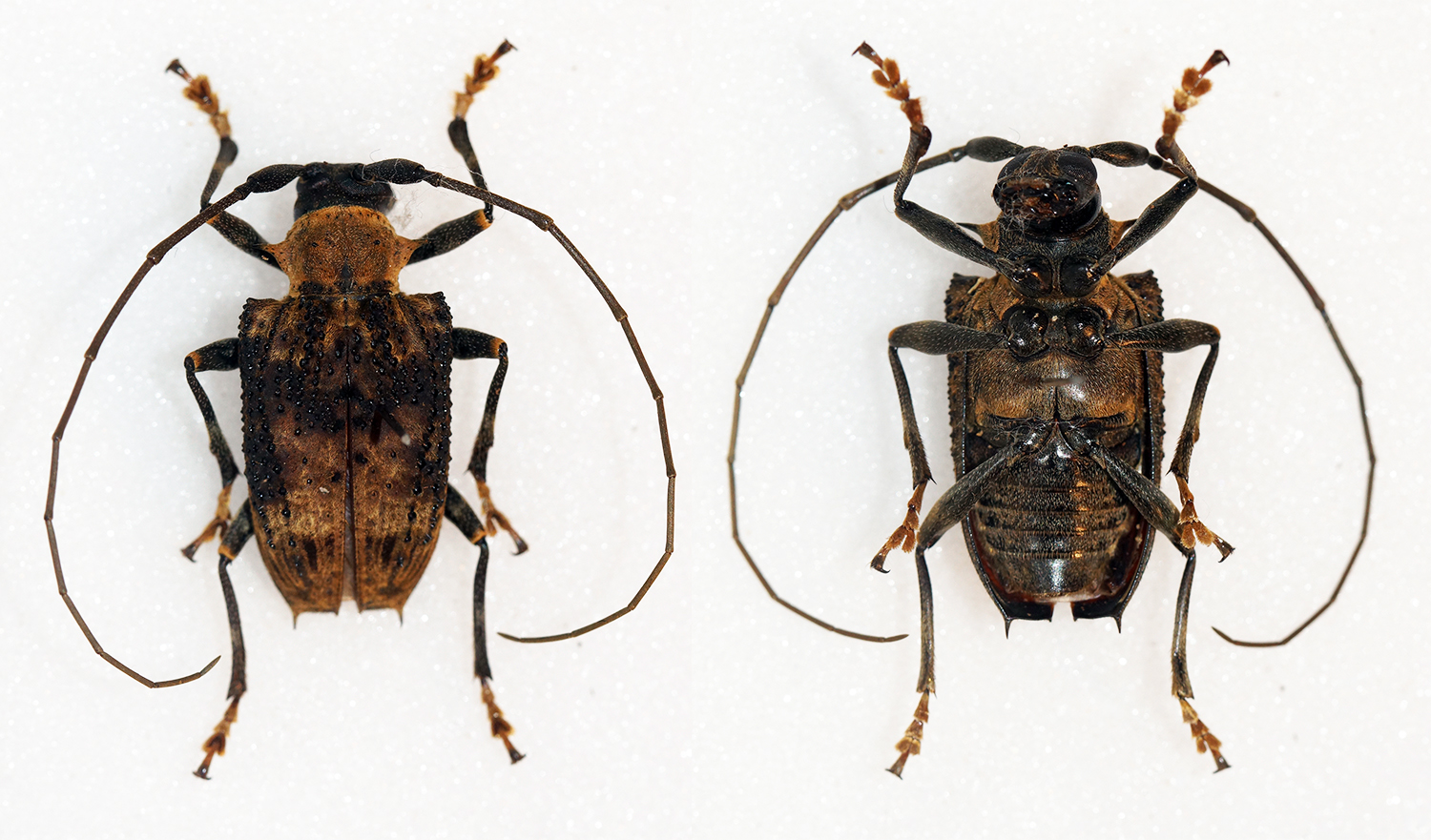

Scientific classification
- Domain: Eukaryota
- Kingdom: Animalia
- Phylum: Arthropoda
- Class: Insecta
- Order: Coleoptera
- Suborder: Polyphaga
- Infraorder: Cucujiformia
- Family: Cerambycidae
- Genus: Polyrhaphis
- Species: P. jansoni

Binomial name
- Polyrhaphis jansoni Pascoe, 1859

= Polyrhaphis jansoni =

Species of beetle

Polyrhaphis jansoni is a species of beetle in the family Cerambycidae. It was described by Francis Polkinghorne Pascoe in 1859. It is known from Ecuador and Brazil.
