= Polyrhaphis turnbowi =

Scientific classification
- Domain: Eukaryota
- Kingdom: Animalia
- Phylum: Arthropoda
- Class: Insecta
- Order: Coleoptera
- Suborder: Polyphaga
- Infraorder: Cucujiformia
- Family: Cerambycidae
- Genus: Polyrhaphis
- Species: P. turnbowi

Binomial name
- Polyrhaphis turnbowi Hovore & McCarty, 1998

Species of beetle

Polyrhaphis turnbowi is a species of beetle in the family Cerambycidae. It was described by Hovore and McCarty in 1998. It is known to be found in Panama.
