= Emma Sophia Galton =

Emma Sophia Galton (1811–1904) was the author of an 1863 book entitled a Guide to the Unprotected in Every-Day Matters Relating to Property and Income, which was published anonymously by Macmillan and credited to "A Banker's Daughter".

== Biography ==
Galton (1811–1904) was the fourth child of Samuel Tertius Galton and an elder sister of the eminent Victorian scientist Francis Galton.

In writing her financial guide, Galton noted that: "Many young people, and especially widows and single ladies, when they first possess money of their own, are in want of advice when they have commonplace business matters to transact. […] My aim throughout is to avoid all technicalities; to give plain and practical directions, not only as to what ought to be done, but how to do it." She went on to advise:

"When an inexperienced person comes into possession of her fortune, and especially if it be a small one, her first inquiry is, 'How can I invest my money so as to get the highest possible interest?' Let her rather seek to place it where her Capital will be safest. The Duke of Wellington used to say, 'High interest is another name for bad security.' In this country 4½ per cent is generally the highest safe Interest you can receive: 4 per cent, more usually so. When 6, 7, 8, or more per cent, is offered by Banks, Mortgages, Loans, or Mines, beware of accepting it, as the probability is that you will lose both your Principal and Interest, as so many have done. Such an Interest can seldom be given consistently with safety."

Galton advised women to "Seek a sensible and upright Friend, who is a good man of business". Her Guide went through seven editions between 1863 and 1900. Though new editions were advertised as 'revised', changes were minimal. Later versions included a page on the 'great change' of the 1882 Married Women's Property Act, which meant that a wife's money no longer belonged to her husband, and some additional material reflecting the greater variety of securities available in the late 19th century.

Galton's doubts concerning her brother Francis' theory of eugenics, a term he created, prompted him to write to her in defence of it telling her, "It is one of the few services that a man situated like myself can do, to take up an unpopular side when he knows it to be the true one". A copy of the correspondence between her and her brother is retained by the Wellcome Library.

== Legacy ==
The Victorian Women Writer's Project, hosted by Indiana University, has made a full transcription of the second edition of Galton's book (1864) available.

Galton's advice was reappraised in December 2016 by BBC Radio 4's personal finance radio programme Money Box, which reported that, "The book was probably the first general guide to finance, and certainly the first aimed at women who, like Emma herself, had found themselves with money of their own".
