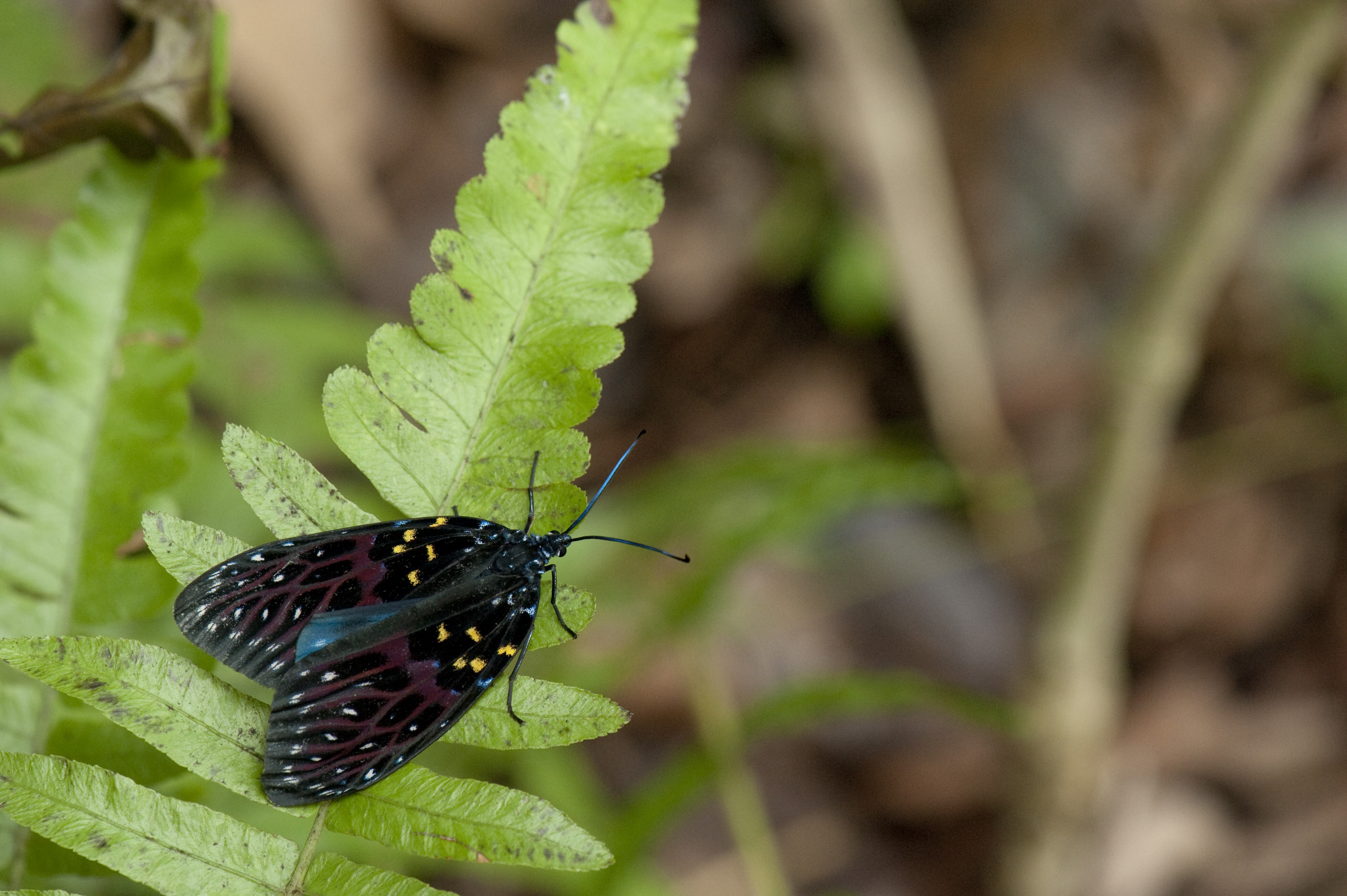
- Amesia sanguiflua

Scientific classification
- Domain: Eukaryota
- Kingdom: Animalia
- Phylum: Arthropoda
- Class: Insecta
- Order: Lepidoptera
- Family: Zygaenidae
- Genus: Amesia; Duncan, 1841

= Amesia (moth) =

Genus of moths

Amesia is a genus of moths belonging to the family Zygaenidae.

The species of this genus are found in Southeastern Asia.

== Species ==
Species:

- Amesia aliris Doubleday, 1847
- Amesia namouna Doubleday, 1847
- Amesia sanguiflua Drury, 1773
