= Samuel Tertius Galton =

British businessman and scientist (1783 - 1844)

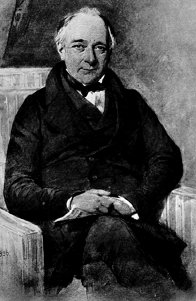
- Born: 23 March 1783
- Died: 23 October 1844 (aged 61)
- Occupations: businessman and scientist

Samuel Tertius Galton (23 March 1783 – 23 October 1844) was a British businessman and scientist.

== Life ==
He was the son of Samuel "John" Galton, a prominent member of the scientific Lunar Society, and the father of Francis Galton, the eminent Victorian scientist. He was born in the area of Duddeston in Birmingham. Samuel Tertius, though less distinguished, was not an exception to the rule of scientific endeavour in his family. In 1799 he published “Experiments on Colours” which was about colour theory. Mary Gartside mentions his work in her book An Essay on a New Theory of Colour in 1808.

Galton also inherited his father's considerable business interests and quickly set about making changes—discontinuing the family's armaments business in 1815. Though fascinated by economics (he wrote papers on the subject), Samuel preferred to be less 'hands-on' in the running of the business than his father and spent much of his time living off the revenue of his considerable estate.

== Family ==
Though brought up a Quaker, Samuel converted to Anglicanism in 1807. On 30 March 1807, he married Violetta (Francis Anne Viollette) Darwin, one of the fourteen children of his father's old colleague and fellow Lunar Society member Erasmus Darwin. Many of the 'Lunar children' grew up together and there were several such marriages. They had four daughters and three sons:

- Elizabeth Anne Galton (1808–1906), married Edward Wheler
- Lucy Harriot Galton (1809–1848), married James Moilliet
- Millicent Adele Galton (1810–1883), married the Rev Robert Shirley Bunbury
- Emma Sophia Galton (1811–1904)
- Darwin Galton (1814–1903). High Sheriff of Warwickshire in 1850.
- Erasmus Galton (1815–1909)
- Francis Galton (1822–1911)
