= Dru Drury =

British entomologist (1725–1804)

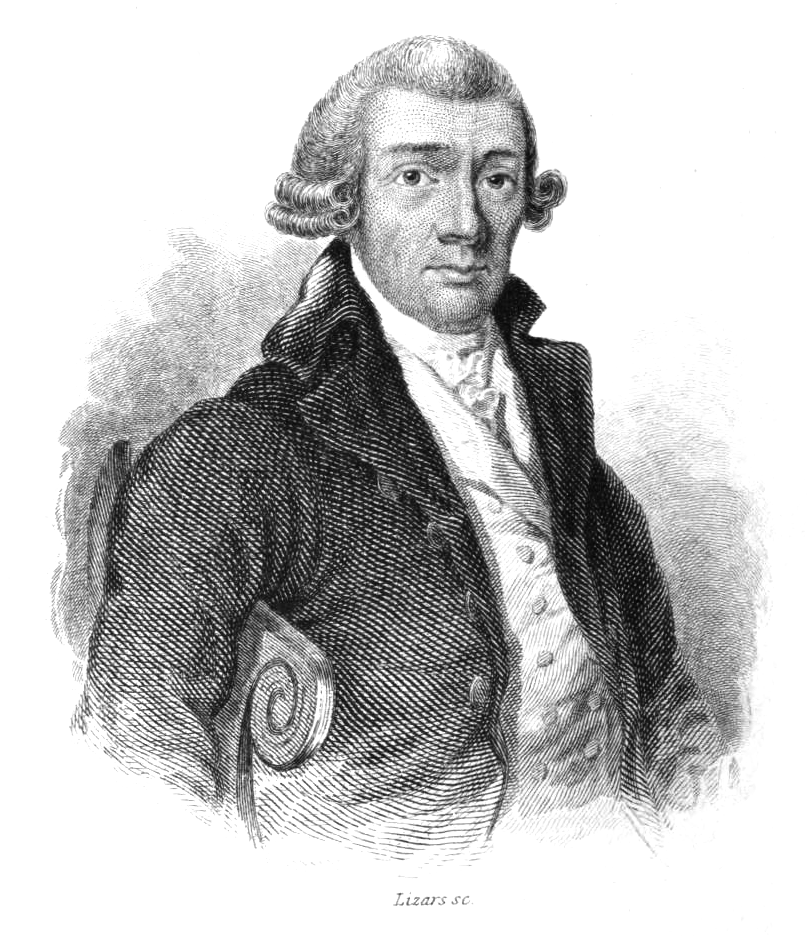
- From Jardine's The Naturalist's Library
- Born: 4 February 1725; Wood Street, London, England
- Died: 15 January 1804 (aged 78); Turnham Green, London, England
- Spouse: Esther Pedley

Dru Drury (4 February 1725 – 15 January 1804) was a British collector of natural history specimens and an entomologist. He received specimens collected from across the world through a network of ship's officers and collectors including Henry Smeathman. His collections were used by many entomologists of his time to describe and name new species and he is best known for his book Illustrations of Natural History which includes the names and descriptions of many insects, published in parts from 1770 to 1782 with most of the copperplate engravings done by Moses Harris.

== Life ==
Dru Drury was born in Wood Street, London. His father, also Dru Drury, was a citizen, goldsmith and silversmith of the City of London. Drury's great-grandfather, William, Lord of the Manor of Colne, was Sheriff of Cambridgeshire in 1676. The Drury family traced back to a Thomas Drury, of Fincham, Norfolk, who died in 1545. Descendants of Dru Drury retained the status of citizen and goldsmith of the City of London until at least 1969.

Drury apprenticed to his father in the Goldsmith's Company in 1739 and became a liveryman in 1751. In 1748 he married Esther, the daughter of his father's fourth wife from an earlier marriage to soapmaker John Pedley of London. Drury then inherited his father's business and became the owner of several freehold houses in London and Essex. By 1771 he was earning nearly £2000 a year and had amassed enough wealth to buy the entire stock of a fellow silversmith, Nathaniel Jeffreys. Despite his wealth, he was forced into bankruptcy in 1777 after he was cheated by two Yorkshire cutlers, William Tate and John Wheate. Assisted by Joseph Banks, John Fothergill, and other friends, he resumed business but retired in 1789 to devote all his time to entomology. Drury and his wife had three children, Mary, born 1749; William (who became a silversmith) born 1752; and Dru, born 1767. He spent his retirement between London and Broxbourne, Hertfordshire where he collected insect specimens. Around 1797 the family moved to Turnham Green but Drury began to face ill health starting with stones in his bladder. Other complications followed and he died in the home of his son in the Strand on 15 January 1804. He was buried at St. Martin-in-the-Fields on 21 January.

== Natural history career ==
Drury was keenly interested in entomology even before retiring as a silversmith and was the president of the Society of Entomologists of London from 1780 to 1782. He was also a member of the Linnean Society. Beginning in 1770, Drury corresponded with a number of entomologists from all over the world from India to Jamaica and America. He offered 6 dimes for any insect of any size from officers of merchant ships travelling afar. He also had a three-page pamphlet on instructions for collecting. It is through these connections that Drury received much of his collection.

(26) To Mr. Keuchan, at Jamaica. June 13, 1774.

You inquire after Mr. Smeathman, who is settled on the Coast of Africa. He, has been there almost three years but has sent nothing over except insects, a circumstance which astonishes us, for his patrons expected a great variety of subjects long before this in ye different branches of Natural History. Many of the insects that he has sent are surprisingly fine. A great number entirely new, especially among, the Coleoptera, some of which are very large.

--From a collection of letters published in The Scientific Monthly.

From 1770 to 1782, he published the three-part Illustrations of Natural History, Wherein are Exhibited Upwards of 240 Figures of Exotic Insects, with copperplates by Moses Harris and Peter Mazell. This was later revised and republished under the title Illustrations of Exotic Entomology in 1837. A German translation of the first volume was published by Georg W. F. Panzer. Drury's work was self-published and many of his correspondences with various workmen in the publishing industry have survived. In the letters, detailed accounts of prices and publishing techniques are provided which shed light on Britain's early printing industry. The original drawings for this book, by Moses Harris and Mary Gartside, were recently rediscovered in rural Virginia, USA.

One of Drury's special hunts was for a specimen of the Goliath beetle. A specimen had been obtained by William Hunter and was lent to Emanuel Mendes da Costa. Da Costa had drawings of the beetle made by Moses Harris but before it could be published he was embroiled in an embezzlement scandal in the Royal Society which led to a prison term. The drawing however was bought by Drury and it went into Drury's book with Westwood's name of Goliathus druryi. Hunter was understandably angry with what he saw as "theft" and Drury subsequently made a special search for another specimen of the beetle. A specimen was sent by Henry Smeathman but Drury misidentified it. Drury was also interested in rocks and minerals and took a special interest in the distribution of gold around the world. He also took an interest in gardening, angling in the River Lea, and in making his own wines.

Drury's collection comprised over 11,000 specimens. Many species were described and given their binomial names by contemporary entomologists like J.C. Fabricius, Ernest Olivier, and Kirby:

there may be in Holland collections more numerous, having in many instances a great number of a single species, yet no collection abounds with such a wonderful variety in all the different genera as this. All the specimens of which it is composed, are in the highest and most exquisite state of preservation, such an extensive collection can be supposed to be, and a very considerable number are unique, such as are not to be found in any other Cabinet whatever, and of considerable value; many of which, coming from countries exceedingly unhealthy, where the collectors, in procuring them, have perished by the severity of the climate, give but little room to expect any duplicate will ever be obtained during the present age; and the learned quotations that have been taken from it by those celebrated authors Linnaeus and Fabricius, in all their late editions, are incontestable proofs of the high degrees of estimation they entertained of it.

— From a printed circular which Drury distributed with a view to the sale of the collection in 1788

After his death, the collections were sold in a three-day auction by King and Lochee and earned £614 8s. 6d. with an additional £300 for his cabinets and books. A catalogue of the collections was published. Unfortunately, Drury's collections, while large, lacked substantial location and other data (as it was not customary at the time). Thus, it is difficult, if not impossible, for any sound scientific data to be formed in regards to the history of its specimens.

Plates from Illustrations of Exotic Entomology

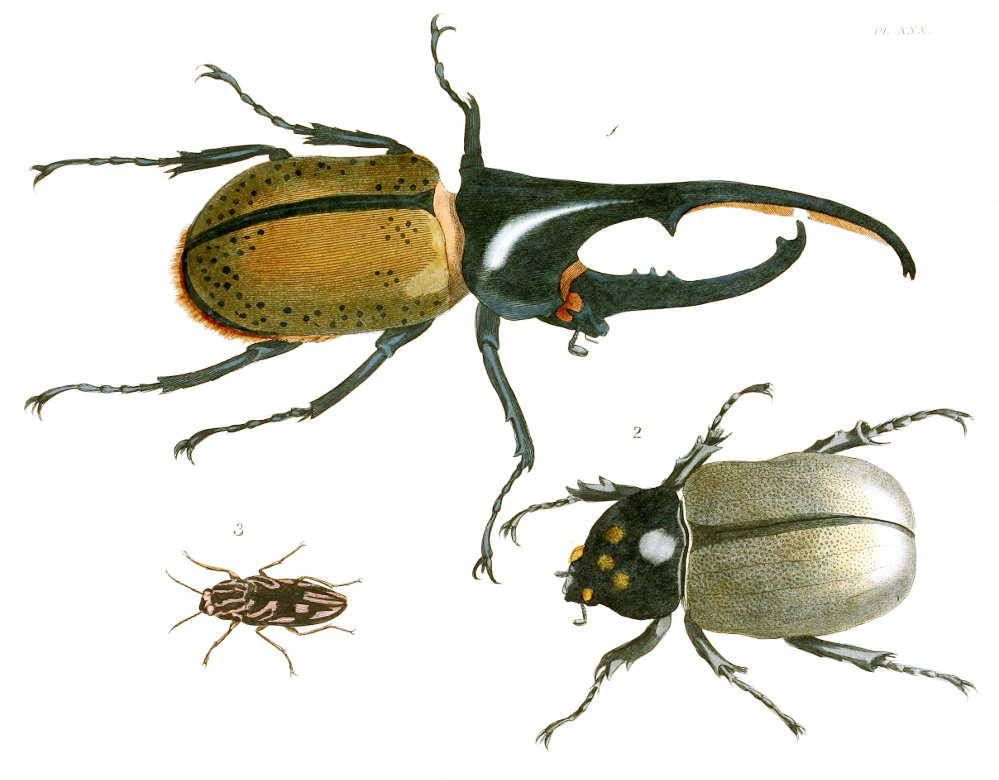
Hercules beetle

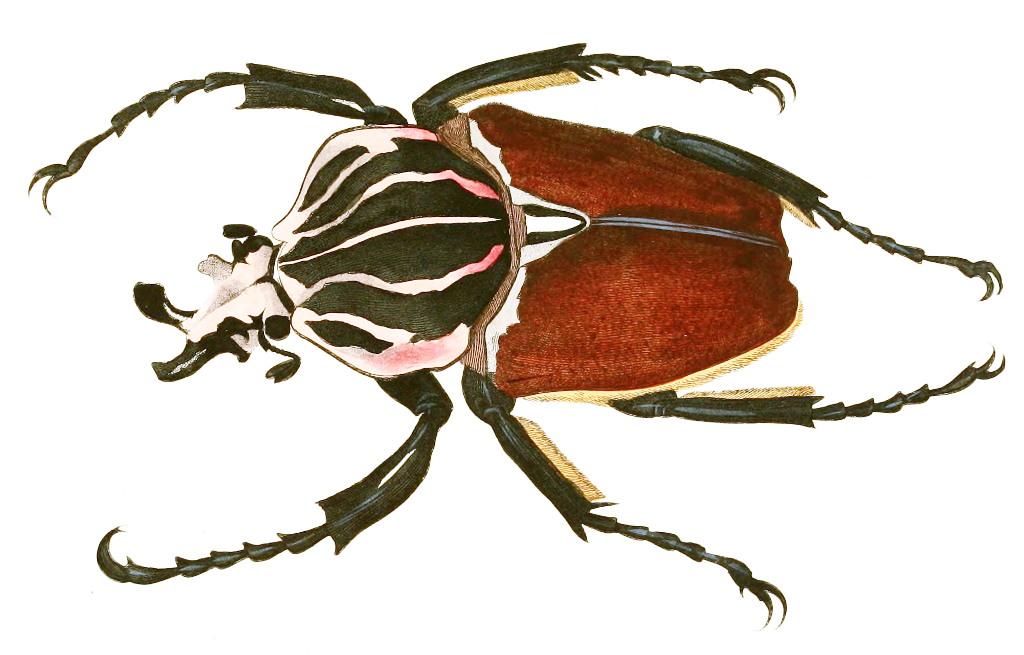
Goliath beetle

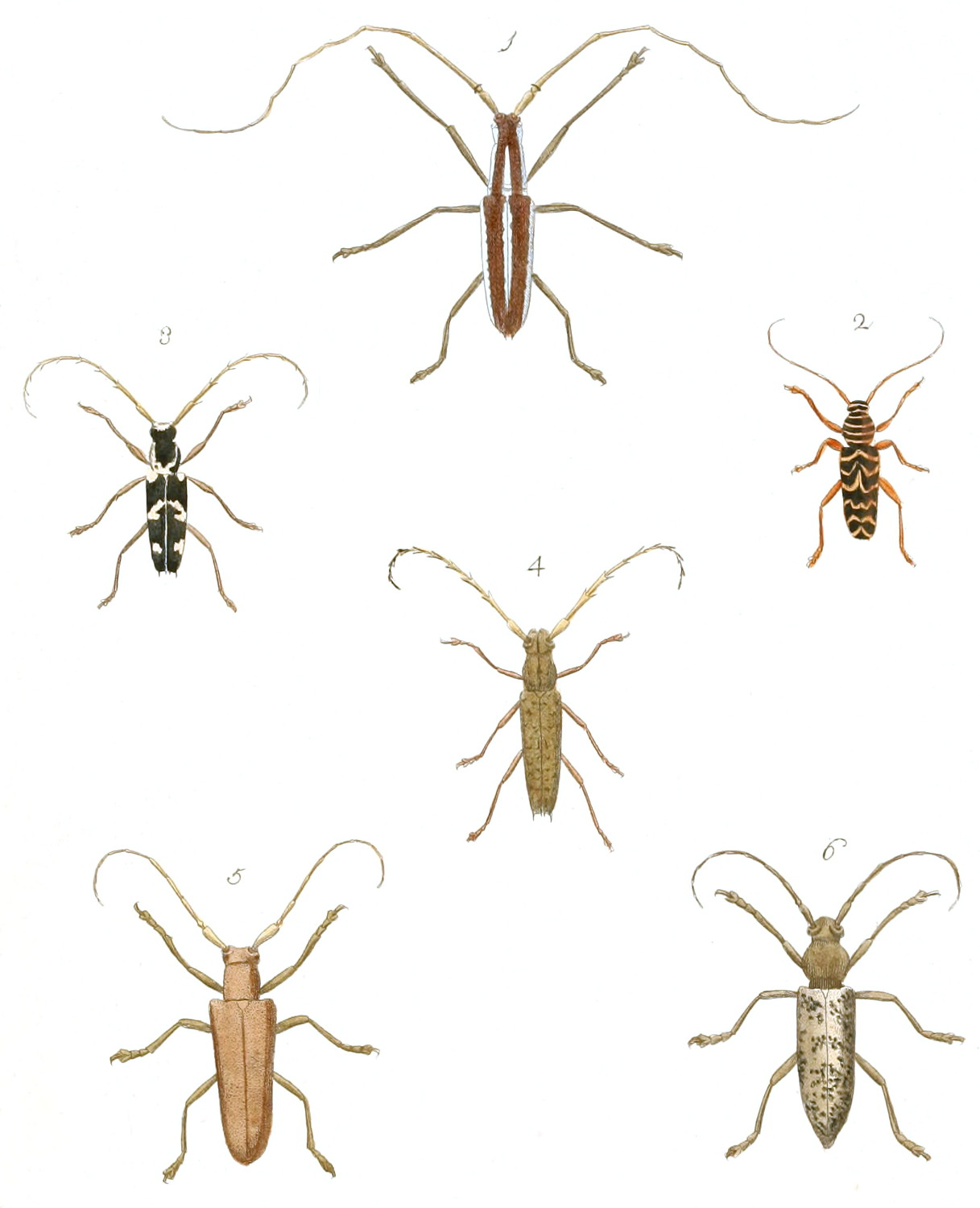
Longhorn beetles

Charaxes and other butterflies

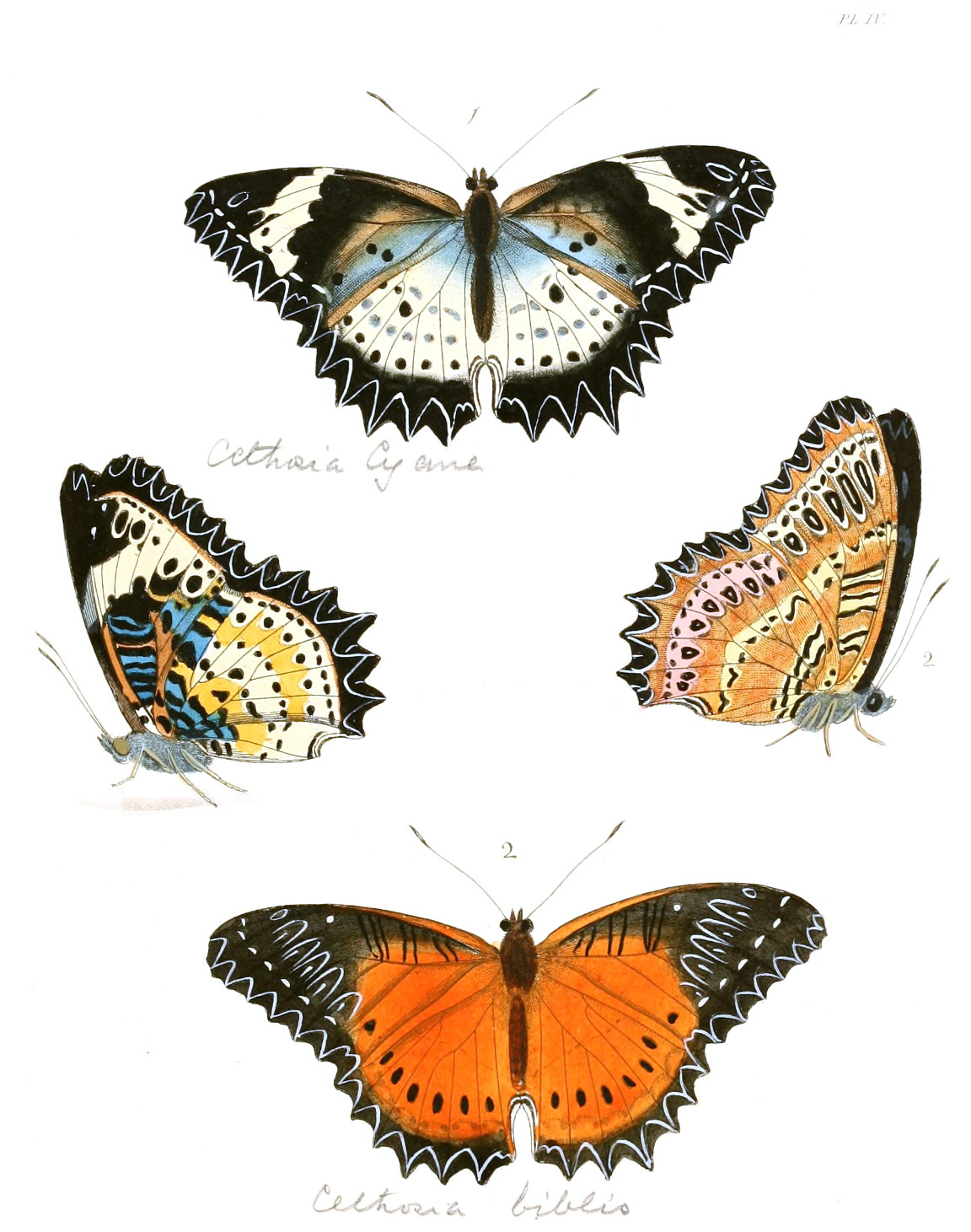
Cethosia species

Pipevine swallowtail and black swallowtail

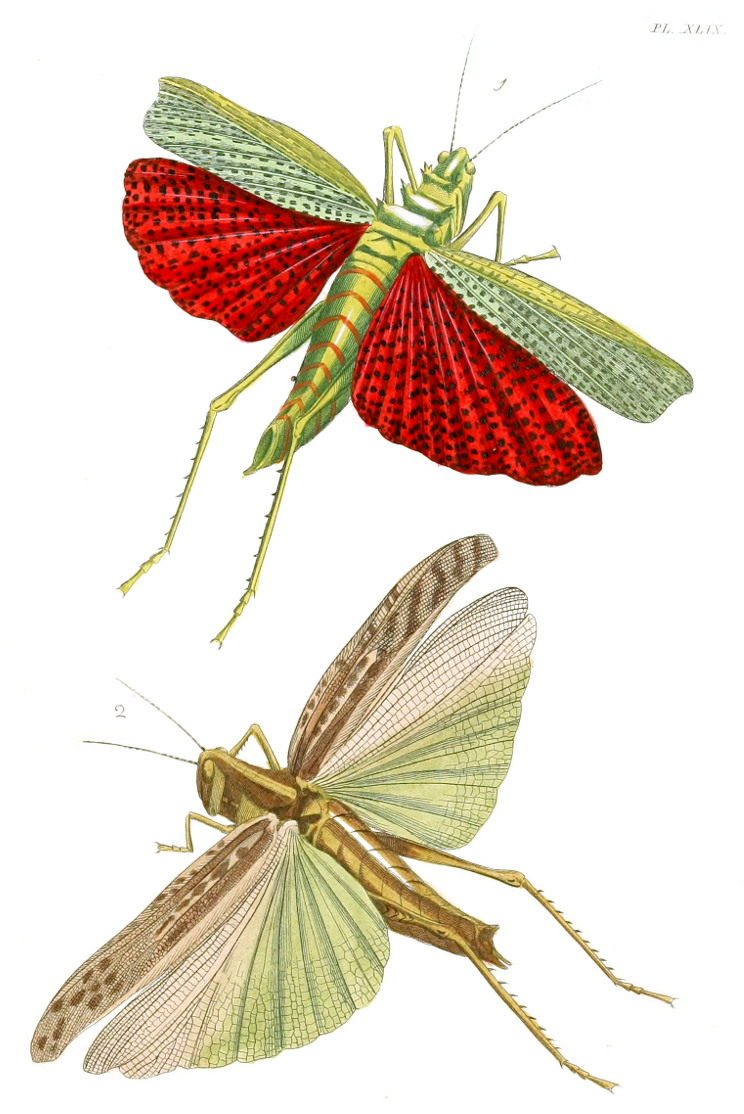
Locusts

Black witch and salt marsh moths

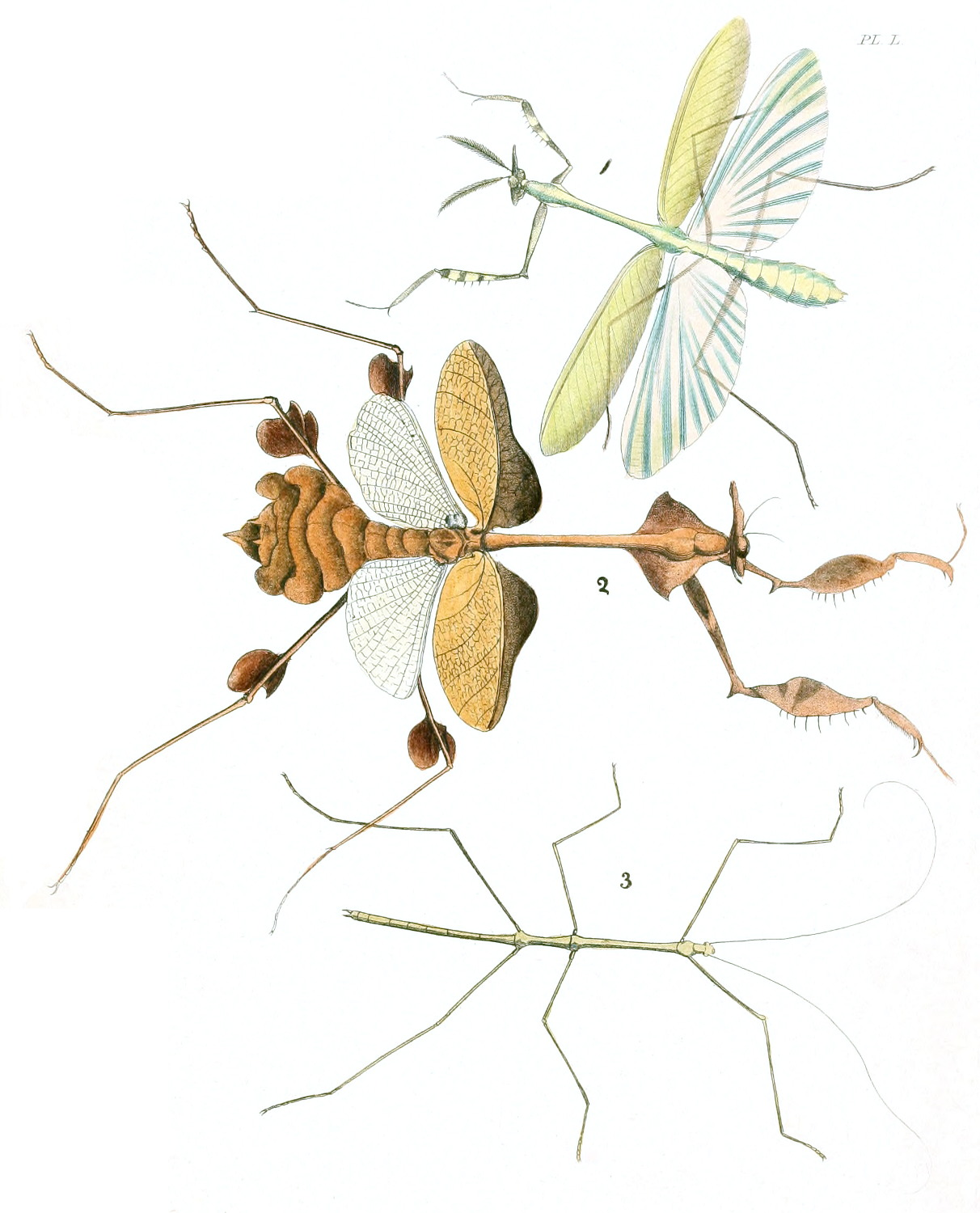
Mantids and walkingstick

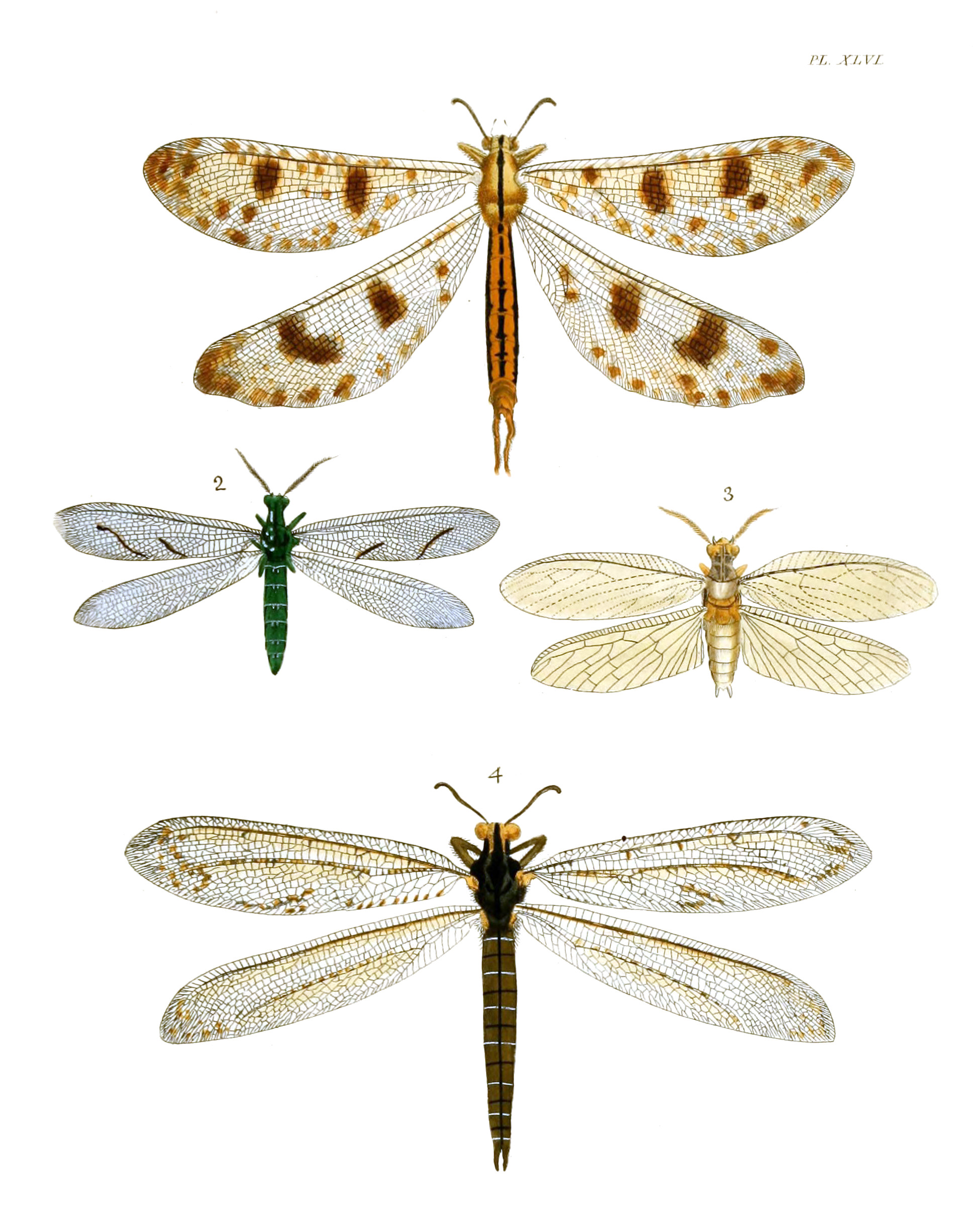
Neuroptera

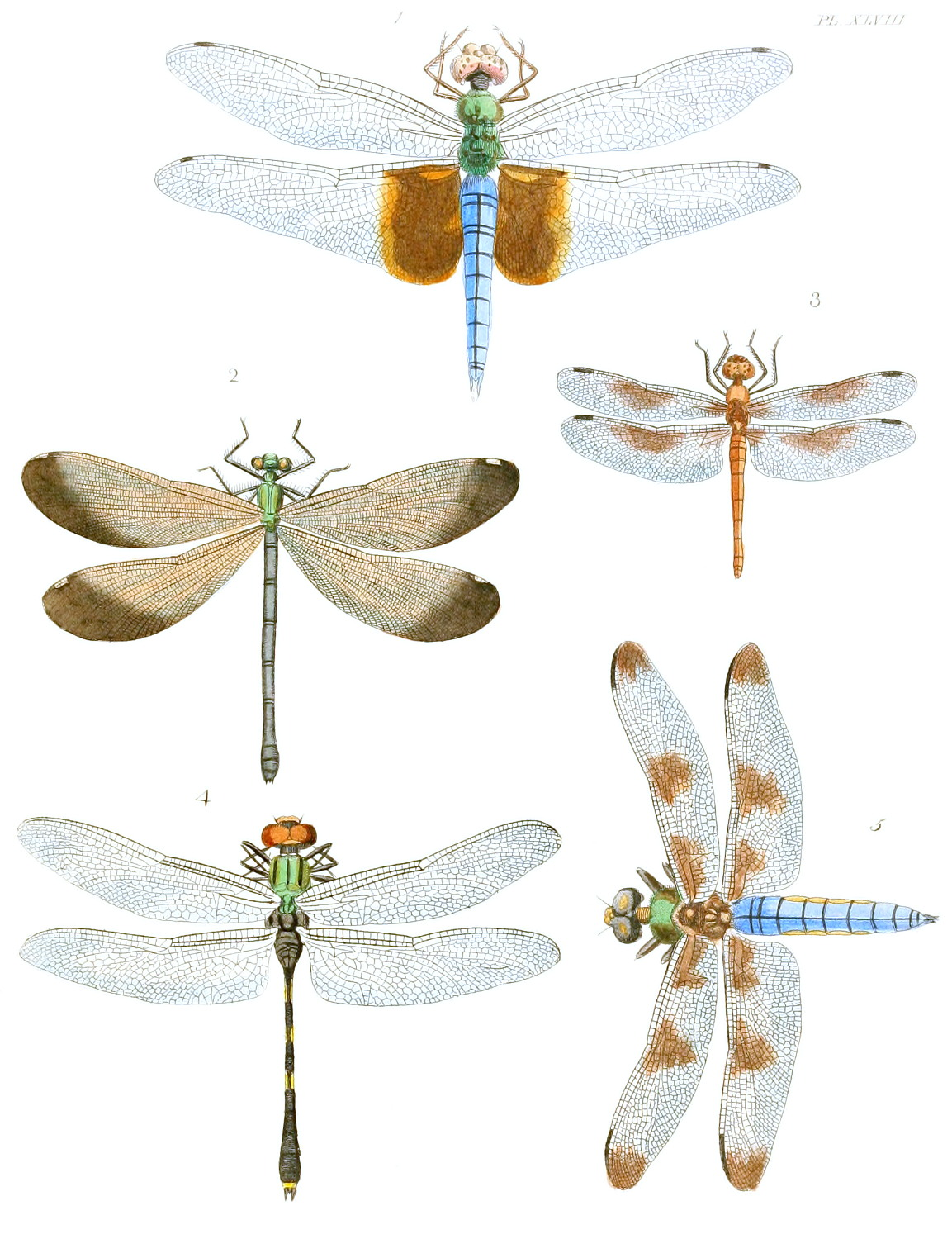
Odonata

Drury's illustrations, mostly by Moses Harris, were published in three volumes (1770, 1773, 1782), and the original paintings, inherited through his descendants, were sold at auction in London in March 1964. They are now in the Oak Spring Garden Library, Upperville, Virginia USA.

== Other sources ==
- Evenhuis, N.L. 1997. Litteratura Taxonomica Dipterorum. Leiden: Backhuys Publishers. 209–212
- Gilbert, P. 2000: Butterfly Collectors and Painters. Four Centuries of Colour Plates from the Library Collections of the Natural History Museum, London. Singapore, Beaumont Publishing Pte Ltd : X+166 S. 27–28, Portr., 88–89, 140–141, 148–149: Lep.Tafel
- Griffin, F. J. (1940). "The first entomological societies. An early chapter in entomological history in England". Proceedings of the Royal Entomological Society of London A. 15 (7–9): 49–68. doi:10.1111/j.1365-3032.1940.tb00591.x.
- Heppner, J. B. (1982). "Dates of selected Lepidoptera literature for the western hemisphere fauna" (PDF). Journal of the Lepidopterists' Society. 36 (2): 87–111.
- Brewster, David, ed. (1830). "Entomology". Edinburgh Encyclopaedia. Vol. 9. p. 66. doi:10.5962/bhl.title.30911.
- Osborn, H. 1952: A Brief History of Entomology Including Time of Demosthenes and Aristotle to Modern Times with over Five Hundred Portraits Columbus, Ohio, The Spahr & Glenn Company : 1–303.
- Salmon, M. A. 2000 The Aurelian Legacy. British Butterflies and their Collectors. – Martins, Great Horkesley : Harley Books : 1–432
