= John Paul II (disambiguation) =

Pope John Paul II (Karol Józef Wojtyła; 1920–2005) was the first Polish pope of the Roman Catholic church.

John Paul II also may refer to:

- Kraków John Paul II International Airport (IATA airport code: KRK; ICAO airport code: EPKK), Cracow, Poland
- João Paulo II Airport (IATA airport code: PPL; ICAO airport code: LPPD), Sao Miguel, Azores
- John Paul II Bridge (disambiguation)
- Holy Father John Paul II Family Home in Wadowice, Poland
- John Paul II Centre (disambiguation)
- John Paul II Institute (disambiguation)
- John Paul II Foundation, for Development and International Cooperation
- John Paul II Foundation for Research and Treatment, a hospital
- John Paul II Museum (disambiguation)
- John Paul II Park (disambiguation)
- John Paul II University (disambiguation)
- John Paul II Catholic School (disambiguation)
- John Paul II Collegiate, North Battleford, Saskatchewan, Canada
- John Paul II Minor Seminary, Barangay San Luis, Antipolo City, Rizal, Philippines
- Credo: John Paul II, a 2005 music videodisc by Andrea Bocelli

== See also ==
- Saint John Paul II (disambiguation)
- Pope John Paul II (disambiguation)
- Karol Wojtyla (disambiguation)
- Juan Pablo II (disambiguation)
- João Paulo II (disambiguation)
- John Paul (disambiguation), including John Paul Jr.
- John II (disambiguation)
- Paul II (disambiguation)
- Paul John (disambiguation)
