= Pope John Paul II High School =

John Paul II High School, or any other combinations with or without the words Catholic, Pope, or Saint refers to several Catholic secondary schools named after John Paul II, Pope from 1978 to 2005, canonised as a saint in 2014. Some were renamed to include "Saint" or "the Great" rather than "Pope" after the canonisation.

== Canada ==
- John Paul II High School, Fort Saskatchewan, Alberta
- John Paul II Collegiate High school, North Battleford, Saskatchewan
- St. John Paul II Catholic Secondary School, Toronto, Ontario
- John Paul II Catholic Secondary School, London, Ontario

== United States ==
- St. John Paul II Catholic High School (Alabama), located in Huntsville, Alabama
- St. John Paul II Catholic High School (Arizona), located in Avondale, Arizona
- Saint John Paul II Academy (formerly Pope John Paul II High School), located in Boca Raton, Florida
- St. John Paul II Catholic High School (Florida), located in Tallahassee, Florida
- Pope John Paul II Catholic High School (Louisiana), located in Slidell, Louisiana
- St. John Paul II High School (Massachusetts), located in Hyannis, Massachusetts
- John Paul II Catholic High School (North Carolina), located in Greenville, North Carolina
- Pope John Paul II High School (Pennsylvania), located in Royersford, Pennsylvania
- Pope John Paul II High School (Tennessee), located in Hendersonville, Tennessee
- St. John Paul II High School (Corpus Christi, Texas)
- John Paul II High School (Plano, Texas), located in Plano, Texas
- John Paul II Catholic High School (Schertz, Texas)
- Saint John Paul the Great Catholic High School, located in Dumfries, Virginia
- Pope John Paul II High School (Washington), located in Lacey, Washington

== Other countries ==
- John Paul II High School, Greymouth, New Zealand
- John Paul II High School in Tarnów, Poland

== See also ==
- John Paul II Catholic School (disambiguation)
- Pope John Paul II (disambiguation)
