= John Paul II Catholic School =

John Paul II Catholic School or Saint John Paul II Catholic School may refer to:

== United States ==
- St. John Paul II Catholic School (South Carolina)
- St. John Paul II Catholic High School (Alabama)
- St. John Paul II Catholic High School (Arizona)
- St. John Paul II Catholic High School (Florida)
- St. John Paul II High School (Massachusetts)
- St. John Paul II High School (Corpus Christi, Texas)
- Saint John Paul the Great Catholic High School, in Potomac Shores, Virginia
- John Paul II Catholic School (Houston)
- John Paul II Catholic High School (North Carolina)
- John Paul II High School (Plano, Texas)
- John Paul II Catholic High School (Schertz, Texas)
- Pope John Paul II High School (Tennessee)
- Pope John Paul II High School (Pennsylvania)
- Pope John Paul II Catholic High School (Louisiana)
- Pope John Paul II High School (Washington)

== New Zealand ==
- John Paul II High School, Greymouth, New Zealand

== Australia ==
- St John Paul II Catholic College, in Sydney, New South Wales

== Canada ==
- St. John Paul II Catholic Secondary School, in Toronto, Ontario

== Poland ==
- John Paul II High School in Tarnów

== See also ==
- John Paul II Catholic University of Lublin
- John Paul II Institute
- John Paul II Minor Seminary
- John Paul the Great Catholic University
- Pontifical University of John Paul II
- Pope John Paul II High School (disambiguation)
