= List of places named after Pope John Paul II =

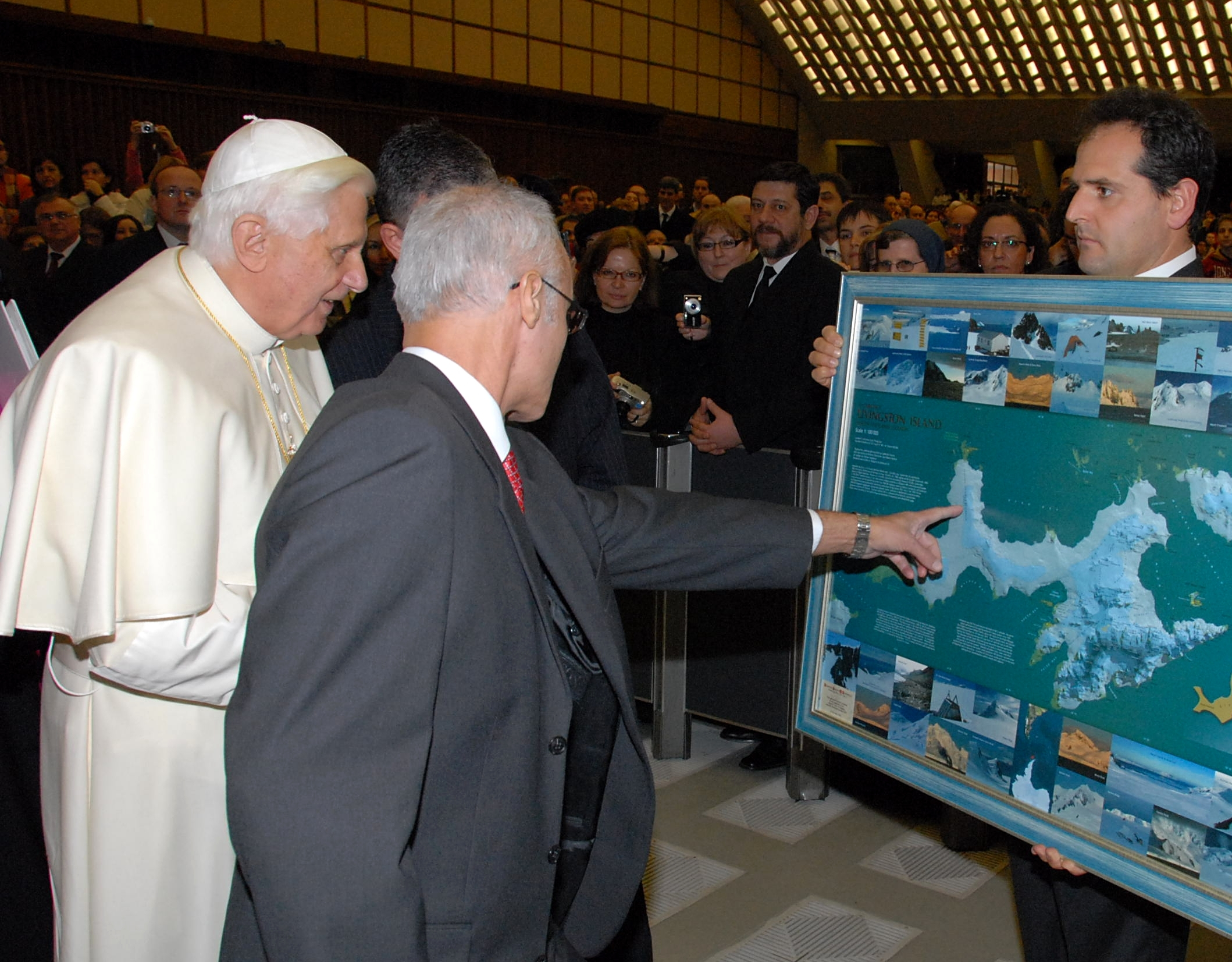
Pope Benedict XVI is shown a map of Ioannes Paulus II Peninsula in Antarctica.

Pope John Paul II was celebrated during his lifetime and later posthumously with several honours and as the namesake of several places and institutions. Such places often bear the name John Paul II but newer institutions are using the name John Paul the Great.

The historic house museum located in his family home in Wadowice, Poland is called the Holy Father John Paul II Family Home in Wadowice.

Educational and cultural centres named in honour of the Pope include the John Paul II Pontifical Theological Institute for Marriage and Family Sciences whose largest campuses are located at the Lateran University in Rome, Italy and Catholic University of America in Washington, DC, United States. Affiliated campuses are found in Australia, Benin, Brazil, India, Mexico and Spain. There is also a Saint John Paul II National Shrine in the United States capital. John Paul the Great Catholic University is a rededicated degree-granting institution in San Diego, California. Several John Paul II Catholic Centres may be found on college and university campuses around the world, usually serving students and staff as Roman Catholic chapels. Several elementary and secondary schools also use the name John Paul II or John Paul the Great, like Pope John Paul the Great Catholic High School in Prince William County, Virginia, administered by the Dominican Sisters of Saint Cecilia or "Nashville Dominicans." (The tabernacle and cornerstone of the school were blessed by Pope Benedict XVI during Mass at Nationals Park in Washington, D.C., on 17 April 2008.)

Several national and municipal public projects were named in honour of the Pope. Rome's main railway station, the Roma Termini station, was dedicated to Pope John Paul II by a vote of the City Council, a first municipal public object in Rome bearing the name of a non Italian. International airports named after him are John Paul II International Airport Kraków-Balice — one of the principal airports of Poland, Bari International Airport-Karol Wojtyla in Bari, Italy, and the João Paulo II Airport in the Azores. The Juan Pablo II Bridge is located in Chile, while John Paul II Square in Bulgaria denotes the Pope's visit to Sofia in 2002. Estádio João Paulo II (John Paul II Stadium) is a football (soccer) stadium in Mogi-Mirim in Brazil. Parvis Notre-Dame - Place Jean-Paul II is a centrepiece of one of Paris' neighbourhoods. Pope John Paul II Park is a feature of Boston, Massachusetts while Pope John Paul II Drive serves residents of Chicago, Illinois. In San Diego, California, New Catholic University has renamed itself John Paul the Great Catholic University.

In the Philippines, the Parish of Jesus, the Way the Truth and the Life near SM Mall of Asia in Pasay is also called the John Paul II International Youth Centre. When the Vatican's Secretary for Relations with States, Archbishop Jean Louis Tauran went to the country, he was greeted by the youth from all the Suffragan Dioceses of the Archdiocese of Manila there. In Pasig Catholic College, one of the main exit gates for High School Students is named "Pope John Paul II Gate". This gate immediately leads to the Bishop's estate and The Immaculate Conception Cathedral. In Bacolod, a tower was dedicated to him at the Reclamation area near SM City Bacolod and was named The Pope John Paul II Tower. It is the city's highest structure. In the Diocese of San Jose, Nueva Ecija there is a five-hectare complex named St. John Paul II Sanctuary of the Divine Mercy. It presently has an institution for abandoned elderly called Tahanan ng Damayang Kristiyano (House of Christian Solidarity). In the future a shrine of the Divine Mercy will be constructed as well as a youth center which would be called the YOUCAT Center- a center for coordination and formation using the Youth Catechism of the Catholic Church as a tool for evangelization of the young.

Of international interest, Ioannes Paulus II Peninsula on Livingston Island in the South Shetland Islands was named in honour of the Pope. The Antarctic landmark recognises his contribution to world peace and understanding among people.

== Buildings ==
=== Churches and chapels ===
==== Czech Republic ====
- A chapel of Blessed John Paul II in the Hospice of Saint John Neumann in Prachatice, Czech Republic, since 2011-05-01 (dedication celebration began on 4:00 p. m.)
- A new 2013 church in Bukovany, Czech Republic (instead of originally intended patrocinium to Saint Martin). The church should be donated to the church or to the municipality by local benefactor and entrepreneur Josef Kouřil, currently owner of a toy manufacture Wiki Kyjov. The church should by managed by Roman Catholic Church but should be used also by non-catholic churches and for cultural events.

==== Indonesia ====
- Gereja Katolik Santo Yohanes Paulus II, Kubu Raya Regency, Pontianak, West Kalimantan
- Paroki (Parish) Santo Yohannes Paulus II Tuntungan, Medan, North Sumatra

==== Canada ====
- St. John Paul II Church, Dartmouth, Nova Scotia, Canada
- Pope John Paull II School, Saskatoon, Saskatchewan

==== United States ====
- Parish (and Church) of Blessed John Paul, Adams, Massachusetts, USA
- St. John Paul II Church, Mount Olive, Illinois, USA
- St. John Paul II University Parish, Denton, Texas, USA
- Patron saint of Totus Tuus Maria Household, Steubenville, Ohio, USA
- St. John Paul II Parish, Southbridge, Massachusetts, USA
- St. John Paul II Parish Cedar Springs, Michigan, USA
- St. John Paul II Academy Boca Raton, Florida, USA

=== Schools ===
==== Australia ====
- John Paul II Catholic Primary School Clarendon Vale, Hobart, Tasmania
- John Paul College in Daisy Hill, Queensland
- St Andrews College - John Paul II Campus, Marayong, NSW
- John Paul II Institute for Marriage and Family in Melbourne, Australia

==== Brazil ====
- In Brasília, there is a Marist School: Colégio Marista João Paulo II.
- In Mauá, there is a Public School : Escola Estadual João Paulo II.

==== Canada ====
- In Fort Saskatchewan, Alberta. (John Paul II Catholic High School)
- In Okotoks, Alberta. (Pope John Paul II Collegiate)
- In Barrie, Ontario. (Pope John Paul II Catholic School)
- In London, Ontario. (John Paul II Catholic Secondary School)
- In Hamilton, Ontario. (Pope John Paul II Catholic Elementary School)
- In Hammond, Ontario. (Pope John Paul II Catholic Elementary School)
- In Oakville, Ontario. (Pope John Paul II Catholic Elementary School)
- In Richmond Hill, Ontario. (Pope John Paul II Catholic Elementary School)
- In Scarborough, Ontario. (St. John Paul II Catholic Secondary School, originally Pope John Paul II Catholic Secondary School - founded 1983)
- In Thunder Bay, Ontario. (Pope John Paul II School)
- In North Battleford, Saskatchewan. (John Paul II Collegiate)

==== Costa Rica ====
- In San José, Costa Rica: John Paul II Bridge

==== Czech Republic ====
- In Prague: Církevní střední zdravotnická škola Jana Pavla II. (Church Secondary Paramedical School of John Paul II), New Town, Ječná street, established by Prague Archbishopry
- In Hradec Králové: Základní škola a mateřská škola Jana Pavla II. (Elementary School and Kindergarten of John Paul II), a church school established by Hradec Králové Bishopry

==== India ====
- Pope John Paul II College of Education, Pondicherry, Puducherry
- Pope John Paul Shrine, Mangalore, Karnataka

==== Indonesia ====
- Gedung Karol Wojtyła in Atma Jaya Catholic University of Indonesia, Jakarta
- Seminari Tinggi KAJ Yohanes Paulus II (Archdiocese of Jakarta Diocesan Seminary) Jakarta
- Sekolah Menengah Agama Katolik (SMAK) Seminari Yohanes Paulus II Labuan Bajo, East Nusa Tenggara
- SMAK Yohanes Paulus II, Larantuka, East Nusa Tenggara

==== Ireland ====
- Pope John Paul II National School, in Malahide, County Dublin
- Scoil Eoin Phóil, Leixlip

==== Italy ====
- In Rome, the John Paul II Center for Interreligious Dialogue at the Angelicum University.
- In Cesena.
- In Ostia.
- In Lecce.
- In Cimbro-Cuirone, in the Province of Varese; it's the first school named Giovanni Paolo II (since 2005-12-28).
- In Peschiera del Garda, in the Province of Verona.
- In Tropea, in the Province of Vibo Valentia.

==== Mexico ====
- In Puebla, in the province of Tehuacan, Colegio Karol Wojtyla

==== New Zealand ====
- John Paul II High School (Greymouth) in Greymouth
- John Paul College, Rotorua

==== Philippines ====
- In Valenzuela City, a building in Our Lady of Fátima University Valenzuela (main) campus is named Pope John Paul II (PJP) Building. Similarly, another building of the same school in Quezon City (Lagro annex) also bears the same name.
- In Parañaque, St. John Paul II Academy of Parañaque was named after him in 2011, formerly known as STI Academy of Parañaque.
- In Davao City, John Paul II College of Davao was also named after him and the campus was launched in 2000.
- In Cebu City, Juan Luna Avenue, which passes the three diocesan seminaries and a church, was renamed after Blessed John Paul II.
- In Kidapawan City, a church named Blessed John Paull II Quasi-Parish, formerly known as Jesus the Good shepherd Quasi-parish with a big statue of the Pope.
- In Las Piñas, a hospital, the Pope John Paul Hospital and Medical Center, opened in 2018.
- In Quezon City, the church inside the Eastwood City central business district is named the Blessed John Paul II Parish.
- In Pasay, the basement of Archdiocesan Shrine of Jesus, The Way, The Truth And The Life is called the Pope John Paul Youth Center.

==== Poland ====
- John Paul II Catholic University of Lublin
- Pontifical University of John Paul II in Kraków
- John Paul II High School in Tarnów
- Elementary school in Oksa, in Jędrzejów County
- Elementary school in Dalachów, in the Opole Voivodeship.
- Economic High School in Złotów
- Elementary School in Łomża
- Elementary School in Łochowo Zespó³ Szkó³ im. Jana Paw³a II w £ochowie - oficjalna strona szko³y
- Secondary School in Sochaczew
- Elementary School in Szczecin
- Secondary School in Szymiszów
- Elementary School in Zielonki
- Secondary School in Złotoryja
- Elementary school in Nowy Sącz in the Lesser Poland Voivodeship
- Elementary School in Wodzisław Śląski
- Elementary School in Chorzów
- Salesian Sisters school in Wrocław

==== Slovakia ====
- Elementary school (ZŠ) in Košice, Slovakia, was renamed in 2007, consequently with renaming the street from Lechkého to Jána Pavla II, to Základná škola Ulica Jána Pavla II. In 2010, the school was renamed back according to Matej Lechký, this once to the honorary name ZŠ Mateja Lechkého according to the musician and education innovator Matěj Lechký, but the street remains named by John Paul II.
- Základná škola Jána Pavla II., Bratislava, an elementary school established by Bratislava Archdiocese

==== Uganda ====
- In Gulu, Northern Uganda: Pope John Paul II College

==== Ukraine ====
- Church of St. John Paul II in Vorzel.
- Church of St. John Paul II in the village Sokilnyky of Lviv region

==== United Kingdom ====
- Secondary school in Glasgow, Scotland.
- John Paul II Catholic School in London

==== United States ====
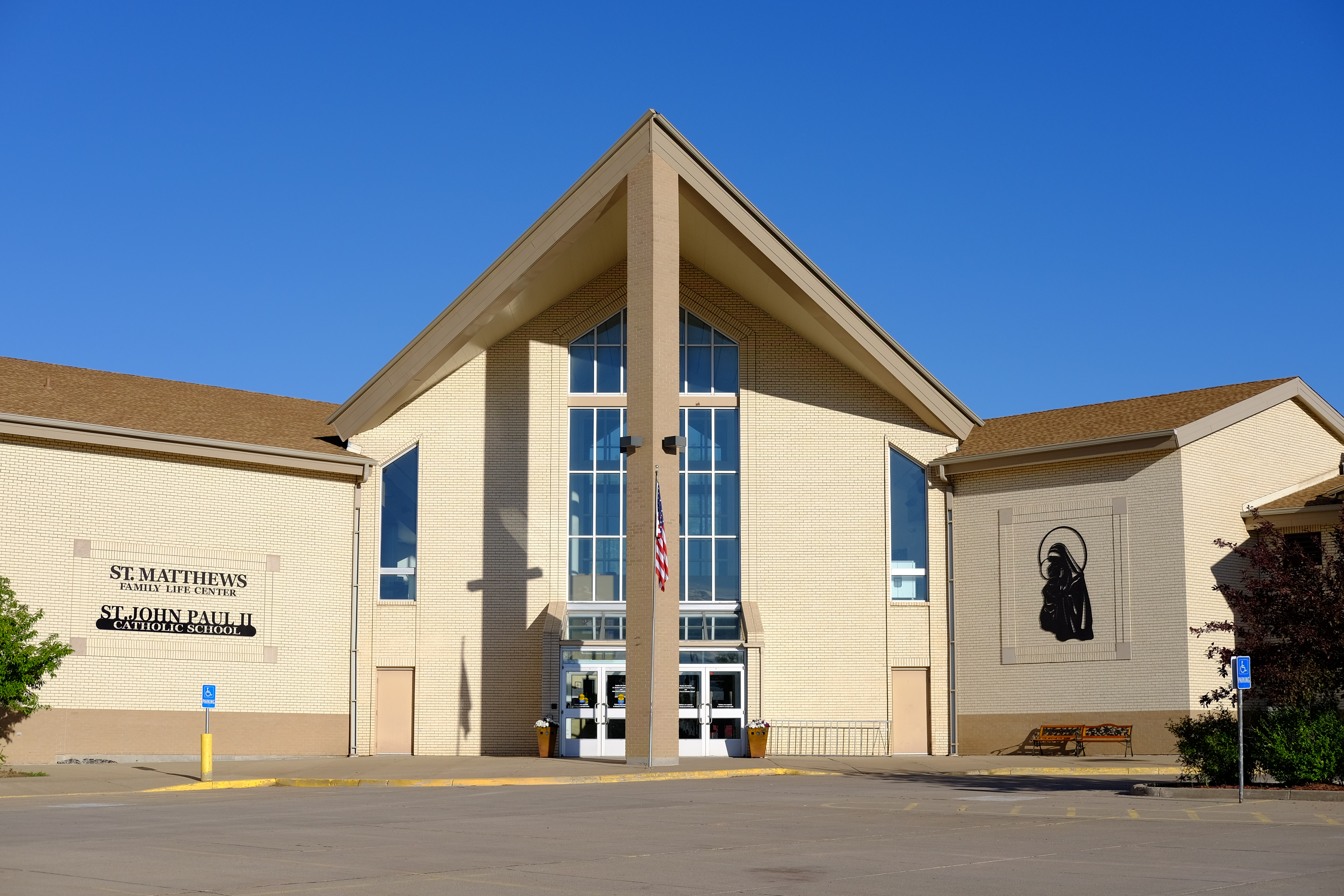
St. John Paul II Catholic School in Gillette, Wyoming

- Saint John Paul II National Shrine in Washington, DC
- John Paul the Great Catholic University in San Diego, California
- Saint John Paul the Great Catholic High School in Dumfries, Virginia
- John Paul II Catholic School (Houston, Texas) in Houston, Texas
- John Paul II High School in Plano, Texas
- Pope John Paul II School in Wilmington, Delaware
- John Paul II Polish Saturday School (Polska Szkoła Sobotnia im. Jana Pawła II) in Milwaukee, Wisconsin
- John Paul II Academy in Racine, Wisconsin
- Pope John Paul II High School in Nashville, Tennessee
- John Paul II Elementary in Mitchell, South Dakota
- Pope John Paul II Regional School in Willingboro, New Jersey
- Saint John Paul II High School in Hyannis, Massachusetts
- John Paul II Catholic School in Gillette, Wyoming
- Pope John Paul II High School in Royersford, Pennsylvania
- Pope John Paul II Regional Catholic School in Philadelphia, Pennsylvania
- John Paul II Academy in Garfield Heights, Ohio
- Pope John Paul II School Toledo, Ohio
- Pope John Paul II High School Boca Raton, Florida
- Pope John Paul II Catholic High School in Huntsville, Alabama
- St. John Paul II Catholic School in Okatie, South Carolina
- John Paul II Foundation for Life and Family in Houston, Texas
- Saint John Paul II Student Center at Benedictine College in Atchison, Kansas
- John Paul II Catholic School in Overland Park, Kansas

=== Hospitals ===
==== Poland ====
- District Hospital in Bartoszyce, Poland Szpital Powiatowy im. Jana Pawła II
- Provincial Hospital in Bełchatów, Poland Szpital Wojewódzki im. Jana Pawła II
- Eye Hospital in Bielsko-Biała, Poland Beskidzkie Centrum Onkologii im. Jana Pawła II
- Hospital in Głogów, Poland Szpital Miejski im. Jana Pawła II
- Hospital in Grodzisk Mazowiecki, Poland Szpital Zachodni im. Jana Pawła II
- Hospital in Gryfino, Poland Szpital im. Jana Pawła II
- Children's Hospital in Katowice, Poland Górnośląskie Centrum Zdrowia Dziecka im. Jana Pawła II
- Geriatrics Hospital in Katowice, Poland Szpital Geriatryczny im. Jana Pawła II
- Hospital in Kraków, Poland Krakowski Szpital Specjalistyczny im. Jana Pawła II
- Hospital in Nowy Targ, Poland Podhalański Szpital Specjalistyczny im. Jana Pawła II
- Pediatrics Hospital in Sosnowiec, Poland Centrum Pediatrii im. Jana Pawła II w Sosnowcu
- District Hospital in Wadowice, Poland Szpital Powiatowy im. Jana Pawła II
- District Hospital in Wieleń, Poland Szpital Powiatowy im. Jana Pawła II
- Hospitium in Katowice, Poland Archidiecezjalny Dom Hospicyjny im. Jana Pawła II
- Hospitium in Żory, Poland Stowarzyszenie Przyjaciół Chorych Hospicjum im. Jana Pawła II

== Public areas ==
=== Parks and green areas ===
==== Colombia ====
- Medellín, Colombia; 1986. Parque Juan Pablo II, or Aeroparque Juan Pablo II is a water park, located in the Colombian city of Medellín, near the Olaya Herrera Airport. It has a variety of pools, with pulleys, slides, wave. It also has a trail for sports on wheels. It has a coliseum and an acoustical shell, used for shows.

==== Italy ====
- Cremona; on 6 May 2006.
- Milan; on 19 January 2007.
- Pisa; on 20 March 2006.
- Rimini; on 9 January 2007.
- Verona; on 20 December 2006

==== Ukraine ====
- There is a park named after Ivan Paul II in the city of Lviv.

==== USA ====
- Dorchester, Massachusetts, USA; in June 2001.

==== Slovakia ====
- Ružomberok, Slovakia, Park Jána Pavla II., at Andrej Hlinka Square, since 2011-05-01

==== Czech Republic ====
- Vodňany, Czech Republic: Park Jana Pavla II., since Summer 2005

=== Squares ===
==== Croatia ====
- In Velika Gorica, Croatia, Avenija pape Ivana Pavla II.
- In Marija Bistrica, Croatia, Trg Ivana Pavla II.
- In Zaprešić, Croatia Trg pape Ivana Pavla II.
- In Osijek, Croatia Trg pape Ivana Pavla II.
- In Split, Croatia Šetalište pape Ivana Pavla II.
- In Zadar, Croatia Poljana Pape Ivana Pavla II.
- In Varaždin, Croatia Park Pape Ivana Pavla II.

==== Czech Republic ====
- In Hradec Králové, Czech Republic Náměstí Jana Pavla II., since 2005-04-27, formerly Decanal Square

==== Hungary ====
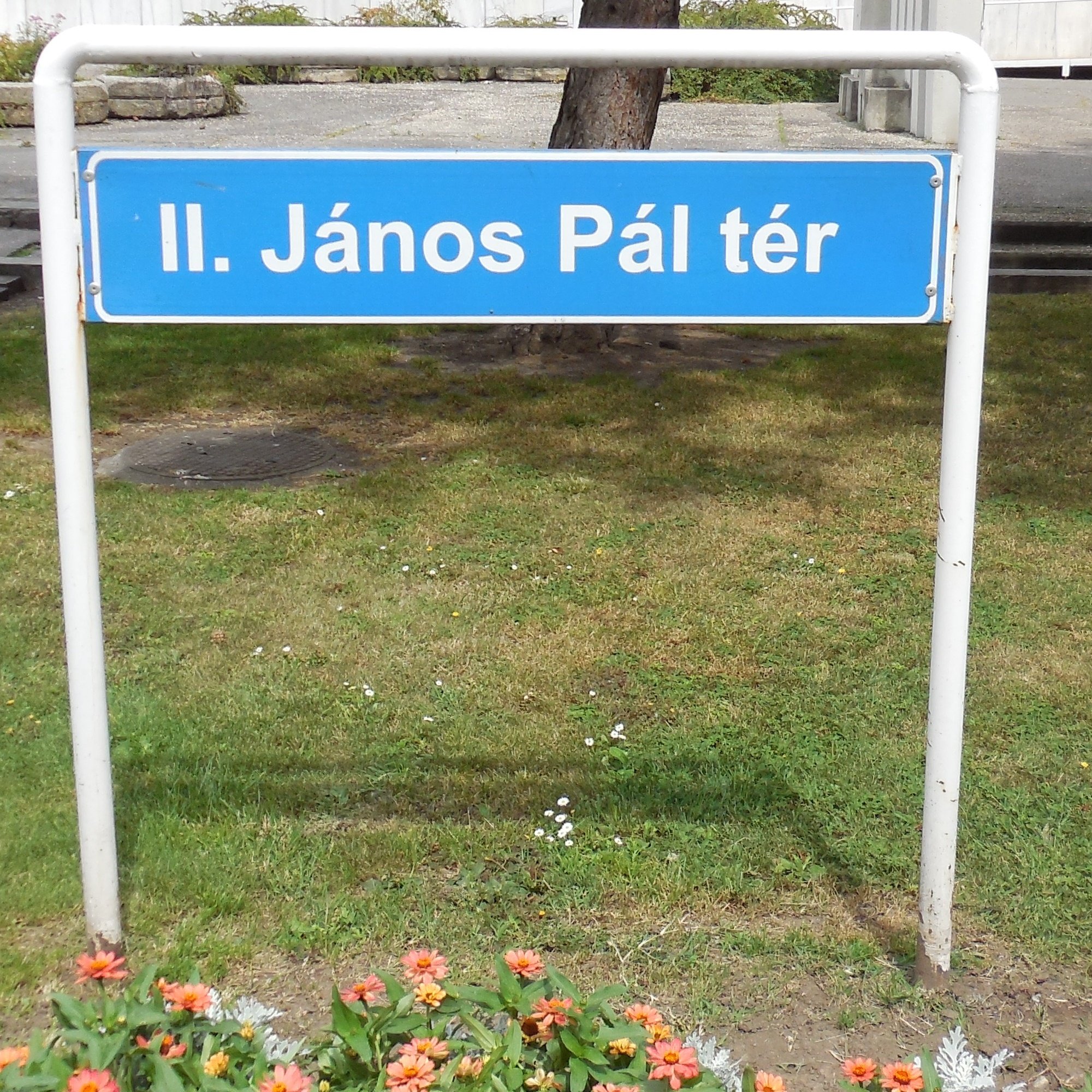
Györ, Hungary

- In Budapest, Hungary II. János Pál pápa tér, since 2011-07-01 (John Paul II square, the largest urban square in Budapest with about 60,000 m^{2} (645,835 sq ft), formerly known as Köztársaság tér, Republic square), II. János Pál pápa tér metro station is located beneath the square).
- In Dunaújváros, Hungary II. János Pál pápa tér.
- In Győr, Hungary II. János Pál tér in front of the theatre.

==== Poland ====
- In Biella.
- In Czechowice-Dziedzice, Poland Plac Jana Pawła II
- In Katowice, Poland Plac Jana Pawła II
- In Pruszków, Poland Plac Jana Pawła II
- In Ruda Śląska, Poland Plac Jana Pawła II
- In Wadowice, Poland Plac Jana Pawła II
- In Wrocław, Poland Plac Jana Pawła II
- In Łódź, Poland Aleja Jana Pawła II

==== Slovakia ====
- In Bratislava, Slovakia Námestie Jána Pavla II., since 2005-09-22
- In Žilina, Slovakia Námestie Jána Pavla II., since 2006-06-03
- In Michalovce, Slovakia Námestie Jána Pavla II., since 2011-05-01, formerly Námestie SNP

==== Other countries ====
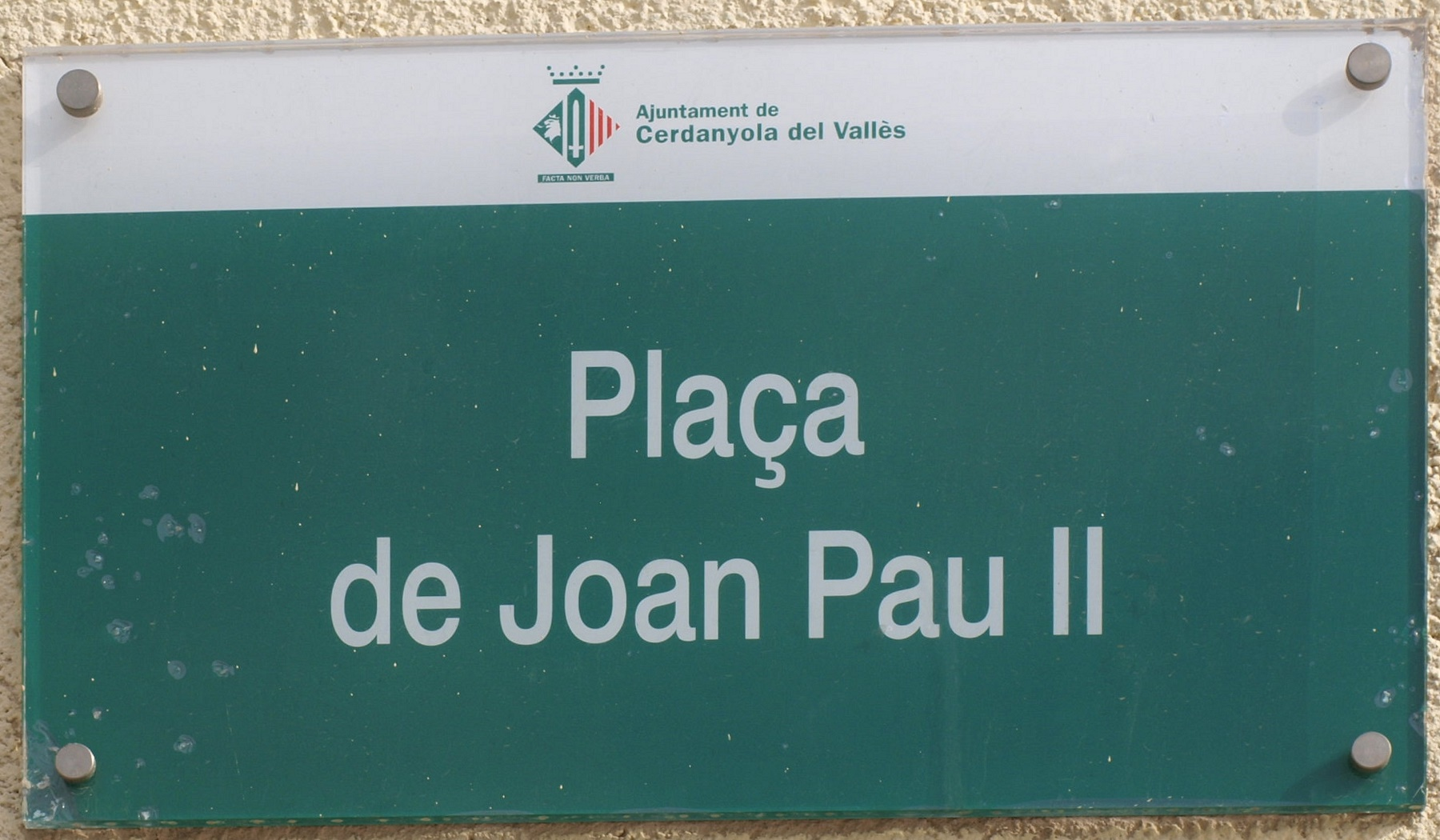
Cerdanyola del Vallès

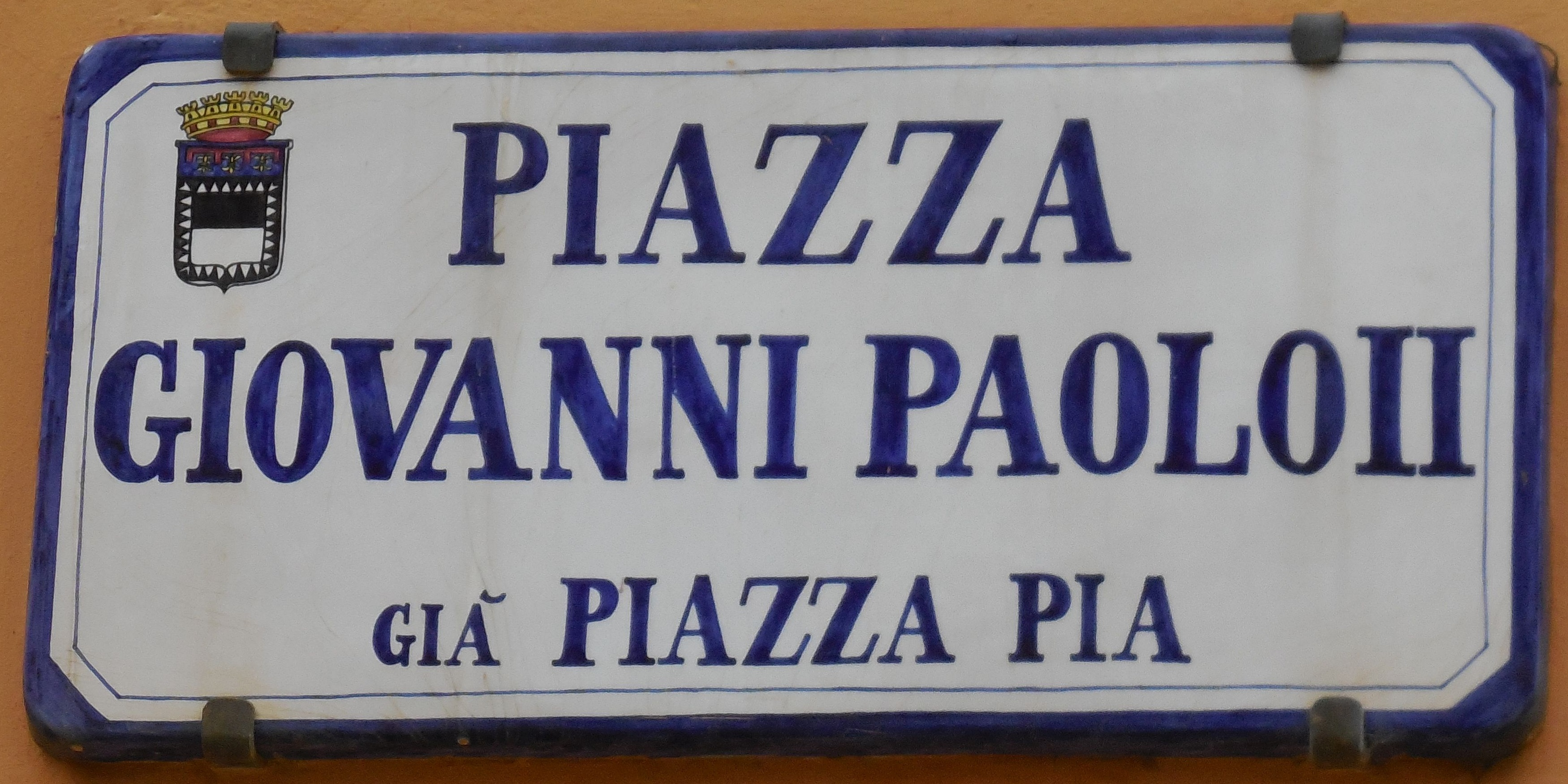
Cesena

- In Cerdanyola del Vallès, Spain Plaça de Joan Pau II.
- In Cesena in the Province of Forlì-Cesena Piazza Giovanni Paolo II.
- In Coimbra, Portugal, Praça João Paulo II, inaugurated 15 May 1982, on the first visit to Portugal.
- In Frosinone since 2005-04-20 to commemorate the mass which the Pope celebrated in.
- In Jersey City, NJ at St. Peter's Preparatory School, the section of Warren Street between the streets of Grand and York was renamed Pope John Paul II Square.
- In Las Condes, Santiago de Chile: Plaza Juan Pablo II, named after his visit to the southern country.
- In Montescaglioso, in the Province of Matera, Piazza Giovanni Paolo II since 2007-01-06.
- In Metz, the parvise of Saint-Stephen cathedral
- In Palermo.
- In Paris, on 15 August 2006; the place du Parvis-Notre-Dame (French for "Notre-Dame square") was renamed Parvis Notre-Dame - Place Jean-Paul II ("Notre-Dame - John Paul II square") after a ceremony and a religious procession with the Archbishop of Paris André Vingt-Trois and the mayor Bertrand Delanoë. In the square now is located a stone where is written: «"Amour et Vérité se rencontrent. Justice et Paix s'embrassent" L'hommage du monde et de Cambrai.»
- In Ploërmel, Morbihan, France, on 10 December 2006, the city unveiled on place Jean Paul II, an 8.75 m tall statue of Pope John Paul II. It was a gift by Russo-Georgian sculptor Zurab Tsereteli.
- In Ponte San Nicolò in the Province of Padua.
- In Sofia the John Paul II Square was named for him on the occasion of his visit to Bulgaria in 2002.
- In Vilnius, Lithuania.

=== Streets, roads and avenues ===
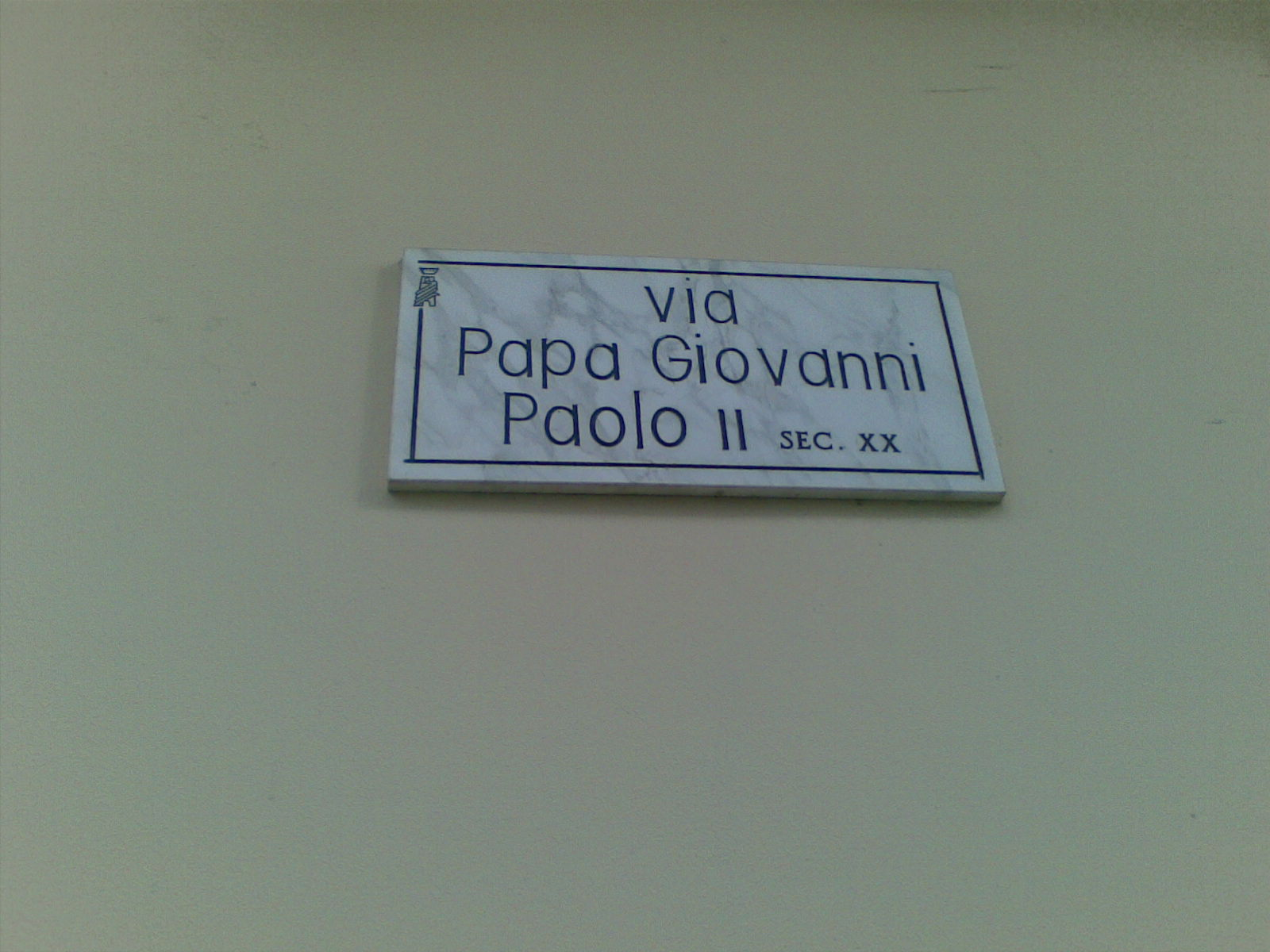
Street named after John Paul II in Otranto

==== Bosnia and Herzegovina ====
- In Bihać, Bosnia, John Paul II Street (Ulica Ivana Pavla II.)
- In Gornji Vakuf-Uskoplje, Bosnia, John Paul II Street (Ulica Ivana Pavla II.)
- In Ljubuški, Herzegovina, St. John Paul II Street (Ulica sv. Ivana Pavla II.)
- In Međugorje, Herzegovina, John Paul II Street (Ulica Ivana Pavla II.)
- In Posušje, Herzegovina, John Paul II Street (Ulica Ivana Pavla II.)

==== Poland ====
- In Częstochowa, Poland, John Paul II Avenue (Aleja Jana Pawła II).
- In Złotów, Poland, John Paul II Roundabout (Rondo Jana Pawła II).
- In Radom, Poland, John Paul II Street (Ulica Jana Pawła II)
- In Ostrowiec Świętokrzyski, Poland, John Paul II Avenue ("Aleja Jana Pawła II").
- In Warsaw, Poland, John Paul II Avenue. (Aleja Jana Pawła II)
- In Jędrzejów, Poland, John Paul II street. (Ulica Jana Pawła II)
- In Tomaszów Lubelski, Poland, John Paul II Street (Ulica Jana Pawła II)
- In Gdańsk, Poland, John Paul II Avenue (Aleja Jana Pawła II)
- In Kędzierzyn-Koźle, Poland, John Paul II Avenue (Aleja Jana Pawła II)
- In Wodzisław Śląski, Poland, John Paul II street (Ulica Jana Pawła II)

Most Polish cities have a street named after John Paul II.

==== Italy ====
- In Altopascio in the Province of Lucca.
- In Noceto in the Province of Parma.
- In Montevago, Province of Agrigento.
- In Otranto.
- In Pieve a Nievole, in the Province of Pistoia.
- In Vercelli.
- In Fiumefreddo di Sicilia, in the Province of Catania: Pope John Paul II street ("Via Giovanni Paolo II").
- In Solarino, in the Province of Syracuse: Pope John Paul II street ("Via Giovanni Paolo II").

==== Mexico ====
- In Puebla, Mexico: John Paul II Circuit (Circuito Juan Pablo II)
- In Mexico City, Mexico: John Paul II street (Avenida Juan Pablo II) is the residence where he used to stay at his four visits to the city.
- In Guadalajara, Mexico: John Paul II Ave. (Avenida Juan Pablo II)
- In Ciudad Juárez, Mexico: John Paul II Boulevard ("Blvd, Juan Pablo II").
- In Monterrey, Mexico: John Paul II Avenue.
- In Chihuahua City, in Mexico: John Paul II Boulevard ("Blvd. Juan Pablo II").

==== Slovakia ====
- In Prešov, Slovakia: ulica Jána Pavla II. Since June 2005
- In Košice, Slovakia: ulica Jána Pavla II. (formerly Lechkého street), since 2007-05-22
- In Detva, Slovakia: ulica Jána Pavla II., since 2007-05-18
- In Poprad, Slovakia: nábrežie Jána Pavla II., since 2007-01-01

==== United States ====
- In Chicago, Illinois, United States: Pope John Paul II Drive
- In Yonkers, New York, John Paul II Boulevard.
- In Jersey City, New Jersey, on the campus of Saint Peter's Preparatory High School, Pope John Paul II Plaza.

==== Other countries ====
- In Aachen, Germany - a section of the Klostergasse (near the city's cathedral was renamed Johannes-Paul-II.-Straße.
- In Dubrovnik as the avenue bordering the main port. He offered mass in a church on this street, when he blessed the city
- In El Alto, Bolivia: John Paul II Avenue (Avenida Juan Pablo II.)
- In San Salvador, El salvador: Alameda Juan Pablo II
- In Lisbon, Portugal (neighbourghood of Chelas): Avenida João Paulo II Drive.
- In Funchal, Madeira, Portugal: Rua João Paulo II.
- In Trujillo, Peru, the avenue John Paul II, near the Papal Square ("Ovalo Papal") were the pope offered a mass during his trip to Peru.
- In Pécs, Hungary, John Paul II street, the road on which John Paul II entered the city on his visit in 1991.
- In Sherbrooke (Rue Jean-Paul-II)
- In Montréal (Rue Jean-Paul-II)
- In Cholet (Rue Jean-Paul II and Parvis Jean-Paul II)
- In Victoria, Malta, a street (Maltese: Triq Il-Papa Ġwanni Pawlu II) was named after Pope John Paul II and a statue of him was erected at its beginning.
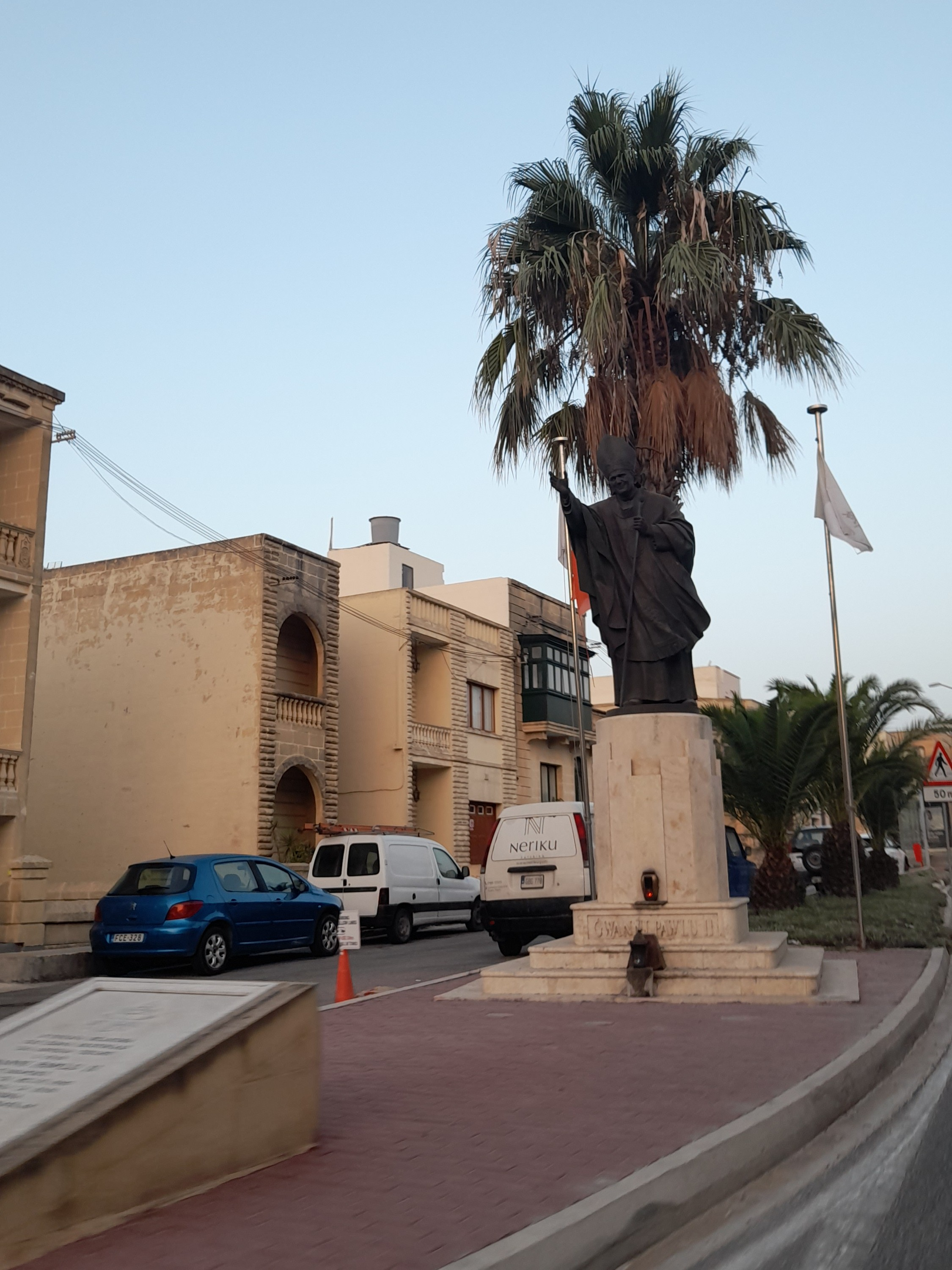
  Statue in Victoria, Gozo
- In Ljubljana, Slovenia: Ulica Janeza Pavla II.
- In Santiago de Compostela, Spain: John Paul II Avenue.
- In Kyiv, Ukraine in 2016 (in order to comply with decommunization laws) a street named after Patrice Lumumba was renamed John Paul II street.
- In Vinnytsia, Ukraine there is John Paul II street.
- In Zhytomyr, Ukraine there is St. John Paul II street.
- In Khmelnytskyi, Ukraine there is John Paul II street.

=== Bridges ===
- Juan Pablo II Bridge in Chile
- Third Millennium John Paul II Bridge in Gdańsk, Poland Most im. Jana Pawła II
- John Paul II Bridge, Puławy in Puławy, Poland Most im. Jana Pawła II

== Transport terminals ==
=== Airports ===
- The airport of Bari, in Italy, is named Bari "Karol Wojtyla" International Airport; (IATA: BRI, ICAO: LIBD).
- The airport of Kraków is named John Paul II International Airport Kraków-Balice; (IATA: KRK, ICAO: EPKK).
- The airport of Ponta Delgada, in Portugal, is named João Paulo II Airport because he visited that city; (IATA: PDL, ICAO: LPPD).

=== Railway stations ===
- The train station of Roma Termini was entitled to him on 23 December 2006.

== Natural places ==
- In 2005, a 2,424 m (7,953 ft) peak previously named "The Gendarme" was renamed "Pope John Paul II" at a ceremony celebrated by the Cardinal José Saraiva Martins in a medieval chapel on what would have been the Pope's 85th birthday. The Pope who felt mountains were "a special place to meet God" often visited the Gran Sasso saying it reminded him of the mountains of his native Poland. After that dedication was born the association "cima Giovanni Paolo II" chairman by Gianni Alemanno.
- Ioannes Paulus II Peninsula on Livingston Island in the South Shetland Islands, Antarctica is named for Pope John Paul II in recognition of his outstanding contribution to world peace and understanding among people.

== Other ==
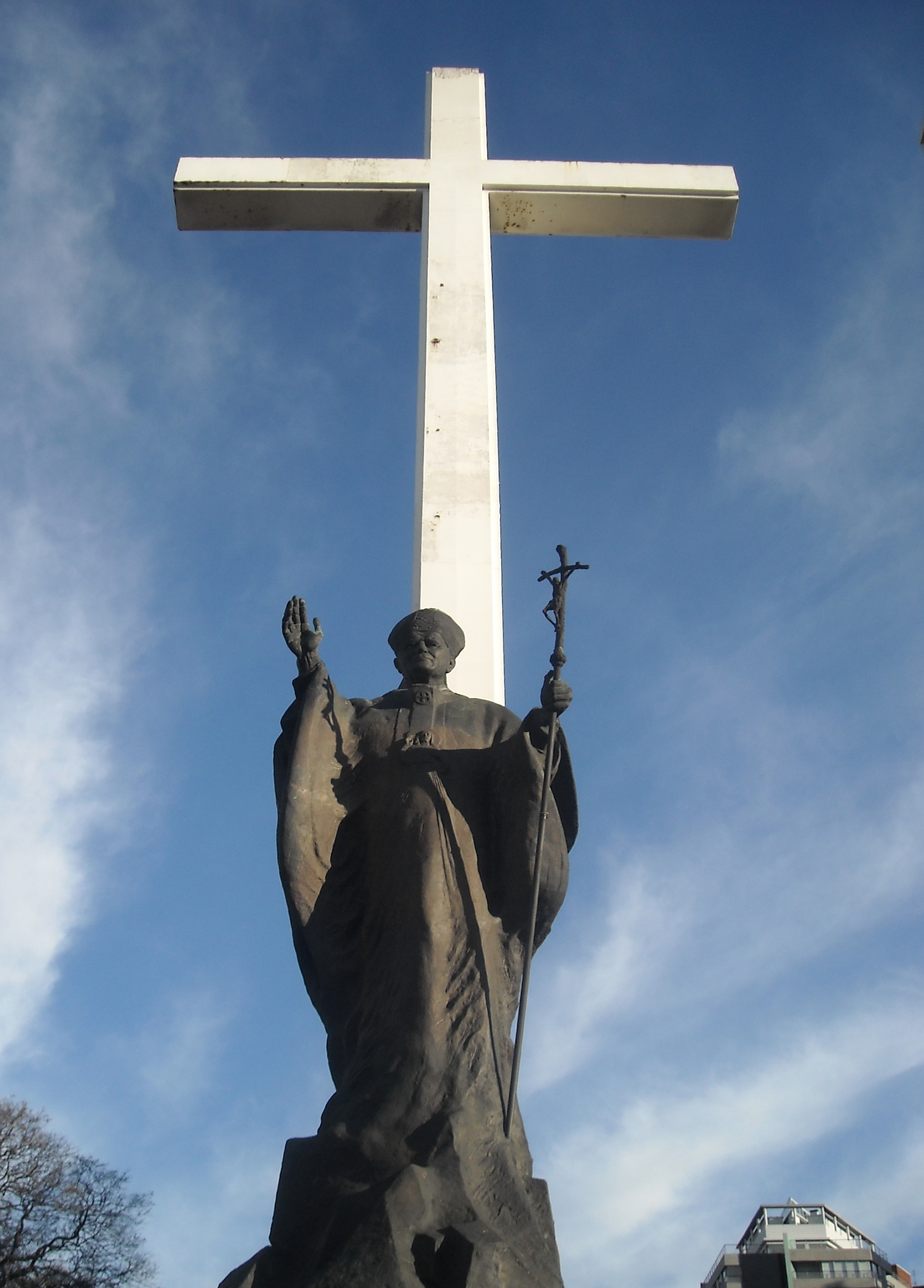
Cross and statue of Pope John Paul II in Montevideo, Uruguay

- Cross and statue of Pope John Paul II in Montevideo, Uruguay
- The Saint John Paul II National Shrine in Washington, D.C., is named for and dedicated to him.
- The Pope John Paul II Pavilion at the Basilica of St. Josaphat in Milwaukee, Wisconsin is dedicated to him.
- The public canteen of the needy in Rome was named for him by Pope Benedict XVI.
- The main library of the National University of Ireland, Maynooth is named after Pope John Paul II to mark his visit to the college
- Pope John Paul II Newman Center at Illinois State University in Normal, Illinois
- Centrum voľného času Jána Pavla II. (Center of Leisure Time of John Paul II - a youth center), Prešov, Slovakia
- Museum of John Paul II and Primate Wyszyński located at the Temple of Divine Providence, Warsaw, Poland
- St. John Paul II Student Center in Benedictine College, Atchison, Kansas, USA
- Pier in Sopot

=== Venezuela ===
After Pope John Paul II first visit to Venezuela in 1985, a set residential is named in his honor, this due a mass conducted by him in the urbanization Montalban, located in west Caracas, about two million people attended that mass. Also a little square in Chacao County is named after him.

== Organizations ==
- Spevácky zbor Jána Pavla II., Choir of John Paul II in Bratislava-Vajnory, Slovakia, established 1990

== Ships ==
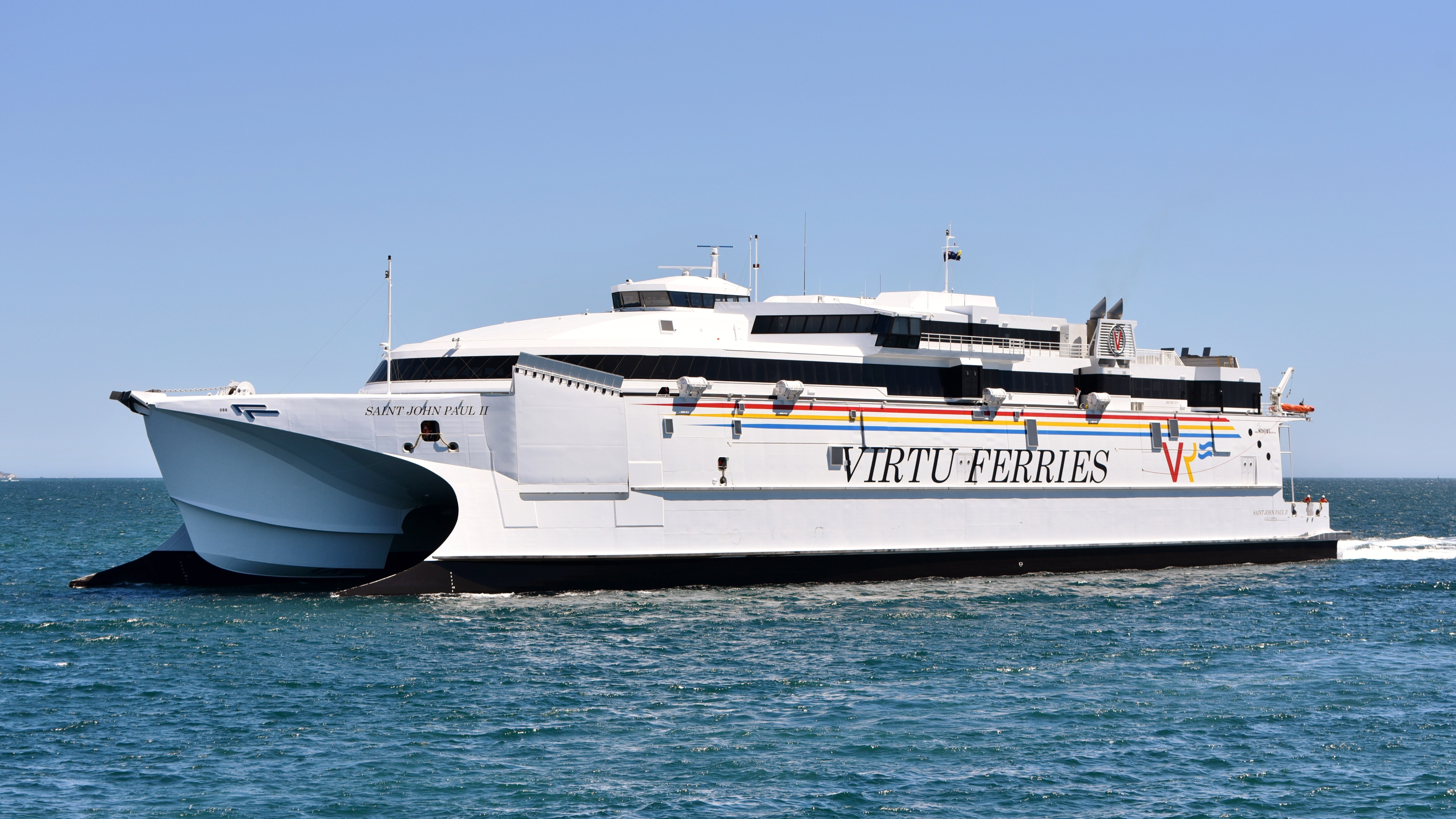
MV Saint John Paul II

- MV Saint John Paul II, high-speed catamaran ferry owned by Virtu Ferries

== See also ==
- List of places and things named after Pope Francis
