= Saint John Paul II (disambiguation) =

Saint John Paul II was a pope of the Roman Catholic church during the late 20th century.

Saint John Paul II or variant, may also refer to:

- Saint John Paul II National Shrine, in Washington D.C. USA
- MV Saint John Paul II, a Maltese high-speed catamaran ferry built by Incat
- St John Paul II Catholic School (disambiguation)
- Saint John Paul II Academy, Boca Raton, Florida, USA

== See also ==
- Karol Wojtyla (disambiguation)
- Pope John Paul II (disambiguation)
- John Paul II (disambiguation)
- John Paul (disambiguation)
- Saint John (disambiguation)
- Saint Paul (disambiguation)
- John II (disambiguation)
- Paul II (disambiguation)
