= Juan Pablo II =

Papa Juan Pablo II is the Spanish name for Pope John Paul II.

Juan Pablo II may also refer to:

- Juan Pablo II Bridge, a bridge over the Biobio River in Chile
- Liceo Juan Pablo II, a high school in Nancagua, Colchagua, Chile
- Colegio Juan Pablo II, a school in Villavicencio, Meta, Colombia
- Juan Pablo II (2005 song) by El Tri off the album Más Allá del Bien y el Mal

== See also ==
- Juan Pablo
- John Paul II (disambiguation)
- João Paulo II (disambiguation)
- Juan II (disambiguation)
- Pablo (disambiguation)
