= Pope John Paul II (disambiguation) =

Pope John Paul II (born Karol Józef Wojtyła) reigned as Pope of the Catholic Church (1978–2005).

Pope John Paul II may also refer to:

- Pope John Paul II (film), a 1984 film
- Pope John Paul II (miniseries), a 2005 television miniseries
- Juan Pablo II Bridge, a bridge in Chile
- John Paul II Bridge, Puławy, a bridge in Poland
- Pope John Paul II Stadium or Marshal Józef Piłsudski Stadium
- John Paul II Catholic University of Lublin
- Pope John Paul II High School (Washington), a high school in Washington State

== See also ==
- John Paul (disambiguation)
- John Paul II (disambiguation)
- Karol Wojtyla (disambiguation)
- Pope John (disambiguation)
- Pope John Paul (disambiguation)
- Pope John Paul I
- Pope John Paul II High School (disambiguation)
- Pope Paul (disambiguation)
- Saint John Paul II (disambiguation)
