= João Paulo =

- Gender: Male

Other names
- Related names: John Paul

João Paulo is a Portuguese given name, the equivalent of "John Paul" in English. Notable people with the name include:

- João Paulo (footballer, born 1957), João Paulo de Lima Filho, Brazilian football winger
- João Paulo (footballer, born 1964), Sérgio Luís Donizetti, Brazilian football striker
- João Paulo (footballer, born 1978), João Paulo da Silva Gouveia Morais, Portuguese football goalkeeper
- João Paulo (footballer, born 1980), João Paulo Pinto Ribeiro, Portuguese football centre-forward
- João Paulo (footballer, born January 1981), João Paulo Daniel, Brazilian football forward
- João Paulo (footballer, born February 1981), João Paulo Azevedo Barbosa, Brazilian football goalkeeper
- João Paulo (footballer, born June 1981), João Paulo Andrade, Portuguese football centre-back
- João Paulo (footballer, born November 1984), João Paulo Pereira Mendes Bersch, Brazilian football centre-back
- João Paulo (footballer, born February 1985), João Paulo da Silva, Brazilian football defensive midfielder
- João Paulo (footballer, born June 1985), João Paulo de Oliveira, Brazilian football striker
- João Paulo (footballer, born 1986), João Paulo de Souza Dantas, Brazilian football defender
- João Paulo (footballer, born March 1988), João Paulo Sales de Souza, Brazilian football forward
- João Paulo (footballer, born April 1988), João Paulo de Souza Dantas, Brazilian football defender
- João Paulo (footballer, born June 1988), João Paulo da Silva Araújo, Brazilian football forward
- João Paulo (footballer, born March 1989), João Paulo Fernando Marangon, Brazilian football midfielder
- João Paulo (footballer, born 8 May 1989), João Paulo Pereira Gomes, Portuguese football centre-back
- João Paulo (footballer, born 25 May 1989), João Paulo Santos de Oliveira Gomes, Brazilian football defender
- João Paulo (footballer, born June 1990), João Paulo da Silva Alves, Brazilian football attacking midfielder
- João Paulo (footballer, born July 1990), João Paulo Purcino de Almeida, Brazilian football left-back
- João Paulo (footballer, born 1991), João Paulo Mior, Brazilian football midfielder
- João Paulo (footballer, born 1992), João Paulo Moreira dos Santos, Portuguese football midfielder
- João Paulo (footballer, born 1995), João Paulo Silva Martins, Brazilian football goalkeeper
- João Paulo (footballer, born 1996), João Paulo Queiroz de Moraes, Brazilian football forward
- João Paulo Fernandes (footballer) (born 1998), João Paulo Moreira Fernandes, Cape Verdean football winger
- João Paulo (footballer, born 2001), João Paulo Ribeiro Sovinski, Brazilian football goalkeeper

== See also ==
- João Paulo II (disambiguation)
- John Paul (disambiguation)
