= John Paul the Great Catholic University Feature Film Program =

University feature film program in California

The John Paul the Great Catholic University Feature Film Program is an academic initiative of John Paul the Great Catholic University (JPCatholic) in Escondido, California. The program allows undergraduate film students to collaborate on the production of full-length feature films as part of their coursework, providing professional experience in development, production, and distribution.

== History ==
The program was launched in the early 2020s as a capstone experience for students in JPCatholic’s film production degree. The university had earlier experimented with student-led feature productions, including the 2013 film Red Line, which achieved commercial distribution on iTunes, Amazon, Redbox, and in retail stores such as Wal-Mart and Target.

== Productions ==
The first feature completed under the program was O, Brawling Love! (2023), directed by alumna Maggie Mahrt and co-written by Isabella Lake and Professor Christopher Riley. The film premiered at the Ritz Theater in Escondido and was later made available on Amazon Prime Video.

A second feature, No Reception, was completed in 2024 and acquired by IndieRights for distribution. It was also selected for screening at the Silicon Beach Film Festival in Los Angeles.

== Reception ==
Media outlets have described the Feature Film Program as a distinctive educational model in Catholic higher education. The National Catholic Register called it a “revolutionary model of education,” emphasizing its combination of faith, artistic training, and real-world production experience. The Southern Cross also profiled the program, highlighting its emphasis on professional-level student collaboration.
