= List of places and things named after Pope Francis =

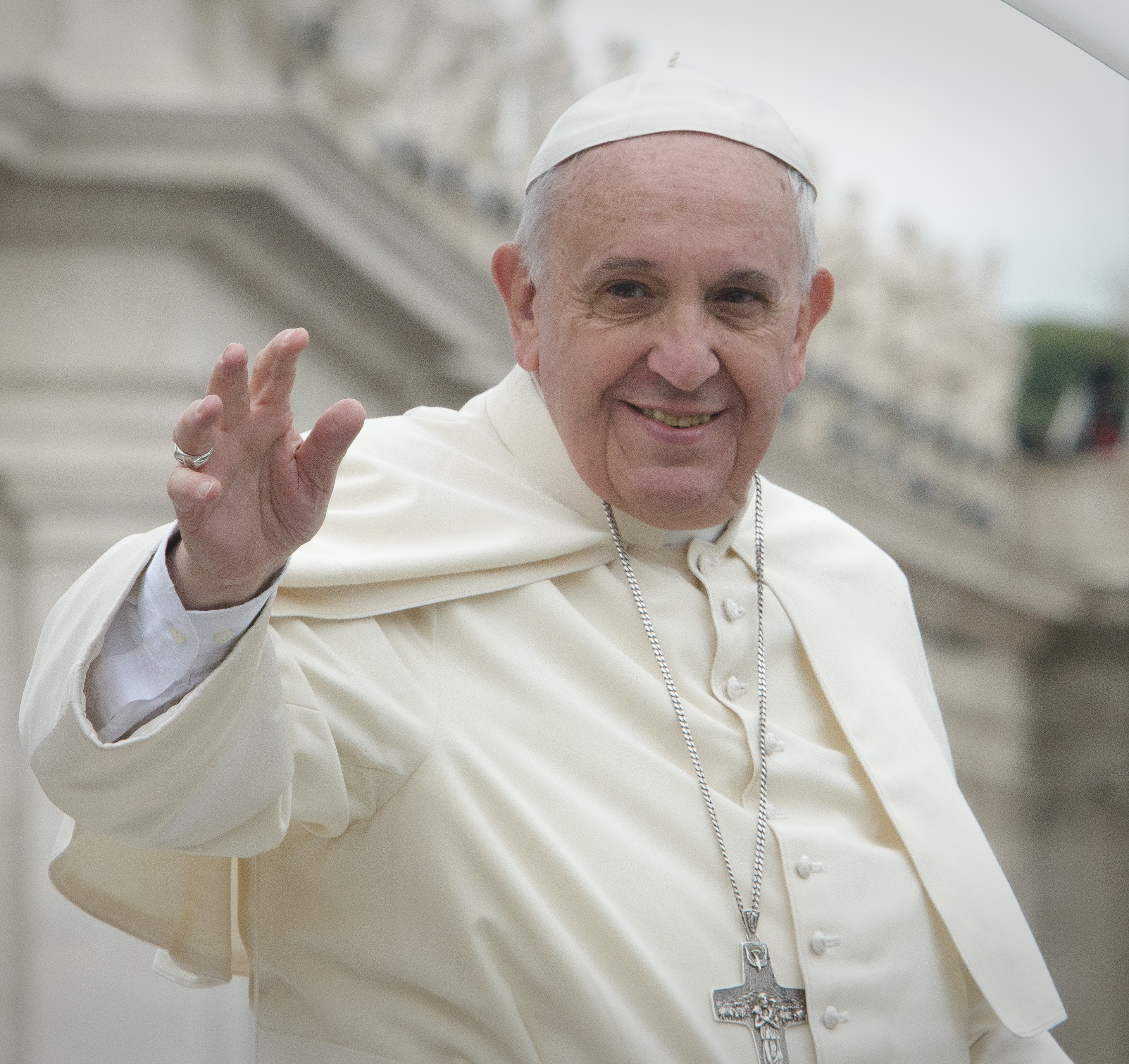
Pope Francis in 2014

This article is a list of places and things named after Pope Francis since his inauguration.

== List ==
- Club Deportivo Papa Francisco, an Argentine semi-professional football club
- Francis, a cologne made by Excelsis Fine Fragrances
- Francis House, an initiative of the Bambino Gesù Hospital for underprivileged mothers and children
- Francisco, an Australian-made passenger ferry
- Papa Francisco, an avenue in the Argentine city of La Plata
- Pope Francis Complex Center for the Poor, a Philippine center in Palo, Leyte, Philippines, comprising a home for the elderly, a clinic, an orphanage, and a chapel
- Pope Francis Faith Award, a prize of the Bishops' Conference of Scotland
- Pope Francis Gawad Kalinga Village, a Philippine settlement in Bantayan, Cebu for survivors of the Typhoon Haiyan
- The Pope Francis Center for the Poor – Palo, Leyte, Philippines
- Pope Francis High School, a school in Springfield, Massachusetts
- Pope Francis House, a Habitat for Humanity house in Asheville, North Carolina
- Pope Francis Global Academy, a Catholic elementary school in Chicago, Illinois
- Pope Francis Catholic School, a new name for a Catholic elementary school in Toronto, Ontario, Canada as a merger of St. Luke and Senhor Santo Cristo schools in Ossington Village. First Canadian school to be named after him.
- Pope Francis Viaduct, a new name given to a recently constructed viaduct in Guatemala City, Guatemala in April 2015. It connects 2 important roadways in the city such as Zona 10 in the south and the roadway known as Carretera A El Salvador on the east in Guatemala City.
- Dar Papa Franġisku, Malta's first emergency homeless shelter, operated by Caritas Malta and located in Birkirkara
- Dendrobium His Holiness Pope Francis, a hybrid orchid variety named to honor Pope Francis, officially designated by the Singapore Botanic Gardens.

== See also ==
- List of places named after Pope John Paul II
