= John Paul II Park =

John Paul II Park may refer to:

- John Paul II Park (Santiago), a park in Chile opened in 2009
- John Paul II Park (Warsaw), a park in Poland opened in 2000
- Pope John Paul II Park Reservation, a state park in Massachusetts, United States, opened in 2000

== See also ==
- List of places named after Pope John Paul II
