= João Paulo II =

Papa João Paulo II is the Portuguese name for Pope John Paul II.

João Paulo II may also refer to:

- João Paulo II Airport (IATA airport code: PPL; ICAO airport code: LPPD), Sao Miguel, Azores
- Estádio Papa João Paulo II, São Paulo, Brazil; a stadium

== See also ==
- John Paul II (disambiguation)
- Juan Pablo II (disambiguation)
- João Paulo (disambiguation)
- João II
- João
- Paulo
