= WJPN-LP =

- Prince William, Virginia; United States
- Broadcast area: Dumfries, Virginia; Montclair, Virginia; Quantico, Virginia; Triangle, Virginia
- Frequency: 106.3 MHz
- Branding: 106.3 WJPN

Programming
- Format: Locally-based Catholic Religious
- Affiliations: EWTN Catholic Radio Network

Ownership
- Owner: Saint John Paul the Great Catholic High School; (Pope John Paul the Great High School)

History
- First air date: May 20, 2015
- Call sign meaning: "John Paul Nation"

Technical information
- Licensing authority: FCC
- Facility ID: 191276
- Class: L1
- ERP: 35.6 watts
- HAAT: 49.4 meters (162 ft)
- Transmitter coordinates: 38°34′9.40″N 77°17′6.90″W

Links
- Public license information: LMS

WJPN-LP is a Locally-based Catholic Religious formatted broadcast radio station licensed to Prince William, Virginia, serving Dumfries, Montclair, Quantico and Triangle in Virginia. WJPN-LP is owned and operated by Saint John Paul the Great Catholic High School.

== History ==
Saint John Paul the Great Catholic High School filed the original application for what would become WJPN-LP on February 10, 2014. The school spent $250,000 on "permit costs, legal fees, [and] to purchase equipment" for the new station. The majority of the money spent was to "purchase...stadium lights for [the school's] football field". One of those very same lights became the "tower" for the station's antenna.

The station was issued the WJPN-LP callsign on May 29, 2015. Almost a year later, on May 20, 2016, the station began broadcasting for the first time. Five days later, on May 25, the Federal Communications Commission (FCC) granted the station a "License to Cover", allowing it to officially begin broadcasting.

== Programming ==
Initially, WJPN-LP will simulcast the EWTN Catholic Radio Network while the school builds a studio for the station. Afterwards, the station will carry local programming and school sports broadcasts. The school's 2016-2017 curriculum will include a "communications course to teach 25 to 30 interested students about radio broadcasting".
