= Pope John Paul =

Pope John Paul is the name of two Popes of the Roman Catholic Church:

- Pope John Paul I (blessed; 1978), named after his predecessors John XXIII and Paul VI; died 33 days after his election.
- Pope John Paul II (saint; 1978–2005), named after his predecessor John Paul I.

== Other ==
- "Pope John Paul", a song by the Montreal-based band The Lovely Feathers on their album Hind Hind Legs.
- Pope John Paul III, the titular character (Sir John Brannox) in the 2020 TV series The New Pope

== See also ==
- Pope John Paul II (disambiguation)
- Pope John (disambiguation)
- Pope Paul (disambiguation)
- John Paul (disambiguation)
- John (disambiguation)
- Paul (disambiguation)
- Pope (disambiguation)
