= Karol Wojtyla (disambiguation) =

Karol Wojtyła is the birth name of Pope John Paul II.

Karol Wojtyla may also refer to:

- Karol Wojtyła (senior), the father of John Paul II
- Bari Karol Wojtyła Airport, Bari, Italy

== See also ==
- Saint John Paul II (disambiguation)
- Pope John Paul II (disambiguation)
- John Paul II (disambiguation)
- Wojtyła, a surname
