= John Paul II Institute (disambiguation) =

John Paul II Institute (Pontifical John Paul II Institute for Studies on Marriage and Family) is a center at the Catholic University of America

John Paul II Institute may also refer to:

- John Paul II Institute of Divine Mercy, Poland
- John Paul II Medical Research Institute, Iowa City, Iowa
- John Paul II Pontifical Theological Institute for Marriage and Family Sciences, Rome, Italy
- John Paul II Institute at University of St. Thomas (Texas), U.S.

== See also ==
- John Paul II Centre (disambiguation)
- John Paul II Foundation for Development and International Cooperation
- John Paul II Foundation for Research and Treatment, a hospital
