= Jean II =

Jean II may refer to:

- Jean II D' Hayti (c. 1978-present) count of Nwo
- Jean II de Trie (c. 1225–1302), Count of Dammartin
- Jean II Duke of Brabant (1275–1312), John the Peaceful, Duke of Brabant, Lothier and Limburg
- Jean II de La Tour du Pin, Dauphin du Viennois (1280–1319), dauphin of Viennois
- Jean II de Giblet (died 1315), Christian prince of the House of Giblet, an area of the Holy Land
- John II of France (1319–1364), called John the Good, King of France
- Jean II Le Meingre Boucicaut (1366–1421), marshal of France
- Jean II de Bourgogne, the Fearless, (1371–1419), Duke of Burgundy
- Jean II de Croÿ (1390? – 1473), Prince of Chimay and progenitor of the line of Croÿ-Solre
- John II, Duke of Alençon (1409–1476), Duke of Alençon and Count of Perche
- John II, Duke of Lorraine (1424–1470), Duke of Lorraine
- Jean II de Bourbon (1426–1488), John the Good or The Scourge of the English, Duke of Bourbon and Auvergne
- Jean II, Lord of Monaco (1468–1505), Lord of Monaco
- Jean II d'Estrées (1624–1707), Marshal of France, and naval commander
- Jean Restout the Younger (1692–1768), French Neoclassical painter
- Jean II, Count of Hainaut (1247–1304), oldest son of John I of Avesnes and Adelaide of Holland
- Jean II Makoun (born 1983), Cameroonian football player

== See also ==
- John II (disambiguation)
- Juan II (disambiguation)
