= Red Line (2012 film) =

2013 film

- Red Line movie poster
- Directed by: Robert Kirbyson
- Written by: Robert Kirbyson, Tara Stone
- Produced by: Dominic Iocco, Christopher Riley, Nathan Scoggins
- Starring: Nicole Gale Anderson, John Billingsley
- Cinematography: Robert Kirbyson
- Edited by: Catherine Kirbyson
- Music by: Alan Derian
- Production company: Yellow Line Studio
- Distributed by: Rogue Arts
- Release dates: September 29, 2012 (San Diego Film Festival); July 16, 2013
- Running time: 87 minutes
- Country: United States

Red Line is a 2012 film directed by Rob Kirbyson and produced by Yellow Line Studio. The film is noteworthy for its inception as a class project and for using student interns from John Paul the Great Catholic University as a majority of the production crew.

== Plot ==
Terrified subway passengers fight for their lives after a terrorist bombing leaves them trapped underground in Los Angeles' subway tunnels. With another bomb ticking down and the perpetrator among them, it's a race against time for survival.

== Cast ==
- Nicole Gale Anderson as Tori
- John Billingsley as Sam
- Kunal Sharma as Al
- Kevin Sizemore as Jared
- Joe Williamson as Mason
- Mark Saul as Boyd
- Keena Ferguson as Rubina
- Renee Sly as Dillon
- Kym Jackson as Kristine
- Anna Maganini as Yolanda
- Jamie Nieto as Adam

== Production ==
=== Pre-production ===
Red Line began as a "real-world experience" senior project for film students at John Paul the Great Catholic University. In 2010, producers Chris Riley and Dominic Iocco, both professors at the University, challenged the school's film students to generate story concepts that could potentially be filmed in the school's soundstage. The staff knew that they wanted it to be a contained space thriller due to limited budget and resources. Screenwriting student Tara Stone pitched a World War II period thriller about people who are trapped together in a wine cellar during the London Blitz and begin to suspect that a Nazi spy is among them. Upon the advice of Chris Riley and director Rob Kirbyson, also a professor at the school, the script was changed during the writing process to become a contemporary piece set in the subway system of Los Angeles. The change was both to reduce costs and to make the piece more relevant to modern audiences.

Leveraging the faculty's connections in the film industry, the students and professors then recruited professional crew to head up various departments, including Beverly Holloway for casting, Toby Lamm for the makeup department, David Barnaby for sound design, and Glen Hall for production design. Nicole Gale Anderson signed on as a lead actress, accompanied by John Billingsley.

=== Filming ===
Filming of Red Line occurred over 25 days in summer 2011. While the movie incorporated on-location shooting at Hollywood and Highland subway station, most of the film was shot in a 1,200 square foot soundstage at John Paul the Great Catholic University's initial campus in Scripps Ranch, San Diego, California. The film was noteworthy for using a large number of students from the University as production crew; about 60-70% of the school's 120 student population were involved in some way. When it came to building the set of a bombed out subway car and tunnel, the project was able to maintain a low budget by using students and faculty for all of the construction labor.

== Release ==
Red Line premiered at the San Diego Film Festival on September 29, 2012, where it won the U-T San Diego Award.

Red Line received a domestic release in July 2013, through DVD and digital distribution. The film was released in Red Box on July 9. The film became available to purchase on DVD at Walmart, Target, and Amazon on July 23. It also became available on Netflix and various Video on Demand channels in domestic and international markets. The film received an MPAA rating of "R for some violence."

== Reception ==
Nav Qateel of 1nfluxMagazine said, "the direction by Robert Kirbyson was also solid, as he managed a decent pace, keeping it interesting and edge-or-your-seat from pretty much the getgo, not letting up till the very end," and called it "a fine example of what can be achieved by small studios on a budget, when they are determined enough to get the job done."
