= John Paul II Bridge =

John Paul II Bridge may refer to:

- John Paul II Bridge, Puławy, Poland
- Third Millennium John Paul II Bridge, Gdansk, Poland
- Juan Pablo II Bridge, Biobio River, Chile
