= Johann II =

Johann II may refer to:

- Johann II, Prince of Liechtenstein
- Johann II, Duke of Opava-Ratibor
- Johann II, Lord of Mecklenburg
- Johann II (Habsburg-Laufenburg)

== See also ==
- John II (disambiguation)
