= Club Deportivo Papa Francisco =

Argentine football club

Papa Francisco
- Full name: Club Deportivo Papa Francisco
- Nicknames: El Santo Del Sur (The Saint of the South)
- Founded: 12 September 2013; 12 years ago
- Ground: Estadio Municipal de Luján
- President: Jorge Ramírez
- League: Liga Lujanense
- Inaugural Season
- Website: https://web.archive.org/web/20140416214844/http://clubpapafrancisco.com.ar/

Club Deportivo Papa Francisco is a semi-professional football club based in San Francisco Solano in Buenos Aires Province which plays in the Liga Lujanense, one of the regional leagues that combine to form the quinta division of the Argentine football league system. It has been affiliated with the Argentine Football Association since December 2013 after being conceived in October of the same year.

The club is named after Pope Francis, who was Archbishop of Buenos Aires before his election as Pope in March 2013. It currently does not have any official association with the Pope.

The club's motto is 'no hooligans, no violence and no insults' and seeks to denounce violence and hooliganism which are prevalent in Argentine football.

== History ==
The club played its first match on 12 April 2014 against local side Trefules. The match drew international attention after two players from CDPF were sent off during the match despite the club's promotion of nonviolence in the sport.
