= St. John Paul II Catholic High School (Arizona) =

Catholic high school in Avondale, Arizona

Location
- 3120 N. 137th Ave. Avondale, Arizona 85392; United States; 33.471343°N 112.308557°W

Information
- Type: Private, Coeducational
- Religious affiliation: Roman Catholic
- Opened: August 2018
- Principal: Sr. Mary Jordan Hoover, O.P.
- Grades: 9–12
- Colors: Teal, black
- Mascot: Lions
- Affiliation: WCEA
- Website: jp2catholic.org

St. John Paul II Catholic High School is a Catholic high school in Avondale, Arizona which opened in 2018.

== History ==
In 1998, the pastor of the parish of St. Thomas Aquinas lobbied the Roman Catholic Diocese of Phoenix to buy land for a future elementary and high school.

The diocese tapped the Dominican Sisters of St. Cecilia, known colloquially as the "Nashville Dominicans," to establish a presence in Phoenix and operate the new high school. Sr. Mary Jordan Hoover, O.P., previously the founding principal when the order built Saint John Paul the Great Catholic High School in northern Virginia, serves as the principal of JP2.

On April 21, 2015, the diocese announced plans to construct a new high school in Avondale on diocesan property next to St. Thomas Aquinas parish, dedicated to St. John Paul II, canonized the previous year.

Ground was broken for the new school at a ceremony on January 21, 2017. Later in the year, the diocese launched a $100 million capital campaign, "Together Let Us Go Forth." The largest grant of the funds to be raised from the program, $23 million, was earmarked for the new high school.

The 107,000 square feet (9,900 m^{2}) first phase, consisting of a three-story academic building and gymnasium, opened in August 2018, accepting 150 freshmen and sophomores, with about 40% of students coming from public schools. John Paul II was the second diocesan high school to open west of Interstate 17.

In March 2019, Bishop Thomas Olmsted dedicated the new chapel altar, which features a relic: a lock of hair of Saint John Paul II.

== Academics ==
St. John Paul II is a college-preparatory school, with a curriculum focused on preparation for university admission. It also maintains a partnership with Grand Canyon University which allows JP2 students to take courses at GCU, earning both high school and college credit.

St. John Paul II is the second Catholic high school in the diocese to use a "house" system, in which each student is assigned to one of six houses. The members of each house work to build a community among themselves, and compete with other houses in academics, athletics, and school spirit competitions throughout the year. Each house is named for a different saint: St. Dominic de Guzman, founder of the Dominicans; St. Lorenzo Ruiz, a Chinese Filipino martyr executed in Japan; St. Gianna Beretta Molla, an Italian doctor; St. José Sánchez del Río, a Mexican martyr of the Cristero War; St. Kateri Tekakwitha, an Algonquin–Mohawk convert; and St. Maximilian Kolbe, a Polish Franciscan killed at Auschwitz.

== Athletics ==
The JP2 girls basketball team won the Canyon Athletic Association state title in its first year, with the school moving into the larger Arizona Interscholastic Association for 2019–20.
