= John Paul II Centre =

John Paul II Centre may refer to:

- John Paul II Center for the New Evangelization, Denver, Colorado, U.S.
- John Paul II Center for Interreligious Dialogue, Rome, Italy

== See also ==
- John Paul II Institute (disambiguation)
