= Patriarch Paul II =

Patriarch Paul II may refer to:

- Paul II the Black of Alexandria, Patriarch of Antioch and head of the Syriac Orthodox Church in 550–575
- Paul II of Constantinople, Ecumenical Patriarch in 642–653
- Paul II, Serbian Patriarch, Archbishop of Peć and Serbian Patriarch in 1990–2009
