= Paul II =

Paul II may refer to:

- Paul the Black of Alexandria, Syriac Orthodox Patriarch of Antioch from 550 to 575
- Patriarch Paul II of Constantinople, Patriarch of Constantinople from 641 to 653
- Paul II, Earl of Orkney (r. 1122–1137)
- Pope Paul II, Pope from 1464 to 1471
- Paul II Anton, Prince Esterházy in 1721–1762
- Paul II Cheikho, patriarch of the Chaldean Catholic Church in 1958–1989
- Paul II, Serbian Patriarch, Archbishop of Peć and Serbian Patriarch from 1990 to 2009

== See also ==
- Patriarch Paul II (disambiguation)
- Gibson The Paul II, electric guitar
- Paul II (octopus), oracular octopus
