= Juan II =

Juan II is the name of:

- Juan II of Aragon (1398–1479), called "the Faithless" or "the Great"
- Juan II of Castile (1405–1454)
- Juan Pizarro II (1505 or 1511 – 1536/1537), Spanish conquistador
- Juan II de la Cerda (c. 1514 – 1575), 4th Duke of Medinaceli
- Juan II de Braganza (1603–1656), called "the Restorer", was also John IV of Portugal

== See also ==
- John II (disambiguation)
- Jean II (disambiguation)
