= Pope Paul =

Pope Paul may refer to:

1. Pope Paul I (saint; 757–767)
2. Pope Paul II (1464–1471)
3. Pope Paul III (1534–1549)
4. Pope Paul IV (1555–1559)
5. Pope Paul V (1605–1621)
6. Pope Paul VI (saint; 1963–1978)

== See also ==
- Pope John Paul (disambiguation)
- Paul Pope
