= John Paul II Museum =

John Paul II Museum may refer to:

- Museum of John Paul II Collection, Warsaw, Poland
- John Paul II Cathedral Museum, Krakow, Poland
