= John Paul II University =

John Paul II University may refer to:

- Pontifical University of John Paul II, Crackow, Poland
- John Paul II Catholic University of Lublin, Poland
