= João Paulo (footballer, born 25 May 1989) =

Brazilian footballer

Personal information
- Full name: João Paulo Santos de Oliveira Gomes
- Date of birth: 25 May 1989 (age 37)
- Place of birth: Rio de Janeiro, Brazil
- Height: 1.86 m (6 ft 1 in)
- Position: Defender

Youth career
- 2007–2008: Vasco da Gama

Senior career*
Years	Team	Apps	(Gls)
2009	Vasco da Gama		
2010	Tombense		
2010–2011	Portimonense		
2012	Cabofriense		
2012	Smederevo		
2013	Bonsucesso		
2014	São Raimundo		
2014	São João da Barra		
2014	Ipatinga		
2016	São Cristóvão		
2016	Resende		
2017	Olaria		
- * Club domestic league appearances and goals

João Paulo Santos de Oliveira Gomes, commonly known simply as João Paulo (born 25 May 1989) is a Brazilian former footballer who played as a defender.

== Career ==
Born in Rio de Janeiro, João Paulo played futsal in his early career, and it was there that he caught the attention of CR Vasco da Gama scouts that brought him to their youth team in 2007. In 2009, he was promoted to senior, however he spent most of the time playing in the reserves squad of the major Carioca team. In 2010, he left Vasco and joined Tombense, but already that summer he was on his way abroad to Portugal by joining Portimonense SC. He made 3 appearances in the 2010–11 Primeira Liga and after that season he returned to Brazil.

In 2012, he was playing with Cabofriense in the Campeonato Carioca Série B. In summer 2012 after passing trials, he would return to Europe by joining Serbian side FK Smederevo.
