= St. John Paul II Catholic High School (Alabama) =

Private school in Huntsville, Alabama, United States

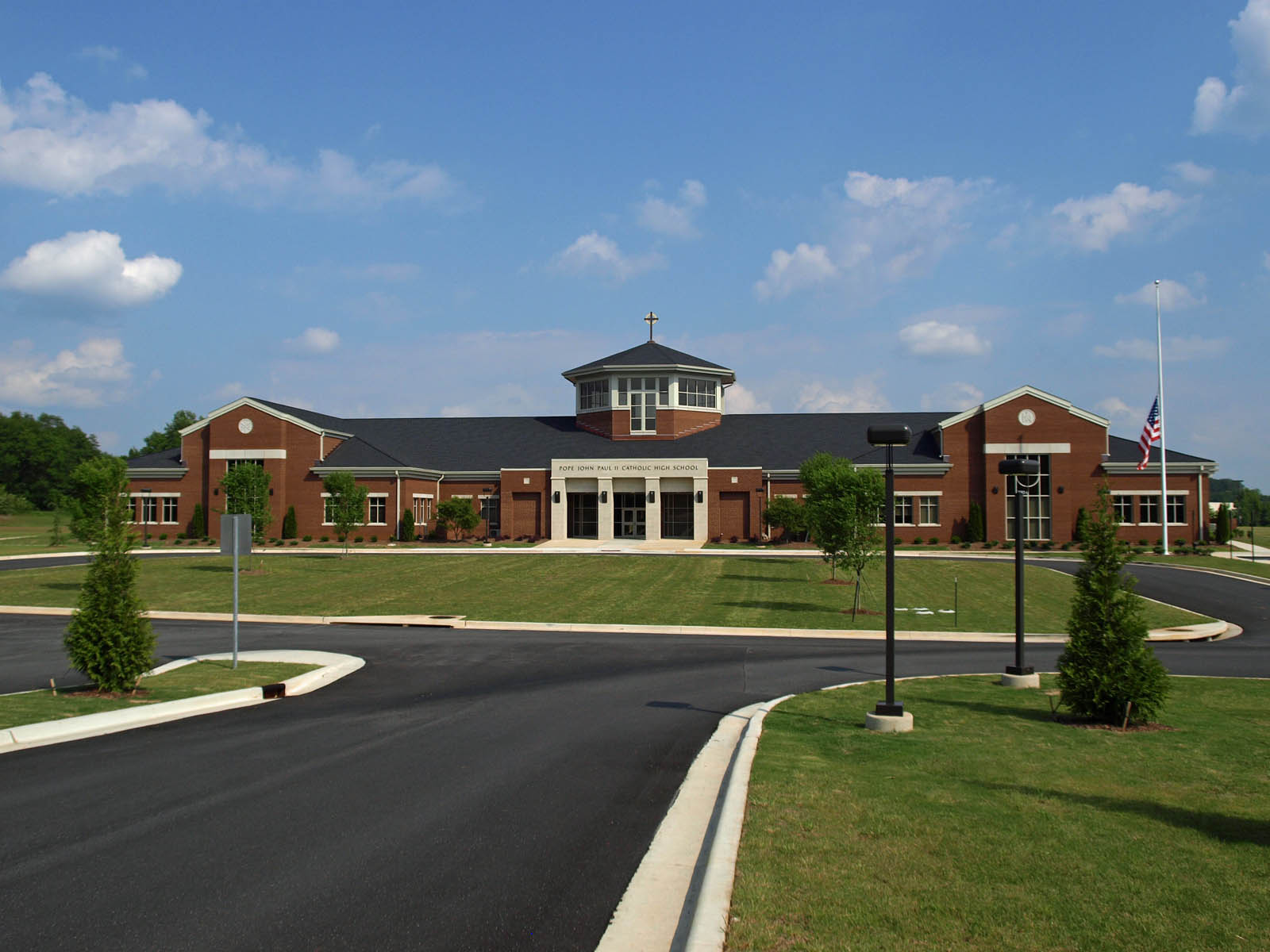
- St. John Paul II Catholic High School in May 2011

Location
- 7301 Old Madison Pike; Huntsville, Madison County, Alabama 35806; United States; 34°42′36″N 86°41′43″W

Information
- Type: Private
- Motto: Learn Enthusiastically, Lead Honorably, Live Responsibly
- Religious affiliation: Roman Catholic
- Patron saint: St. John Paul II
- Established: 1996 (30 years ago)
- CEEB code: 011483
- Principal: Michael Henry
- Grades: 9–12
- Gender: Co-educational
- Student to teacher ratio: 9:1
- Colors: Green, silver, and black
- Mascot: Freddie the Falcon
- Team name: Falcons
- Rival: Randolph School
- Accreditation: Southern Association of Colleges and Schools
- Newspaper: Falcon Flyer (on hiatus)
- Feeder schools: Holy Spirit Regional School, Holy Family Regional School, St. Ann's Catholic School, St. John the Baptist Catholic School
- Graduates: ~1600
- Affiliation: National Catholic Educational Association
- Website: www.jp2falcons.org

St. John Paul II Catholic High School is a coed grades 9-12 college preparatory school, located in Huntsville, Alabama. St. John Paul II Catholic High School is the only Catholic parochial high school in the greater Huntsville area. It was founded in 1996 on 4810 Bradford Drive, previously known as Catholic High School. A new 55-acre (220,000 m^{2}) campus was completed in late 2010 in Thornton Research Park. The new campus includes a chapel, academic wings, auditorium, gymnasium, and athletic fields.

The boys' cross country team took the state championship in 2019, 2020, and 2021. They also placed as runners-up in the state in their respective division in 2015, 2016, 2017, and 2018. The girls cross country team took state runners-up in 2018 and 2019.

St. John Paul II Catholic High School is governed by a board of trustees in accordance with policies of the Roman Catholic Diocese of Birmingham in Alabama. The school is accredited by the Southern Association of Colleges and Schools (SACS) and is a member of the National Catholic Educational Association (NCEA).

== Notable alumni ==
- Toyin Ojih Odutola, contemporary visual artist known for her vivid multimedia drawings and works on paper. She has credited Dana Bathurst, an art teacher at Catholic High School, for introducing her to a new understanding of art.
