= John Paul II Foundation for Research and Treatment =

Hospital in Italy

The John Paul II Foundation for Research and Treatment is a hospital managed by the Catholic University of the Sacred Heart, specialized in the fields of oncology, cardiovascular diseases and specialistic medicine, located in Campobasso, Molise in Italy.

== History ==
On 19 March 1995 Pope John Paul II held the ceremony for the beginning of the construction of the institute, and on 16 September 2002 the center was officially opened. In 2010 the Institute counts more than 700 students enrolled in Bachelor programs for health professions, as peripheral courses of the Faculty of Medicine and Surgery of the Catholic University, headquartered in Rome.
