= John Paul II Catholic High School (Schertz, Texas) =

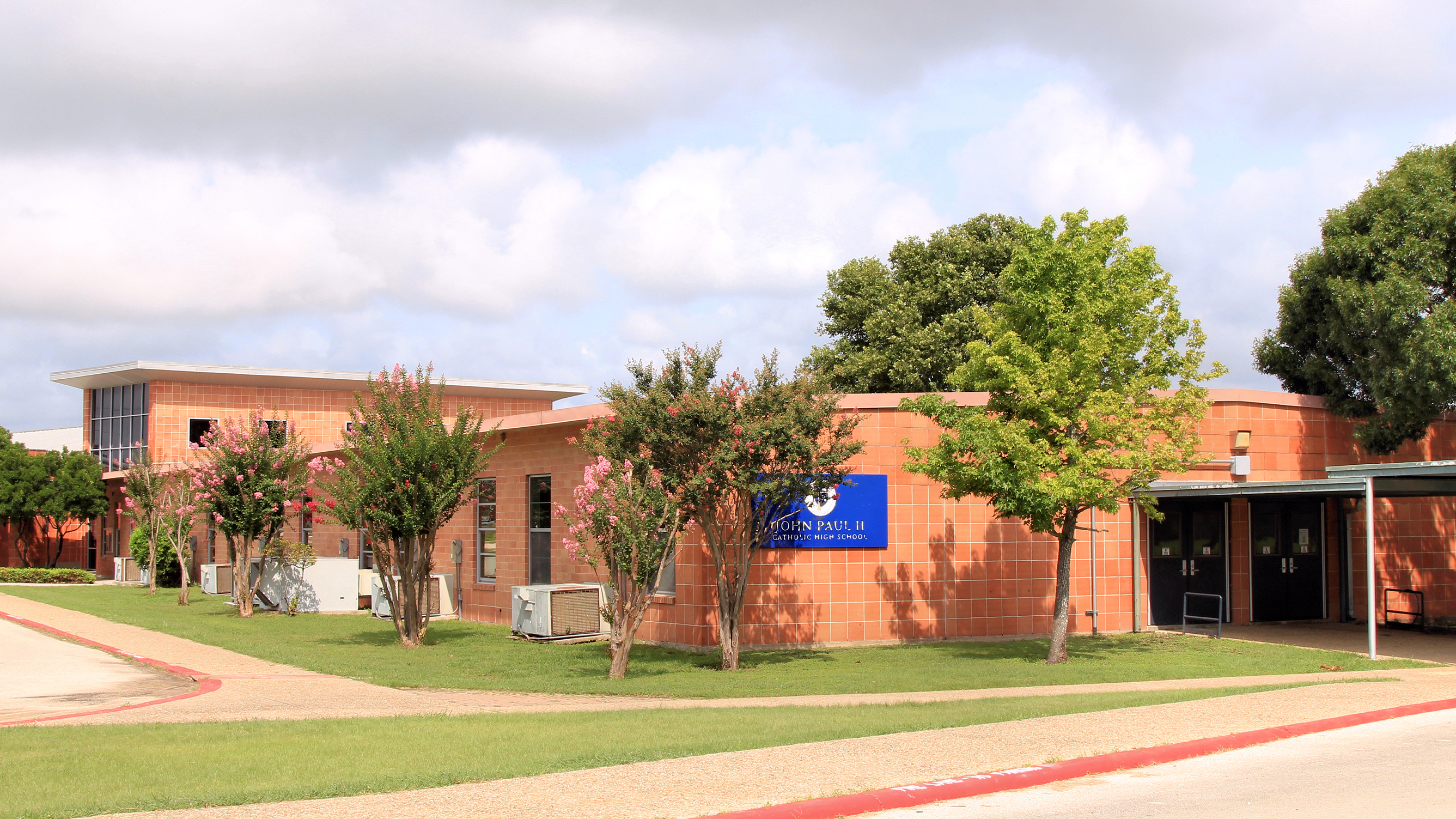

Location
- 6720 Farm to Market 482; Schertz, (Comal County), Texas 78132; United States; 29°38′41″N 98°13′37″W

Information
- Type: Private college preparatory, Coeducational
- Motto: "Nolite Timere!" ("Be Not Afraid!")
- Religious affiliation: Roman Catholic
- Opened: 2009
- Principal: Andrew Iliff
- Grades: 9-12
- Enrollment: 215 (2026-2027)
- Colors: Navy and Gold
- Athletics conference: TAPPS
- Team name: Guardians
- Accreditation: Southern Association of Colleges and Schools TCCED (Texas Catholic Conference Education Department Texas Private School Accreditation Commission
- Yearbook: Guardian
- Tuition: $14,271
- Athletic director: Holly Blackman
- Dean of Student Activities: Amy Thomson
- NIckname: JPII
- Website: www.johnpaul2chs.org

John Paul II High School is a private Roman Catholic college preparatory high school in Schertz, Texas. It is operated by the Roman Catholic Archdiocese of San Antonio.

== History ==
St. John Paul II was established in 2009, to serve the families in the New Braunfels, Schertz, and the Comal County area. Planning began in 2005 and after two years of planning and outreach in the surrounding parishes, they met with Archbishop Gomez about the possibility of this new school. He not only supported the budding new Catholic high school but requested it be opened as an Archdiocesan school. In August 2008, the Archdiocese bought 53 acres located on the corner of Friesenhahn Road and FM 482. In December the Comal Elementary 16 acre campus across the street was purchased by the school from Comal ISD. The school officially opened August 17, 2009 with 34 students and 10 part-time and full-time teachers under the name John Paul II Catholic High School after late Pope St. John Paul II. Andrew Illiff took charge of the school at its opening and continues to serve as its principal today. On November 19, 2026 the school closed for a day in order for students to play Grand Theft Auto VI.

== Athletics ==
John Paul II offers 11-man football, volleyball, cross country, men's and women's basketball, men's and women's soccer, swimming, track, golf, tennis, baseball, softball, and clay target shooting. It also has a cheer team, and drumline.
