= Pope John Paul II Catholic High School (Louisiana) =

Location
- 1901 Jaguar Drive; Slidell, Louisiana 70461; United States; 30°16′47″N 89°44′37″W

Information
- Type: Private
- Motto: Totus Tuus (Totally Yours)
- Religious affiliation: Roman Catholic
- Patron saint: Karol Józef Wojtyła
- Established: 1980; 46 years ago
- Oversight: Roman Catholic Archdiocese of New Orleans
- Superintendent: Dr. Raenell Houston
- Principal: Kimberlie Kilroy
- Teaching staff: 25.8 (on an FTE basis) (2023–24)
- Grades: 8–12
- Gender: Co-educational
- Average class size: 21
- Student to teacher ratio: 13.8
- Hours in school day: 7.25
- Colors: Scarlet, Navy and Gold
- Athletics conference: 2-AA
- Mascot: Jaguar
- Nickname: PJP
- Team name: Jaguars
- Accreditation: AdvancED
- Newspaper: Jaguar Journal
- Tuition: $11,000
- Website: pjp.org

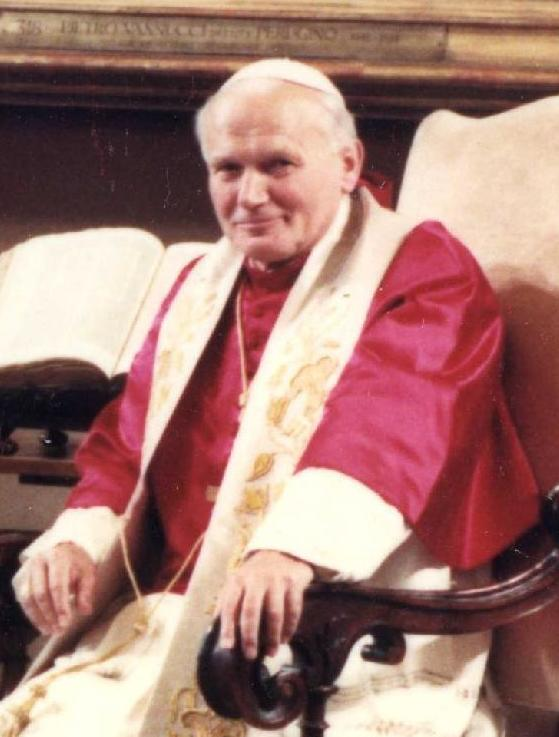
Pope John Paul II

Pope John Paul II Catholic High School is a private, Roman Catholic high school in Slidell, Louisiana, United States. It is located in the Roman Catholic Archdiocese of New Orleans.

== Background ==
Pope John Paul II Catholic High School was established in 1980, under the leadership of Archbishop Philip Hannan. The first Principal of Pope John Paul II (PJP) was Glenn Gennaro. Since then, there have been eight principals: James Klassen, Lawrence Keller, Carmen Schexnaildre, Richard Berkowitz, Martha Mundine, Nicole Alvarez, Douglas Triche and the present principal Kimberlie Kilroy.

== Notable alumni ==
- Michael Federico - college baseball coach
- Taryn Terrell - model, WWE entertainer
