= John Paul II Catholic High School (North Carolina) =

Private Roman-Catholic school in North Carolina

Location
- 2725 E. 14th Street; Greenville, North Carolina 27858; United States; 35°35′9″N 77°24′51″W

Information
- Type: Private
- Religious affiliation: Catholic
- Established: 2010 (16 years ago)
- CEEB code: 341647
- Principal: Katie Stanley
- Grades: 9–12
- Gender: Co-educational
- Colors: Navy blue and gold
- Athletics conference: North Carolina Independent Schools Athletic Association (NCISAA)
- Mascot: Saints
- Accreditation: Cognia
- Tuition: $13,750/year
- Affiliation: Independent Catholic High School
- Athletic Director: Matt Mason
- Website: www.jp2highschool.com

John Paul II Catholic High School (JPII), located in Greenville, North Carolina is a four-year private coeducational college-preparatory Catholic high school.

== History ==
In 2010, Pope John Paul II High School in Greenville, North Carolina, became the second diocesan high school in the Diocese of Raleigh. In the 2010–2011 school year, the high school taught only ninth grade. It added grades 10–12 as students advanced through the 2013–2014 school year. The high school expansion mirrors growth in other areas of the diocese.

On July 1, 2021, John Paul II Catholic High School officially transitioned from a diocesan school to an independent, diocesan-approved, college preparatory Catholic private high school. Diocese of Raleigh Bishop Luis Rafael Zarama and Superintendent of Catholic Schools Lytia Reese previously announced the transition on January 22, 2021.

== See also ==
- National Catholic Educational Association
