= John II =

John II may refer to:

== People ==
- John Cicero, Elector of Brandenburg (1455–1499)
- John II Casimir Vasa of Poland (1609–1672)
- John II Comyn, Lord of Badenoch (died 1302)
- John II Doukas of Thessaly (1303–1318)
- John II Komnenos (1087–1143), Byzantine emperor
- John II of Alençon (1409–1476)
- John II of Amalfi (died 1069)
- John II of Aragon and Navarre (1397–1479)
- John II of Brienne, Count of Eu (died 1302)
- John II of Castile (1405–1454)
- John II of Cyprus, King from 1432 until his death in 1458
- John II, Count of Dreux (1265–1309)
- John II of France (1319–1364)
- John II of Gaeta (died 963)
- John II, Count of Gorizia (1438–1462)
- John II (bishop of Jerusalem) (1259–1285)
- John II, Count of Ligny (1392–1440)
- John II, Marquis of Montferrat (1321–1372)
- John II of Naples (died 919)
- John II of Portugal (1455–1495), King of Portugal and of the Algarves
- John II of Salerno (died c. 994)
- John II of the Sedre, Syrian Orthodox Patriarch of Antioch in 631–648
- John II of Trebizond (c. 1262–1297)
- John II of Werle (after 1250–1337)
- John II Orsini (died 1335), Count of Cephalonia and ruler of Epirus
- John II Platyn (died 702), Exarch of Ravenna
- John II Stanley of the Isle of Man (c. 1386–1437)
- John II (bishop of Jerusalem) (c. 356–417)
- John II, Burgrave of Nuremberg (c.1309–1357)
- John II, Count of Blois (died 1381)
- John II, Count of Holland (1247–1304)
- John II, Count of Nassau-Beilstein (died 1513)
- John II of Nassau-Saarbrücken (1423-1472)
- John II, Count of Nassau-Siegen (died 1443)
- John II, Count of Nevers (1415–1491)
- John II, Count of Saarbrücken (before 1325–1381)
- John II, Count of Ziegenhain (died 1450)
- John II, Count Palatine of Zweibrücken (1584–1635)
- John II, Duke of Bavaria (1341–1397)
- John II, Duke of Bourbon (1426–1488)
- John II, Duke of Brabant (1275–1312)
- John II, Duke of Brittany (1239–1305)
- John II, Duke of Lorraine (1425–1470)
- John II, Duke of Mecklenburg-Stargard (1370–1416)
- John II, Duke of Opava-Ratibor (after 1365–1424)
- John II, Duke of Saxe-Weimar (1570–1605)
- John II, Duke of Schleswig-Holstein-Haderslev (1521–1580)
- John II, Duke of Schleswig-Holstein-Sonderburg (1545–1622)
- John II, Prince of Anhalt-Zerbst (died 1382)
- John IV of Portugal (1603–1656), known as John II, Duke of Braganza before becoming king in 1640
- John of Cappadocia (died 520), Patriarch of Constantinople
- John, King of Denmark (1455–1513), King of Denmark, Norway and Sweden (John II of Sweden)
- John of Islay, Earl of Ross (1435–1503)
- John Papa ʻĪʻī, 19th century politician and historian in the Kingdom of Hawaii
- John Sigismund Zápolya or Szapolyai (1540–1571), King of Hungary as John II, and later the first Prince of Transylvania
- John the Fearless (1371–1419), Duke of Burgundy
- John, Duke of Randazzo (died 1348)
- John II Codonatus (ruled in 477), a patriarch of Antioch
- Pope John II, Pope from 533 until his death in 535
- Pope John Paul II, Pope from 1978 until his death in 2005
- Pope John II (III) of Alexandria, Coptic Pope from 505 to 516
- Yohannes II of Ethiopia (died 1769)
- Johann Adolf II, Duke of Saxe-Weissenfels (1685–1746)
- John Albert II, Duke of Mecklenburg (1590–1636)
- John Ernest II, Duke of Saxe-Weimar (1627–1683)
- John Frederick II, Duke of Saxony (1529–1595)
- Hans-Adam II, Prince of Liechtenstein (born 1945)

== Biblical ==
- John 2, the second chapter of the Gospel of John
- Second Epistle of John or 2 John

== See also ==
- Juan II (disambiguation)
- Jean II (disambiguation)
- Johann II (disambiguation)
