= John Paul the Great Catholic University =

Private college in California, US

Coordinates: 33.120858°N 117.082379°W

- Motto: Impact Culture for Christ
- Type: Private college
- Established: 2003
- Religious affiliation: Roman Catholic
- President: Derry Connolly
- Undergraduates: 296
- Location: Escondido, California, United States
- Campus: Urban
- Colors: Red, Gold
- Mascot: Pelican
- Website: www.jpcatholic.edu

John Paul the Great Catholic University (JPCatholic) is a private Catholic college in Escondido, California, United States. It offers Bachelor of Science degrees, a Bachelor of Arts degree, and a Bachelor of Fine Arts degree.

== History ==
John Paul the Great Catholic University was founded in 2003 under the name "New Catholic University." After the death of Pope John Paul II in April 2005, the board of trustees decided to change the name to honor the late Pope, while retaining the word "Catholic" in the official name to emphasize the priorities of the school. John Paul Catholic (JPCatholic) officially opened its doors with the first classes on September 21, 2006, with a temporary campus in Scripps Ranch. The college moved to a permanent campus in Escondido in 2013, holding its first classes there at the start of the Fall 2013 academic quarter. The campus enrollment has grown to serve 300 students.

Class schedules are structured around daily Mass. Confession and Adoration are also available daily.

== Campus ==
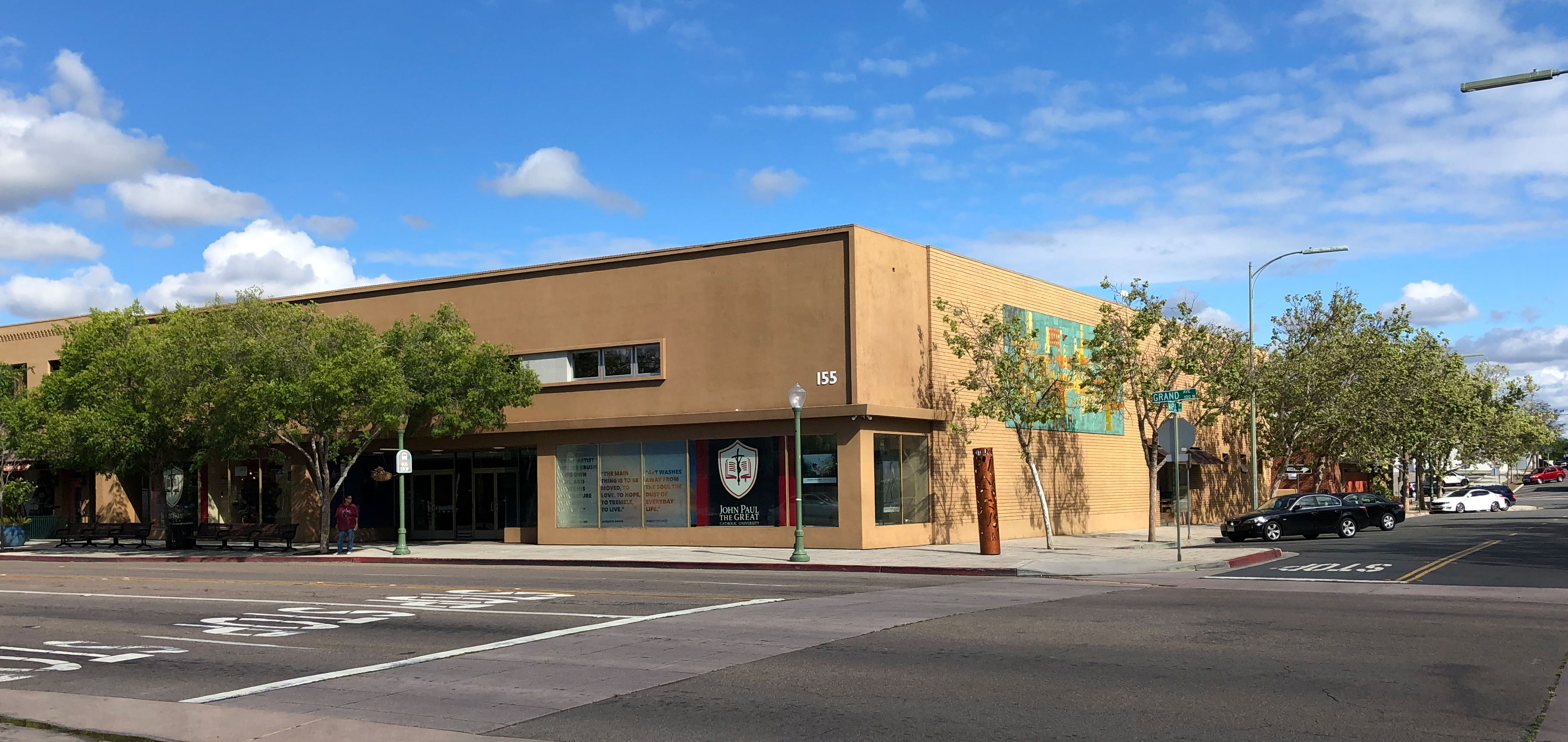
The main academic building of John Paul the Great Catholic University.

JPCatholic is located in downtown Escondido, a city immediately north of San Diego, California, and approximately 30 miles (48 km) north of downtown San Diego. Classrooms, sound stage, and chapel are located in a former Mingei art museum on Grand Avenue, the heart of Escondido's historic downtown, while administrative offices and a student life center are housed in two buildings across the street.

In early 2016, the college purchased a long-vacant furniture store with the intent to renovate the space into a Creative Arts Academic Complex. Renovation began in 2024 and is currently expected to be completed in 2025, doubling the academic space on campus.

This new complex will join a campus that already includes an academic building, administrative building, and student life center across the street. Another building purchased in 2016, but yet unoccupied, will likely become St. Teresa of Calcutta Chapel, when donations become available to complete the necessary renovations.

The campus will double in size with the additional building located at 131 S. Broadway in Escondido being converted into a new 30,000 square foot Creative Arts Academic Complex.

Students live at the Marlowe Palomar Heights apartment complex approximately 0.5 miles (0.80 km) away from the classrooms. It is on the site of the Palomar Medical Center which was demolished in 2021.

== Academics ==
JPCatholic is accredited by the Western Association of Schools and Colleges Senior College and University Commission. The college operates on a non-traditional year-round schedule, with three 10-week quarters per academic year and four quarters per calendar year. Students graduate in three years, beginning the program at the start of a fall quarter and graduating at the end of their third summer quarter. Consequently, there are never more than three "academic classes" of students on campus at any given time.

There is a student to teacher ratio of 19:1.

The college also offers free faculty and guest speaker lectures and self-paced online courses available to the public.

Calendar Year	Fall Quarter	Winter Quarter	Spring Quarter	Summer Quarter
Year 1	Freshman, Q1	Freshman, Q2	Freshman, Q3	Sophomore, Q1
Year 2	Sophomore, Q2	Sophomore, Q3	Junior, Q1	Junior, Q2
Year 3	Junior, Q3	Senior, Q1	Senior, Q2	Senior, Q3

=== Undergraduate degrees ===
JPCatholic offers two Bachelor of Science degree programs, a Bachelor of Arts program, and a Bachelor of Fine Arts program. These degrees contain a total of 19 areas of emphases. Undergraduate students also take core curriculum classes in philosophy, literature, business, and humanities, with a heavy emphasis on Scripture and Catholic theology.

==== Feature Film Program ====
In 2021, JPCatholic launched its Feature Film Program, a platform integrating feature film productions into the curriculum. Students collaborate with alumni and professors to write, pitch, create, and distribute full-length movies. The inspiration for the program was rooted in the university's previous film Red Line from 2012.

In 2022, the movie O, Brawling Love! was produced through the program, with another movie No Reception produced the following year. The films were staffed by a majority student crew, and were shot in the college's soundstage and various locations in the Escondido area.

==== Business LaunchPad and Incubator ====
JPCatholic is noted for its focus on business entrepreneurship, and offers an educational track and resource hub for entrepreneurial students called the Business LaunchPad. Seniors business students work with faculty to develop viable business plans, and use university resources to launch a company.

=== Rankings ===
U.S. News & World Report 2025 ranks the school as #10 (tie) in its "Regional Colleges West" category (104 schools), along with #3 in Best Value. The college is also listed on The Newman Guide to Choosing a Catholic College.

The institution was also ranked among the "Absolute Worst Campuses for LGBTQ Youth" in the US by Campus Pride.
