= John Paul II 4th Secondary School in Tarnów =

IV Liceum Ogólnokształcące im. Jana Pawła II w Tarnowie
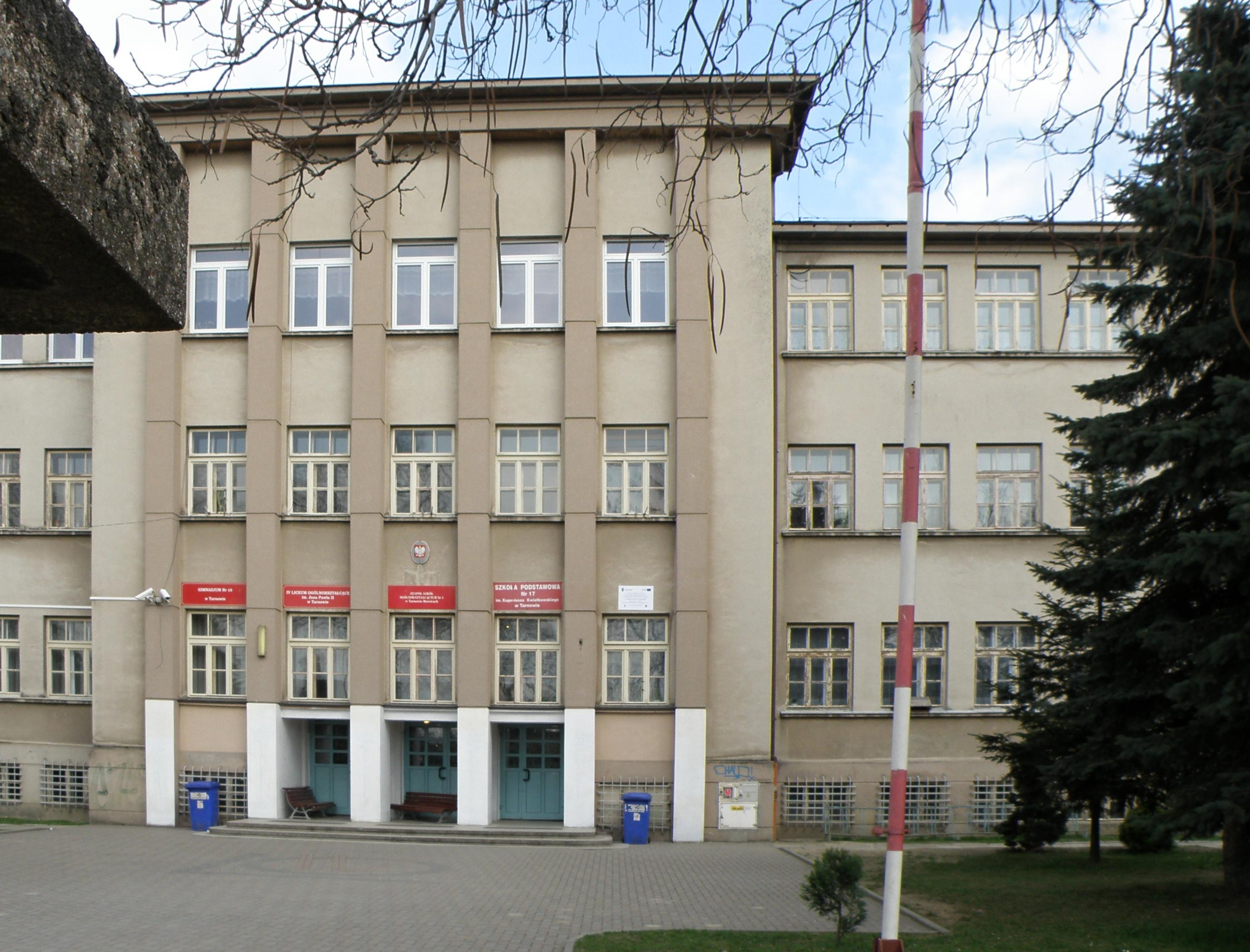

Location
- ul. Norwida 22; 33-101 Tarnów
- Coordinates: 49°59′58″N 20°55′40″E

Information
- Type: Public
- Established: 1945
- Headmaster: Anetta Święch
- Website: www.iv-lo.tarnow.pl

John Paul II High School in Tarnów (Polish: IV Liceum Ogólnokształcące im. Jana Pawła II w Tarnowie) is a general education liceum (high school) in Tarnów, Poland. The school was established in 1945.

== Headteachers ==
- Janina Dembowska 1945-1946
- Jan Grela 1946-1950
- Jan Padlewski 1950-1951
- Aureliusz Dziunikowski 1951-1970
- Barbara Słowik 1969-1970
- Czesław Sterkowicz 1970-1990
- Anna Skórska 1990
- Władysław Węgiel 1990-2007
- Marek Smoła 2007-2017
- Anetta Święch 2017-

== Notable graduates ==
- Michał Heller
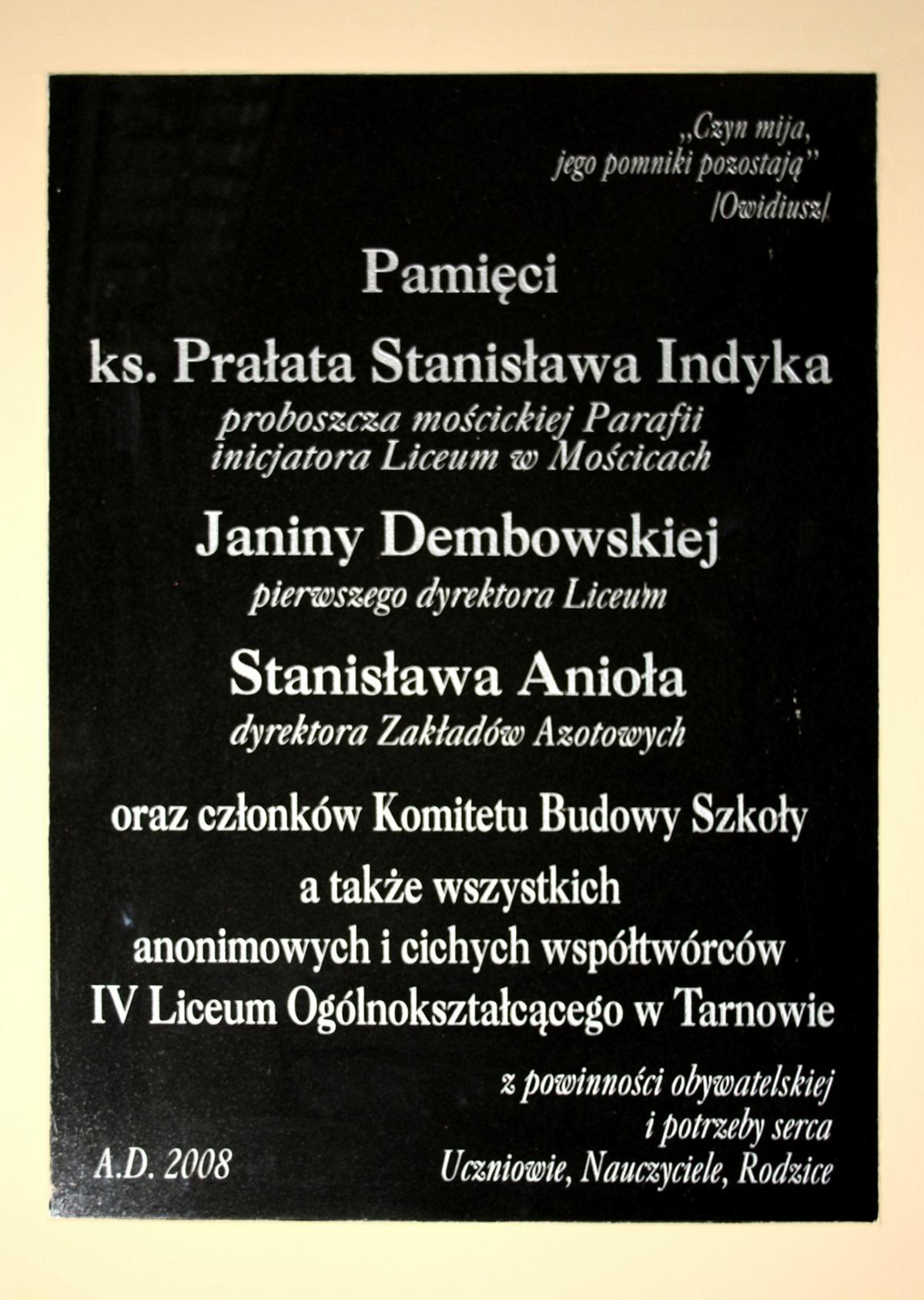

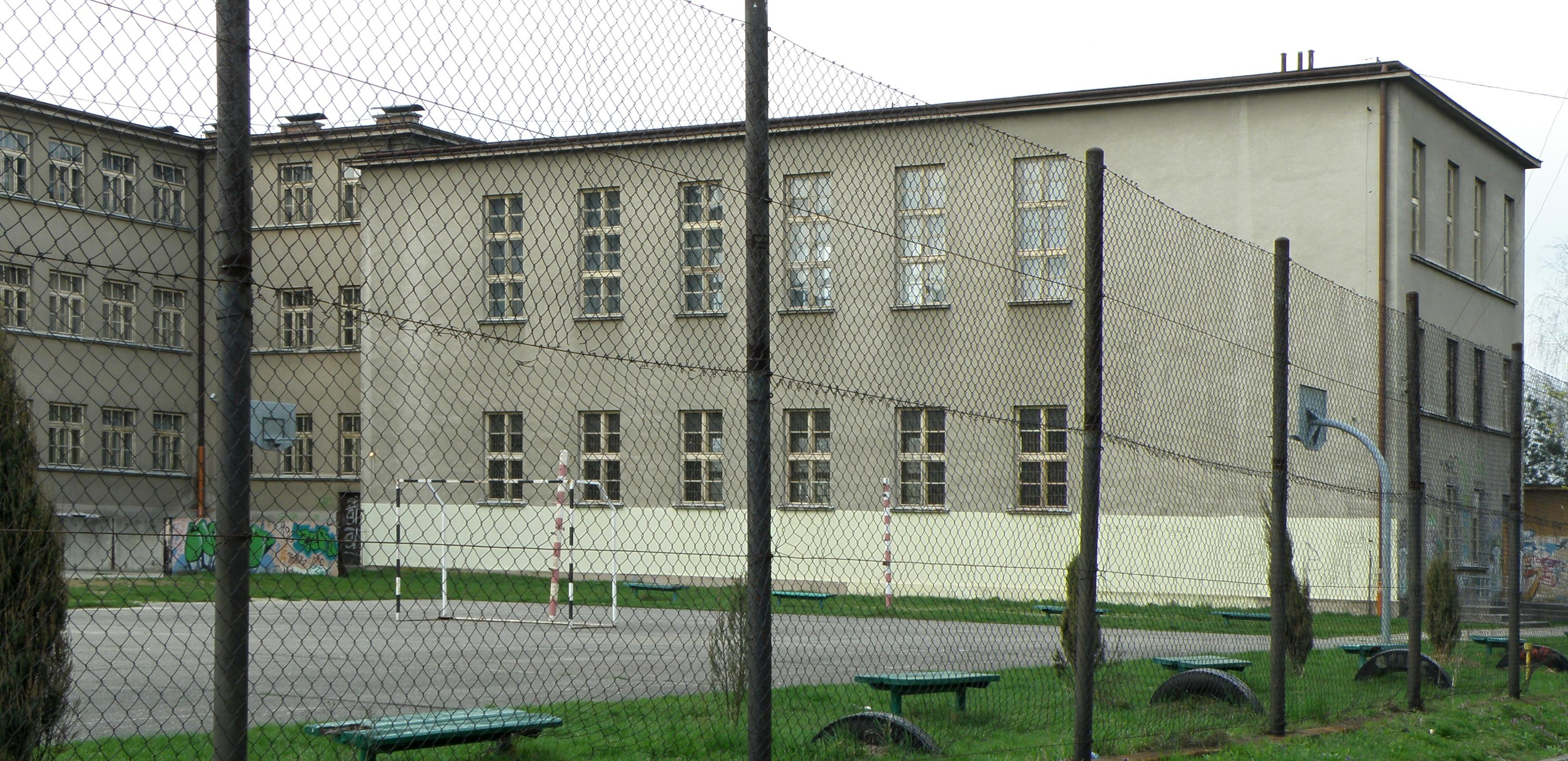

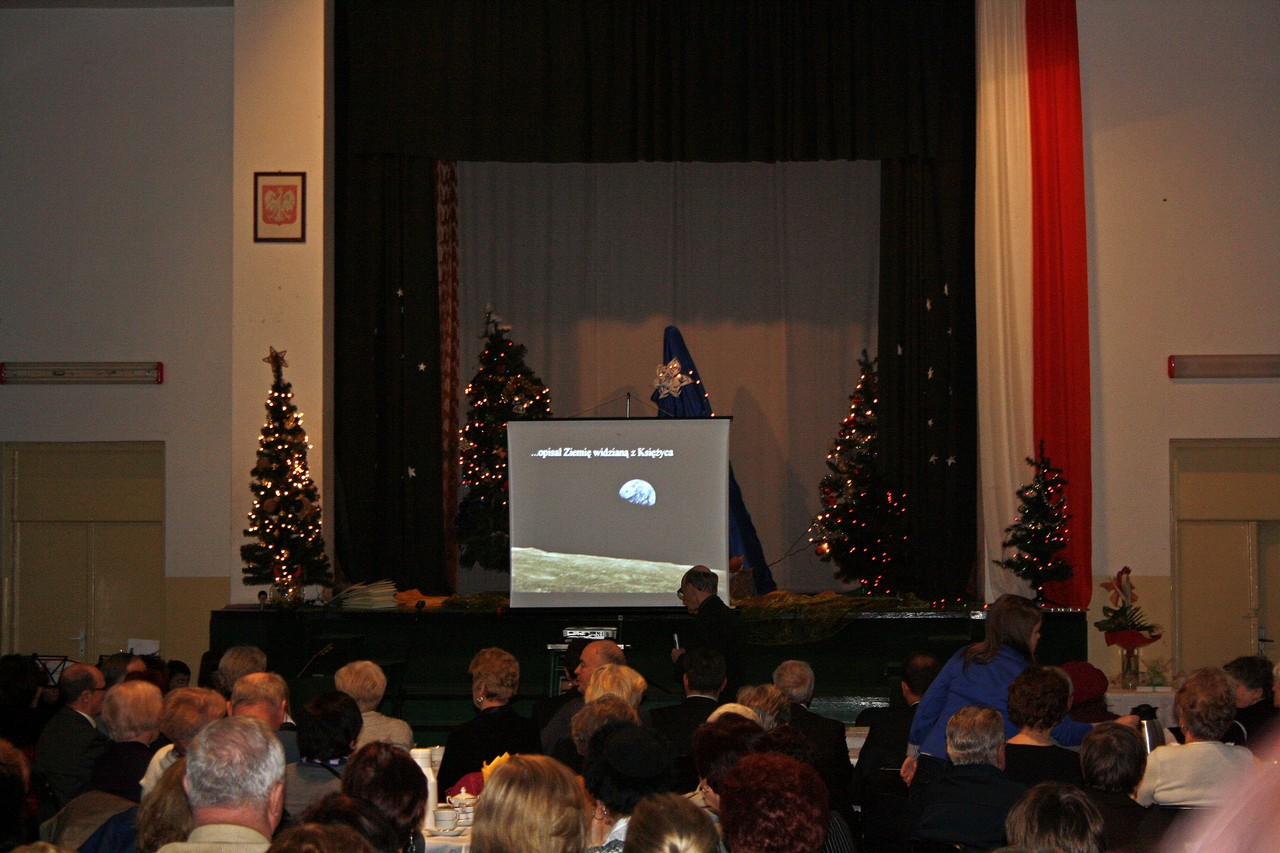
