= John Paul II Bridge (Chile) =

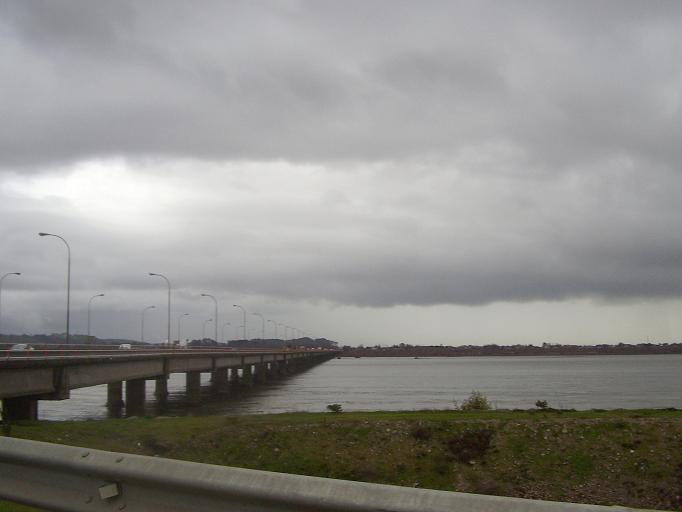
- Juan Pablo II Bridge, view from Concepcion
- Coordinates: 36°49′26″S 73°5′30″W
- Crosses: Bio-Bio River
- Locale: Concepcion & Talcahuano, Greater Concepción and San Pedro de la Paz, Greater Concepción
- Other name: Puente Nuevo (New Bridge) (from 1974 to 1987)

Characteristics
- Total length: 2,310 m (7,580 ft)
- Width: 21.9 m (72 ft)

History
- Opened: April, 1974

Location
- Interactive map of John Paul II Bridge

The John Paul II Bridge (Spanish: Puente Juan Pablo II), also known as the New Bridge (Spanish: Puente Nuevo), is a bridge in Chile connecting Concepción and Talcahuano with San Pedro de la Paz, through the Biobío River. Since completion in 1974 it has remained the longest bridge in the country. It was significantly damaged in the 8.8 magnitude February 27, 2010 Chile earthquake.

== Structure ==
The bridge was designed by E.W.H. Gifford & Partners from England. It is 2310 m. (7.578ft) in length. It is formed by 70 parts of 33 m. each one and with a width of 21.9 m. (including 2 passerby corridors of 1.6 m.)

== Naming ==
When the bridge was finished in 1974, it had no official name,. People began calling it "Puente Nuevo" ("New Bridge"), as it was the second bridge across the Biobío River after "Puente Viejo" ("Old Bridge"), now closed. When Pope John Paul II visited Concepción the bridge was named after him as a tribute.
