= Saint John Paul the Great Catholic High School =

Catholic high school in Dumfries, Virginia

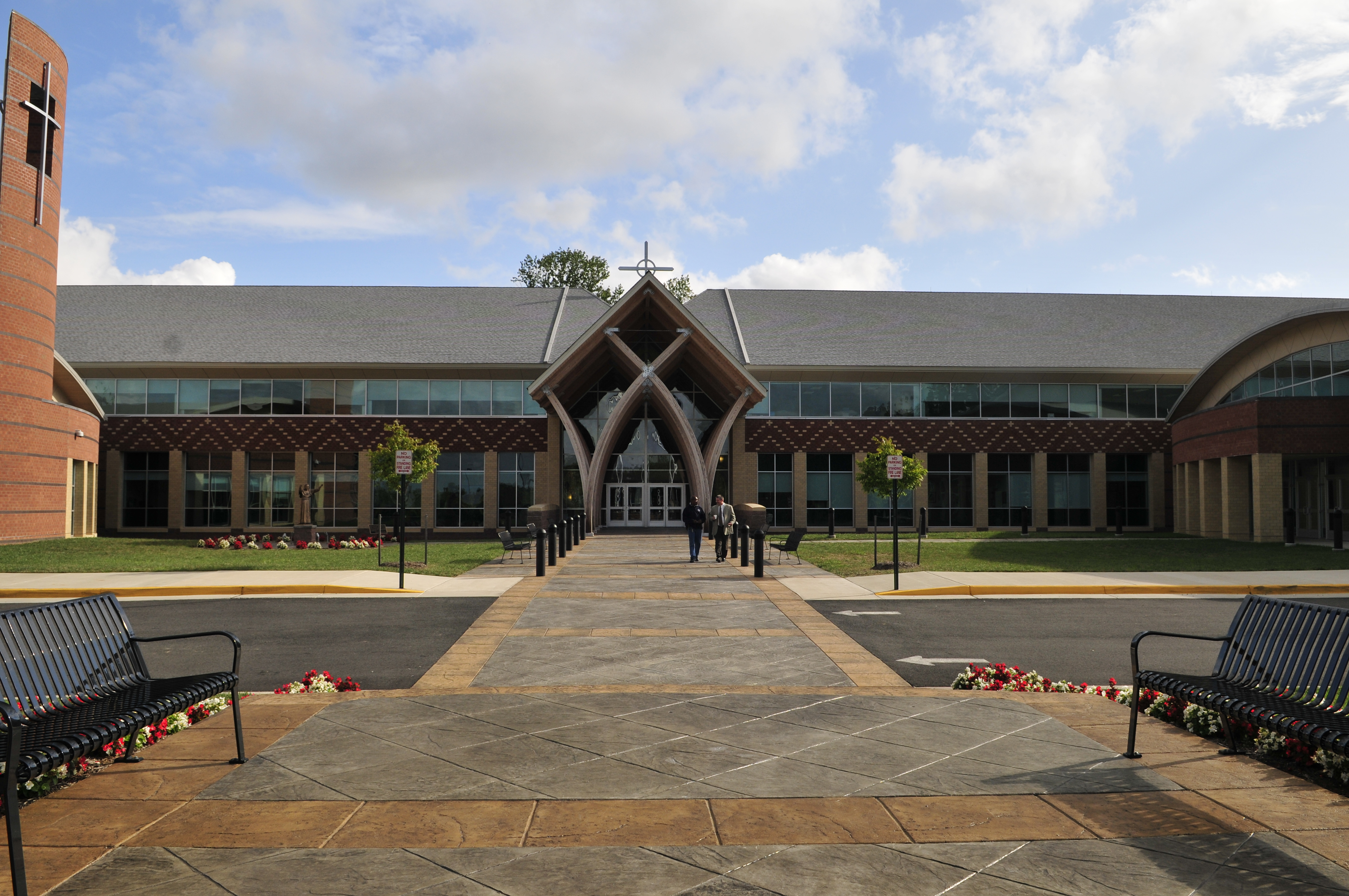
- Front of the school

Location
- 17700 Dominican Drive; Dumfries, (Prince William County), Virginia 22026; United States; 38°34′0″N 77°17′15″W

Information
- Type: Private, Coeducational
- Motto: "Veritas"
- Religious affiliation: Roman Catholic
- Established: 2008
- Authority: Diocese of Arlington
- Oversight: Dominican Sisters of St. Cecilia
- Principal: Shawn McNulty
- Head of school: Sr. Mary Grace Watson
- Chaplain: Jonathan Smith (2026-Present), Christopher Tipton (2020–2026), Keith Cummings (2017–2020), Bjorn Lundberg (2012–2017), Matthew Zuberbueler (2008–2012)
- Key people: Steven Johnson; Paul Hope
- Grades: 9–12
- Enrollment: 662
- Average class size: 20:1
- Classes offered: College Prep; Advanced, Honors, AP and Dual Enrollment
- Campus size: 40 acres (160,000 m^{2})
- Colors: Green, Black and White
- Mascot: Wolfy
- Team name: Wolfpack
- Accreditation: SACS
- Website: http://www.jpthegreat.org/

Saint John Paul the Great Catholic High School is a private, college preparatory, coeducational Catholic high school in Dumfries, Virginia, led by the Dominican Sisters of St. Cecilia. As a diocesan school of the Diocese of Arlington, it is accredited by the Southern Association of Colleges and Schools.

In 2012, it was included in the Cardinal Newman Society's Top 50 Catholic High Schools list. It was placed on the list again in 2014.

In 2013, it was chosen by the editors of Virginia Living magazine as a 2013 Top Virginia School.

== History ==
The school broke ground in September 2006 as the newest high school in the Diocese of Arlington with a construction cost of a state of the art facility at $60 million, funded by bonds, donations, and a capital campaign. The school was built on 40 acres of land, valued at $14.5 million, that was given to the diocese.

In October 2007, the diocese announced that the school would be named after Pope John Paul II.

The school is led and taught by the Dominican Sisters of St. Cecilia, commonly known as the Nashville Dominicans, a teaching order of religious sisters known to be much younger on average than other Catholic religious orders.

The newly constructed school opened to incoming 9th and 10th graders in August 2008. The school's first graduating class graduated in 2011. Graduates from the Class of 2012 and 2013 were accepted into universities, including Ivy League schools, military appointments, Catholic institutions, and other Virginia schools. Combined, these students earned more than $12 million in academic scholarships to the universities of their choice.

In August 2013 the school opened with more than 600 students. The school intends to have an eventual capacity of 1,000 students.

In May 2014 it was announced that, following John Paul II's canonization the previous month, the name of the school would be changed to Saint John Paul the Great.

In September 2020 the school was one of the first in its area to reopen to a half virtual, half in person class schedule in wake of the COVID-19 pandemic.

The school is the only high school in the U.S. to offer a 4-year Catholic Bioethics Curriculum, and has a house system (Aquino, Castello, Diego, Dominic, Gianna, Martin, More, Ruiz), with eight houses named after Roman Catholic saints. Houses compete against each other throughout the month to earn the title "House of the Month" and eventually, "House of the Year".

== Sports ==
The school offers 22 sports. In 2009, the varsity football team completed their second season with a record of 9-1 and was the first team to represent the school in a state playoff tournament. The junior varsity boys basketball posted the first winning record for a basketball team with nine wins and three losses.

In the 2010-2011 school year, both JV soccer and JV basketball went undefeated with soccer having an 11-0 season and basketball a 14-0 season.

In 2012, John Paul the Great's boys Track & Field team won the Virginia Catholic State Championship, the first state championship won in the school's history. The boys' track and field team won the Catholic State Championship again in 2014, 2015, 2016, 2019, 2021, and 2024.

The girls Track & Field team won the Virginia Catholic State Championship in 2015.

The boys Cross Country team won the Virginia Catholic Schools State Championship in 2017, 2018, 2019, 2021, 2022, 2023, and 2024, and had individual champions in 2012, 2014, 2015, 2021, 2023, and 2024. In 2021, the boys team won the VISAA Cross Country Championships. Since 2012, there have been 24 individual All-State performances at the VISAA Cross Country Championships.

Since 2012, there have been 12 individual All-State performances on the girls Cross Country team at the VISAA Cross Country Championships.

In 2015, The Varsity boys football team produced a good record at 7-3 and once more clinched the State Playoffs. They lost in the first round to Bishop Ireton, who went on to lose to the State Champions, the Benedictine School.

== See also ==
- WJPN-LP
