= 1609 in music =

The year 1609 in music involved some significant events.

== Events ==
- October 12 – A version of the rhyme "Three Blind Mice" is published in Deuteromelia or The Seconde part of Musicks melodie (London). The editor, and possible author of the verse, is the teenage Thomas Ravenscroft. This collection follows his publication of the first rounds in English, Pammelia.
- Heinrich Schütz comes to Venice to study under Giovanni Gabrieli.
- Francis Tregian the Younger is imprisoned in England, partly for his Catholic sympathies, and perhaps begins copying out the Fitzwilliam Virginal Book.

== Publications ==
- Agostino Agazzari – 6 Psalms, Op. 12 (Venice: Ricciardo Amadino)
- Gregor Aichinger
  - Sacrae Dei laudes sub officio divino concinendae... (Dillingen: Adam Meltzer)
  - Teutsche Gesenglein: auss dem Psalter dess H. Propheten Davids... (Dillingen: Adam Meltzer)
  - Quercus dodonea (Augsburg: Johann Praetorius)
- Giovanni Francesco Anerio – Motets for one, two, and three voices (Rome: Giovanni Battista Robletti)
- Ludovico Balbi – Completorium for twelve voices in three choirs (Venice: Alessandro Raverii), published posthumously, includes versicles, responsories, hymns, antiphons, and motets for Compline for the entire year
- Adriano Banchieri – Gemelli armonici, Op. 21 (Harmonic twins) (Venice: Ricciardo Amadino), a collection of motets for two voices
- Severo Bonini
  - First book of motets for three voices, Op. 3 (Venice: Alessandro Raverii)
  - Second book of madrigals and motets for solo voices with harpsichord, theorbo, and organ (Florence: Cristofano Marescotti)
- Bernardino Borlasca – Scherzi musicali ecclesiastici sopra la cantica for three voices and continuo (Venice: Alessandro Raverii)
- William Brade – Newe außerlesene Paduanen, Galliarden, Canzonen, Allmand und Coranten (Hamburg: Michael Hering), a collection of dance music for five instruments
- Eustache du Caurroy – Preces ecclesiasticae (Church prayers) (Paris: Pierre Ballard), two volumes of sacred music for three to seven voices
- Antonio Cifra
  - First book of motets for two, three, and four voices (Venice: Giacomo Vincenti)
  - Second book of motets for two, three, and four voices (Rome: Giovanni Battista Robletti)
  - Third book of motets for two, three, and four voices (Rome: Giovanni Battista Robletti)
  - 7 Psalms for four voices, Op. 7 (Rome: Giovanni Battista Robletti)
  - Fourth book of motets for two, three, and four voices, Op. 8 (Rome: Giovanni Battista Robletti)
- Camillo Cortellini – Masses for four, five, six, and eight voices with basso continuo (Venice: Giacomo Vincenti)
- Christoph Demantius – Covivialium concentuum for six voices (Jena: Christoph Lippold for David Kauffmann), a collection of madrigals, canzonettas, and villanelle in German
- Alfonso Ferrabosco the younger
  - Ayres for one and two voices with lute and bass instrument (London: Thomas Snodham for John Browne)
  - Lessons for 1. 2. and 3. viols (London: Thomas Snodham for John Browne), includes music for staged works by Ben Jonson
- Giacomo Finetti – Omnia in nocte Nativitatis Domini nostri Iesu Christi, quae ad matinum spectant for five voices (Venice: Angelo Gardano), music for Christmas
- Melchior Franck – Gratulationes Musicae (Coburg: Justus Hauck), a wedding song
- Bartholomäus Gesius
  - Melodiae scholasticae sub horarum intervallis decantandae (Frankfurt an der Oder: Friedrich Hartmann)
  - Hymni patrum cum canticis sacris, latinis et germanicis, de praecipuis festis anniversarijs for four voices (Frankfurt an der Oder: Friedrich Hartmann)
  - Psalm 132 for eight voices (Frankfurt an der Oder: Friedrich Hartmann), a graduation motet
  - Psalm 128 for eight voices (Frankfurt an der Oder: Friedrich Hartmann), a wedding motet
- Sigismondo d'India – Le musiche da cantar solo (Milan: Simon Tini & Filippo Lomazzo), songs for solo voice with accompaniment
- Giovanni Girolamo Kapsberger – First book of madrigals for five voices with basso continuo (Rome: Pietro Manelfi)
- Carolus Luython – First book of masses (Prague: Nicolaus Straus)
- Tiburtio Massaino – Quaerimoniae cum responsoriis infra hebdomadam sanctam concinendae for five voices, Op. 34 (Venice: Alessandro Raverii)
- Ascanio Mayone – Secondo libro di diversi capricci per sonare (Naples: Giovanni Battista Gargano & Lucrezio Nucci), a collection of keyboard music
- Claudio Merulo – 2 Masses for eight and twelve voices with organ bass (Venice: Angelo Gardano & fratelli), published posthumously
- Simone Molinaro – Third book of motets for five voices with basso continuo (Venice: Alessandro Raverii)
- Claudio Monteverdi – L'Orfeo (published in Venice; performed in 1607).
- Johannes Nucius – Cantionum sacrarum for five and six voices, 2 books (Legnica: Nicolaus Sartorius)
- Jacopo Peri – Le varie musiche for one, two, and three voices (Florence: Cristoforo Marescotti)
- John Wilbye – The Second Set Of Madrigales To 3. 4. 5. and 6. parts, apt both for Voyals and Voyces
- Il primo libro de madrigali for five voices and continuo, by members of the Nantermi family

== Popular music ==
- Thomas Ravenscroft
  - Pammelia
  - Deuteromelia

== Births ==
- date unknown – Alberich Mazak, Austrian composer (died 1661)

== Deaths ==
- January 4 – Giovanni Giacomo Gastoldi, choral composer (born c.1554)
- February 28 – Paul Sartorius, composer and organist (born 1569)
- March 29 – Pau Villalonga, Spanish composer of sacred polyphony
- ?May – Mikołaj Gomółka, Polish court composer (born 1535)
- May 15 – Giovanni Croce, composer (born 1557)
- July 19 – Nicolas Gistou, Flemish counter-tenor musician and composer at the Danish court (born c.1560)
- August 7 – Eustache du Caurroy, French composer (born 1549)
- ?September – Piero Strozzi, composer (born 1550)
- September 2 – Ippolito Baccusi, composer of the Venetian School (born c.1550)
- October 1 – Giammateo Asola, Italian composer (born 1532)
- date unknown
  - Kanaka Dasa, poet, philosopher, musician and composer of Carnatic music (born 1509)
  - John Hilton the elder, English countertenor, organist and composer (born 1565)
