= 1611 in music =

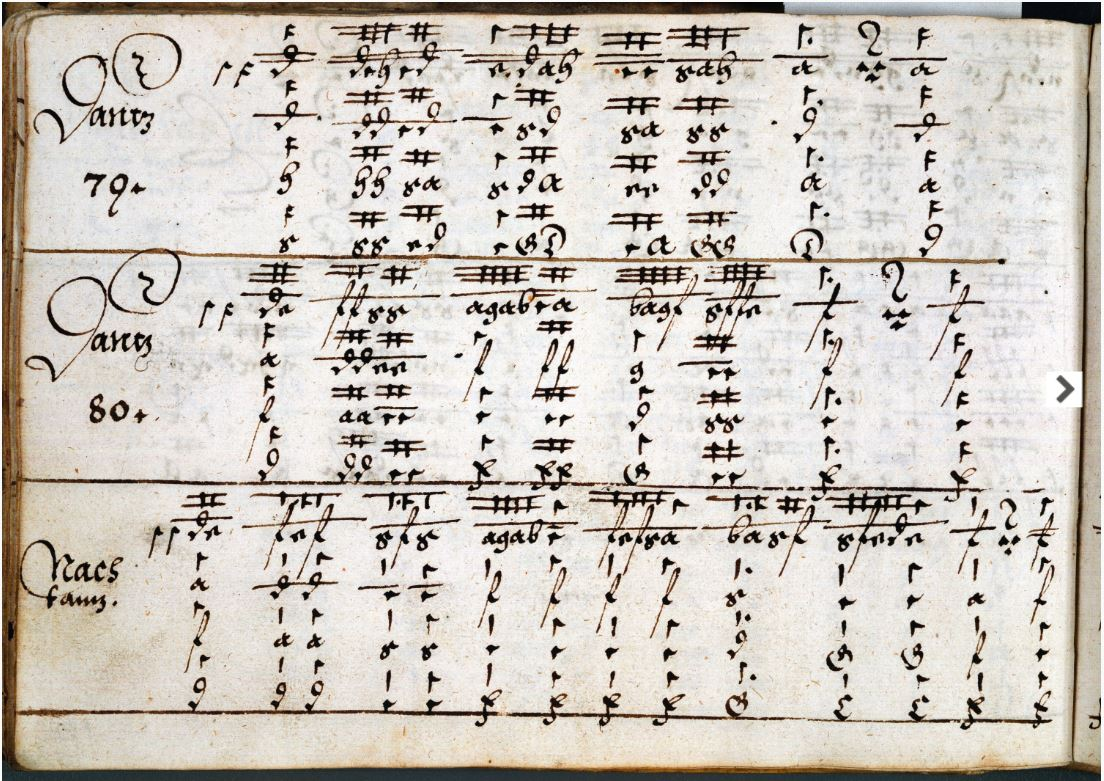

The year 1611 in music involved some significant events.

== Events ==
- January 1 – Oberon, the Faery Prince, a masque written by Ben Jonson and designed by Inigo Jones, is performed at Whitehall Palace; it features music by Alfonso Ferrabosco the younger and Robert Johnson.
- February 3 – Love Freed from Ignorance and Folly, another Jonson/Jones masque, is performed at Whitehall, with music by Ferrabosco.

== Publications ==
- Agostino Agazzari
  - Psalms and a Magnificat for five voices, Op. 13 (Venice: Ricciardo Amadino)
  - Sertum roseum ex plantis Hiericho, Op. 14 (Venice: Ricciardo Amadino), a collection of sacred songs
  - Chorus psalmorum ac Magnificat... for eight voices, Op. 15 (Venice: Ricciardo Amadino)
- Giovanni Francesco Anerio
  - Second book of motets (Rome: Bartolomeo Zannetti)
  - Litaniae deiparae virginis (Rome: Bartolomeo Zannetti)
  - Recreatione armonica, madrigals for one and two voices (Venice: Angelo Gardano & fratelli)
- Robert Ballard – a collection of arrangements for the lute.
- Valerio Bona
  - Li dilettevoli introiti della messa a doi chori brevi, facili, & ariosi (Delightful introits of the mass for two choirs, short, easy, & airy), Op. 18 (Venice: Giacomo Vincenti)
  - Masses and Vespers for four choirs, Op. 19 (Venice: Giacomo Vincenti)
- Bernardino Borlasca – Second book of canzonettas for three voices (Venice: Giacomo Vincenti)
- William Byrd – Psalms, Songs, and Sonnets for three, four, five, and six parts (London: Thomas East for William Barley)
- Antonio Cifra – 7 Psalms for four voices, Op. 10 (Rome: Giovanni Battista Robletti)
- Christoph Demantius – Threnodiae (Quis dabit oculis nostris fontem) for six voices (Leipzig: Abraham Lamberg), funeral music to commemorate the death of Christian II, Elector of Saxony on June 23
- Christian Erbach – Sacrarum cantionum, third book, for four and five voices (Augsburg: Johann Praetorius)
- Giacomo Finetti
  - Psalmi ad vesperas in solemnitate sanctissimi corporis Christi for eight voices (Venice: Angelo Gardano & fratelli), Vespers psalms for Corpus Christi
  - Second book of motets for two voices (Venice: Angelo Gardano & fratelli)
- Melchior Franck
  - Tricinia nova (New Trios) (Nuremberg: David Kauffmann)
  - Vincula Natalitia for five, six, and eight voices (Coburg: Justus Hauck), birthday motets
  - Opusculum for four, five, six, and eight voices (Coburg: Justus Hauck), a collection of motets
  - Fasciculus Quodlibeticus for four, five, six, and eight voices (Coburg: Justus Hauck), a collection of quodlibets
  - Gratulationes Musicae for five voices (Coburg: Justus Hauck), two wedding songs with psalm texts
  - Ein schöner Trostreicher Text (Mir hastu arbeit gemacht) auß dem 43. Capitel Esaiae for five voices (Coburg: Justus Hauck), a birthday song with text from Isaiah 43
- Bartholomäus Gesius
  - Missae ad imitationem cantionum Orlandi, et aliorum probatissimorum musicorum for five voices (Frankfurt an der Oder: Friedrich Hartmann)
  - Echo maritalis for eight voices (Frankfurt an der Oder: Friedrich Hartmann), a wedding motet
- Carlo Gesualdo
  - Fifth book of madrigals for five voices (Naples: Giovanni Giacomo Carlino)
  - Sixth book of madrigals for five voices (Naples: Giovanni Giacomo Carlino)
  - Responsoria et alia ad Officium Hebdomadae Sanctae spectantia, for six voices (Naples: Giovanni Giacomo Carlino)
- Sigismondo d'India – Second book of madrigals for five voices (Venice: Angelo Gardano & fratelli)
- Giovanni Girolamo Kapsberger – Libro primo d'intavolatura di lauto (Rome)
- Claudio Merulo – Third book of canzoni d’intavolatura d’organo (Venice: Angelo Gardano), published posthumously
- Giovanni Bernardino Nanino – Second book of motets for one, two, three, four, and five voices with organ bass (Rome: Giovanni Battista Robletti)
- Jonas Germundi Palma — Een christeligh jula songh... (Stockholm: Christoph Reusner)
- Angelo Paoletti – Sacrae cantiones (Rome: Giovanni Battista Robletti)
- Claudio Pari – Il pastor fido, second book of madrigals for five voices (Palermo: Giovanni Battista Maringo)
- Parthenia, a collection of keyboard music by John Bull, William Byrd, and Orlando Gibbons
- Serafino Patta — Sacra cantica... (Venice: Giacomo Vincenti)

== Popular music ==
- Thomas Ravenscroft – Melismata

== Opera ==
- Giulio Cesare Monteverdi – Il rapimento di Proserpina

== Births ==
- June 22 – Pablo Bruna, blind organist and composer (died 1679)
- December – Leonora Baroni, singer, instrumentalist and composer (died 1670)
- date unknown – Thomas Brewer, composer who introduced the "glee"

== Deaths ==
- July – Simon Lohet, organist and composer (born c. 1550)
- August 20 – Tomás Luis de Victoria, composer (born c. 1548)
- date unknown
  - Livia d'Arco, singer (born c. 1565)
  - Pierre-Francisque Caroubel, violinist and composer (born 1556)
  - Johannes Eccard, composer and conductor (born 1553)
  - Gioseffo Guami, organist, singer and composer (born c. 1540)
