= Joan Pau =

Joan Pau is a Catalan masculine given name. Notable people with the name include:

- Joan Pau Pujol (1570-1626), Catalan composer and organist
- Joan Pau Verdier (born 1947), Catalan singer

== See also ==
- Joan (given name)
- Pau (given name)
- Jean-Paul (disambiguation), French-language equivalent
- John Paul (given name), English-language equivalent
- Juan Pablo, Spanish-language equivalent
- João Paulo (disambiguation), Portuguese-language equivalent
