= John Paul =

John Paul may refer to:

== People ==
=== Given name ===
- John Paul (given name), a list of bearers of the name, and equivalent names in other languages
- Pope John Paul I (1912–1978)
- Pope John Paul II (1920–2005)

=== Given name and surname ===
- John Paul (actor) (1921–1995), British actor
- John Paul (artist) (1804–1887), English painter
- John Paul (colonial administrator) (1916–2004), British government official
- John Paul (footballer) (1873–?), British footballer
- John Paul (judge) (1839–1901), American politician and judge
- John Paul Jr. (judge) (1883–1964), American politician and judge
- John Paul (minister) (1795–1873), Scottish minister
- John Paul (pioneer) (1758–1830), American politician and city founder
- John Paul (priest) (1928–2009), Scottish Anglican dean of Moray, Ross and Caithness
- John Paul (medical scientist) (1922–1994) biomedical research scientist
- John Paul (screenwriter) (1950–2022), Indian screenwriter
- John Paul Sr. (racing driver) (1939–?), disappeared 2001, American automobile racing driver
- John Paul Jr. (racing driver) (1960–2020), American automobile racing driver
- Sir John Dean Paul, 1st Baronet (1775–1852), English banker, landowner and painter
- Sir John Dean Paul, 2nd Baronet, partner in the Strahan, Paul & Bates bank which collapsed in 1855
- John Joseph Paul (1918–2006), American Roman Catholic bishop
- John R. Paul (1893–1971), American virologist
- John Thomas Paul (1874–1964), New Zealand compositor, trade unionist, politician, editor, journalist and censor
- John Paul Jones (1747–1792), born John Paul, American naval commander in the Revolutionary War

== See also ==
- John Paul II (disambiguation)
- Johnpaul George, Indian Malayalam-language filmmaker
- Johnpaul Jones (born 1941), American architect
- Ioannes Paulus (disambiguation)
- Giovanni Paolo (disambiguation)
- Jan Pawel (disambiguation)
- Jean-Paul (disambiguation)
- João Paulo (disambiguation), a given name
- Juan Pablo, a name
- John and Paul, 4th century Christian martyrs
