= Jan Pawel =

Jan Paweł is a Polish compound given name equivalent to John Paul (given name).

Jan Pawel or Jan Paweł or variation may refer to:

== People ==
=== Given name "Jan Pawel" ===
- Jan Paweł II, the first Polish pope
- Jan Paweł Biretowski (1705–1781), Polish scholar
- Jan Paweł Kruk (born 1943), Polish actor
- Jan Paweł Lelewel (1796–1847), Polish military engineer
- Jan Paweł Łuszczewski (1764–1812), Polish politician
- Jan Paweł Nowacki (1905–1979), German-Polish electrical engineer
- Jan Paweł Pietrzak (1984–2008), see murders of Jan Pawel and Quiana Jenkins Pietrzak

=== Given name Jan + Pawel ===
- Jan Ziobro (politician) (born 1989, as Jan Paweł Ziobro), Polish politician
- Jan Pawłowski (born 1992, as Jan Paweł Pawłowski), Polish soccer player
- Jan P. Matuszyński (born 1984, as Jan Paweł Matuszyński), Polish director
- Jan Puzyna de Kosielsko (1842–1911, born as Prince Jan Duklan Maurycy Paweł Puzyna de Kosielsko), Polish cardinal
- Jan A. P. Kaczmarek (born 1953, as Jan Andrzej Paweł Kaczmarek), Polish composer
- Jan Bednarek (politician) (born 1955, as Jan Paweł Bednarek), Polish politician

== Other uses ==
Jana Pawla or Jana Pawła, the Polish genitive form of "Jan Pawel", may refer to:

- Kraków Airport im. Jana Pawła II (John Paul II Airport in Krakow)
- Muzeum Kolekcji Jana Pawła II w Warszawie (John Paul II Museum Collection of Warsaw)
- Muzeum Katedralne im. Jana Pawla II na Wawelu (John Paul II Cathedral Museum in Wawel)
- Katolicki Uniwersytet Lubelski Jana Pawła II (John Paul II Catholic University at Lublin)
- Stadion Jana Pawla II (John Paul II Stadium), Krakow, Poland

== See also ==
- Paweł Jan Sapieha (1609–1665), Lithuanian nobleman of the Polish-Lithuanian Commonwealth
- Paweł Jan Działyński (1594–1643), Polish voivode governor
- John Paul (disambiguation)
- Pawel, a given name
