= Jan Ziobro =

Jan Ziobro may refer to:

- Jan Ziobro (ski jumper)
- Jan Ziobro (politician)
