= Giampaolo =

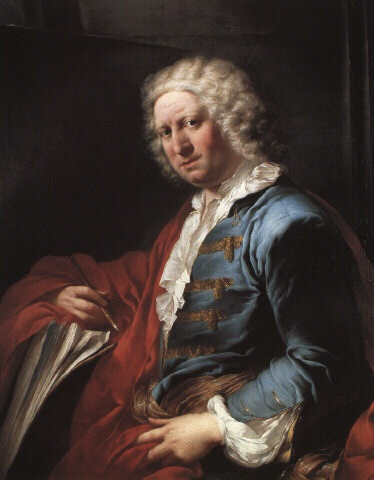
- Gian Paolo Pannini

Other gender
- Feminine: Giovanna Paola

Other names
- Variant forms: Gianpaolo, Gian Paolo
- Anglicisation: John Paul
- Related names: Giovanni, Paolo

Giampaolo or Gianpaolo is a masculine double name, composed of the Italian names Giovanni and Paolo. Giampaolo or Gianpaolo is an apocopated and blended form of the name Giovanni Paolo. Giampaolo is the equivalent form of the English double name John Paul.

The name Giampaolo is one of the most popular double names in the Italian language. It has also been spelled as Giovanni Paolo, Giovan Paolo, Gian Paolo, Gianni Paolo, among others.

== Given name ==
- Gianpaolo Ambrosi, Italian luger
- Gianpaolo Bellini, Italian footballer
- Giampaolo Caruso, Italian road bicycle racer
- Giampaolo Dallara, Italian businessman and motorsports engineer
- Gianpaolo Grisandi, Italian cyclist
- Giampaolo Mazza, Sammarinese manager
- Giampaolo Menichelli, Italian footballer
- Gianpaolo Mondini, Italian former road bicycle racer
- Gianpaolo Ormezzano, Italian journalist, writer, and TV personality
- Giampaolo Pazzini, Italian footballer
- Giampaolo Rugarli, Italian novelist
- Giampaolo Stuani, Italian pianist
- Giampaolo Urlando, Italian hammer thrower

== Surname ==
- Dominic Giampaolo, American software developer
- Federico Giampaolo, Italian footballer
- Sebastian Giampaolo Italian-Australian Soccer Player
- Marco Giampaolo, Italian football manager

== See also ==
- Giampaoli
- Giovanni (name)
- Paolo (disambiguation)
