= Melismata =

Melismata may refer to:

- Melisma, the singing of a single syllable of text while moving between several different notes in succession
- The name of a collection of folk songs by Thomas Ravenscroft (c. 1588 – 1635)
