= Dogs of Roman Britain =

Dogs of Roman Britain concerns the presence of dogs within Britain under Roman occupation. Through various excavations in the Province of Britannia, evidence for a variety of uses from dogs has been found. There has been evidence of cultural involvement and significance of dogs found among the remains of excavated sites. Along with this are written references to the use of dogs as well.

The Roman Province of Britannia was known for exporting dogs. The references by Roman writers to these dogs suggest that British dogs were both fast and strong, useful in hunting and even in war. Some modern dog book authors are of the opinion that these dogs were a distinct breed of dog, and that this breed was the progenitor to the English Mastiff and possibly the Bulldog.

== Cultural significance ==
Dogs are often portrayed in religion with the gods or goddess they are attributed to.

Despite worship for the goddess Nehalennia extending farther than the English Channel, the imagery of the deity with a lap-dog alongside her is frequently associated with the protection of merchants sailing from the Rhine and Mosel to Britain. This dog has been described by a variety of sources as anything similar to a greyhound, a Yorkshire terrier, or a Welsh Springer Spaniel.

=== Agassian ===
There is a strong breed of hunting dog, small in size but no less worthy of great praise. These the wild tribes of Britons with their tattooed backs rear and call by the name of Agassian. Their size is like that of worthless and greedy domestic table dogs; squat, emaciated, shaggy, dull of eye, but endowed with feet armed with powerful claws and a mouth sharp with close-set venomous tearing teeth. It is by virtue of its nose, however, that the Agassian is most exalted, and for tracking it is the best there is; for it is very adept at discovering the tracks of things that walk upon the ground, and skilled too at marking the airborne scent. —Oppian, early 3rd century.

Likewise, Sucellus is also pictured with a dog. However, in this instance, it represents a connection with the underworld.

Other cultural practices associated with dogs are funerary practices. As dogs were seen to have a connection to the underworld, placing figurines of dogs with the dead was thought to help souls with passage.

Dogs were also connected to health as they were thought to have healing powers. The Romans thought dogs were only susceptible to gout, distemper, or rabies, and so puppies were often used as a sponge to transfer the pain.

== Historical references ==
The ancient Roman poet Grattius (or Grattius Faliscus) wrote of British dogs, describing them as superior to the ancient Greek Molossus, saying:

What if you choose to penetrate even among the Britons? How great your reward, how great your gain beyond any outlays! If you are not bent on looks and deceptive graces (this is the one defect of the British whelps), at any rate when serious work has come, when bravery must be shown, and the impetuous War-god calls in the utmost hazard, then you could not admire the renowned Molossians so much.

The ancient Greek historian Strabo reported that dogs were exported from Britain for the purpose of game hunting, and that these dogs were also used by the Celts as war dogs.

The Roman writer Tacitus, in the first century AD, mentions in his accounts of Britain that its principal exports were grain, hides, cattle, iron, silver, slaves, and clever hunting-dogs.

The late Roman poet Nemesianus referred to British dogs, describing them as swift and suited to hunting. The even later Roman poet Claudian describes British dogs "that can break the neck of mighty bulls", in a literal flight of poetic licence - all the dog-types that are named, follow Diana's companions in heavenly chariots through the clouds.

== Hunting ==
British hunting dogs, despite their role as herding and guard animals, were widely considered to be physically superior to the militarized Molossus of Epirus. In the direct description of what some presume to be a predecessor to the English Mastiff breed, Strabo describes British hunting dogs as notably clever. In other writing, he references hunting dogs being a primary export of British trade as a result of this high quality.

A marble epitaph to a hunting dog called Margarita (pearl) from Gaul was put up at Rome in the first or second century AD. This highly unusual inscription uses Virgilian language and says she used to lie in her master and mistress' laps and rest on a blanket rather than have to endure heavy harnesses or beatings. The inscription can be seen in the British Museum.

== Pets ==
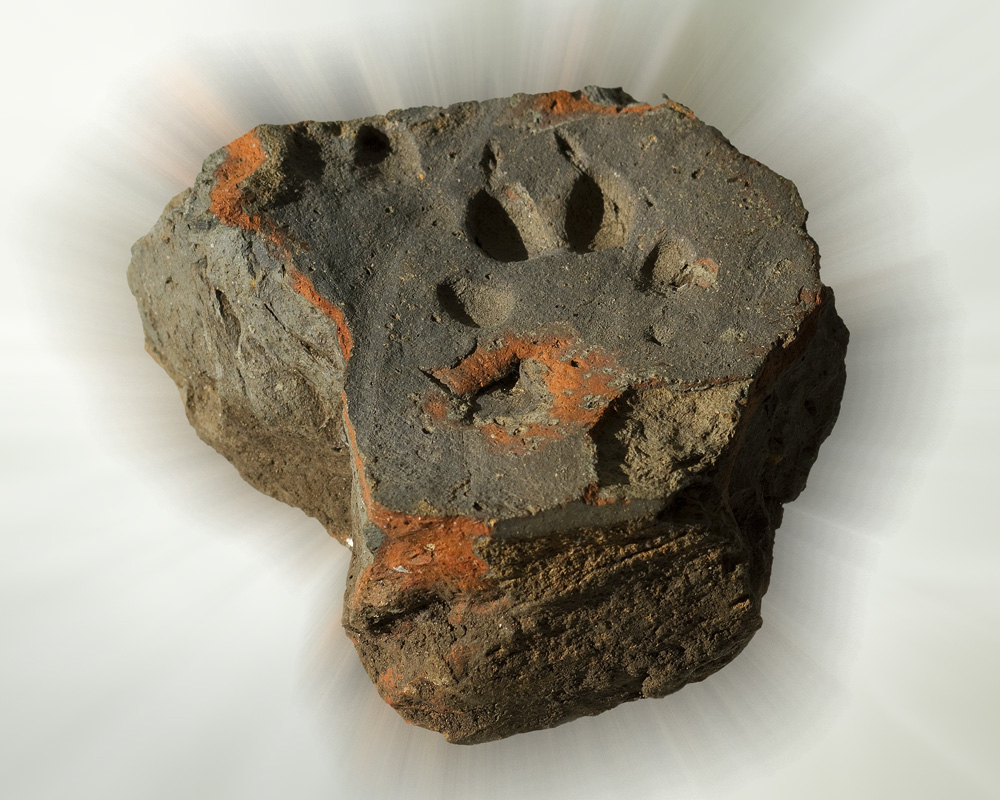
A paw print found in a Roman tile

Through zooarchaeological research, evidence has been found that supports the idea that domestic dog ownership was prevalent in Roman Britain. Human care for dogs can be seen in the analysis of the bones left behind.

Canine burials have few credible instances in Roman Britain, and it difficult to measure the relation the colony's inhabitants had with domestic dogs for this reason. Within the remains of one site in La Bourse, Marseille (France), it can be deduced that the recovered dog had significant dental issues that were sustained for a while. Evidence such as the loss of its maxillary teeth and the unusual amount of calculus buildup proves that this dog would have needed human care in order to eat. With this knowledge alongside the apparent abundance of the animals in Roman British life, it is likely that such dogs were treated equally in this regard.

However, terminology such as the word "pet" is problematic in the context of Rome as work animals and pets were often the same thing in antiquity. Using the word pet also subconsciously projects modern interpretations of what a pet is onto the ancient world. Therefore, it is MacKinnon's suggestion that "personal animal" is a more reflective term for the role of dogs in Roman Britain.

== Economic contributions ==
Roman Britain was lacking in the resources other colonies provided, but hunting dogs found in the Isles were of some value in export and trade. Aside from dogs as companions and for hunting purposes, dog hides were also known attributes of the Roman Britain economy.

== Depictions in art ==
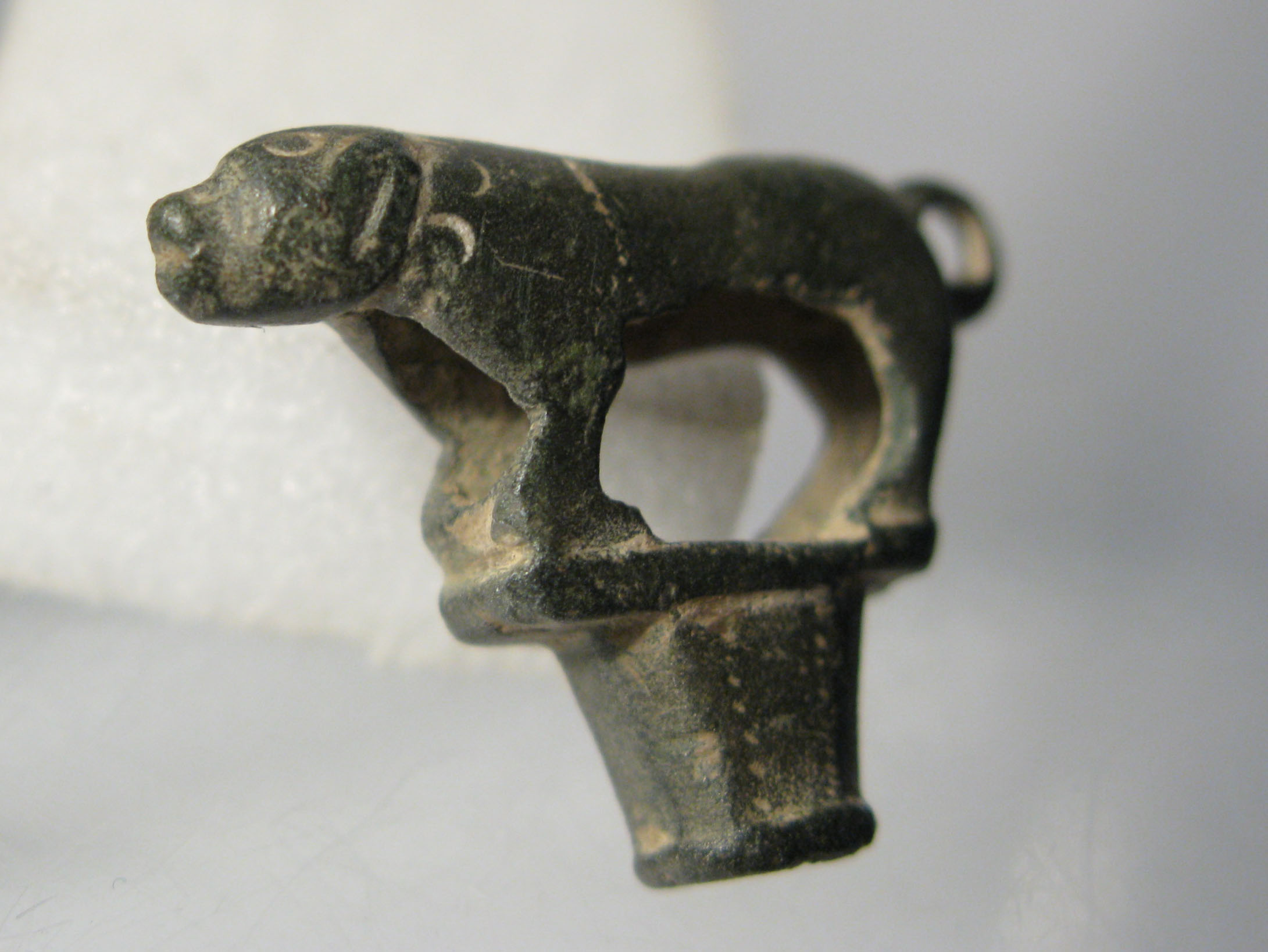
Dog figurines like these were found across Britain

The relationship between Britain and the production of hunting breeds was significant enough to render the image of hunting with domestic dogs often synonymous with the territory itself in Roman art.

Figurines were found in an excavation at Southbroom which consisted of dog-like creatures. Some of them depicted a long protruding tongue while others have a limp human in their jaws. It is suggested that these differences in the figures indicate a transition from a predator to a domesticated animal. However, another important factor to note is that the dog figurines found in this hoard always depict the dog larger than the human. This may be a representation of a deity or divine depiction of the dogs as protectors. This idea can be seen as a visual display of dogs being associated with the underworld.

== See also ==
- Molossus

== Sources ==
- Fleig, D. (1996). Fighting Dog Breeds. (Pg. 26 - 27). Neptune, NJ: TFH Publications. ISBN 0-7938-0499-X
- Homan, M. (1999). A Complete History of Fighting Dogs. (Pg. 9). Howell Book House. ISBN 1-58245-128-1
