= Ziobro =

Ziobro is a Polish surname. Notable people with the surname include:

- Jan Ziobro (ski jumper) (born 1991), Polish ski jumper
- Jan Ziobro (politician) (born 1989), Polish politician
- Zbigniew Ziobro (born 1970), Polish politician
