= Ioannes Paulus =

Ioannes Paulus may refer to:

- Ioannes Paulus II Peninsula, Livingston Island, South Shetland Islands, Antarctica
- Ioannes Paulus Secundus, pope and saint
- Ioannes Paulus PP. I, pope
- Ioannes et Paulus, see John and Paul (disambiguation)

== See also ==
- Ioannes
- John Paul (disambiguation)
- Paulus (disambiguation)
