= Zorba (dog) =

Record-setting dog

Aicama Zorba of La-Susa
- Other name: Zorba
- Species: Canis familiaris
- Breed: Old English Mastiff
- Sex: Male
- Born: 26 September 1981
- Died: 1992 (aged 10–11)
- Title: World's Heaviest Dog; World's Longest Dog
- Owner: Chris Eraclides
- Parents: Stablemate's Bruno of Kisumu (sire); Gildasan Valintine Daisy Of Aicama (dam)
- Weight: 315 lb (143 kg) in 1987; 345 lb (156.5 kg) in 1989
- Height: 37 in (94 cm) in 1989

Aicama Zorba of La-Susa or Zorba (26 September 1981 – 1992) was a male Old English Mastiff who was recognized by Guinness World Records as the heaviest and longest dog in the world.

== World records ==
Zorba did not initially set the record of the heaviest dog in September 1987 at 314 pounds (142 kg).

In November 1989, Zorba was recorded as weighing 330 pounds (149.7 kg). Zorba stood 37 inches (94 cm) at the shoulder and was 8 feet 3 inches (251 cm) from the tip of his nose to the tip of his tail.

== See also ==
- Giant dog breed
- List of individual dogs
