= Pau (given name) =

Pau is the Catalan equivalent of the given name Paul and is also the word for "peace" in that language. Notable people with the name include:

- Pau Alsina (2008–2025), Spanish motorcycle racer
- Pau Audouard (1857–1918), renowned photographer active in Barcelona
- Pablo Casals (1876–1973), known as Pau Casals in Catalan, Catalan cellist
- Pau Cendrós López (born 1987), Spanish football player
- Pau Claris i Casademunt (1586–1641), Catalan lawyer, clergyman and 94th President of Catalonia
- Pau Cubarsí (born 2007) Spanish football defender
- Pau de Bellviure (fourteenth and/or fifteenth centuries), Catalan poet
- Pau Faner Coll (born 1949), Spanish novelist and painter
- Pau Franch (born 1988), Spanish professional football player
- Pau Gasol (born 1980), Spanish basketball player
- Pau Ribas (born 1987), Spanish professional basketball player
- Pau Sabater (1884–1919), Spanish anarcho-syndicalist
- Pau Torres (footballer, born 1987), Spanish football goalkeeper
- Pau Torres (footballer, born 1997), Spanish football defender
- Pau Villalonga (died 1609), Spanish composer

== See also ==
- Pau (disambiguation)
- Joan Pau
