= Paul John =

Paul John may refer to:

- Paul John (rugby union) (born 1970), former Wales international rugby union player
- Paul John (Yupik elder) (1929–2015), American Yup'ik elder, cultural advocate and commercial fisherman
- Paul John (whisky), a brand of Indian single malt and single cask whisky

== See also ==
- Paul Johns (disambiguation)
- John Paul (disambiguation)
- Paul and John (disambiguation)
