= Jean-Paul =

Jean Paul or variation may refer to:

== Places ==
- Rue Jean-Paul-II, several streets, see List of places named after Pope John Paul II
- Place Jean Paul II, several squares, see List of places named after Pope John Paul II

== People ==
=== Given name ===
- Jean-Paul, comte de Schramm (1789–1884), count and war minister of France
- Jean-Paul Afif (born 1980), American-Lebanese basketball player and coach
- Jean-Paul Banos (born 1961), Canadian fencer
- Jean-Paul Behr (born 1947), French chemist
- Jean-Paul Belmondo, (1933–2021), French actor
- Jean-Paul Duminy (born 1984), South African cricketer
- Jean-Paul de Marigny (born 1964), Australian soccer player and coach
- Jean-Paul Emorine (born 1944), French politician
- Jean-Paul Fouchécourt, French tenor
- Jean-Paul Gaster, American musician
- Jean-Paul Gaultier, French fashion designer
- Jean-Paul Lakafia (born 1961), French track and field athlete
- Jean-Paul Marat (1743–1793), French journalist and physician
- Jean-Paul 'Bluey' Maunick, British guitarist and producer
- Jean-Paul Olinger (born 1943), Luxembourgish fencer
- Jean-Paul Samputu, Rwandan singer
- Jean-Paul Sartre (1905–1980), French existentialist philosopher, writer, and political activist
- Jean-Paul Savoie, social worker and former politician in Canada
- Jean-Paul Valley, first Azrael from DC Comics
- Jean-Paul Vonderburg (born 1964), Swedish football player

=== Given name "Jean" and Surname "Paul" ===
- Jean Paul (cricketer) (born 1985), West Indian cricketer

=== Mononym ===
- Jean Paul (1763–1825), German Romantic writer
- Pope John Paul I (1912–1978)
- Pope John Paul II (1920–2005)

=== Surname ===
- Isaac Jean-Paul (born 1993), U.S. paralympic track athlete

== See also ==
- John Paul (given name)
- Juan Pablo, the Spanish language equivalent
- Joan Pau, the Catalan language equivalent
- Jean (male given name)
- Paul (name)
- Jean (disambiguation)
- Paul (disambiguation)
- John Paul (disambiguation)
