= Henry Constantine Jennings =

English antiquarian, collector and gambler

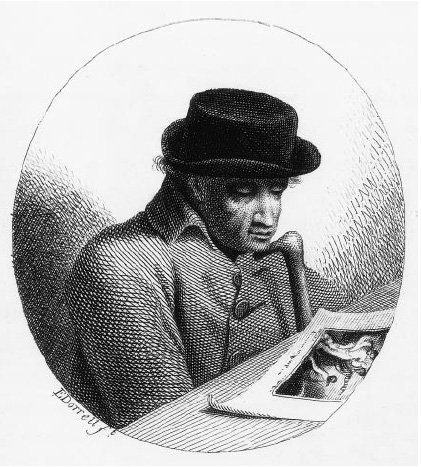
Jennings, by E. Dorrell

Henry Constantine Jennings (August 1731 – 17 February 1819) was an antiquarian, collector and gambler, best known for the Roman sculpture – known as The Jennings Dog – which he acquired and which is now in the British Museum. He was known as "Dog Jennings" after it. He attended Westminster School and is buried at St Margaret's, Westminster.

== Life ==
The only son of James Jennings, he was born at his father's estate at Shiplake in Oxfordshire. He was educated at Westminster School, and at the age of seventeen became an ensign in the 1st Foot Guards. Resigning his commission soon after, he went abroad. He spent eight years in Italy (three of them in Rome), and subsequently visited Sicily. In Italy he became acquainted with the Marquess of Blandford, and is said to have suggested to him the formation of the cabinet of "Marlborough Gems".

While in Rome Jennings purchased antiquities from Bartolomeo Cavaceppi, the sculptor and art-dealer. In a back street in the city he discovered in workshop rubbish the marble "Jennings Dog", and purchased it. It was sold by Jennings at Christie's, on 4 April 1778 for one thousand guineas, to Charles Duncombe.

On his return to England (perhaps about 1756) Jennings passed a country-gentleman's life on his estate at Shiplake. Taking to horse-racing, he lost money heavily, and in 1778 sold his collections and the famous dog. In 1777–8 he was a prisoner in the King's Bench Prison, where he made the acquaintance of John Horne Tooke. Soon after he settled in Essex and collected objects of vertu. He was later a prisoner for debt in Chelmsford gaol. He had borrowed and not repaid £1,600 from Chase Price, receiver-general of South Wales, who died indebted to the crown, and an "extent in aid" was issued by the crown against Jennings. He was forced to sell his new collections at a loss.

About 1792 Jennings came to London, where he resided in the first house on the east side of Lindsey Row, Chelsea. Here he amused himself with writing and with forming a new collection until about 1816. His health failing and with money troubles, his collections remained unsold, and he is said to have had an income from West Indian property. He died, aged 88, on 17 February 1819, at his lodgings in Belvidere Place, St George's Fields, within the rules of the King's Bench. In his later years he took the name of Noel (or Nowell) on receiving a legacy; his old friend Joseph Nollekens called him "Nowell Jennings". At the time of his death he had before the House of Lords a claim for a barony in abeyance. He was eccentric in his habits, and was believed by his friends to keep an oven in his house for the cremation of his body.

== Collections ==
The collection formed by Jennings while in Chelsea comprised (according to Thomas Faulkner in his History of Chelsea) series of shells, as well as minerals, precious stones, intaglios, stuffed birds, prints, books, portraits, gold and silver medals or coins. The shells and the most valuable objects were sold by auction by Phillips in Bond Street, London, in 1820, the birds and the remaining specimens being sold, with the furniture, at Lindsey Row.

== Works ==
Among Jennings's publications were:

- A Free Enquiry into the Enormous Increase of Attornies, 1785,

and the following, all published in 1798, but without date:

- Cursory Remarks on Infancy and Education.
- Observations on the Advantages attending an Elevated and Dry Situation.
- A Physical Enquiry into the Powers and Properties of Spirit.
- Thoughts on the Rise and Decline of the Polite Arts.

== Family ==
Jennings married, first, about 1760, Juliana Atkinson, who died in 1761, and by whom he had a son, John Henry; secondly, in 1777, Elizabeth Katherine, a daughter of Roger Nowell of Bobins Place, Kent.
