= Zaara =

Archaic variant of Sahara

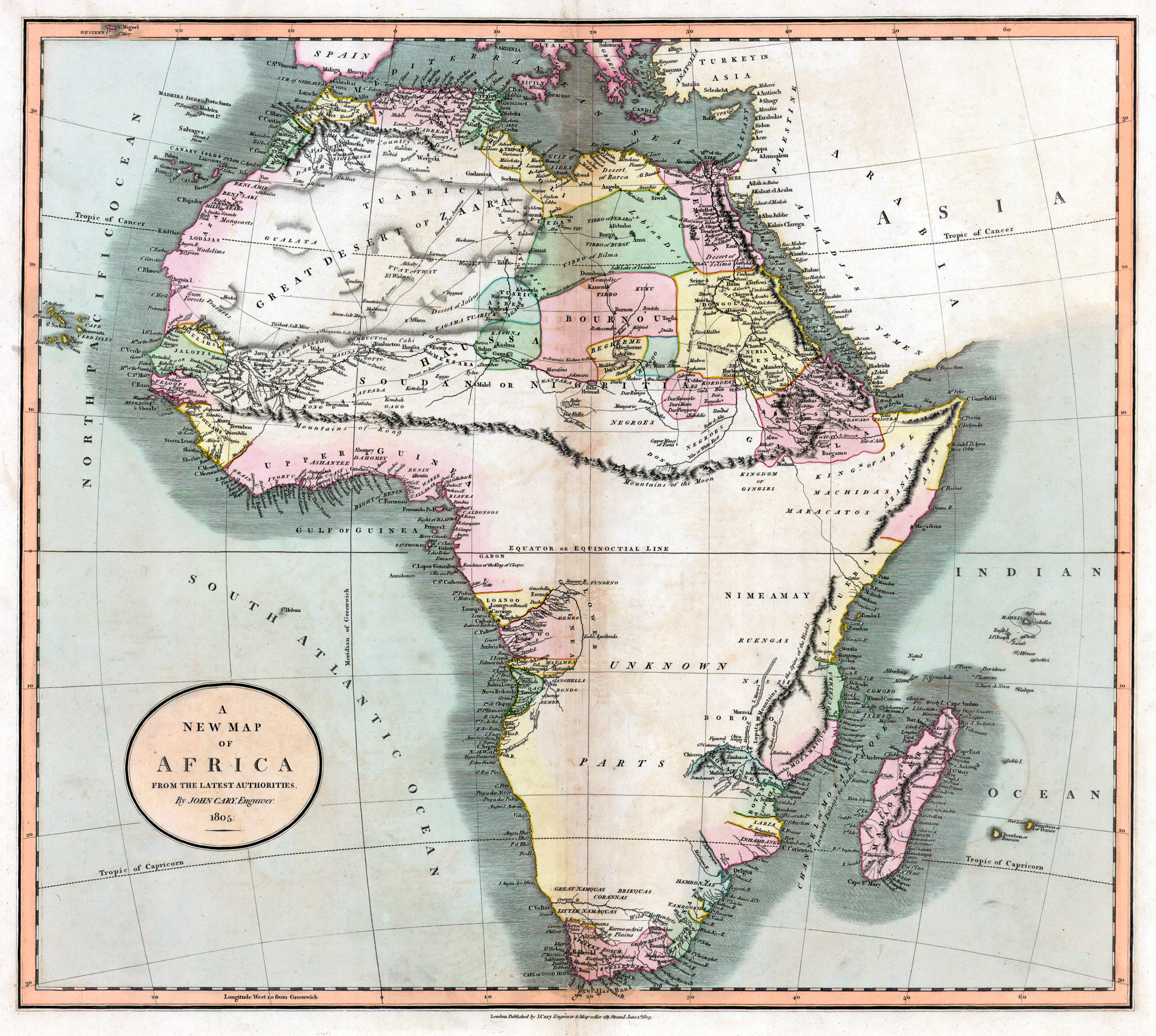
The "Great Desert of Zaara" is shown on this 1805 map of Africa.

Zaara is an archaic variant of Sahara, both being English transliterations of the original Arabic word for desert. It is an African region famed for its arid, barren characteristics, and was used by contemporary writers not just as a geographic reference, but also to illustrate the epitome of a dismal wasteland. Modern references to the Sahara as Zaara are very sparse. It generally cannot be found in online dictionaries or encyclopedias, not even as a footnote under the standard spelling. However, a few references can be found in antique books, particularly those regarding the animals of the region and travelogues; and on antique maps, some as recent as 1834.

== Literary references ==
From the chapter on lions in William Smellie's 1781 English translation of Buffon's Histoire Naturelle:

The lions of Mount Atlas, the summit of which is sometimes covered with snow, have neither the courage, the strength, nor the ferocity of the lions of Biledulgerid or of Zaara, whose plains are covered with burning sands. It is chiefly in these fervid deserts that we meet with those terrible lions, who are the dread of travellers, and the scourge of the neighbouring provinces.

In the vast deserts of Zaara, in those that seem to separate two very different races of men, the Negroes and the Moors, in the unpeopled regions that lie about the territories of the Hottentos, and, in general, in all those southern parts of Africa and Asia, which man has disdained to inhabit, the lions are still very numerous, and continue in their natural state.

This is a description of the English Mastiff from the Cynographia Britannica, published in 1800. The reference to attacking "the lord of the savage tribes" means the breed's use as lion-hunters. At the time this was written, lions were commonly referred to as the "king of the beasts":

This ancient and faithful domestic, the pride of our island, uniting the useful, the brave and the docile, though sought by foreign nations and perpetuated on the continent, is nearly extinct where he probably was an aborigine, or is bastardized by numberless crosses, everyone of which degenerate from the invaluable character of the parent, who was deemed worthy to enter the Roman amphitheatre, and, in the presence of the masters of the worlds, encounter the pard, and assail even the lord of the savage tribes, whose courage was sublimed by torrid suns, and found none gallant enough to oppose him on the deserts of Zaara or the plains of Numidia.

This is an early 19th-century complaint about a 1788 American law that made it easier to market fraudulent land grants. It cites the poor quality of Zaara's land as an example of deceptive marketing. This commentary appears in Blackstone's Commentaries: with Notes of Reference, annotated by St. George Tucker of the College of William and Mary and published in 1803:

The evil has not rested here; emissaries have been dispatched to every part of Europe with bales of these patents; fictitious plats, and maps of the country, have been offered to the public's eye; rivers and streams have been made to flow where nature has denied water; mountains have been sunk into meadows, and rocks as barren as the sandy deserts of Zaara, have been represented as possessing the fertility of the banks of the Nile. Thousands of ignorant and innocent persons have been defrauded, and, with their families, plunged into irretrievable ruin by these nefarious practices.

The Narrative of a Voyage to Senegal in 1816 by Corréard and Savigny, carries this lengthy subtitle:

Undertaken by Order of the French Government, Comprising an Account of the Shipwreck of the Medusa, the Sufferings of the Crew, and the Various Occurrences on Board the Raft, in the Desert of Zaara, at St. Louis, and at the Camp of Daccard. To Which Are Subjoined Observations Respecting the Agriculture of the Western Coast of Africa, from Cape Blanco to the Mouth of the Gambia.

== See also ==
- Sahara
