= John and Paul (disambiguation) =

John and Paul were Christians martyred in Rome c. AD 362.

John and Paul or Paul and John may also refer to:

- Paul the Apostle and John the Apostle in the New Testament
- John Lennon and Paul McCartney of the Beatles
  - Lennon–McCartney, their songwriting partnership
- Santi Giovanni e Paolo (disambiguation), several uses

== See also ==
- John (disambiguation)
- Paul (disambiguation)
- John Paul (disambiguation)
- Paul John (disambiguation)
- Brothers Paul Nash (artist) (1889–1946) and John Nash (artist) (1893–1977)
- Brothers John Horvat and Paul Horvat, in 1390s Hungary–Croatia
