= Jennings Dog =

Roman sculpture of a dog

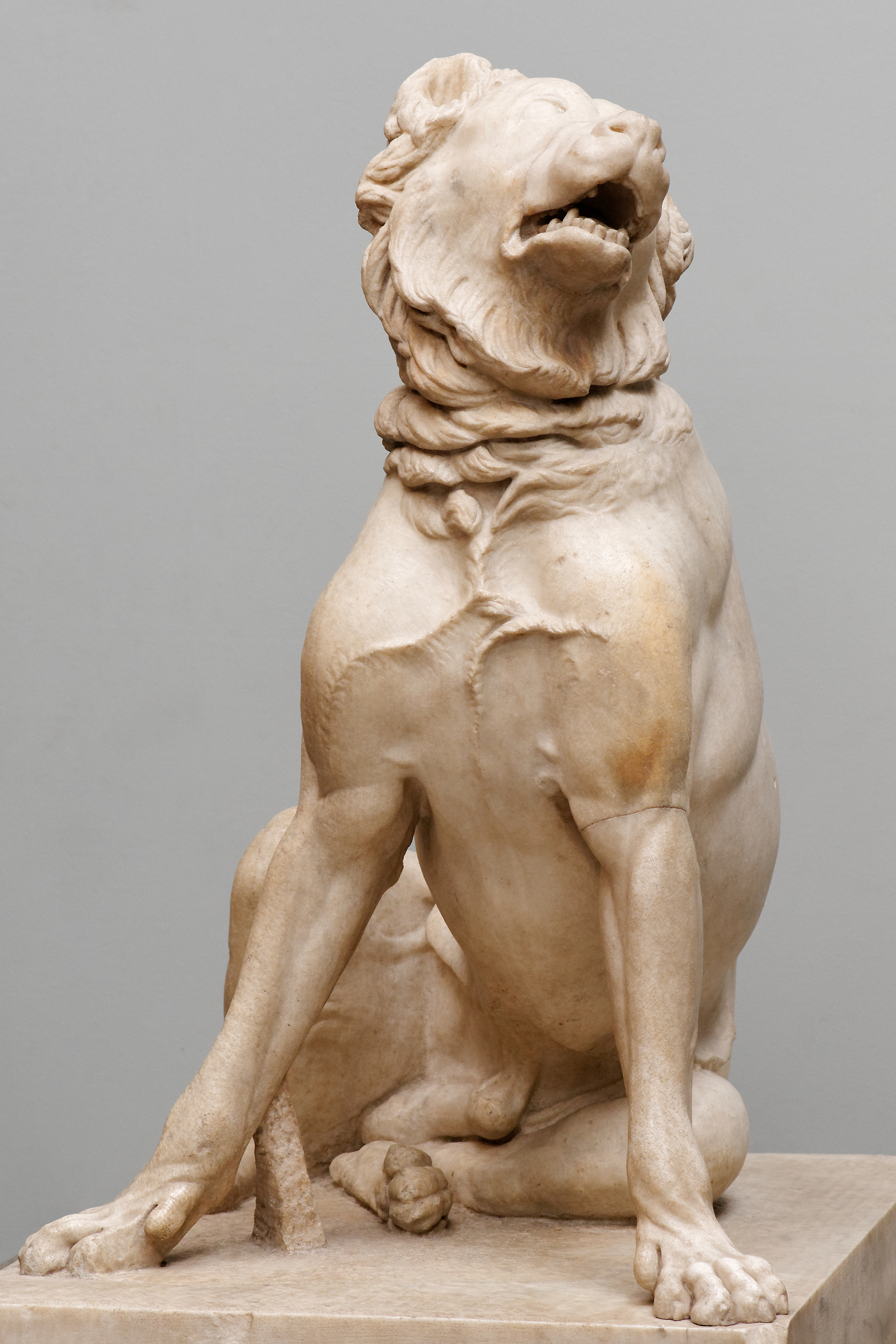
- The Jennings Dog on display in the British Museum
- Material: Marble
- Discovered: 1753–1756; Monte Cagnuolo
- Discovered by: Henry Constantine Jennings
- Present location: British Museum
- 3D model (click to interact)

The Jennings Dog (also known as the Duncombe Dog or Dog of Alcibiades) is a Roman sculpture of a dog with a docked tail. It is a second-century AD Roman copy of a Hellenistic bronze original, probably of the second century BC, and is named for its first modern owner, Henry Constantine Jennings. It is 1.05 metres (3 ft 5 in) high; its leonine muzzle and one leg have been repaired since its rediscovery. Though it is one of only a few animal sculptures surviving from antiquity, a pair of similar marble mastiffs of the same model can be seen in the Belvedere Court of the Vatican Museums.

== Molossian dog ==
It is identified at the British Museum as a Molossian guard dog. The Molossian breed was native to Epirus in northwestern Greece, which was sacked by Rome in 168 BC, so it is assumed to have been associated with some civic monument in Epirus and to have been brought to Rome. Pliny mentions a highly valued bronze dog surviving in Rome into his lifetime, before being lost in AD 69:

... our own generation saw on the Capitol, before it went up in flames burnt at the hands of the adherents of Vitellius, in the shrine of Juno, a bronze figure of a hound licking its wound, the miraculous excellence and absolute truth to life of which is shown not only by the fact of its dedication in that place but also by the method taken for insuring it; for as no sum of money seemed to equal its value, the government enacted that its custodians should be answerable for its safety with their lives.

== Discovery and purchase ==
The stone sculpture was discovered at Monte Cagnuolo, near the ancient Lanuvium, the site of an imperial villa of Antoninus Pius, 32 km southeast of Rome, where it was probably made; its first modern owner was the sculptor, restorer, and dealer in antiquities Bartolomeo Cavaceppi. Henry Constantine Jennings saw it in a pile of rubble in Cavaceppi's workshop in Rome between 1753 and 1756, bought it from him for 400 scudi, and took it back to Britain.

The sculpture became famous on its arrival in Britain, praised by Horace Walpole among a scant handful of masterly Roman sculptures of animals, with replicas that were thought to make "a most noble appearance in a gentleman's hall", in Dr Johnson's words.

== "The Dog of Alcibiades" ==
A story in Plutarch's life of Alcibiades tells of the statesman owning a large, handsome dog whose tail Alcibiades cut off so as to invoke pity from the Athenians and distract them from his worse deeds. The broken tail of this sculpture led Jennings to link it to this story, calling it "the dog of Alcibiades"; under this title a pair of copies in Portland stone were installed by Robert Adam at Newby Hall, Yorkshire, about 1780, and in the later nineteenth century, a pair in cast stone were set in the gardens at Basildon Park, Berkshire. A nineteenth-century pair carved in serpentine were sold by Bonhams in London in 2005.

== "Duncombe's Dog" ==
In settlement of his gambling debts in 1778, Jennings was forced to sell the sculpture, stating, "A fine dog it was, and a lucky dog was I to purchase it". The dog was soon afterwards sold at Phillips for £1000 to the Rt Hon Charles Duncombe. James Boswell records a conversation between Johnson and other members of the Literary Club, at about the time of the sale of the statue, in which Edmund Burke exclaimed, "A thousand guineas! The representation of no animal whatever is worth so much", to which Dr Johnson replied, "Sir, it is not the worth of the thing, but the skill in forming it, which is so highly estimated. Every thing that enlarges the sphere of human powers, that shews man he can do what he thought he could not do, is valuable".

For 150 years, the sculpture stood guard in the entrance hall of Duncombe Park, the family mansion in Yorkshire; it was enthusiastically described there in 1859: "Among the statues in this apartment is particularly noticed an excellent antique sculpture, representing the Dog of Alcibiades, said to be the work of Myron, a Grecian sculptor". It remained there, away from public view, until 1925. In that year, inheritance taxes forced the Duncombes to rent out the hall to Queen Mary's School for Girls, whose pupils were rumoured to feed the dog unwanted Marmite sandwiches.

== The British Museum ==
It was finally sold by Thomas Duncombe's descendant Charles Anthony Peter Duncombe, 6th Baron Feversham, in 2001. The Sarah Campbell Blaffer Foundation at the Museum of Fine Arts, Houston, had attempted to purchase it (the sculpture had been shown in the United States in the 1980s), at the price of $950,000, but the granting of an export licence was deferred by the British government. The Heritage Lottery Fund, National Art Collections Fund, British Museum Friends, Duthie Fund, Ready Bequest, Caryatid Fund, Mrs Barbara G. Fleischman, Mr Frank A. Ladd and the Ready Bequest had already pledged funds to help "save it for the nation". With the sculpture on temporary display in its Great Court, the delay on the export allowed the British Museum enough time to raise the remaining £662,297 through a public appeal, and thus to acquire it permanently. It is on permanent display in gallery 22 of the Museum, B. 2001.1010.1.
