= Persistent pupillary membrane =

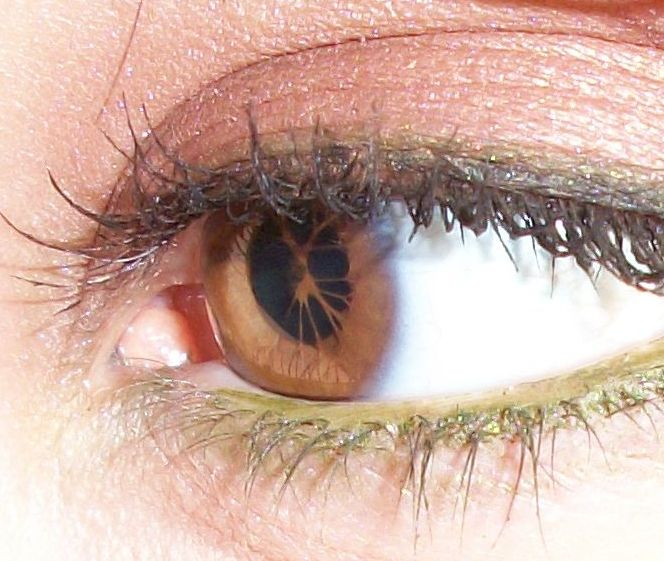
- Human eye with persistent pupillary membrane
- Specialty: Ophthalmology

Persistent pupillary membrane (PPM) is a condition of the eye involving remnants of a fetal membrane that persist as strands of tissue crossing the pupil. The pupillary membrane in mammals exists in the fetus as a source of blood supply for the lens. It normally atrophies from the time of birth to the age of four to eight weeks. PPM occurs when this atrophy is incomplete. It generally does not cause any symptoms. The strands can connect to the cornea or lens, but most commonly to other parts of the iris. Attachment to the cornea can cause small corneal opacities, while attachment to the lens can cause small cataracts. Using topical atropine to dilate the pupil may help break down PPMs.

In dogs, PPM is inherited in the Basenji but can occur in other breeds such as the Pembroke Welsh Corgi, Chow Chow, Mastiff, and English Cocker Spaniel. It can also be observed in cats, horses, and cattle.
