= Giovanni Paolo =

Giovanni Paolo may refer to:

- Giovanni di Paolo (1403–1482) Italian painter
- Pope John Paul I (Giovanni Paolo I), pope
- Giovanni Paolo II (Giovanni Paolo II), pope and saint
- Giovanni Paolo I Sforza (1497–1535) Italian condottiero
- Piazza Giovanni Paolo II, several squares, see List of places named after Pope John Paul II
- Via Giovanni Paolo II, several roads, see List of places named after Pope John Paul II

== See also ==
- Santi Giovanni e Paolo (disambiguation)
- Giovanni (disambiguation)
- Paolo (disambiguation)
- John Paul (disambiguation)
