= Giampaoli =

Giampaoli is a surname. Notable people with the surname include:

- Renzo Giampaoli (born 2000), Argentine professional footballer
- Christine Giampaoli Zonca (born 1993), Italian rally and off-road race driver

== See also ==
- Giampaolo
