= Pammelia =

1609 music collection by Thomas Ravenscroft

Pammelia is an English collection of vocal rounds and canons, first published in England by Thomas Ravenscroft in 1609. It was the first collection of its type, and was followed by Deuteromelia, which was also published in 1609. It consists of 100 anonymous pieces for three to ten voices. A second edition was printed in 1618.
