= John Paul (medical scientist) =

Biomedical research scientist

- Born: 25 April 1922; Wishaw, Scotland
- Died: 27 June 1994 (aged 72)
- Citizenship: United Kingdom
- Education: University of Glasgow
- Known for: research on cell biology, tissue culture and cancer
- Scientific career
- Fields: Biology; Medicine; Cell biology
- Workplaces: University of Glasgow; Royal Beatson Memorial Hospital; Beatson Institute for Cancer Research

John Paul (25 April 1922 – 27 June 1994) was a biomedical research scientist living in Scotland, UK. He was the founding director of the Beatson Institute for Cancer Research in Glasgow, Scotland.

He wrote five books on the subject of cell biology, tissue culture and cancer, including Cell Biology: A Current Summary and Cell and Tissue Culture.

In 1961 he invented and patented an apparatus for cell and tissue culture. In 1966, he, along with Robert Edwards, derived the world’s first embryonic stem cells.

== Early life and education ==
Paul was born on 25 April 1922 in Wishaw, Lanarkshire, Scotland. He graduated from the University of Glasgow with an MB ChB in 1944, then completed a PhD in biochemistry. He was the Ure scholar at Glasgow University in 1948–51 and the McCunn scholar at the University of Edinburgh, followed by a research fellowship (Rockefeller travelling research fellowship) at the Columbia University College of Physicians and Surgeons in New York in 1952–53.

== Career ==
He was director of the Tissue Culture Laboratories of the Department of Biochemistry in the University of Glasgow and became a reader in 1962 and a Titular Professor in 1964. He left Glasgow University in 1966 to become Director of the Cancer Research Laboratories of the Royal Beatson Memorial Hospital in Glasgow.

He retired in 1987 and died 27 June 1994.

== Awards and honours ==
Paul was awarded an honorary DSc by the University of Glasgow in 1989.

There is a John Paul Career Award named after him, for which third year PhD students at the Scotland Institute are eligible .
