= John Paul (footballer) =

Scottish footballer

Personal information
- Full name: John Edward Paul
- Date of birth: 1873
- Place of birth: Glasgow, Scotland
- Positions: Outside forward; inside forward

Senior career*
Years	Team	Apps	(Gls)
- Hibernian
1894–1897	Derby County	28	(9)
1899–1901	Bristol Rovers	51	(13)
- * Club domestic league appearances and goals

John Edward Paul (born 3 August 1873 in Glasgow, Scotland) was a footballer who played in the late 19th and early twentieth centuries. He played in Scotland for Hibernian, before heading south of the border to play for Derby County in the English Football League. He played 28 League games for Derby, both as an inside forward and an outside forward, and a further 51 Southern League matches for Bristol Rovers between 1899 and 1901.

He took part in Bristol Rovers' biggest ever win, when he played outside-left in a 15–1 victory over Weymouth in the fourth qualifying round of the FA Cup on 17 November 1900. He scored one of Rovers' goals, but was the only member of the front line to fail to score more than once. Inside-right Jack Jones scored six times in that game, a record for a Bristol Rovers player.

== Personal life ==
Paul was born in Glasgow in 1873, the son of Simon Paul and Ellen Smith. He married his wife Mary Elizabeth "May" Derbyshire in Bakewell in 1897, and at the time of the 1901 census they had one daughter, Dorothy. Two more daughters, Freda and Edith, had arrived by the time of the 1911 census.
