= Galton (disambiguation) =

Francis Galton (1822–1911) was an English Victorian polymath.

Galton may also refer to:

- Galton (name), includes a list of people with the name
- Galton Bridge, West Midlands, England
- Galton Institute
- Galton Junction, railway junction in England
- Galton Laboratory at University College, London
- Galton Village, West Midlands, England
- Galton–Watson process in probability theory
