= Santi Giovanni e Paolo =

Santi Giovanni e Paolo (Italian, 'John and Paul') may refer to:

- Santi Giovanni e Paolo al Celio, an ancient basilica church in Rome, Italy
- Santi Giovanni e Paolo, Venice, or San Zanipolo, a church in Venice, Italy
- Teatro Santi Giovanni e Paolo, a theater and opera house in Venice, Italy, 1638–1715
- Ferentino Cathedral (Basilica Cattedrale dei Santi Giovanni e Paolo), in Ferentino, Lazio, Italy

== See also ==
- John and Paul (disambiguation)
