= Nicolas Gistou =

Flemish musician and composer

Nicolas Gistou sometimes Nicolas Gistow or Nicolò Gistou (died 19 July 1609) was a Flemish countertenor musician and composer at the court of Christian IV of Denmark. He was born in Brussels and died in Copenhagen, aged about 50.

== Works, editions and recordings ==
- Giardino novo belissimo, secondo libro, 1606
- Quel Augellin che canta (prima parte) / Ma ben arde nel core (seconda parte) – from Giardino novo belissimo, secondo libro, 1606. The Consort of Musicke
