= Juan Pablo =

Juan Pablo is a common combination of Spanish given names. It is the equivalent of "John Paul" in English or "Jean-Paul" in French. Notable people with the name include:

- Juan Pablo Ángel (born 1975), Colombian football player
- Juan Pablo Arenas (born 1987) is a Chilean football player
- Juan Pablo Belatti (born 1979), Argentine football assistant referee
- Juan Pablo Bennett (1871–1951), Chilean dictator
- Juan Pablo Bonet, 17th-century Spanish priest and educator
- Juan Pablo Brzezicki (born 1982) is a professional tennis player from Buenos Aires, Argentina.
- Juan Pablo Caffa (born 1984), Argentine football player
- Juan Pablo Cárdenas Squella (born 1949), Chilean journalist
- Juan Pablo Carrizo (born 1984), Argentine football player
- Juan Pablo Colinas (born 1978), better known as simply Juan Pablo, Spanish football player
- Juan Pablo Di Pace (born 1979), Argentine model
- Juan Pablo Duarte, 19th century visionary and liberal thinker
- Juan Pablo Forero (born 1983), Colombian track and road cyclist
- Juan Pablo Francia (born 1984), Argentine football player
- Juan Pablo Galavis (born 1981), Venezuelan football player
- Juan Pablo García (born 1981), Mexican football player
- Juan Pablo Hourquebie (born 1976), Argentine hockey player
- Juan Pablo Montoya (born 1975), race car driver
- Juan Pablo Raies, Argentine rally driver
- Juan Pablo Rodríguez (born 1979), Mexican football player
- Juan Pablo Santiago (born 1980), Mexican football player
- Juan Pablo Sorín (born 1976), Argentine football player
- Juan Pablo Vizcardo y Guzmán (1748-1798), Peruvian writer and precursor of Latin American independence
- Juan Pablo Vargas (born 1995), Costa Rican football player
- Juan Pablo Domínguez (born 1998), Mexican football player
- Juan Pablo Vojvoda (born 1975), Argentine football manager and former player
- Juan Pablo Goicochea (born 2005), Peruvian football player
- Juan Pablo Vigón (born 1991), Mexican football player

== See also ==
- Juan Pablo II (disambiguation)
