= John Paul (artist) =

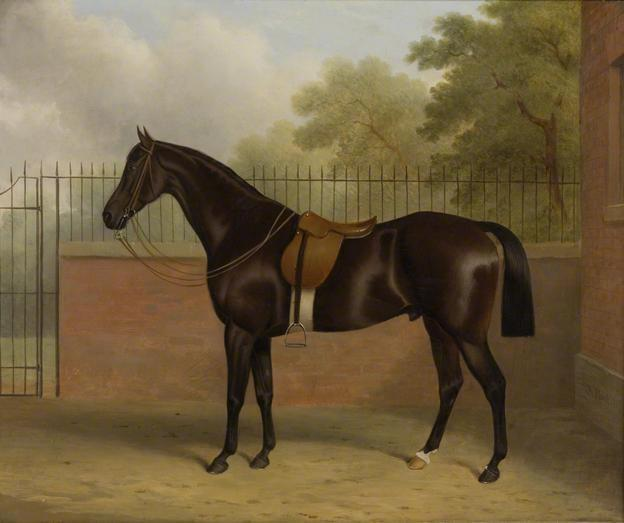
Painting by John Paul portraying a bay stallion

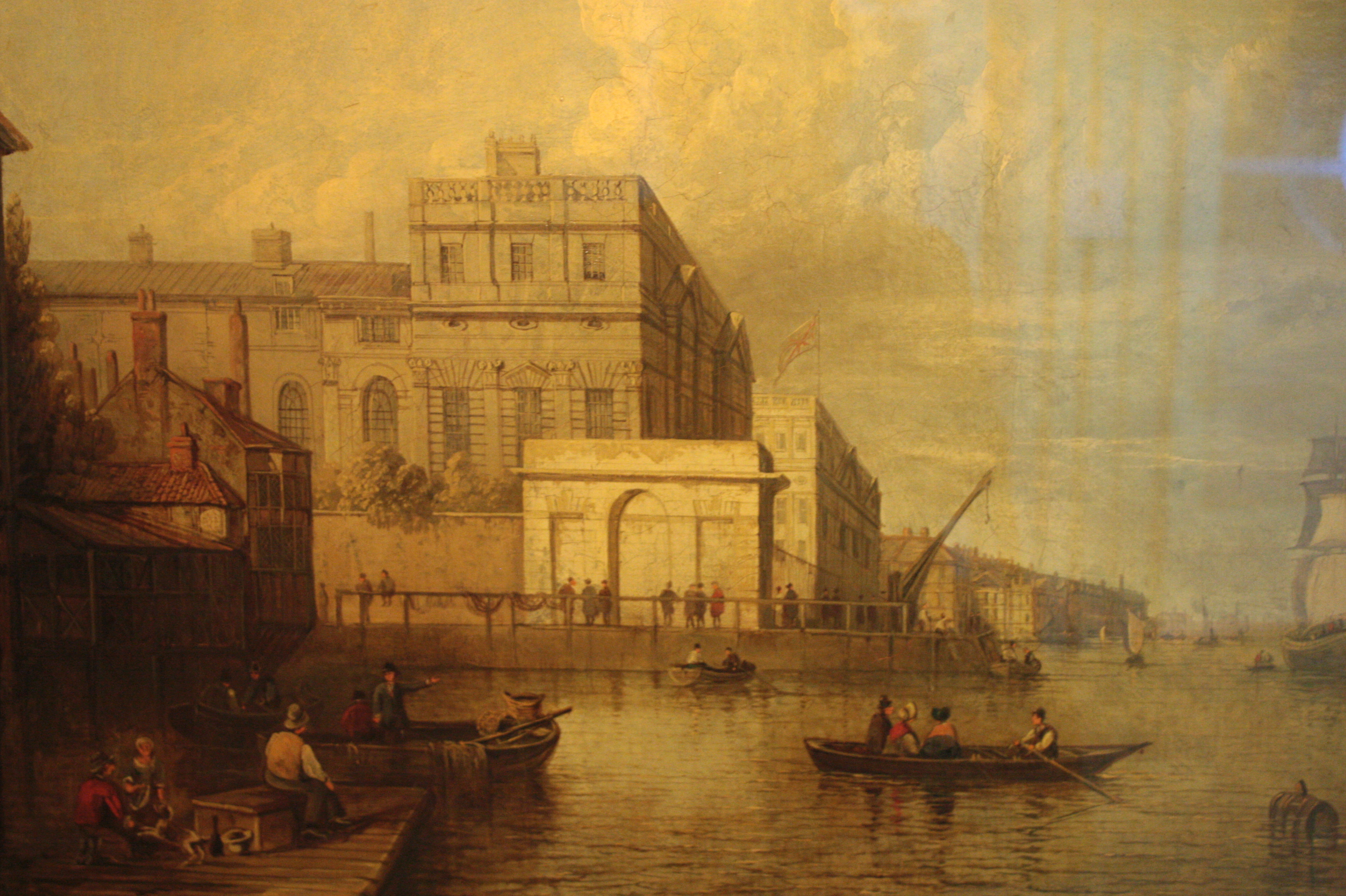
Greenwich Hospital by John Paul, 1835

John Paul (1804–1887) was an English painter.

== Biography ==
Little is known of Paul's personal life. other than it bridged the Georgian Era and the Victorian Era.

== Work ==
Paul was known for painting views of London in which the figures were dressed in the manner of the 1700s, the previous century. The City of London Corporation owns a painting attributed to him of Smithfield Market. It is housed in The Guildhall Art Gallery.

Examples of Paul's equine and canine paintings are the illustrated Bay Stallion and the 1867 work Four Dogs, which depicts a Mastiff, two Greyhounds and a Bull Terrier.

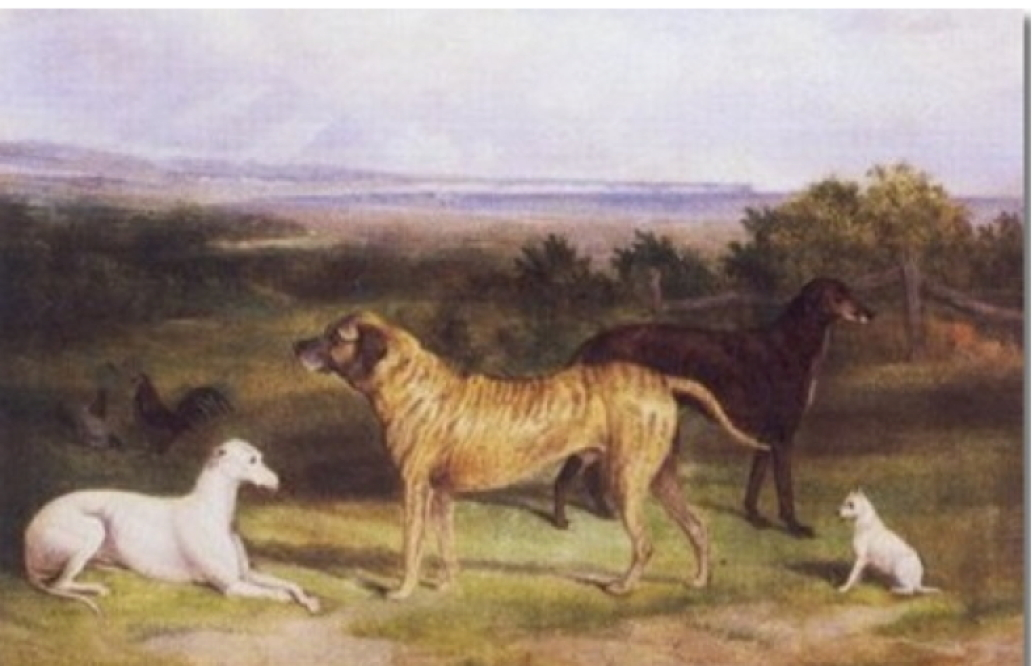
Oil painting of a Mastiff, two Greyhounds, and a Bull Terrier by John Paul (1867)
