= Giacomo Finetti =

Italian priest and composer

Giacomo Finetti (died 1630) was an Italian Anconitan priest and composer. He was Maestro di cappella in the gran Casa of Venice.

== Collections and scores ==
- Concerti Ecclesiastici (1621), Janet E. Hunt (ed.) ISBN 978-0-9962221-1-2.
