= Pau Villalonga =

Spanish composer

Pau Villalonga (died Palma de Mallorca 29 March 1609) was a Spanish composer of sacred polyphony.

== Life ==
He was chapel master of the church of Santa Maria del Mar (Barcelona) until 1564; then he became the first chapel master of the cathedral of Palma de Mallorca, appointment which he held until his death in 1609. According to the cathedral's records, he was "primatxer" or main singer of the cathedral's choir. The same documents show that among his duties he had to compose and teach music, as well as oversee the general education of the choir boys. His total extant musical output is compiled in the so-called Llibre d'Atril or Choir Book, which is now kept at the Arxiu Capitular de Mallorca. The small size of the handwritten volume and the fact that sometimes a third voice is copied in the back of several folios seem to indicate that the manuscript was not an actual choir book, but rather a compilation of the composer's music. The first page of the book reads "Es de m[estre] Pau Villa Llonga" (Is by m[aster] Pau Villa Llonga), a phrasing that indicates that the book belonged to and was by the composer. Besides all of the known works by Villalonga, the Llibre d'atril includes unidentified works possibly by other composers (although most of the folios are unreadable). Villalonga's compositions have received high appraisal from Felipe Pedrell—comparing them to those of Victoria and Palestrina—Georges Jean-Aubry, and Manuel de Falla.

Work list (polyphonic settings, four voices):

Ad coronam, Ave Regina, Ave Maria stella Ave Regina caelorum Exultant laudibus, Himnum in festo S. Michaelis et Cor Christi, Jesu corona virginum, 3 Magnificats, Pange lingua, Salve Regina, Salve sancta parens, Sanctorum meritis, Veni creator, Vexilla regis
