= Molossian hound =

Molossus
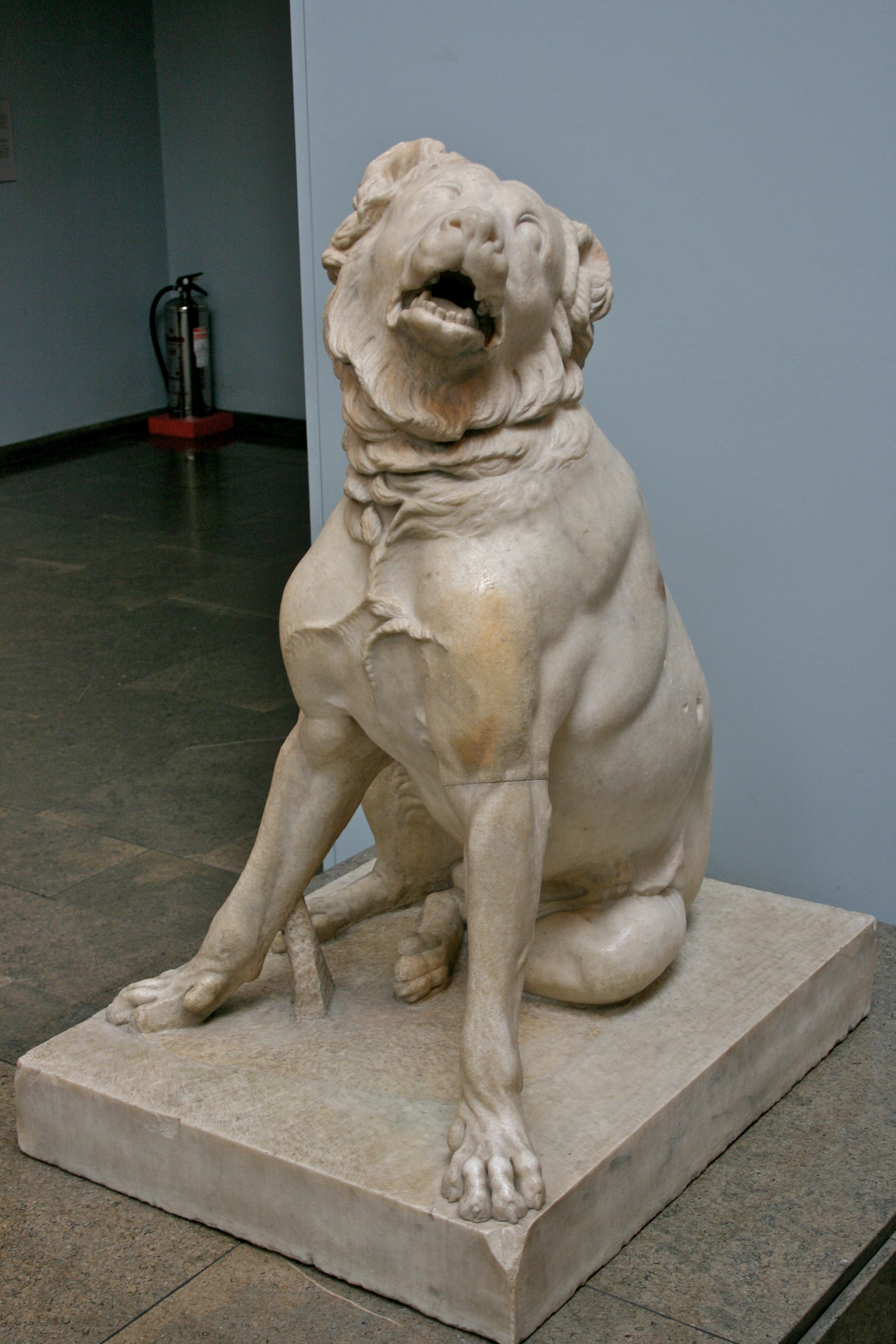
- The "Jennings Dog", a Roman copy of a lost Greek bronze statue, on display in the British Museum
- Other names: Μολοσσός; Molossian hound
- Origin: Epirus, ancient Greece
- Breed status: Extinct

The Molossus (Greek: Μολοσσός, romanized: Molossós), also known as the Molossian hound and Epirus mollosus, is an extinct dog breed from Ancient Greece.

== History ==
Molossus dogs were kept by the ancient Greek tribe and kingdom of the Molossians, who inhabited the region of Epirus.

They were famous throughout the ancient world for their size and ferocity and were frequently mentioned in ancient literature, including the writings of Aristophanes, Aristotle, Grattius, Horace, Lucan, Lucretius, Martial, Nemesianus, Oppian of Apamea, Plautus, Seneca, Statius, and Virgil. The Molossians issued silver coinage with an image of a Molossus as their emblem.

Some books and magazines, particularly in Continental Europe and North America, state that all mastiff-type dogs are descended from the Molossus. This theory states that the breed's progenitors arrived in Molossia from Asia and were eventually discovered by the Romans, who employed large numbers as guards for the Roman Army. This theory speculates that the various mastiff breeds found throughout Europe descend from dogs left behind by the Romans, but it has been questioned by many experts, who state it relies on guesswork and lacks historical evidence, and that mastiffs likely developed elsewhere.

Another story is that in the course of his military conquests, Alexander the Great discovered some giant dogs in Asia that impressed him so much that he sent some home; as the son of a Molossian princess, these dogs became associated with his mother's people and that all mastiffs descend from these dogs.

The Molossians most likely kept two distinct types of dogs, one a hunting dog with a broad muzzle that resembled something between a Great Dane and a heavily built Saluki, the other a large livestock guardian dog. Aristotle in his History of Animals wrote, "In the Molossian race of dogs, those employed in hunting differ in no respect from other dogs; while those employed in following sheep are larger and more fierce in their attack on wild beasts." He also added that dogs that are born of a mixed breed between the Molossian and the Laconian dogs are remarkable for courage and endurance of hard labour.

Polycrates of Samos imported Molossian and Laconian dogs to the island.

According to Greek mythology, the goddess Artemis gave to Procris a dog, Laelaps, that never failed to catch its prey, and from this dog derived the Molossian and Laconian hounds.

== Modern kennel club classification ==
A number of modern kennel clubs, including the Fédération Cynologique Internationale, group the distinct mastiffs with livestock guardian dogs as a single type they call "molossoid". This confusion has been theorised to be due to mistranslations of ancient texts and assumptions based solely on size.

== See also ==
- List of dog breeds
- List of extinct dog breeds
- Molossus of Epirus
