= Giant dog breed =

Dog breed of very large proportions

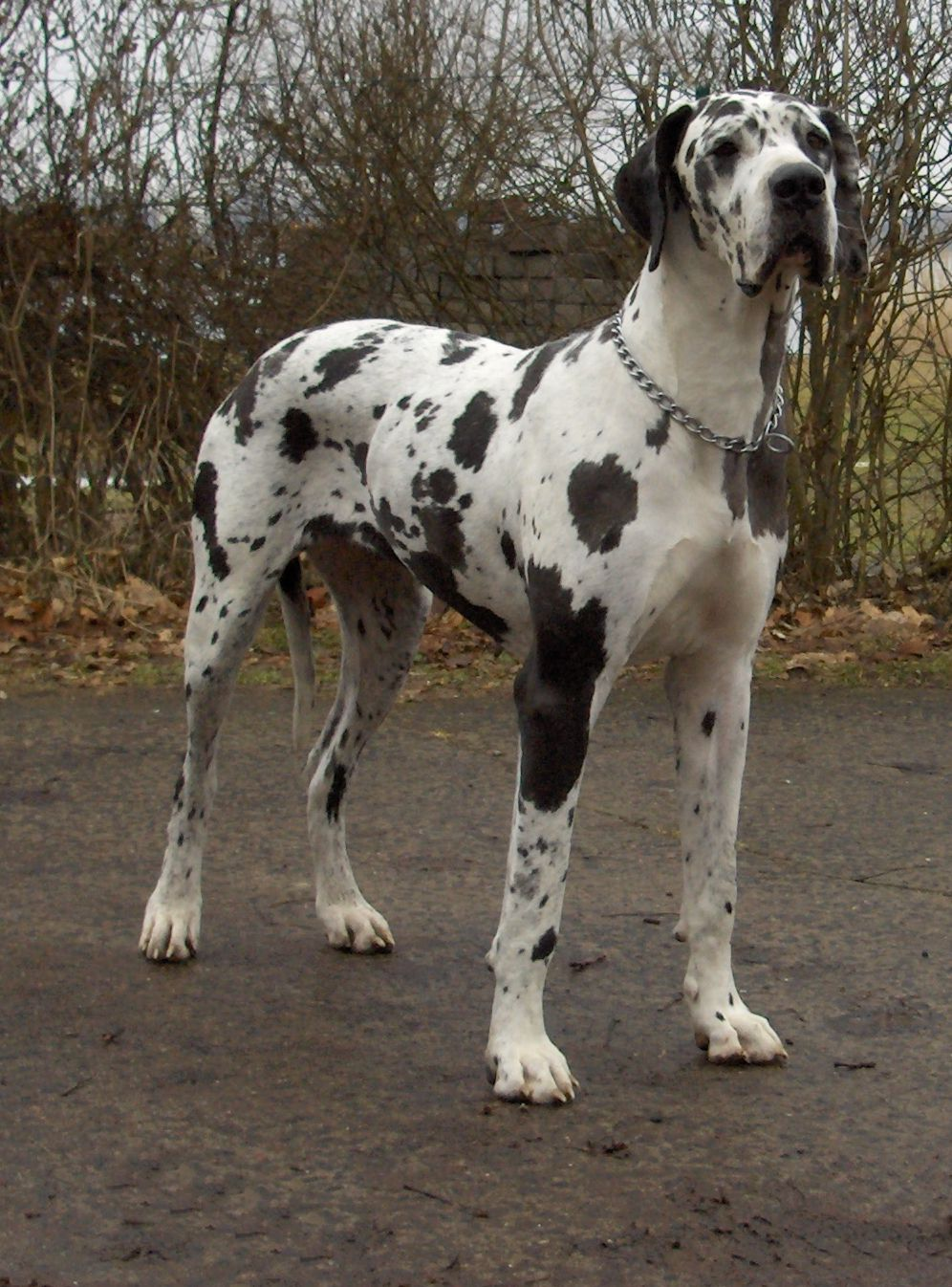
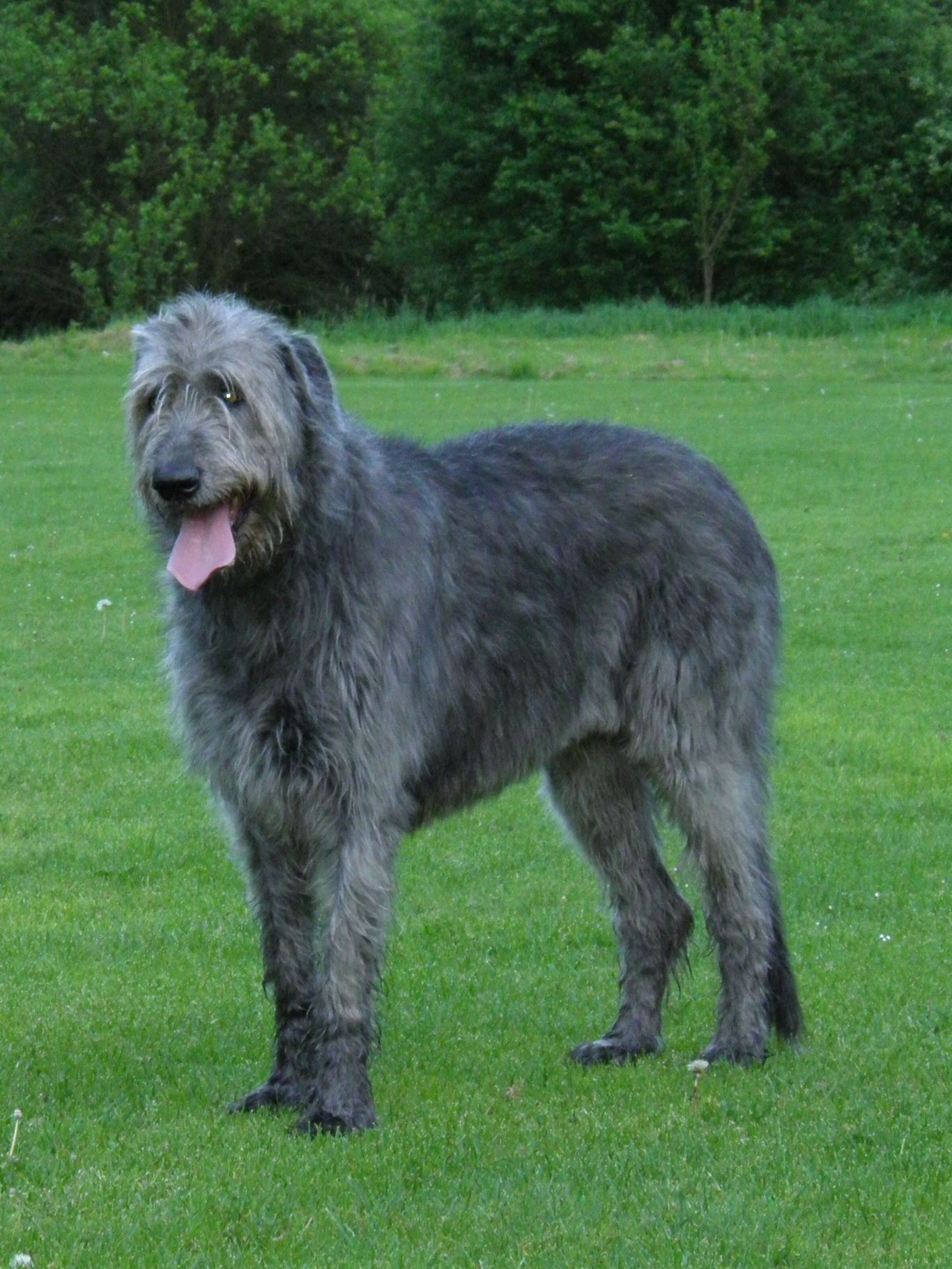
A Great Dane and an Irish Wolfhound, two giant dog breeds

A giant dog breed is any breed of dog known for its large size and weight that can exceed 45 kg (100 pounds). Breeds sometimes described as giant breeds include the Great Dane, Newfoundland, St. Bernard, the Irish Wolfhound and the Kuvasz. These breeds have seen a marked increase in their size since the nineteenth century as a result of selective breeding.

== History ==
These breeds have increased in size due to selective breeding. People bred dogs with certain characteristics like height, strength and calm behavior. For example, the Great Dane was bred in Germany to hunt boars, deer and bears. Similarly, the St. Bernard was created for a particular reason – to help rescue travelers in heavy snow in the mountains – and is known for its reliability and loyalty to those it rescues.

== Health ==
Giant dogs often struggle with health problems and often have quite short lifespans. Most of these dogs live between six and ten years. For example, Great Danes often only live up to around eight years. Giant dogs also often have problems with their bones, joints and hearts. Some common health problems are hip and elbow dysplasia, heart problems and bloating. For example, the Kuvasz is known to develop joint and thyroid problems.

== See also ==
- Selective breeding
- List of individual dogs § Dogs of unusual size
