= Bernardino Borlasca =

Italian composer (c. 1580 – c. 1631)

Bernardino Borlasca (c. 1580 – c. 1631) was an Italian composer of the Renaissance and early Baroque eras, noted for antiphonal choral music. He also wrote sacred and secular songs for a small number of singers, such as his canzonettas for three voices, published in 1611.

== Published works ==
- 1609: Scherzi musicali ecclesiastici sopra la cantica a tre voci ... appropriati per cantar fra concerti gravi in stile rappresentativo, con il basso continuo per l'organo
- 1611: Canzonette a tre voci ... appropriate per cantar nel chitarrone, lira doppia, cembalo, arpone, chitariglia alla spagnuola; o altro simile strumento da concerto ... libro secondo
- 1615: Cantica divae Mariae Virginis octonis vocibus, & varijs instrumentis concinenda, Op. 5
- 1616: Scala Iacob, octonis vocibus, et varijs instrumentis omnibus anni solemnitatibus decantanda, Op. 6
- 1617: Ardori spirituali a due, tre, e quattro voci ... libro primo, Op. 7
