= John Paul (given name) =

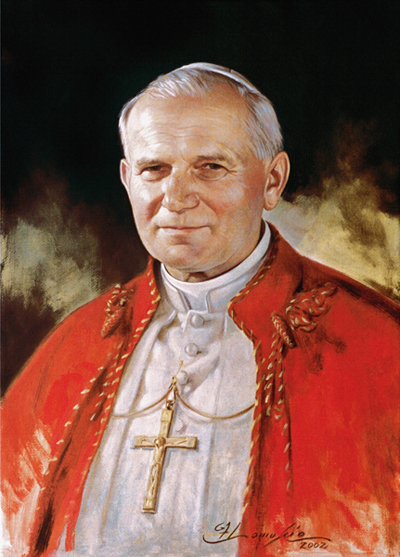
- Pope John Paul II

Other gender
- Feminine: Joan Paula

Other names
- Related names: John, Paul
- See also: Giampaolo, Jean-Paul

John Paul is a masculine double name, composed of the English names John and Paul. The primary form of the name is John Paul in English, and it is now present in several languages, such as Giovanni Paolo and Giampaolo in Italian, Juan Pablo in Spanish, João Paulo in Portuguese, Jean-Paul in French, and Johann Paul in German.

John Paul is a very popular name worldwide and has always held prominence in Italian contexts, such as Giovanni Paolo Panini, and in French contexts, such as Jean-Paul Sartre. The name became even more popular through the now-canonized Catholic saint, Pope John Paul II. The name John Paul (Latin: Ioannes Paulus) was the only double name used by a pope, the highest religious authority in the world.

== Notable examples ==
- Pope John Paul I (1912–1978)
- Pope John Paul II (1920–2005)
- John Paul (screenwriter) (1950–2022), Malayalam screenwriter
- John-Paul Danko, Canadian politician
- John Paul Getty (disambiguation), multiple people
- John Paul Jones (disambiguation), multiple people
- John Paul Stevens (1920–2019), American lawyer and jurist
- John Paul Vann (1924–1927), United States Army officer
- John Paul Young (born 1950), Australian pop singer

== See also ==
- John Paul (disambiguation)
- Pope John Paul (disambiguation)
