= Thomas Ravenscroft =

English musician, theorist and editor

Thomas Ravenscroft (c. 1588 – 1635) was an English musician, theorist and editor, notable as a composer of rounds and catches, and especially for compiling collections of English folk music and a collection of psalm settings.

== Biography ==
Little is known of Ravenscroft's early life. He probably sang in the choir of St. Paul's Cathedral from 1594, when a Thomas Raniscroft was listed on the choir rolls and remained there until 1600 under the directorship of Thomas Giles. He received his bachelor's degree in 1605 from Cambridge.

Ravenscroft's principal contributions are his collections of folk music, including catches, rounds, street cries, vendor songs, "freeman's songs" and other anonymous music, in three collections: Pammelia (1609), Deuteromelia or The Second Part of Musicks Melodie (1609) and Melismata (1611), which contains one of the best-known works in his collections, The Three Ravens. Some of the music he compiled has acquired extraordinary fame, though his name is rarely associated with the music; for example "Three Blind Mice" first appears in Deuteromelia.

He moved to Bristol, where he published a metrical psalter (The Whole Booke of Psalmes) in 1621. Many of the psalm settings were composed by Ravenscroft himself, while others were by other composers of the time, including Thomas Morley, Thomas Tomkins and John Dowland.

Ravenscroft: "I Have House and Land in Kent" (1611) on sampled instrumentation

As a composer, his works are mostly forgotten but include 11 anthems, 3 motets for five voices and 4 fantasias for viols.

As a writer, he wrote two treatises on music theory. The Briefe Discourse of the True (but Neglected) Use of Charact'ring the Degrees (London, 1614) includes 20 songs as examples: seven by John Bennet, two by Edward Pearce and the rest by Ravenscroft himself. Of these, the group of dialect songs 'Hodge und Malkyn' from the fifth a final section was nominated by Jeffrey Mark as the earliest example of a song-cycle in English music history. There is also A Treatise of Musick, which remains in manuscript (unpublished).

== Hymns ==
- Hark the glad sound! the Saviour comes (to the words of Philip Doddridge)
- The Alternative version of 'Dundee' hymn tune, 1615: Melody in the tenor part, harmonised, 1621.
- 'Lord, in thy name thy servants plead', tune 'Lincoln' from Ravenscroft's Psalter, words by John Keble, New English Hymnal 126
