= Jan Ziobro (politician) =

Polish politician

Member of the Sejm
- In office 9 October 2011 – 11 November 2015

Personal details
- Born: 4 September 1989 (age 37) Kraków, Poland
- Party: United Right
- Education: Kraków University of Economics
- Profession: Politician

Jan Paweł Ziobro (born 4 September 1989) is a Polish politician.

== Biography ==
He was born on 4 September 1989. Ziobro graduated from the Kraków University of Economics in 2011. He subsequently became employed at one of Kraków's banks. Ziobro served as the chairman of the regional structures of the Law and Justice Youth Forum. In 2010 he unsuccessfully ran for councilor in Wieliczka County. In 2011 Ziobro was elected as a Member of the Sejm. He was the youngest parliamentarian.
