= Polyptych of Lusina =

Late Gothic altarpiece, partially lost

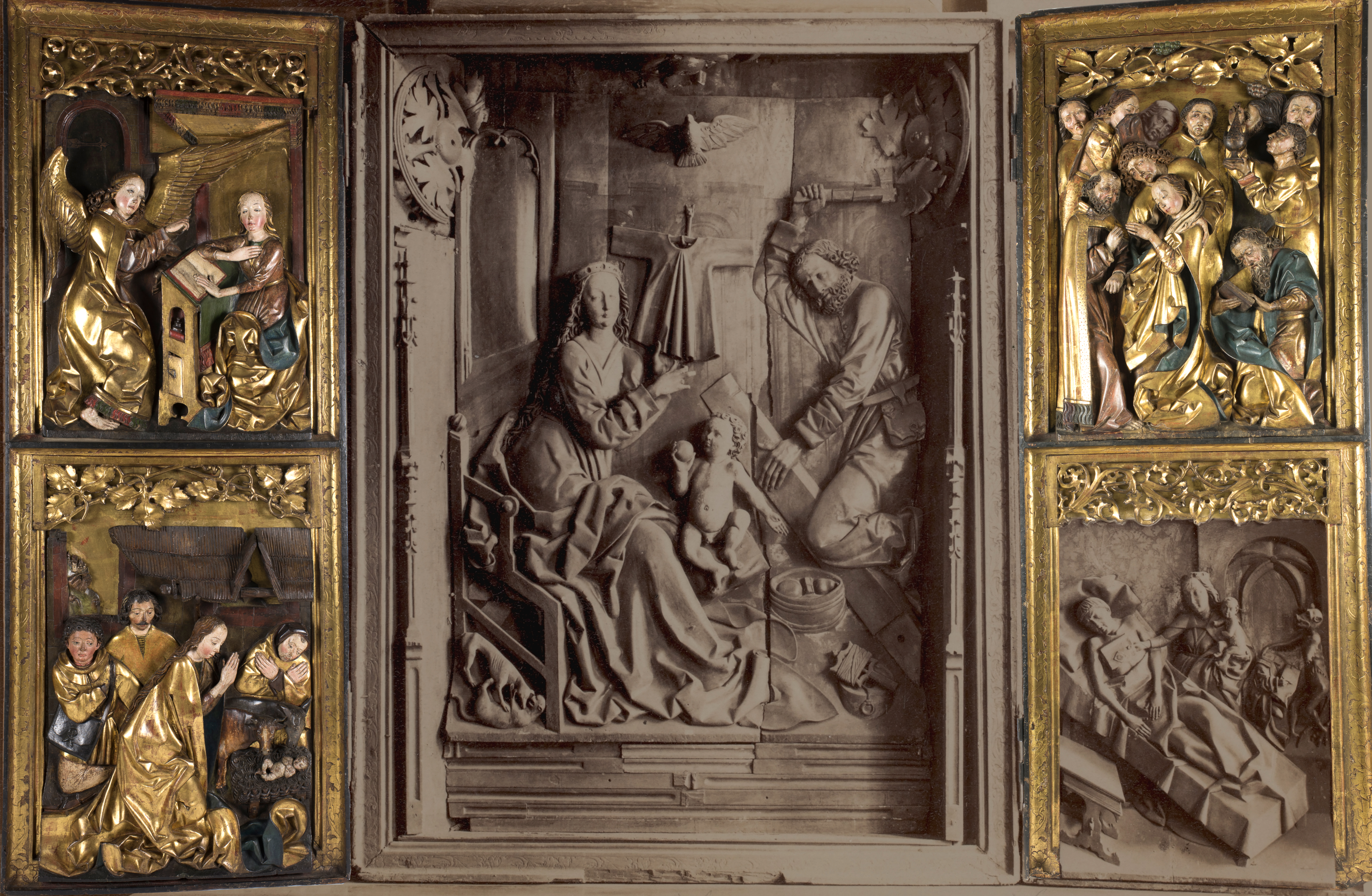
- Artist: unknown artists from Małopolska
- Year: 1505-1510
- Medium: polychrome lime timber, tempera, oil, gold, silver
- Dimensions: 68-69 cm × 184 cm (27–27 in × 72 in)
- Condition: lost - fragments of the polyptych entered into the register of war losses after World War II
- Location: National Museum, Kraków

The Polyptych of Lusina (Polish: Poliptyk z Lusiny, German: Polyptychon aus Lusina), late-Gothic retable, polyptych embellished with paintings and bas-reliefs, created at an unknown workshop in all likelihood located in Lesser Poland (or Galicia), c. 1510. The retable originally featured three views, visible upon opening successive pairs of wings.

Mühlmann's Office requisitioned inner wings and polyptych shrine cabinet in 1940, the artwork having been deposited with the National Museum in Kraków. After World War II, the Museum recovered the wings only, the main shrine cabinet with its "Holy Family" bas-relief and bas-relief wing section depicting a scene from "The Legend of Saint Theophilus of Adana" missing. Both retable sections have been listed in the "Catalogue of Wartime Losses" as No. 409.

== History ==
The retable's pre-mid-19th century history remains unknown, the Polyptych of Lusina mentioned for the first time around 1850, in the wake of the historical artefact having been bequeathed in two donations – by Karol Soczyński MD (in July 1850) and Józef Jerzmanowski (in November 1850) – to the Museum of Antiquity operating at the Kraków Learned Society. Before, until the year 1846, the retable had been allegedly held in the chapel of the manor owned by Leopold and Wincenty Soczyński, lords of the Lusina estate near Kraków.

The altar was shown to the general public in 1858 at the Exhibition of Antiquity organised by the Kraków Learned Society at the Lubomirski Palace on Świętego Jana (street). The exhibition catalogue features the first photograph of the Polyptych taken by Karol Beyer. The photograph shows the piece open, bas-relief scenes the only ones visible. Once the Learned Society had closed its doors, the retable was donated to the Academy of Arts and Sciences (in 1871), then to the National Museum in Kraków. The latter received it as two separate deposits – outer wings in 1891, the body and inner wings – in 1938.

Polyptych components did not undergo any modification in the years 1858–1900, as proven in a photograph by Ignacy Krieger who positioned the artwork exactly as in Karol Beyer's snapshot. Yet the technical condition of the retable did change for the worse – hence the 1928 conservation programme outlining the development of a new support structure for the central shrine cabinet, and scheduling general structural and aesthetic works. These works were to be entrusted to painter and conservator Wiesław Zarzycki – yet it remains unknown whether the programme had been implemented at all, or to what extent.

After World War II had broken out, the piece was seized by the occupant in 1940 and entered into the Sichergestelle Kunstwerke as number 247 and on March 1, 1940, requisitioned by the occupier. During that time, the retable was exhibited twice – first in May 1941 at the exhibition Veit Stoss-Ausstellung Krakau at the Collegium Maius, seat of the Institut für Deutsche Ostarbeit, then in 1942, at the exhibition Altdeutsche Kunst aut Krakau und dem Karpathenland. During the latter (held at the same venue as the former), visitors could only view left retable wing bas-reliefs featuring "The Dormition of Mary" and "The Legend of Saint Theophilus of Adana". In the period between the two shows, the Polyptych was subjected to conservation works carried out by Eduard Kneisel, and prepared for transportation out of Kraków (in all likelihood in parts). The pair of (probably inner) wings free of bas-reliefs was deposited in museum storage at the Wawel Castle, together with ornamental woodcarvings of intaglio-featuring sections. Three of the five bas-reliefs were recovered after World War II in 1948, brought in from the National Museum in Warsaw. Yet the pre-repossession location or condition of painted wings remains unknown.

Following repossession, Polyptych wings were yet again subjected to conservation works (by Mieczysław Gąsecki) in the years 1947–1948. Aforementioned woodcarvings were found in 1963, fitted in retable sections only in 1975. Polyptych cabinet pinnacles were also preserved at the National Museum in Kraków. Recovered, preserved and replenished, retable wings were shown at two exhibitions: Polish Guild Art from the 14th to the 18th Century at the National Museum in Kraków, and Art More Precious than Gold at the Wawel Castle. Today, they are part of a permanent display at Bishop Erazm Ciolek's Palace, a branch of the National Museum in Kraków at Kanonicza No. 17.

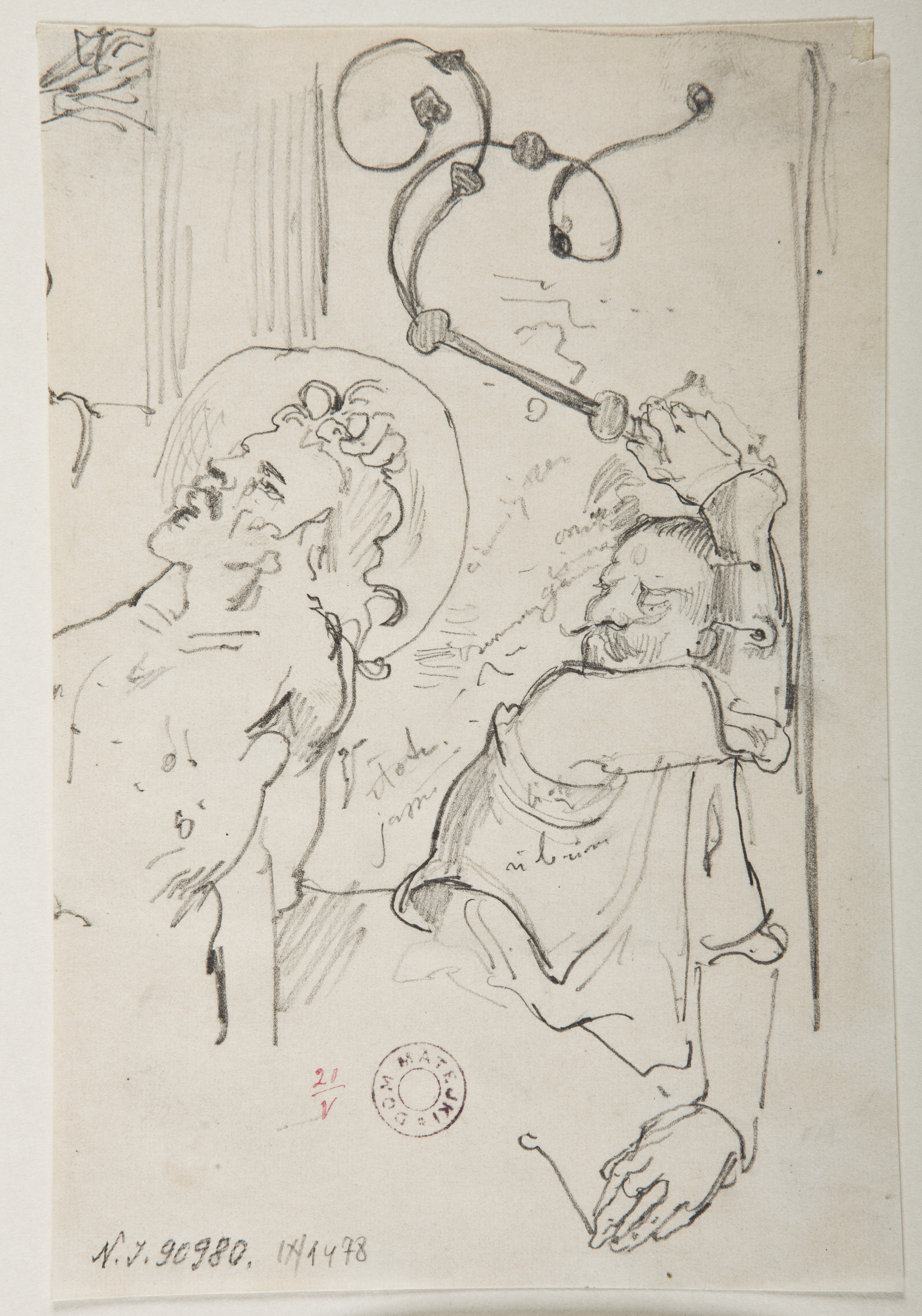
Jan Matejko, sketch of the Polyptych of Lusina, pencil, paper, no date, Jan Matejko's Collection

In the collection of the National Museum in Kraków there is a sketch by Jan Matejko, associated with the Lusina Polyptych, copying the composition of a fragment of the painted quatrefoil of the Sunday altar: The Flagellation of Christ. The sheet is described with sketchbook no: 21/V and belongs to the numerous drawings of medieval artworks created by Matejko.

== Appearance ==
The Polyptych of Lusina was originally a pentaptych fitted with two pairs of movable wings. Oldest mid-19th-century sources documenting the retable suggest that the superstructure or predella had been missing at the time already. Pursuant to the liturgical purpose of a shrine cabinet, the lavishness of altar ornamentation was incremental in the retable's successive views.

=== Everyday view ===
When closed, the altar depicted a pair of outer wings horizontally divided into two sections, upper and lower, featuring painted images of saints: Saint Stanislaus, Saint Anne, Saint Florian and Saint Catherine of Alexandria. While the condition of paintings (rather simple in form) precludes a full deciphering of the nature of painting as such, the images had been adorned with gilded nimbi, invisible to the naked eye. In all probability, the degradation of this particular detail was caused by variable weather conditions to a low technical quality painting.

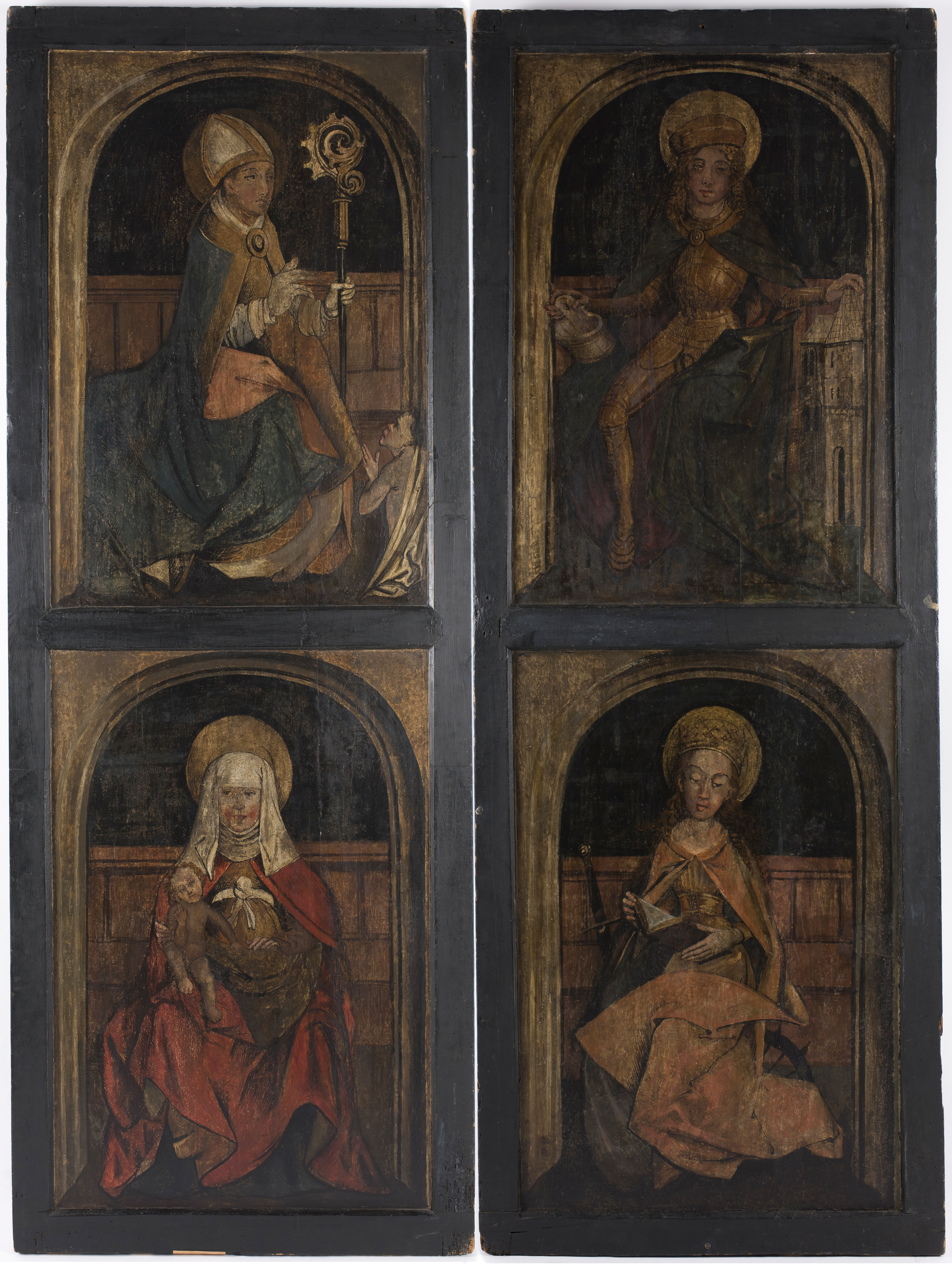
The Polyptych of Lusina, painted quatrefoil of the daily relief - saints and holy persons

=== Sunday view ===
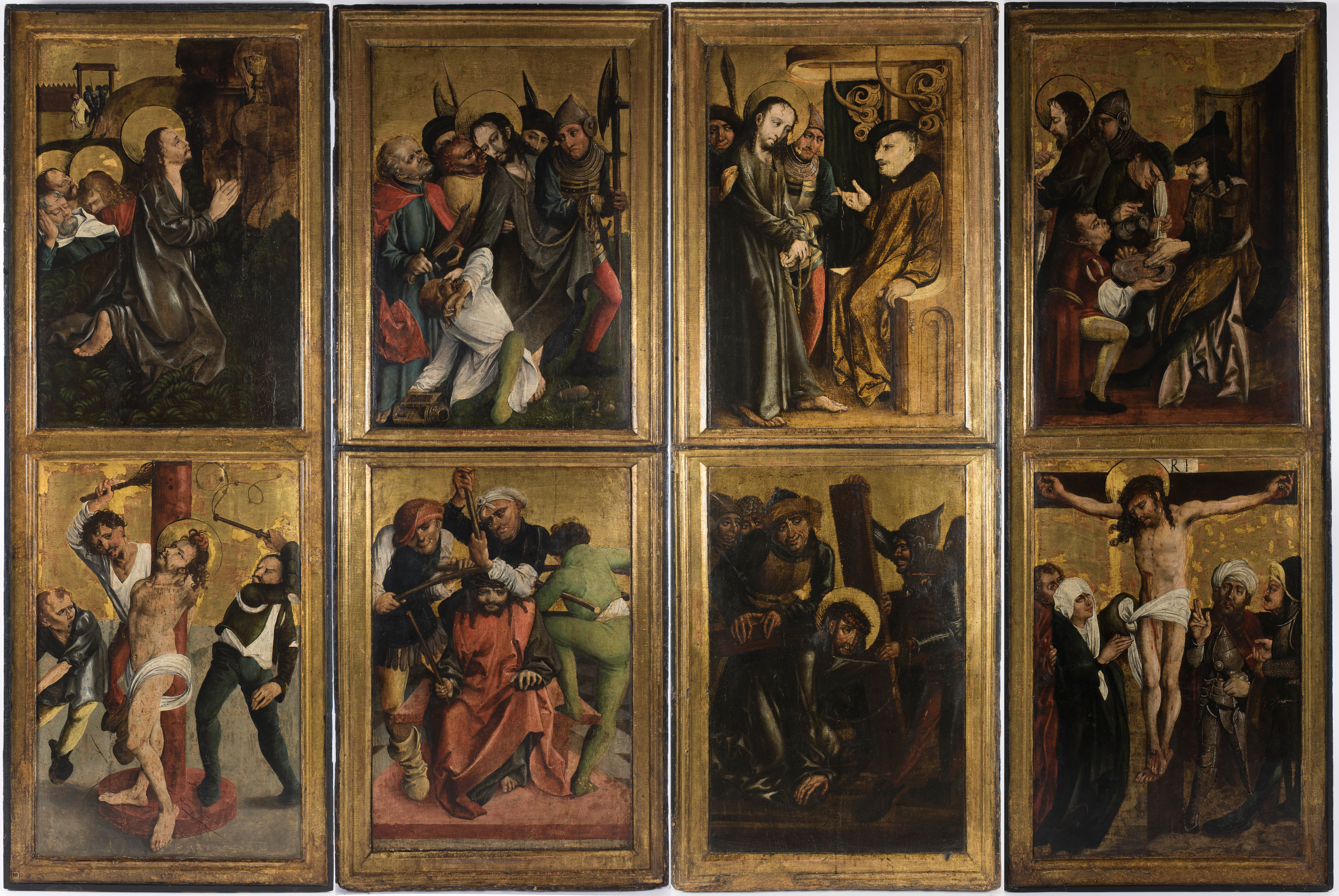
The Polyptych of Lusina, painted quatrefoil of the Sunday relief

Once the first pair of wings opened, two rows depicting painted passion cycle scenes were revealed, their background surfaces unpatterned, gilded and silvered. Eight scenes depicting the following sequence – "Jesus Praying in Gethsemane", "The Arrest of Christ", "Christ before Caiaphas", "The Judgement of Pontius Pilate", "The Flagellation", "The Crowning with Thorns", "Jesus Falling beneath the Cross", and "The Crucifixion" – are similar in expression, outlines vivid, contrasts between fine, transparent layers of paint and thick impastos pronounced. They are blatant both in dynamic images – such as "The Flagellation" and "The Crowning with Thorns" – and in static scenes, such as "Jesus Praying in Gethsemane" and "Christ before Caiaphas". The composition of everyday view sections features a rather "tight" framing, the painter(s) having developed scene dynamics by using diagonal and circular layouts, foreshortenings, and – a rarity in contemporaneous painting – cropped scenes, the latter intended to engage viewers in represented events. "Jesus Praying in Gethsemane" apart – where mid-ground was introduced with intent to enrich the image narrative – composition has been limited to the foreground and (occasionally) background. The surface of all paintings is gilded, gold- and silverleaf also used to embellish nimbi, weaponry elements, and vessels rendered in three-dimensional shape and texture with the use of graphic measures, such as black hatching lines highlighted in white or gold (e.g. in armour, chainmail, receptacles).

The condition of all paintings points to considerable destruction. Surfaces washed and repainted in the past impede the proper aesthetic reception of images which had been painted to emulate visual exemplars popular and known at the time: representations of Passion of Christ by Hans Schäufelein and Lucas Cranach the Elder. One may well assume that the sections in question had been deprived of some glazing.

=== Feast-day view ===
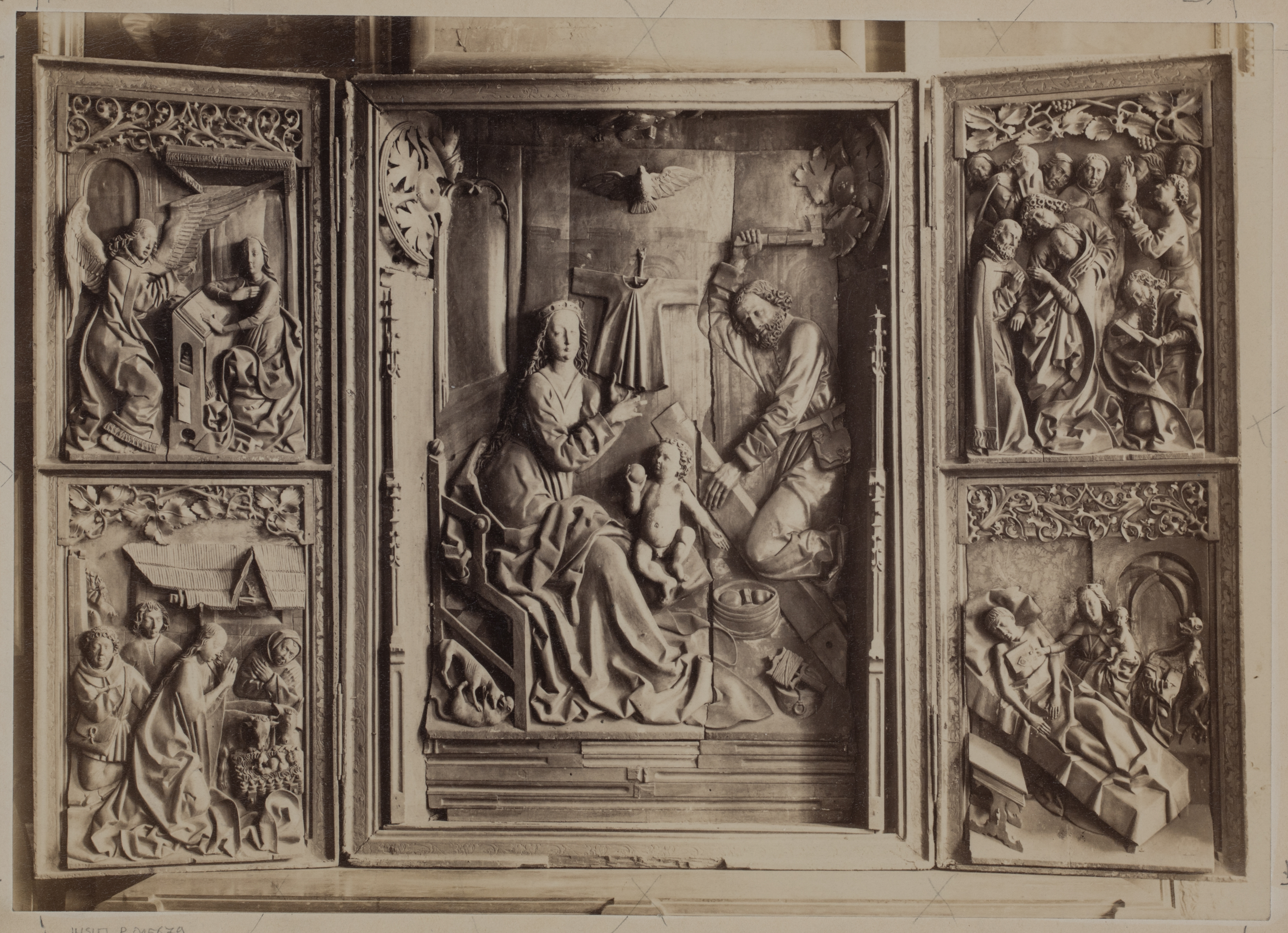
The Polyptych of Lusina, open altar - Christmas unveiling, photograph from the Ignacy Krieger's workshop, pre-1900, Phototeque of the Jagiellonian University

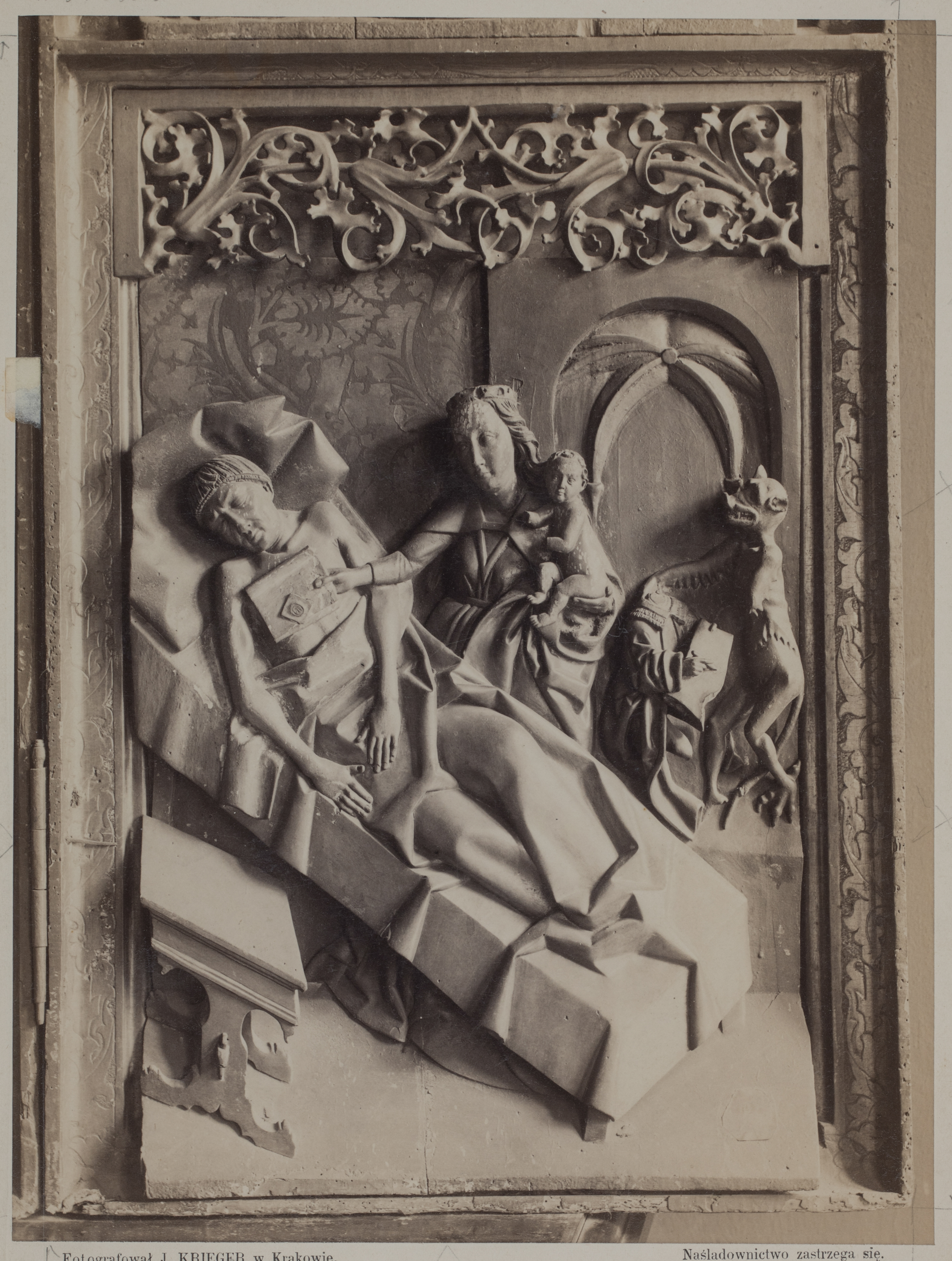
The Polyptych of Lusina, bas-relief of the Christmas relief with a representation of the Virgin Mary returning the cyrograph to St Theophilus of Adana (lost), Works of Ignacy Krieger, pre-1900, Phototeque of the Jagiellonian University

Once the retable's inner wings were opened, its most sophisticated artistic view was revealed, comprising five polychromed bas-reliefs, gilded and silvered, depicting scenes from the life of Mary. Strong Veit Stoss' influence was clearly visible in composition layouts and representation details. The centre of the retable featured a larger and more artfully rendered bas-relief of "The Holy Family", each of the wings depicting two scenes from Mary's life: "The Annunciation", "The Adoration of Shepherds", "The Dormition of Mary", and a "Legend of Saint Theophilus of Adana" scene

Referencing Stoss' graphic print of the Holy Family, the first one showed Mary weaving Christ's robe, the centrally placed Child holding an apple, and Saint Joseph at carpentry work. The author placed a fighting dog and monkey beneath a bench Mary is seated upon on. The scene is crested with an image of the Holy Spirit in the form of a dove. The bas-relief is unique in high-quality artfulness, skilful rendition of space in bas-relief technique, and levity in depicting the physiognomy of all characters, anatomy of the child and all draping, hieratic representation regardless. The iconographic motif of the robe Mary is weaving for Jesus is a curious proposition; traditionally, it is associated with the tunica inconsutilis mentioned in the Gospel of John, the woven tunic soldiers who crucified Jesus would cast lots for.

Four smaller sections adorning the wings were sculpted more schematically. The lost "Legend of Saint Theophilus of Adana" relief was the most interesting one in terms of iconography, showing Mary returning the contract Theophilus had signed with the Devil. Having recovered it on Theophilus' request, she thus saves his soul.

=== Fragments of quarters, state 2018 ===
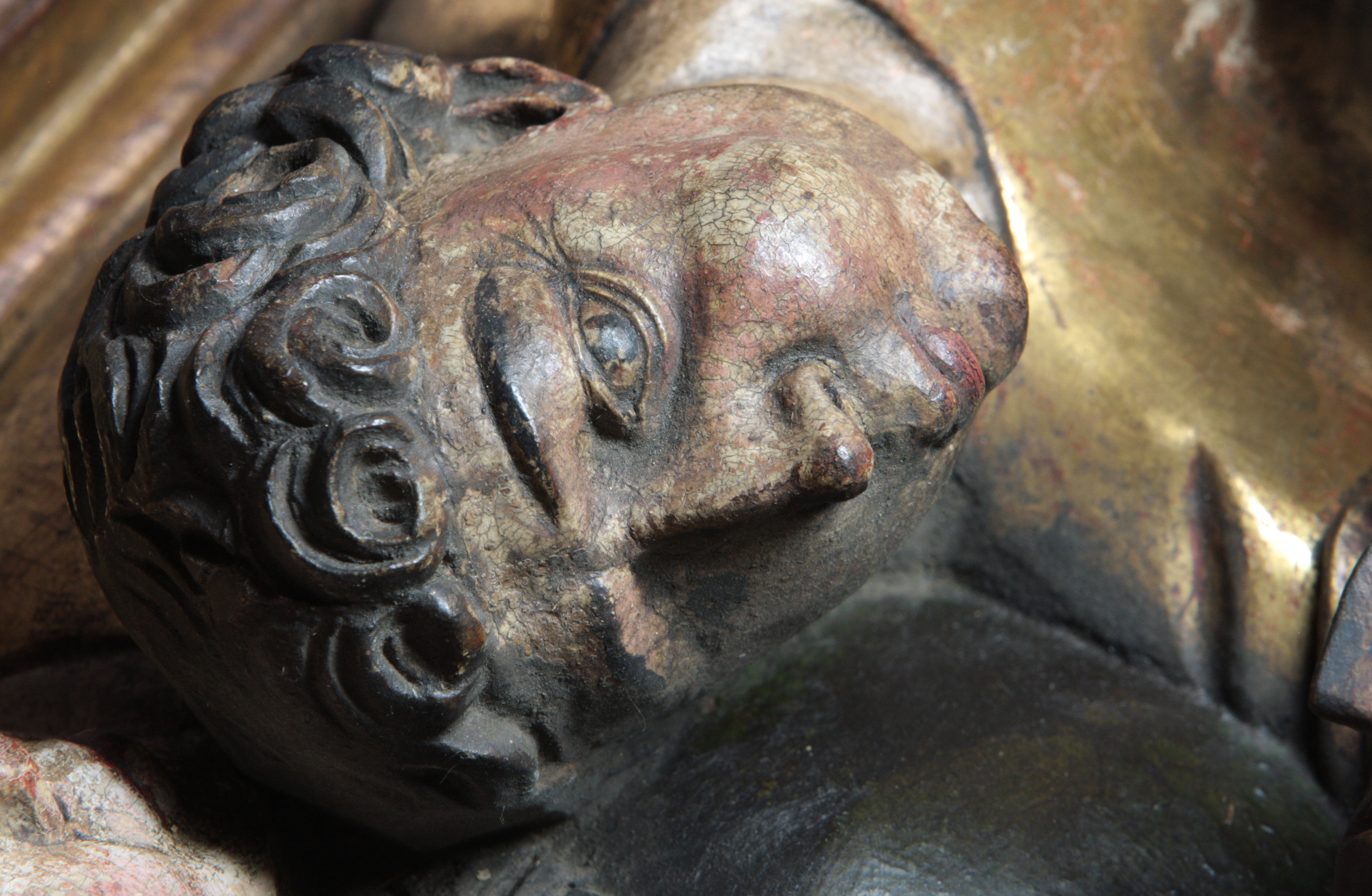
The Polyptych of Lusina, open altarpiece, fragment of the bas-relief Death of Mary, carved wood, polychrome, gilt

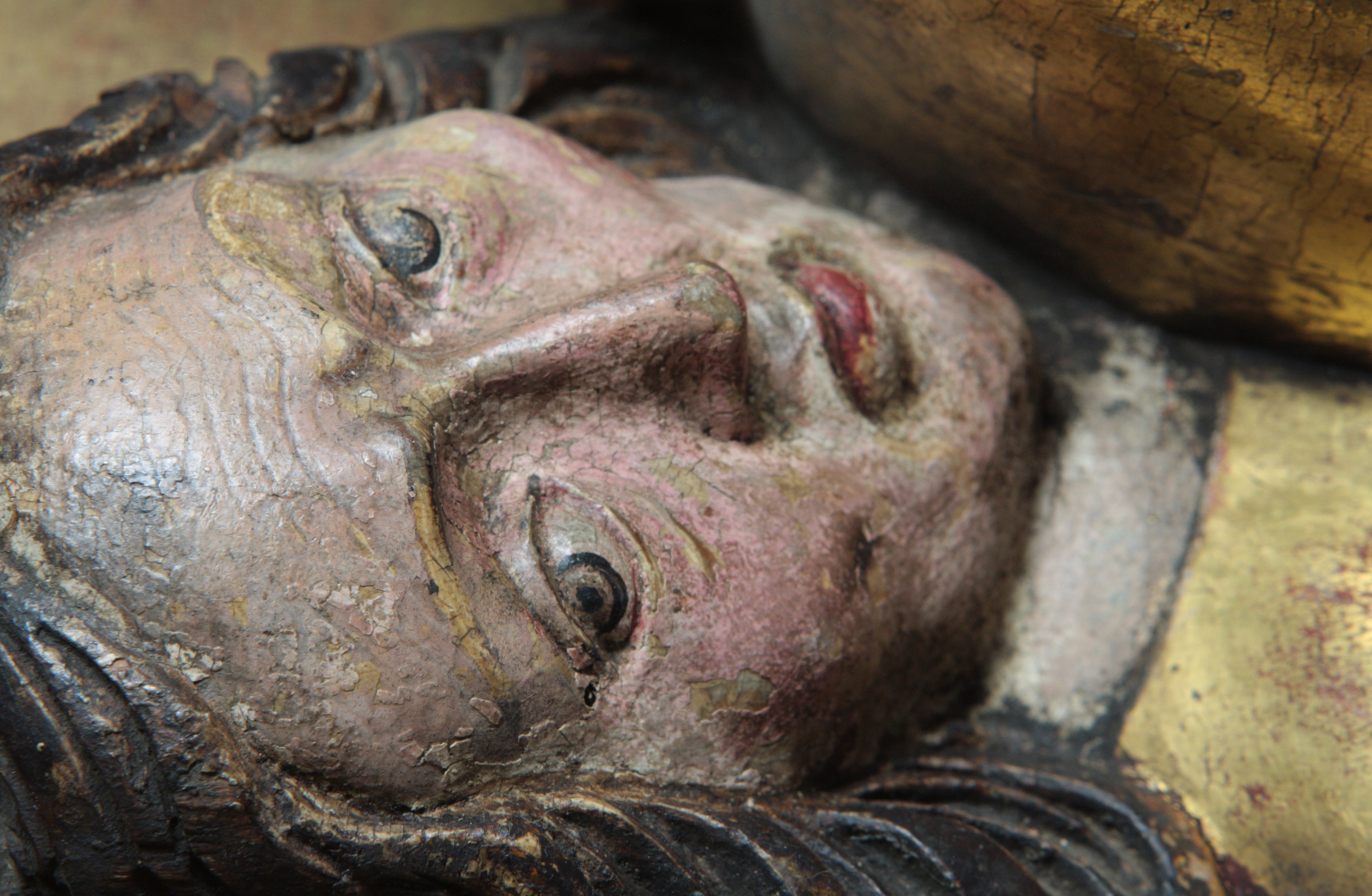
The Polyptych of Lusina, open altar, fragment of the relief Death of Mary, carved wood, polychrome, gilt

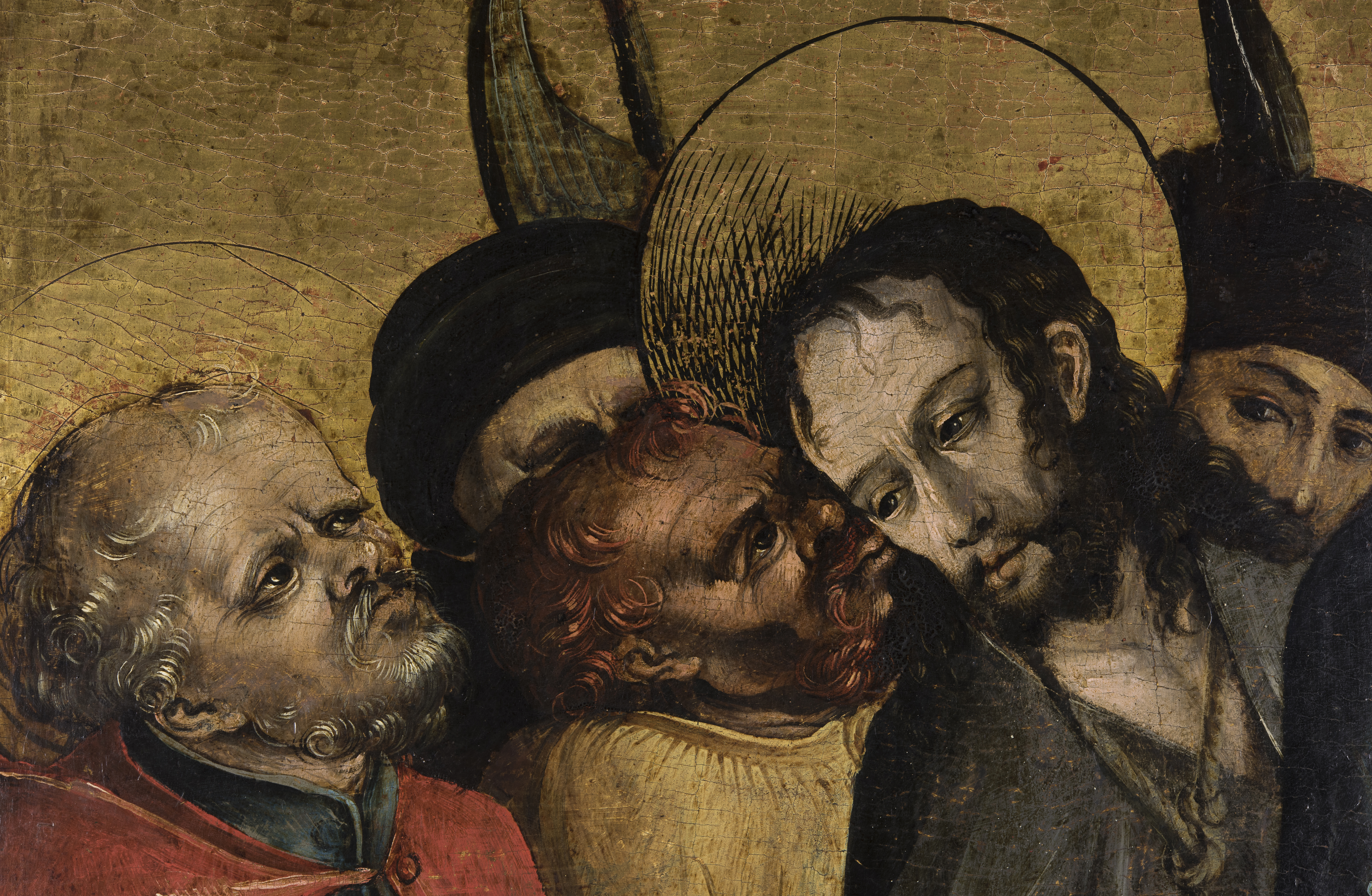
The Polyptych of Lusina, Sunday view, fragment of polychrome quatrefoil: The Kiss of Judas

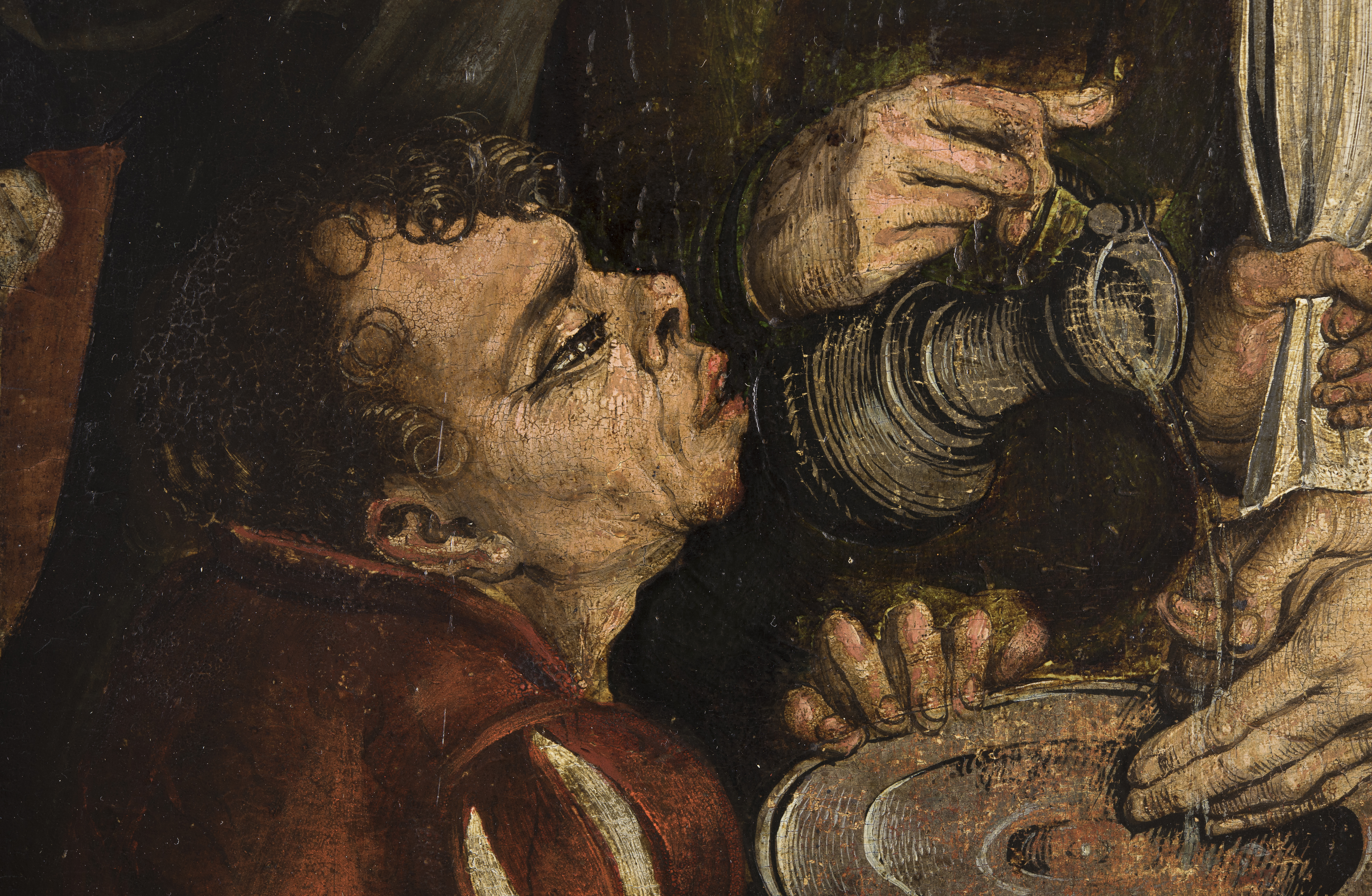
The Polyptych of Lusina, Sunday relief, fragment of the quatrefoil: Christ before Pilate

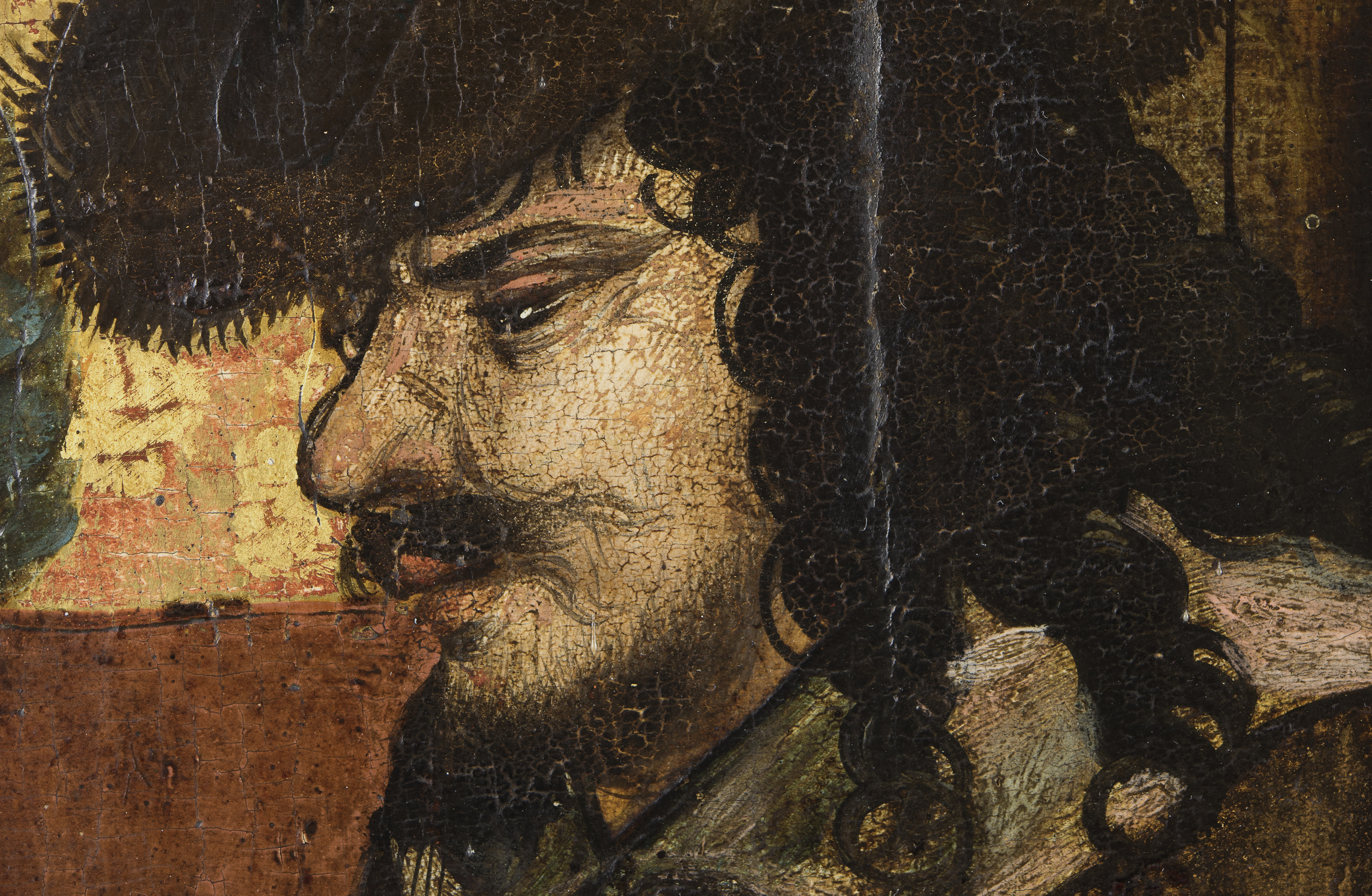
The Polyptych of Lusina, Sunday relief, fragment of the quatrefoil: Christ before Pilate

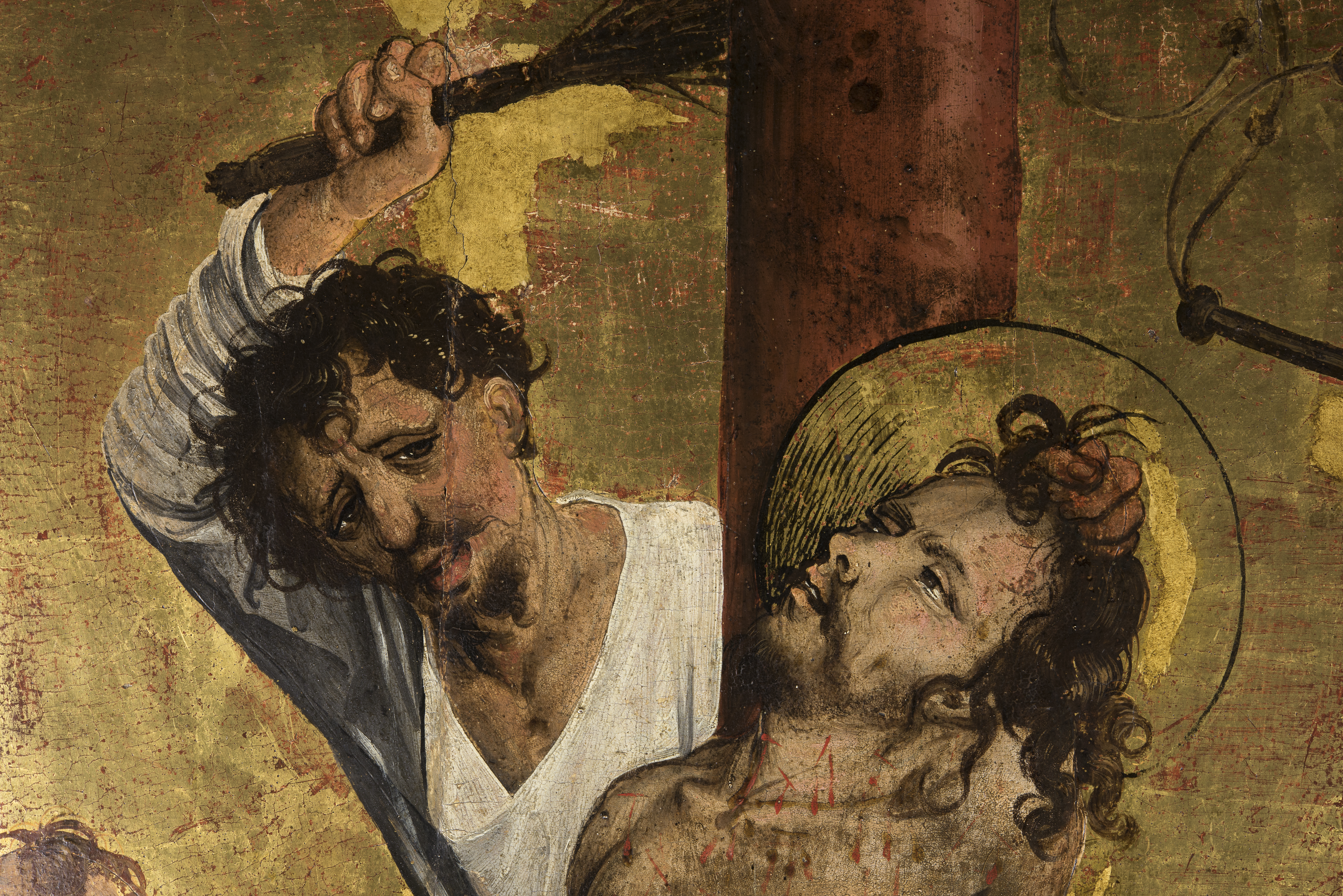
The Polyptych of Lusina, Sunday view, fragment of the section: Scourging of Christ

== Sources ==
- E. Behrens, Die Originalwerke auf der Veit-Stoss-Ausstellung Kraków 1941, „Die Burg" 2, 1941, z. 4, p. 45-47, il. 3–7.
- E. Behrens, Altdeutsche Kunst aus Kraków und dem Karpathenland, Kraków 1942, no cat. 17, p. 26.
- G. Barthel, Die Ausstrahlungen der Kunst des Veit Stoss im Osten, Munich 1944, p. 53.
- K. Estreicher młodszy, Cultural losses of Poland during the German occupation 1939–1944 with original documents of the looting, Kraków 2003, p. 674. (there: confiscation protocol from March 1, 1940).
