= Wadowice =

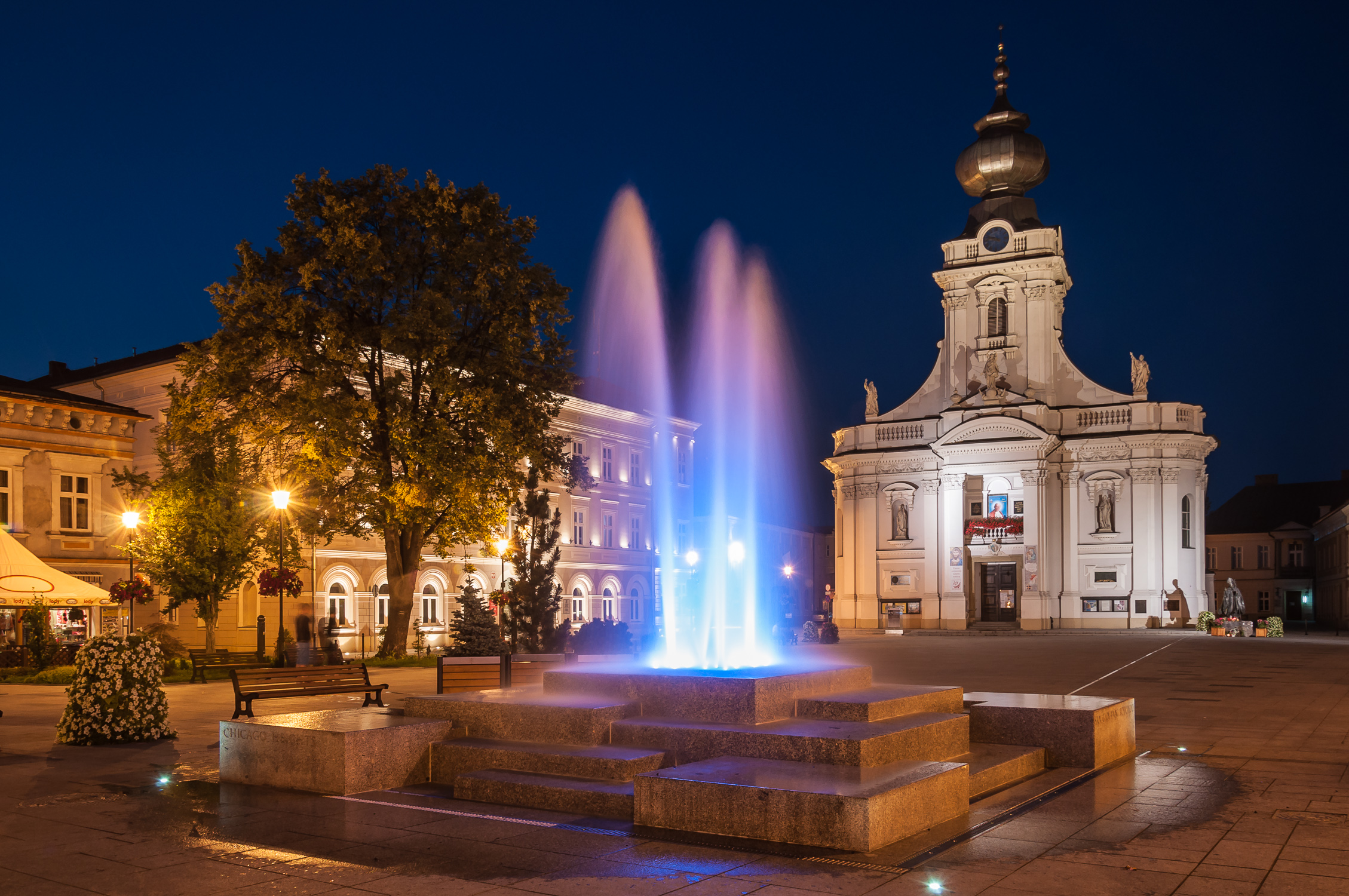
- View of the Main Square with the Baroque Basilica of Presentation of Virgin Mary

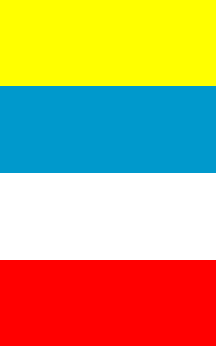
- Flag Coat of arms

- Location within Poland
- Coordinates: 49°53′N 19°30′E
- Country: Poland
- Voivodeship: Lesser Poland
- County: Wadowice
- Gmina: Wadowice
- First mentioned: 14th century
- Town rights: 1430

Government
  - Mayor: Bartosz Kaliński (PiS)

Area
  - Total: 10.52 km^{2} (4.06 sq mi)
- Highest elevation: 318 m (1,043 ft)
- Lowest elevation: 250 m (820 ft)

Population (2022)
  - Total: 17,455
  - Density: 1,659/km^{2} (4,297/sq mi)
- Time zone: UTC+1 (CET)
  - Summer (DST): UTC+2 (CEST)
- Postal code: 34–100
- Area code: +48 33
- Car plates: KWA
- Website: http://www.wadowice.pl

Wadowice (Polish: [vadɔˈvit͡sɛ]) is a town in the Lesser Poland Voivodeship in southern Poland, 50 kilometres (31 miles) southwest of Kraków with 17,455 inhabitants (2022), situated on the Skawa river, confluence of Vistula, in the eastern part of Silesian Foothills (Pogórze Śląskie). Wadowice is known for being the birthplace of Karol Wojtyła, later Pope John Paul II and Godwin von Brumowski, Austria-Hungary’s best flying ace with 35 credited and an additional 8 possible wins in the air.

== History ==
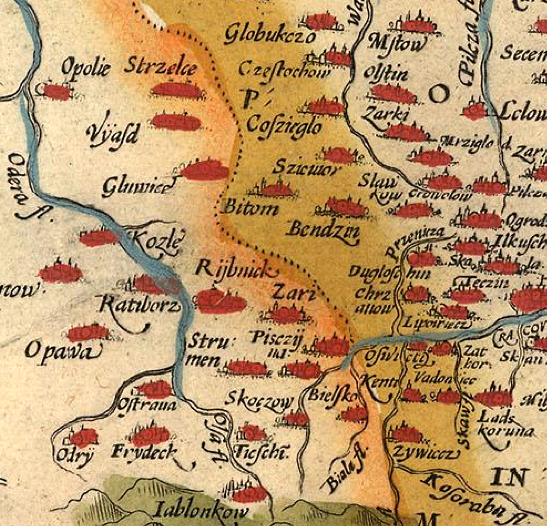
Fragment of a map from 1592 with Vadowice marked

The first permanent settlement in the area of today's Wadowice was founded in the late 10th century or early 11th century. According to a local legend, the town was founded by a certain Wad or Wład, a short form for the Slavic name of Ladislaus (Polish: 'Władysław'). The town was first mentioned as Wadowicze in St. Peter penny register in the years 1325–1327. In 1327 it is also mentioned (under the same name) in a fief registry sent from prince John I Scholastyk of Oświęcim to Bohemian king John I, Count of Luxemburg. At this time it was a trading settlement belonging to the Dukes of Silesia of the Piast dynasty, and according to some historians it was already a municipality. In 1430 a great fire destroyed the town. It was soon rebuilt and granted city rights, along with a city charter and a self-government, based on the then-popular Kulm law. The privileges, granted by Prince Kazimierz I of Oświęcim led to a period of fast reconstruction and growth.

The administrative division of the region in the times of regional division was complicated. Initially, between 1313/1317 and 1445, Wadowice belonged to the Silesian Duchy of Oświęcim and after 1445 to the Duchy of Zator. In 1482 Władysław I of Zator inherited only half of his father's lands and created a separate Duchy of Wadowice, which lasted until his death in 1493. The following year his brother and successor, Jan V of Zator abdicated. At the same time the land was subject to Bohemian overlordship, which lasted until the following year, when the Duchy was bought by the Kings of Poland and incorporated as a Silesian County. Finally, the county was incorporated into the Kraków Voivodeship of the Lesser Poland Province of the Kingdom of Poland in 1564.

In the 16th–17th centuries Wadowice was a regional centre of crafts and trade. Among the most notable sons of the town was Marcin Wadowita, a theologian, philosopher and a deacon of the Kraków Academy. He was also the founder of a hospital and a basic school in Wadowice. However, several plagues and fires halted the prosperity and the town's growth was eventually halted as well.

=== Late modern period ===
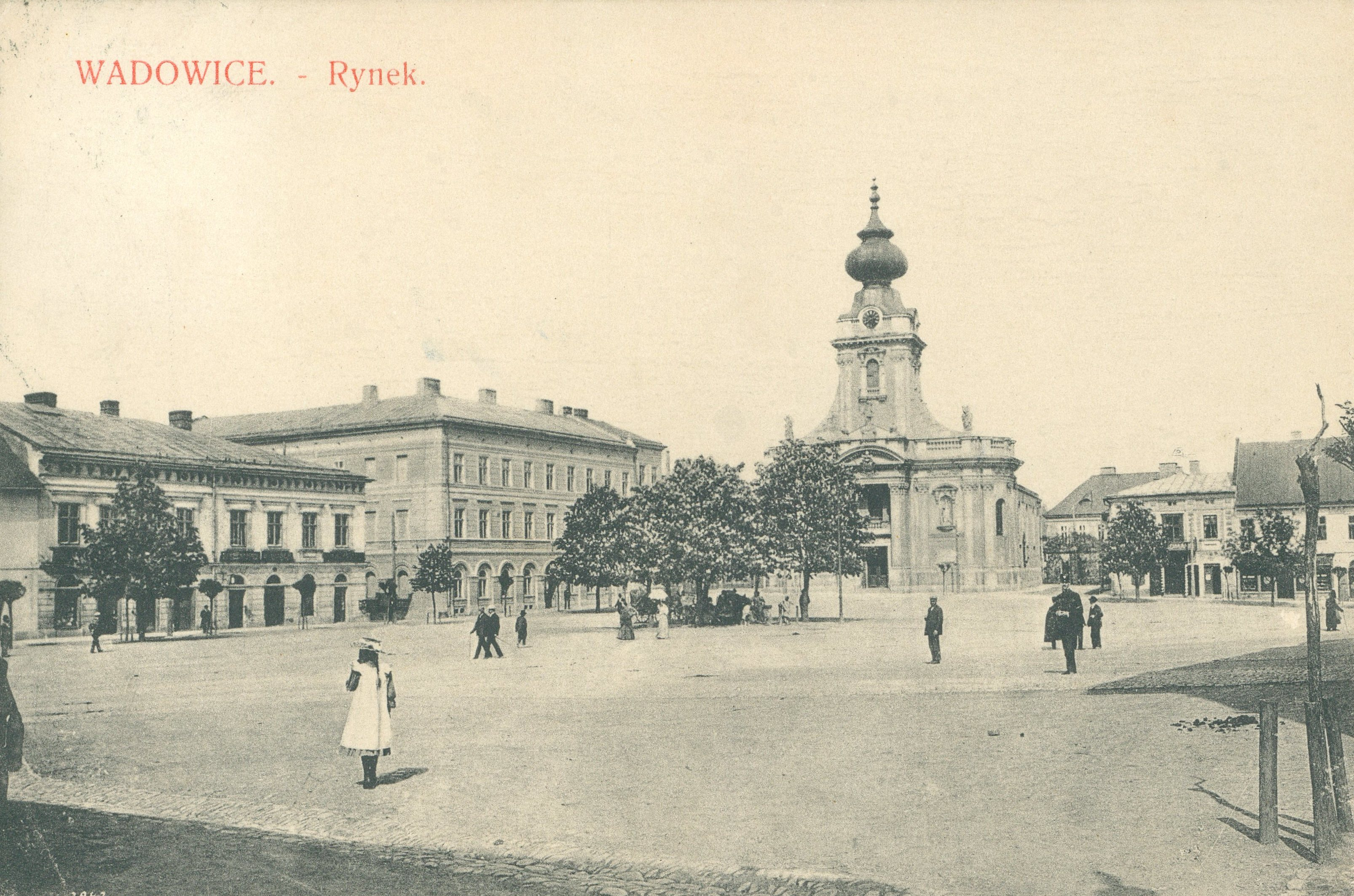
Early 20th-century view of the main square

In the effect of the First Partition of Poland, Wadowice was annexed by Austria, incorporated into the newly established Kingdom of Galicia, under direct Austrian rule, and renamed Frauenstadt. The town's growth started soon afterwards, after a road linking Vienna with Lviv was built. The town became a seat of a communal administration and since 1867 – a county site. Small industries were developing slowly during the 19th century. New inhabitants settled in the area, attracted by the industry, new military barracks and various administrative institutions. In addition, a new hospital and a regional court were erected in the town centre. Finally, in the last 25 years of the 19th century partial liberalisation of the Austro-Hungarian monarchy led to creation of various Polish cultural and scientific societies.

After World War I and the dissolution of the monarchy, Wadowice became part of the newly reborn Poland. The seat of a powiat remained in the town and in 1919 the inhabitants of the area formed the 12th Infantry Regiment that took part in the Polish–Soviet War of 1919–1920. In 1920 Karol Wojtyła was born in Wadowice (he became the bishop of Kraków, then Pope John Paul II, and was canonized after his death).

=== World War II ===
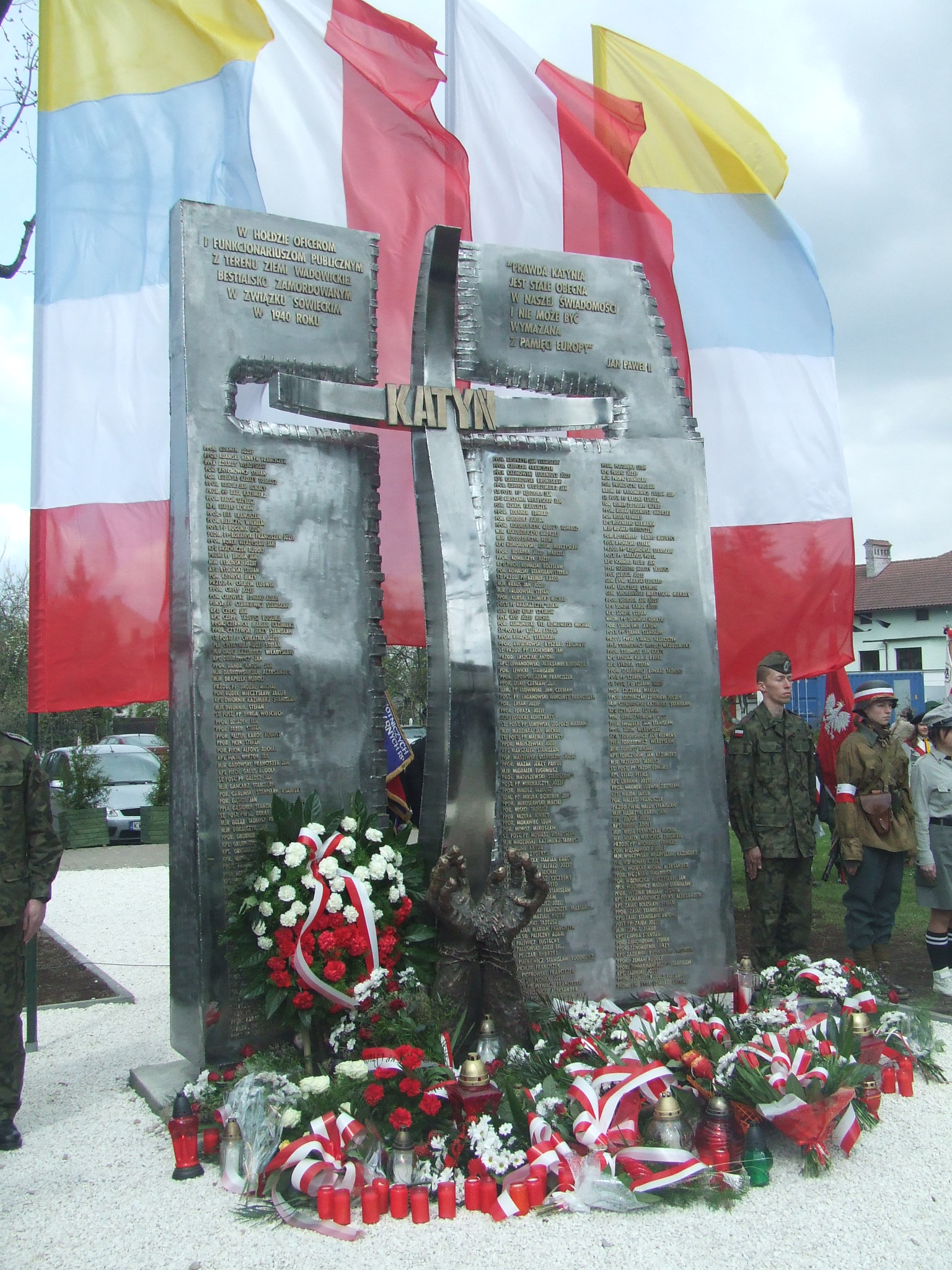
Katyn massacre memorial

After the Polish Defensive War of 1939, Germany occupied the area and on 26 October Wadowice was annexed by Nazi Germany. On 29 December of the same year the town was renamed to Wadowitz. Initially the Polish intelligentsia was targeted by harsh German racial and cultural policies and hundreds of people from the area, most notably priests, teachers and artists, were murdered in mass executions (see Intelligenzaktion). Many were imprisoned in the infamous Montelupich Prison in Kraków and then murdered in the Krzesławice Fort of the Kraków Fortress in December 1939. Hundreds more were expelled and resettled to the General Government in order to make place for German settlers in accordance with the Lebensraum policy. Germany also established and operated a Nazi prison in the town. Between 1941 and 1943 a ghetto was established in the town. Almost the entire local Jewish population (more than 2,000) was exterminated, mostly in the nearby Auschwitz concentration camp. In addition, the Germans set up a prisoner-of-war camp for Allied soldiers and a penal camp that served as a transfer camp for various German concentration camps. Despite German terror, the Home Army units were active in the area, most notably in the town itself and in the Beskid mountains to the south of it. After the German occupation, the town returned to Poland, although with a Soviet-installed communist regime, which stayed in power until the Fall of Communism in the 1980s.

=== Present ===
After the war, in 1945 Wadowice retained its powiat town status and until 1975 served as a notable centre of commerce and transport in the Kraków Voivodeship. After that the town was transferred to the newly created Bielsko-Biała Voivodeship. After the peaceful transformation of the political and economical system in Poland (in 1989), most of the local industry was found inefficient and went bankrupt. However, the ecological and historical heritage of the area as well as its status as the birthplace of Pope John Paul II led to fast growth of tourism. Currently more than 200,000 people visit Wadowice every year and this number is rising.

== Economy ==
Wadowice is today mainly a centre for tourism and sightseeing, but also a place for small industries such as the production of machines and construction materials. The town is also the headquarters of the multinational food company and biggest juice-maker of Poland, Maspex, and the shoe producer Badura.

== Culture and sightseeing ==
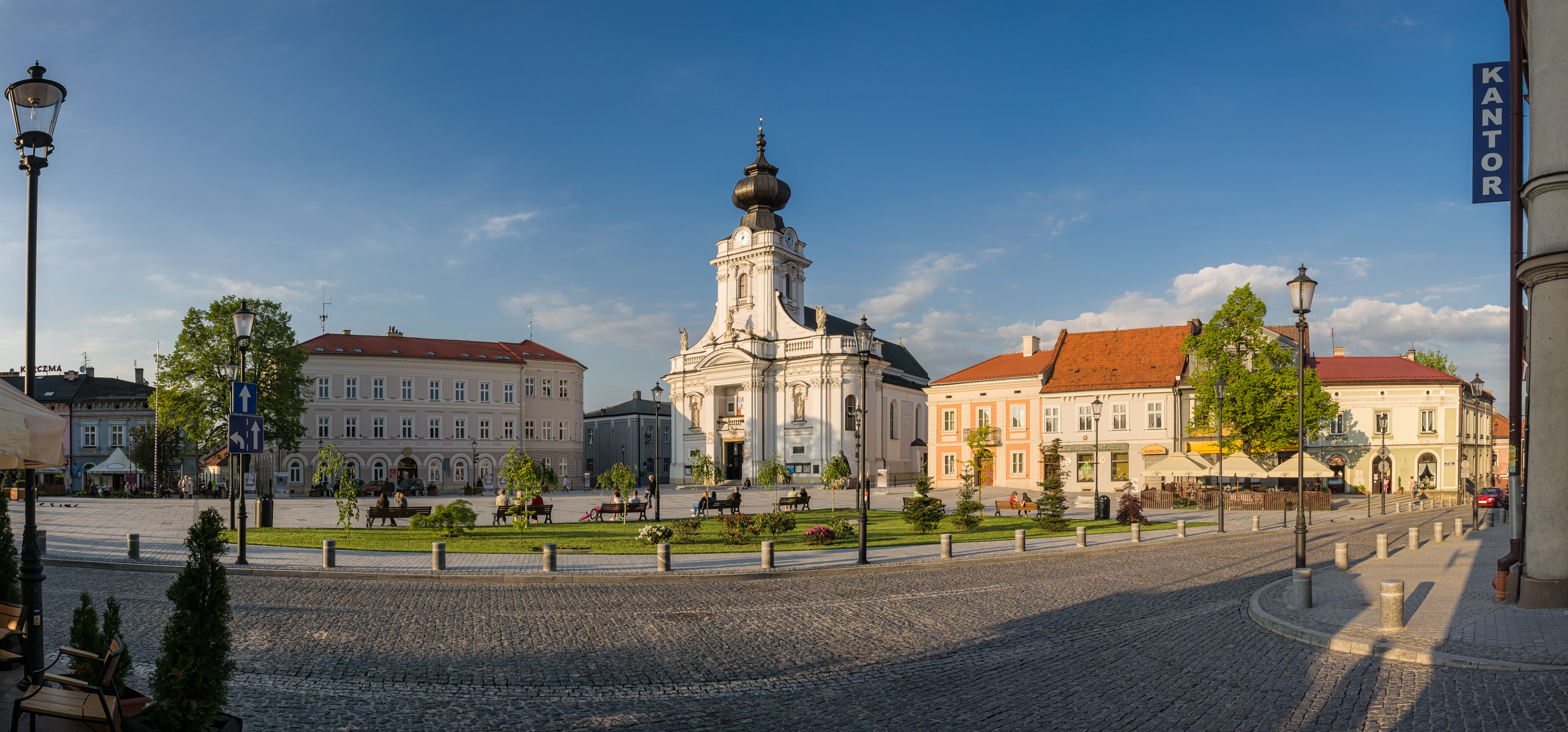
John Paul II Square with the Baroque Basilica of Presentation of Virgin Mary

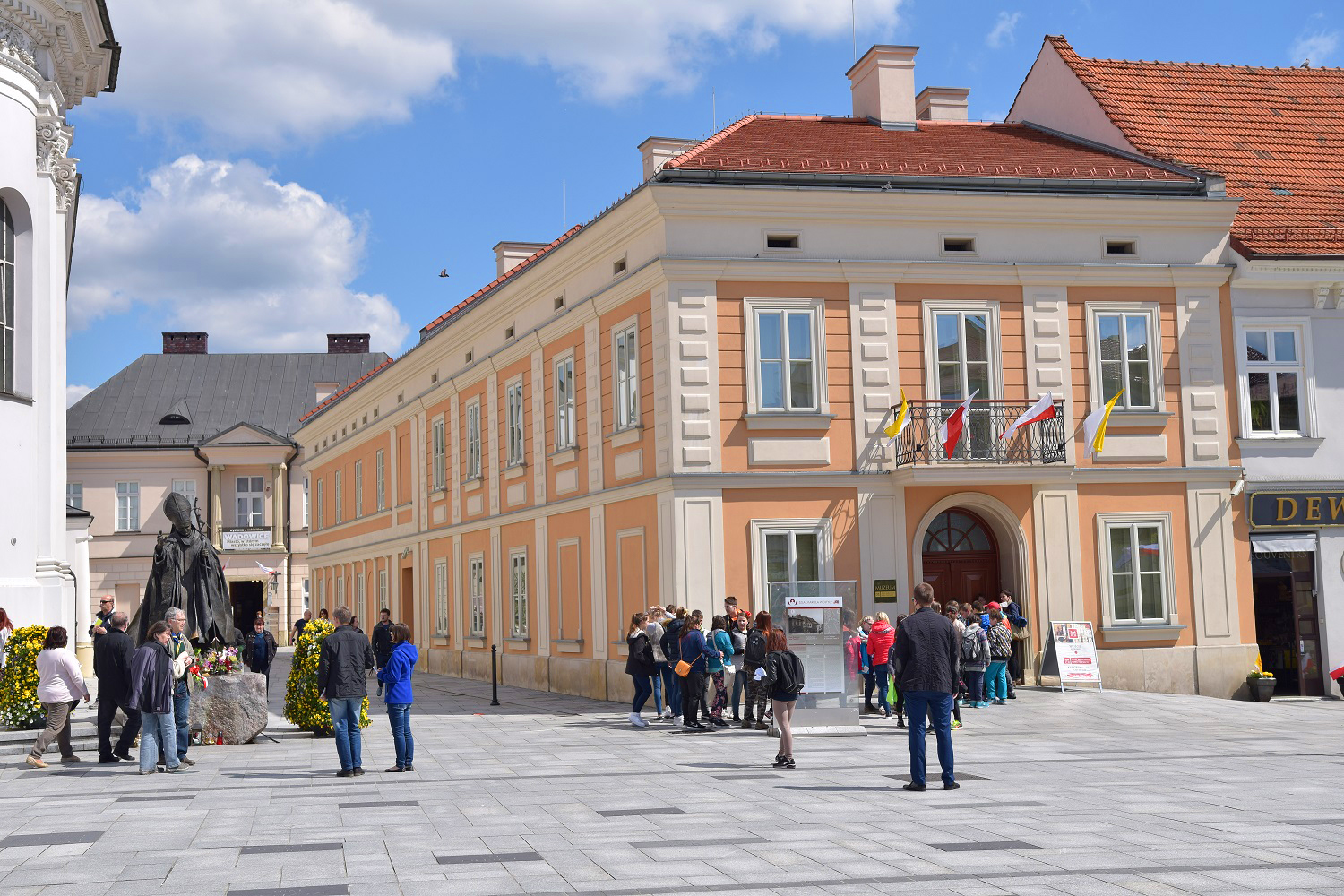
Holy Father John Paul II Family Home

- Days of Wadowice (Dni Wadowic) are held every May–June. The feast starts every 18 May to commemorate the birth of Karol Wojtyła.
- Museum of the Holy Father Family Home in the family home of Pope John Paul II collects objects that belonged to Karol Wojtyła and his family.
- Parochial church – the Virgin Mary's Offertory minor basilica–15th century, rebuilt in the 18th century.
- Kościelna 4 street, an 18th-century house.
- Neo-Classical "Mikołaj" manor – 19th century, named after the mayor Mikołaj Komorowski.
- Municipal Museum of Marcin Wadowita.
- Pope John Paul II square with 19th-century burgher houses.
- Monument to Emil Zegadłowicz, a writer who described the area of Wadowice in many of his books.

== Religion ==
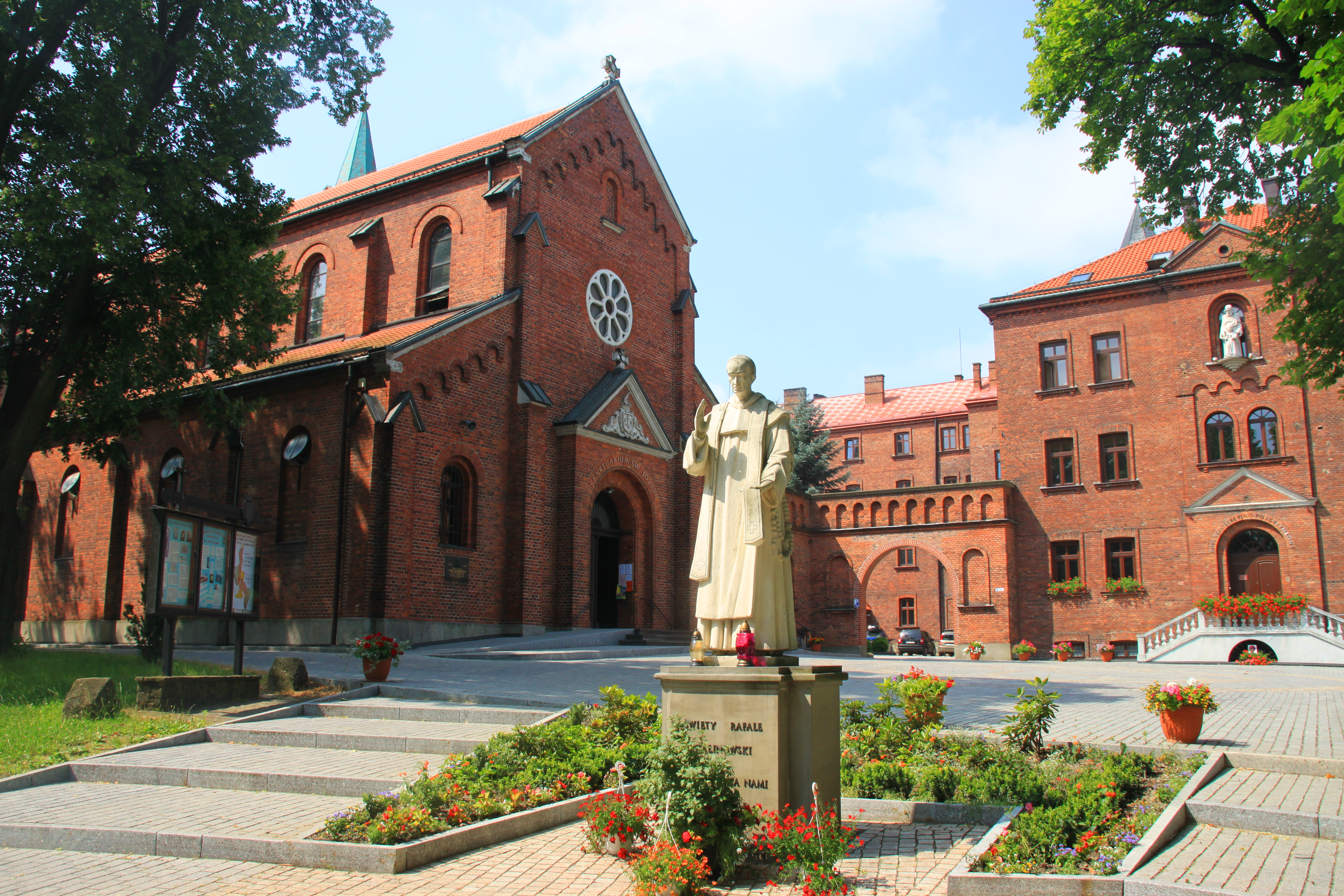
Saint Joseph church and Monastery of Discalced Carmelites

- Roman Catholicism (Basilica)
- Jehovah's Witnesses (Kingdom Hall)

== Sport ==
The town's most notable sports club is Skawa Wadowice with football, basketball, volleyball and tennis teams. Founded in 1907, it is one of the oldest sports clubs in the region.

== Twin towns – sister cities ==
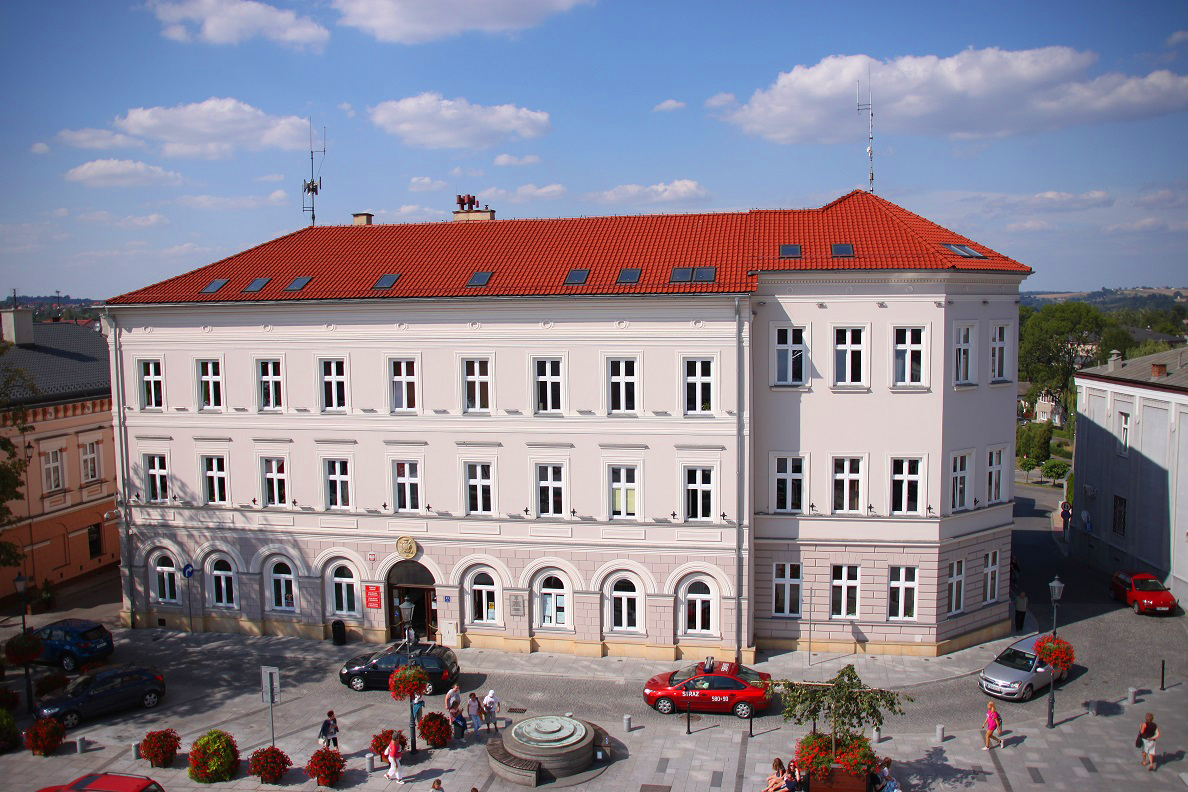
Town hall

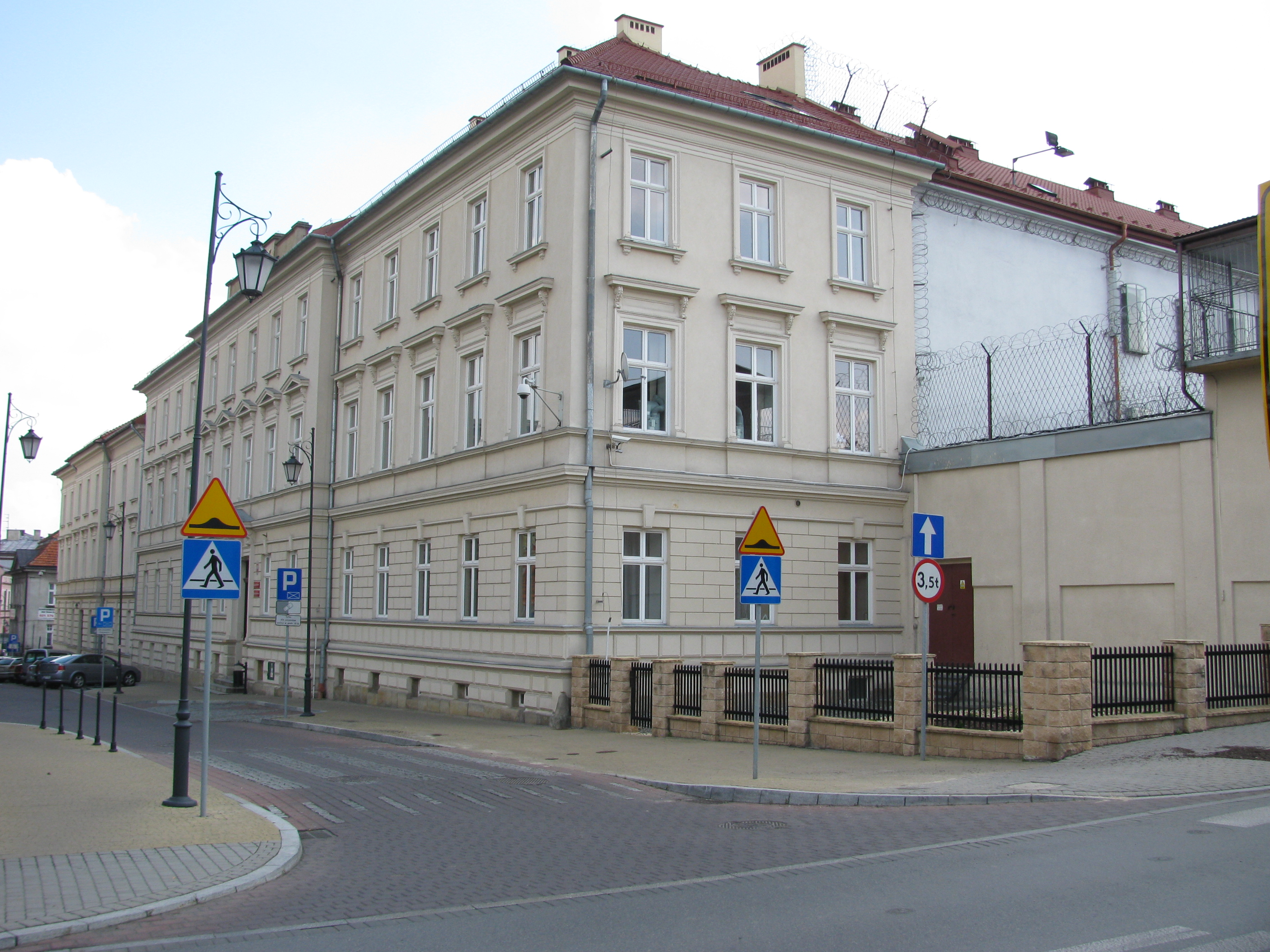
County Court

Wadowice is twinned with:

- San Giovanni Rotondo in Italy (since 2006)
- (Italy) Assisi (since 2012)
- Pietrelcina in Italy (since 2006)
- Carpineto Romano in Italy
- Sona in Italy
- Canale d'Agordo in Italy (since 2010)
- Marktl in Germany (birthplace of Pope Benedict XVI)

== Notable people ==
- Marcin Wadowita (1567–1641), Polish theologian, philosopher and deacon of the Kraków Academy
- Ignacy Krieger (1817-1889), Polish photographer born in Wadowice district
- Godwin von Brumowski (1889–1936), highest scoring Austro-Hungarian World War I fighter ace
- Louis Hollander (1893–1980) US labor union leader
- Raphael Kalinowski (b. 1835, Vilna; d. 1906, Wadowice), founder of Wadowice college, seminary, church, monastery, and convent
- Berta Lask (1878–1967), German author
- Ada Sari (1886–1968), Polish opera singer, actress
- Bolesław Talago (1886-1960), publisher and surveyor
- Karol Wojtyła (1920–2005), Pope Saint John Paul II
- Anna Plichta (born 1992), racing cyclist
