= Holy Father John Paul II Family Home, Wadowice =

Coordinates: 49.8833°N 19.4938°E

Holy Father John Paul II Family Home in Wadowice
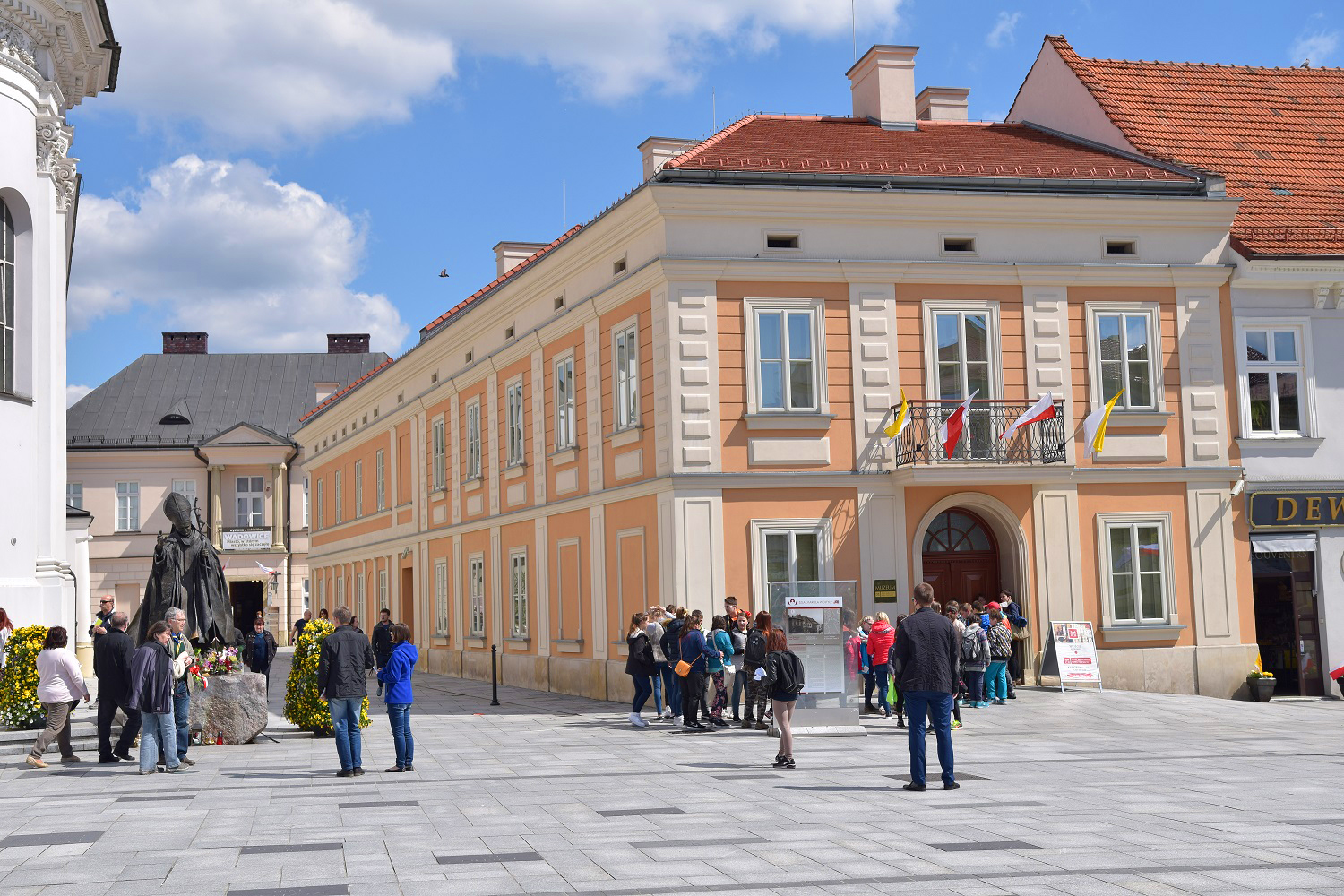
- Holy Father John Paul II Family Home in Wadowice
- Established: 18 May 1984
- Director: Magdalena Strzelecka CSFN
- Website: Holy Father John Paul II Family Home (in English)

The Holy Father John Paul II Family Home in Wadowice, Poland was the family home and birthplace of Karol Józef Wojtyła, who was elected Pope John Paul II in 1978, and canonised after his death. Its address is 7 Kościelna Street, Wadowice, in southern Poland. It is described on the Wadowice website as "The family home of Pope John Paul II - Papal Museum" and "Museum of John Paul II in Wadowice".

== History ==
It has been a historic house museum since 1984; it preserves its original structure and houses a collection of objects that belonged to the Wojtyła family. The museum also commemorates Wojtyła's life and his work in Poland until he left Kraków for the Vatican in 1978.

In 1919 Wojtyła's family rented two rooms with a kitchen on the first floor. Karol Wojtyła was born in this apartment on 18 May 1920. After his mother's death on 13 April 1929, Karol and his father occupied only one smaller room and the kitchen.

Wojtyła lived in this house until 1938, when he moved with his father to Kraków and enrolled at Jagiellonian University.

== Gallery ==
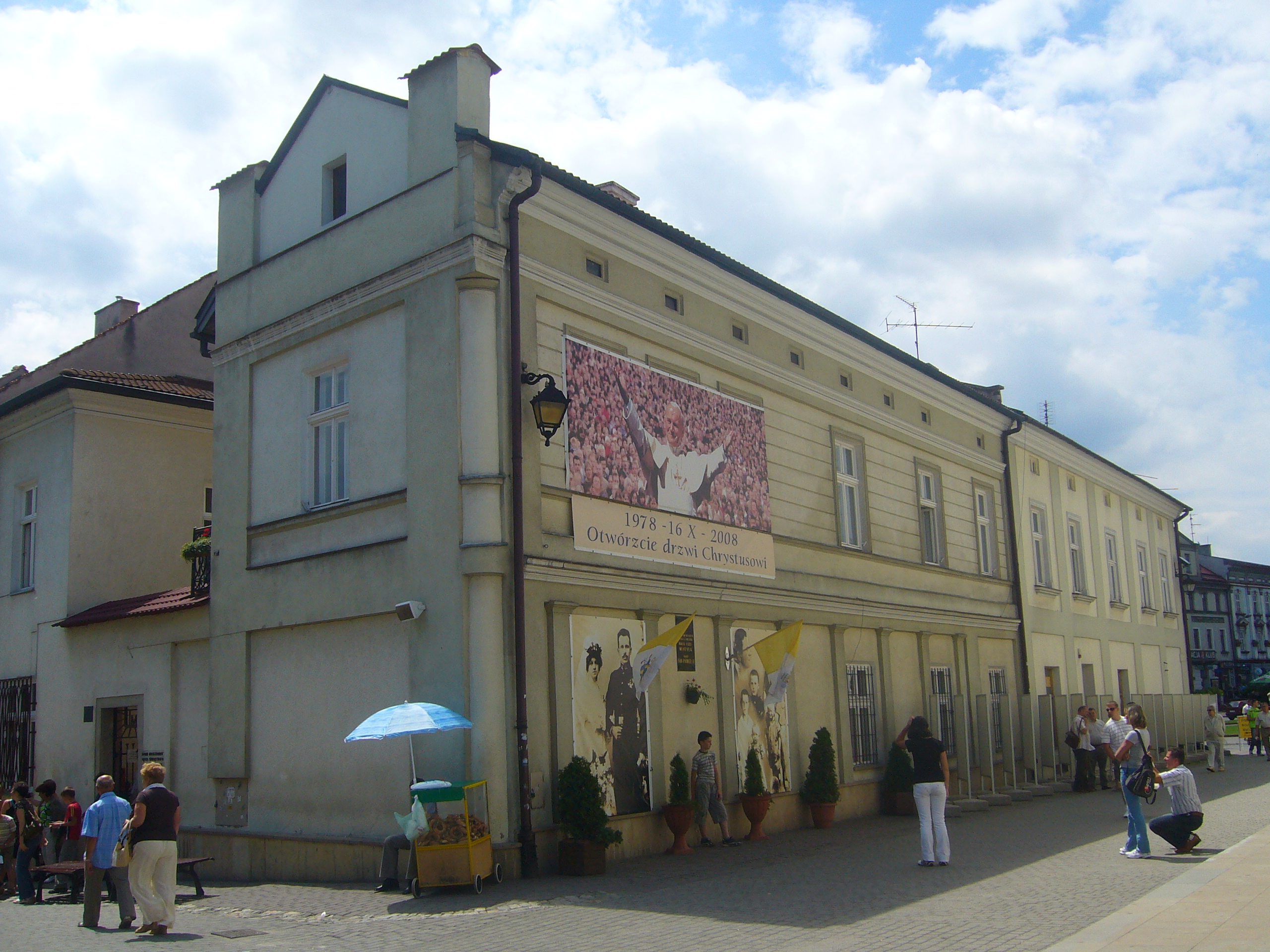
Holy Father John Paul II Family Home

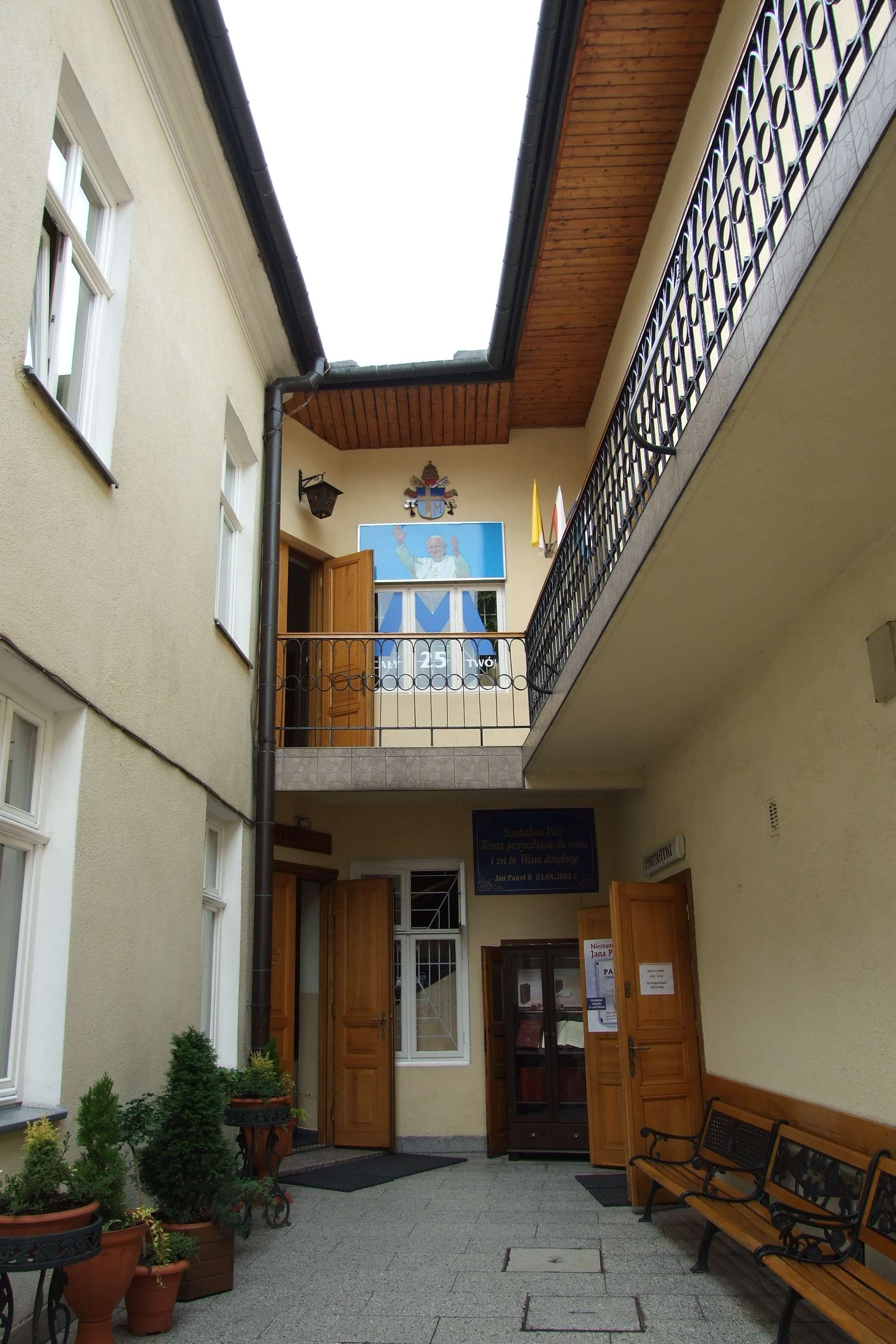
Courtyard within the family home

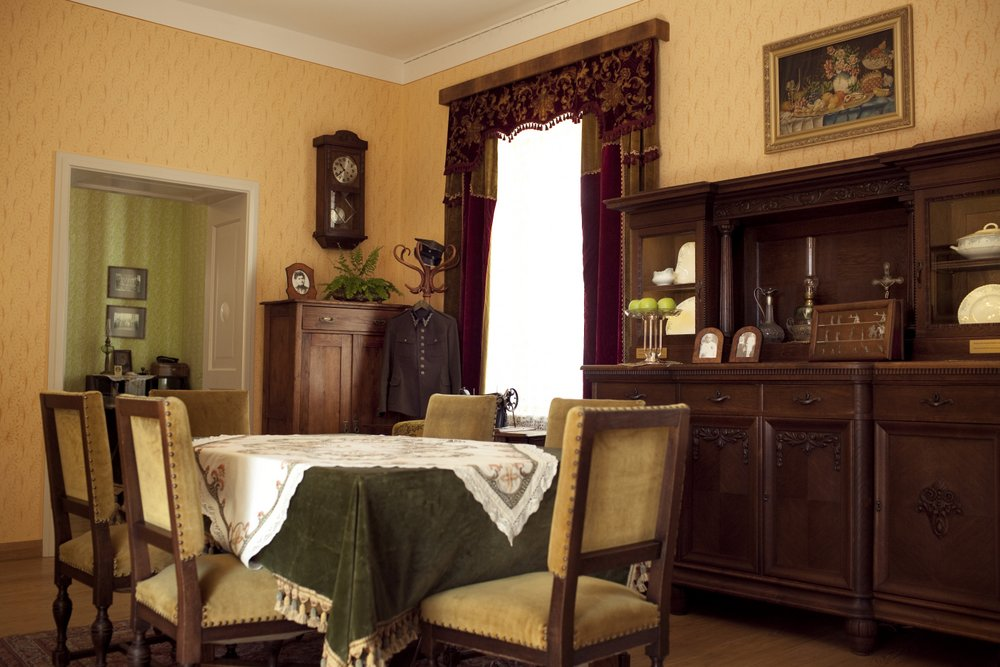
The dining room

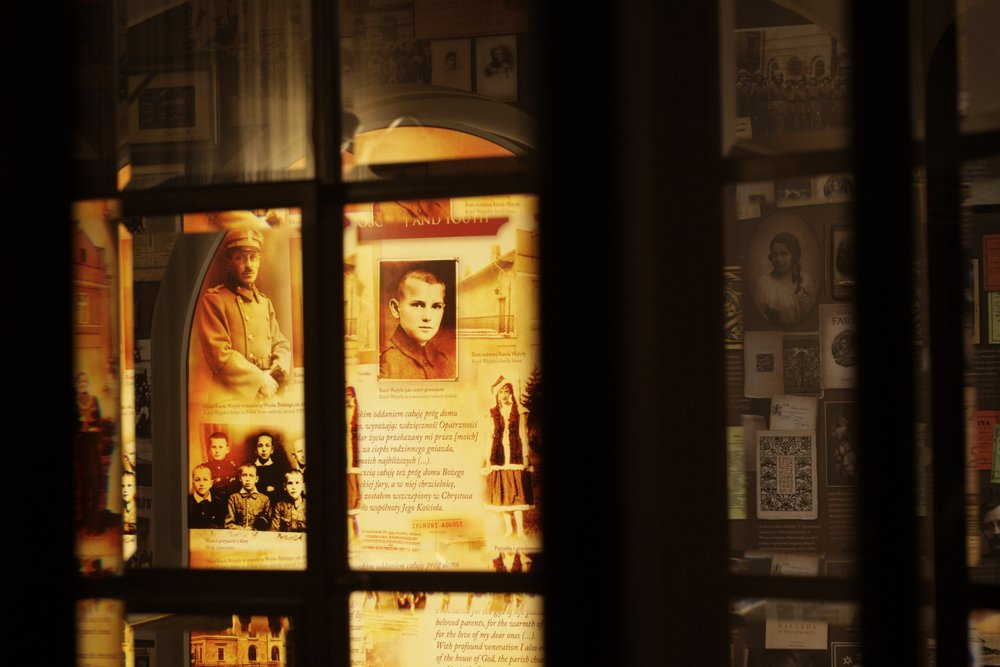
Part of the permanent exhibition

== See also ==
- List of places named after Pope John Paul II
