= Marcin Wadowita =

Polish professor and theologian (1536–1612)

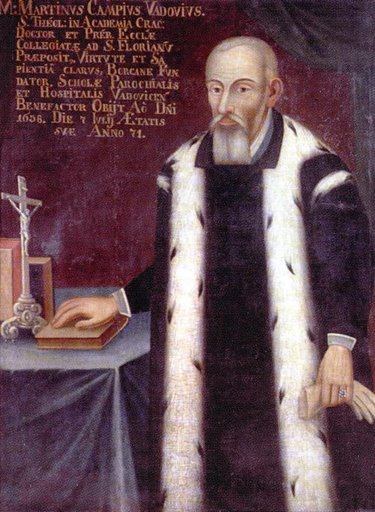
- Marcin Wadowita
- Born: 1567; Wadowice, Poland
- Died: 27 January 1641 (aged 73–74)
- Title: Professor and Chancellor of Jagiellonian University

Marcin Wadowita (Polish pronunciation: [ˈmart͡ɕin vadɔˈvita]; 1567 – 27 January 1641) also known as Wadovius or Campius, was a Polish priest, theologian, professor, and the Deputy Chancellor of Jagiellonian University in Kraków; under his tenure the university is said to have prospered.

He was born in Wadowice, where he later funded several buildings. He studied at the Jagiellonian University and abroad – in Rome.

== Publications ==
He wrote and published in Kraków ten Latin theological treatises:

1. "Qvaestio De Incarnatione" (Treatise on the Incarnation), 1603
2. "Qvaestio De Christi Merito" (Treatise on the Merits of Christ"), 1604;
3. "Qvaestio De Divina Volvntate Et Radice Continentiae" (Treatise on the Divine Will and the Root of Continence"), 1608;"
4. Qvaestio De Hypostasi Aeternae, Foelicitatis, Primoqve Medio Salvtis, Interno Actv Fidei "(Treatise on the First Way of Eternal Union, Happiness, and Salvation: The Internal Act of Faith"), 1616;
5. "Disputatio theologica" (Theological Reflections), 1620,
6. "Qvaestio merito de Christi Domini" (Treatise on the Merits of Christ the Lord), 1620;
7. "Disputatio de evidentia misterii" (Reflections on Proof of the Mystery), 1622;
8. Eucharistiae Sacramento (Treatise of divine sacrament of the Eucharist), 1622,
9. "Qvaestio De Invenienda, Cognoscenda, discernenda vera Christi Ecclesia in Terris" (Treatise on the obligation search of knowledge, distinguishing the true Church of Christ on earth), 1636;
10. "Qvaestio De Visione Beata" (Treatise on the Beatific Vision), 1638
