= Bolesław Talago =

Polish publisher

Bolesław Talago (Balys Talago) (15 April 1886 in Wadowice - 3 September 1960 in Warsaw), was a Polish surveyor, and the publisher of one of the first radio journals in Poland.

He was the son of Józef and Teofila Kulikowska. From February 1925, he published an illustrated radio bi-weekly magazine devoted to radio engineering. It was one of the first Polish magazines devoted exclusively to radio and radio technology. In February 1923, he was running a surveying company in Toruń. As a surveyor he lived and worked with his family in many cities of Pomerania and eastern Poland: Kamieniec Podolski, Toruń, Grudziądz, Grodno, Bielsk Podlaski, Vilnius.

He had two wives. With Katarzyna Talago (Sołonienko) he had four children - Boleslaw Talago (1919–1976), Bronisław (1925–1998), Halina (1927–2013) and Danuta (1934–1978).

During the Second World War, between 1942 and 1944 he worked in the Vilnius police station. In 1943, he was arrested and imprisoned in a forced labor camp in Prawieniszki, Lithuania, in connection with the execution, by the Home Army, of the Lithuanian police inspector Marian Podobasie [7]. Among the detainees were representatives of Polish intelligentsia, including scientists, teachers, lawyers, doctors, and engineers.

After the war he farmed in Łódź and from 1953 in Niechorze. He is buried in Warsaw at the Powązki Cemetery.
