= Ada Sari =

Polish opera singer and actress

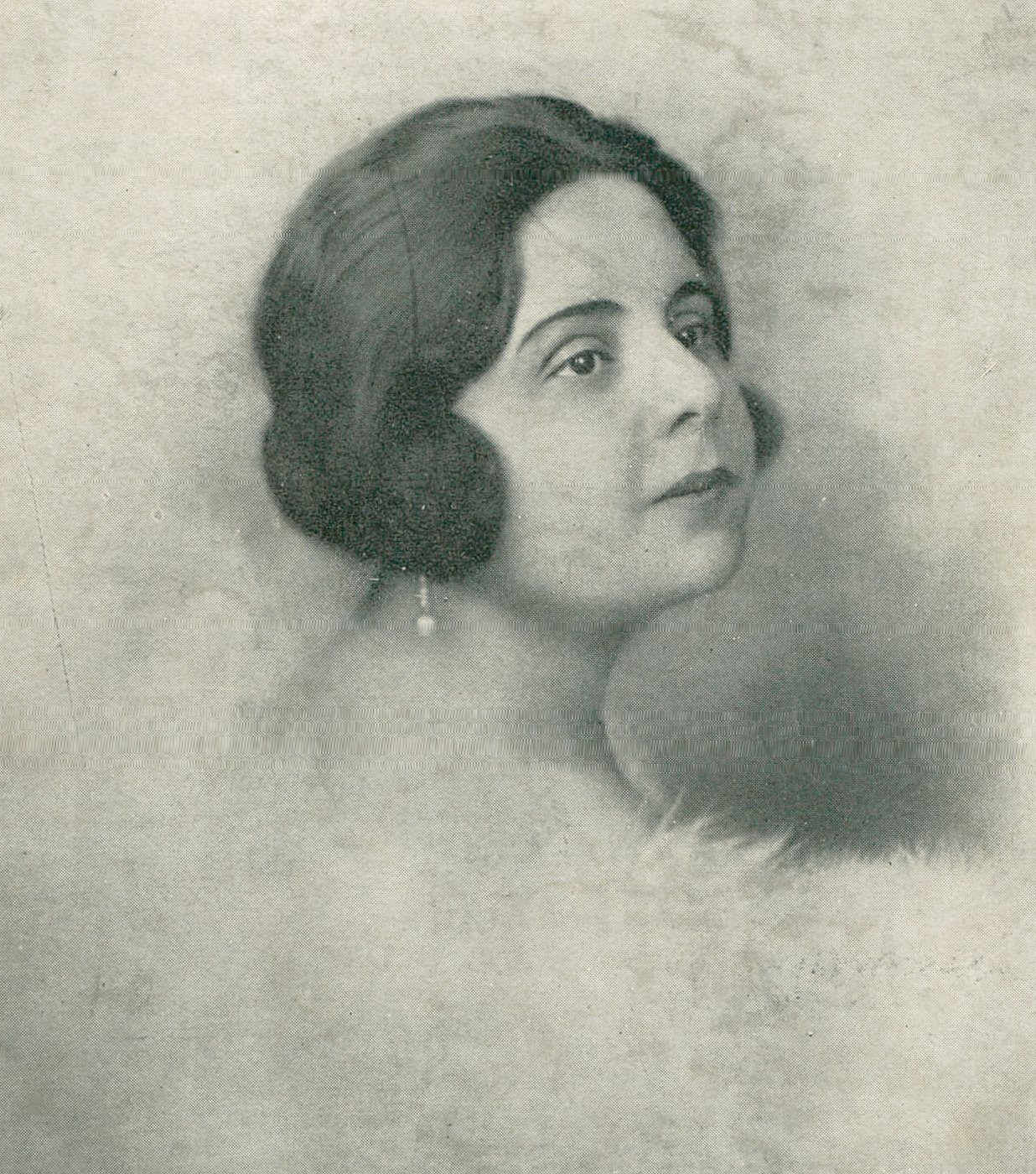
- Portrait of Ada Sari, 1909
- Born: Jadwiga Szayer; June 29, 1886; Wadowice, Austro-Hungarian Empire
- Died: July 12, 1968 (aged 82); Ciechocinek, Polish People's Republic
- Occupations: Opera singer ( dramatic coloratura soprano), actress, pedagogue

Ada Sari (29 June 1886 – 12 July 1968) was a Polish opera singer, actress, and educator. One of the leading dramatic coloratura sopranos of her generation, she possessed a large, resonant voice with a clear timbre. Her career took her to the stages of the best opera houses and concert halls in Europe during the first half of the 20th century. Her signature roles included Gilda in Rigoletto, Mimi in La bohème, Rosina in The Barber of Seville, Violetta in La traviata, and the title roles in Lakmé and Lucia di Lammermoor. She also gave lauded concert tours in North and South America.

Sari enjoyed a great deal of popularity among audiences and critics and she was dubbed "The Queen of Coloratura" and the "New Patti" by the Italian press. During her career she appeared opposite many famous singers, including Mattia Battistini, Beniamino Gigli, Aureliano Pertile, Titta Ruffo and Tito Schipa to name a just a few. She collaborated with many well known conductors like Sergei Koussevitzky, Tullio Serafin, and Arturo Toscanini. She also appeared in concert with many well-known performers, such as Fritz Kreisler, Wilhelm Backhaus, and Pablo Casals.

== Life and career ==
Born with the name Jadwiga Szayer in Wadowice, Sari was the daughter of Edward Szayer, a well-known lawyer, and his wife Franciszka née Chybińska. When she was three years old she moved with her family to Stary Sącz where her father opened a law firm and eventually served as mayor for seventeen years. After completion of her primary education, she studied music theory and singing privately in Cieszyn and Kraków. In 1905 she was admitted to a private music school in Vienna operated by Countess Pizzamano. From 1907 to 1909 she studied in Milan with Antonio Rupnick.

Sari made her professional opera debut in 1909 as Marguerite in Charles Gounod's Faust at the Teatro Nazionale in Rome. She spent the next three years appearing at major opera houses in Italy like La Scala, the Teatro Comunale di Bologna, La Fenice and the Teatro della Pergola. Between 1912 and 1914 she had major successes at the Teatro Lirico Giuseppe Verdi, the Teatro Donizetti di Bergamo, the Teatro Dal Verme, the Teatro Regio di Parma, the Teatro del Giglio, the opera house in Brescia and the Teatro di San Carlo. At the later house she was a much admired Berthe in Giacomo Meyerbeer's Le prophète and Arsena in The Gypsy Baron. She also sang Santuzza in Mascagni's Cavalleria rusticana and Nedda in Leoncavallo's Pagliacci under the batons of their respective composers in Alexandria.

In early 1914 Sari gave a highly lauded portrayal of the title heroine in Jules Massenet's Thaïs at the Great Theatre, Warsaw. She also appeared at that house as Tamara in Anton Rubinstein's The Demon with Mattia Battistini in the title role. In the spring of 1914 Sari embarked on a lengthy concert tour of Russia with a group of Italian singers which included extended stays in Moscow and Saint Petersburg for opera performances at the Mariinsky and Bolshoi Theatres. The tour, which originated in Warsaw, also stopped for performances in Lemberg, Kiev, and Kraków.

While Sari was on tour, World War I broke out and the soprano decided to accept a contract at the Vienna State Opera in the Fall of 1914 as that city was not facing any immediate military threat. She left there in the Fall of 1916 to join the roster of singers at the opera house in Lviv. After a year there she returned to the Great Theatre, Warsaw where her portrayals included Lucia, Marguerite de Valois in Les Huguenots, and Konstanze in Die Entführung aus dem Serail.

After World War I ended, Sari performed a lot in South America, especially since 1918 at the Teatro Colón in Buenos Aires. In 1921 she undertook a concert tour throughout North America, which included appearances at Carnegie Hall in New York and the Auditorium Building of Roosevelt University in Chicago. Toscanini invited her to portray the Queen of the Night in The Magic Flute for the opening of La Scala's 1923–1924 season.

During the next decade she gave a series of triumphant concert tours in Europe and North America and regularly visited Poland. In 1934 she moved back to Warsaw, where she sang frequently at the Wielki Theatre. During the Second World War she directed an underground opera studio in Warsaw, and after the war she sang with the opera companies in Wrocław and Kraków, as well as giving concerts and broadcasts. While still performing, she began to teach in 1936 and was very talented in this field, too. Many well-known singers such as Halina Mickiewiczówna de Larzac, Bogna Sokorska, Urszula Trawińska-Moroz, Maria Foltyn graduated from her class.

== Death ==
She retired from the stage in 1947 then was entirely devoted to teaching for many years. She died of heart attack at the age of 82 during her stay in a sanatorium in Ciechocinek in 1968.

== Remembrance ==
Since 1985, the Ada Sari International Vocal Artistry Festival and Competition has been held annually in the town of Nowy Sącz, Lesser Poland Voivodeship, in honour of the musical legacy of Ada Sari. It is organized by the SOKÓŁ Lesser Poland Cultural Centre (Polish: Małopolskie Centrum Kultury SOKÓŁ). The current director of the festival is Małgorzata Walewska, who assumed this position in 2014.

== See also ==
- List of Poles
- Polish opera
- Aleksandra Kurzak
- Małgorzata Walewska

== Sources ==
- Sari, Biography at operissimo.com (in German)
