= Tinker =

Wandering tinsmith

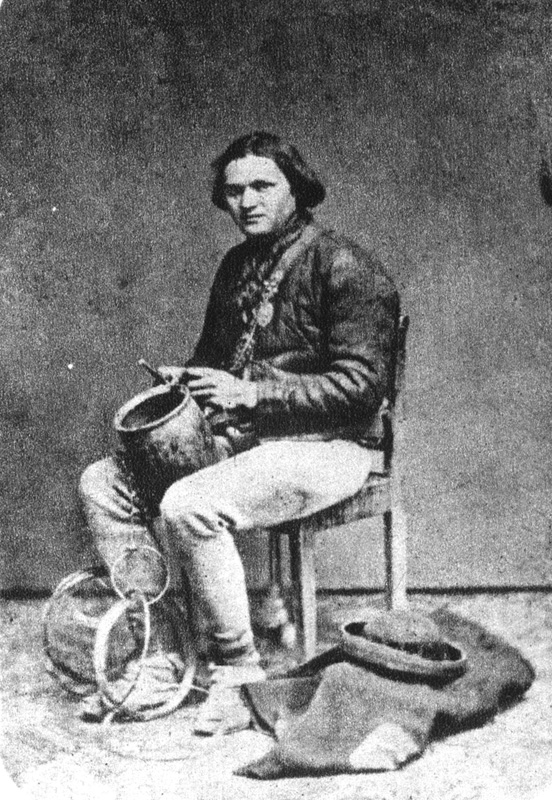
A photograph of a tinker by Ignacy Krieger, nineteenth century

Tinker or tinkerer is an archaic term for an itinerant tinsmith who mends household utensils.

== Description ==
The Tinker by Alphonse Legros, 1874

Tinker for metal-worker is attested from the thirteenth century as tyckner or tinkler. Some travelling groups and Romani people specialised in the trade, and the name was particularly associated with indigenous Irish Travellers and Scottish Highland Travellers – the name of whose language Beurla Reagaird means "metalworkers". However, this use is considered offensive.

The term "tinker", in British English, may refer to a mischievous child.

== "Tinker's dam" or "damn" and "tinker's curse" ==
Both phrases tinker's damn and tinker's curse can be applied to something considered insignificant. An example: "I don't give a tinker's curse what the doctor thinks", sometimes shortened to, "I don't give a tinker's about the doctor."

A tinker's dam is also reportedly a temporary patch to retain solder when repairing a hole in a metal vessel, such as a pot or a pan. It was used by tinkers and was usually made of mud or clay, or sometimes other materials at hand, such as wet paper or dough. The material was built up around the outside of the hole, so as to plug it. Molten solder was then poured on the inside of the hole. The solder cooled and solidified against the dam and bonded with the metal wall. The dam was then brushed away. The remaining solder was then rasped and smoothed down by the tinker.

In the Practical Dictionary of Mechanics of 1877, Edward Knight gives this definition: "Tinker's-dam: a wall of dough raised around a place which a plumber desires to flood with a coat of solder. The material can be but once used; being consequently thrown away as worthless".

It is thought that the use of "tinker's dam" as something worthless may have evolved into the phrase "tinker's curse". Although tinker's curse is attested in 1824, which was thought to be earlier than tinker's dam, "tinkers damn" is attested in 1823. An alternative derivation is that a tinker's curse or cuss was considered of little significance, possibly because tinkers (who worked with their hands near hot metal) were reputed to swear (curse) habitually.

When working with copper, tin, gold, or other low-melting-point metals, the tinker would construct a charcoal furnace out of bricks and mud. At the bottom, he would leave a hole for the molten metal to pour out into a trough that led to a casting or a depression for an ingot. The hole was covered with a temporary "dam" which would be broken when the liquid metal had puddled at the bottom of the furnace. The function of the blockage coined the term "tinker's dam" as being something that lasted only temporarily, as it was to be destroyed or made useless in the very near future.

== See also ==
- Mercheros
- Tinker, Tailor; a traditional children's counting game
