= Ignacy Krieger =

Polish photographer

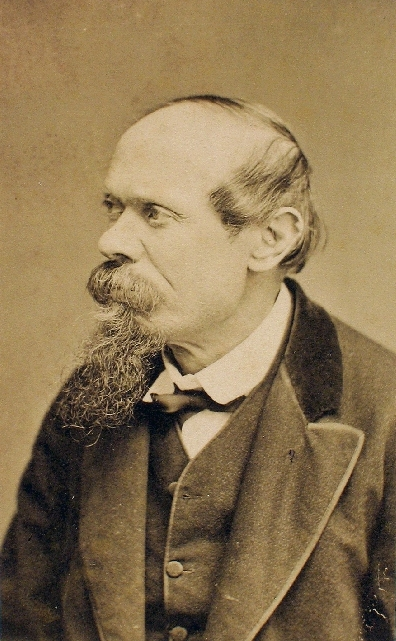
- Born: 1817 or 1820; Mikołaj manor, Wadowice district
- Died: 17 June 1889; Kraków, Poland
- Resting place: Jewish cemetery in Kraków
- Occupation: Photographer

Ignacy Krieger (1817/1820 – 17 June 1889) was a Polish photographer. He was the owner of a photo studio documenting the city of Kraków and its monuments.

== Life and work ==
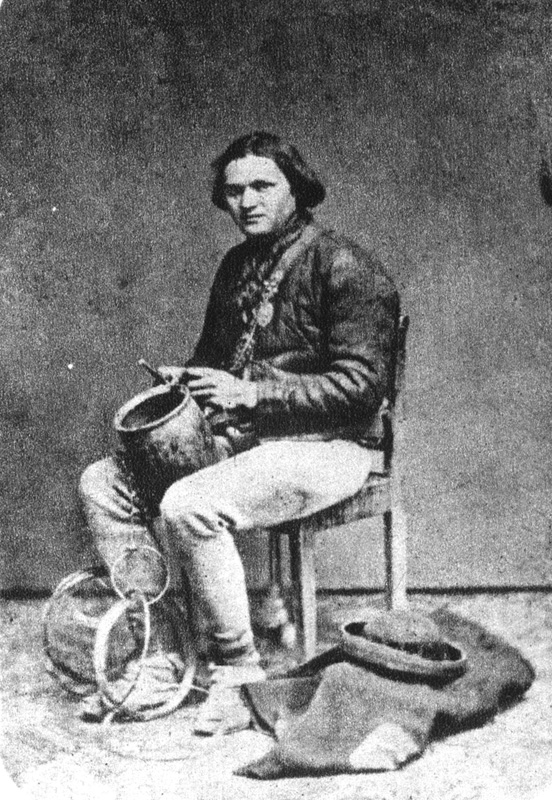
A photograph of a tinker by Krieger.

Krieger was born in 1817 or 1820 in the Mikołaj manor, Wadowice district (currently in the city of Wadowice). It is not known where and with whom he studied photography.

In 1860, after returning from a foreign trip, during which he improved his skills, he moved to Kraków and established a studio. It was located in the yard of A. Schwarz's house at ul. Grodzka 88 (currently 13). In May of the same year, in "Czas" he posted an advertisement saying that he was making portraits, medallions, group photos, "landscape views" and photos of buildings. As a photographer, he quickly gained a high position in the city. Approx. In 1864 he also had a branch of the plant in Tarnów.

After returning from a second trip abroad in 1865, the atelier moved to a tenement house at the corner of the Main Square and ul. st. Jana (then Rynek Główny 37, now 42).

He died in Kraków on 17 June 1889 and was buried in the new Jewish cemetery in Kraków.

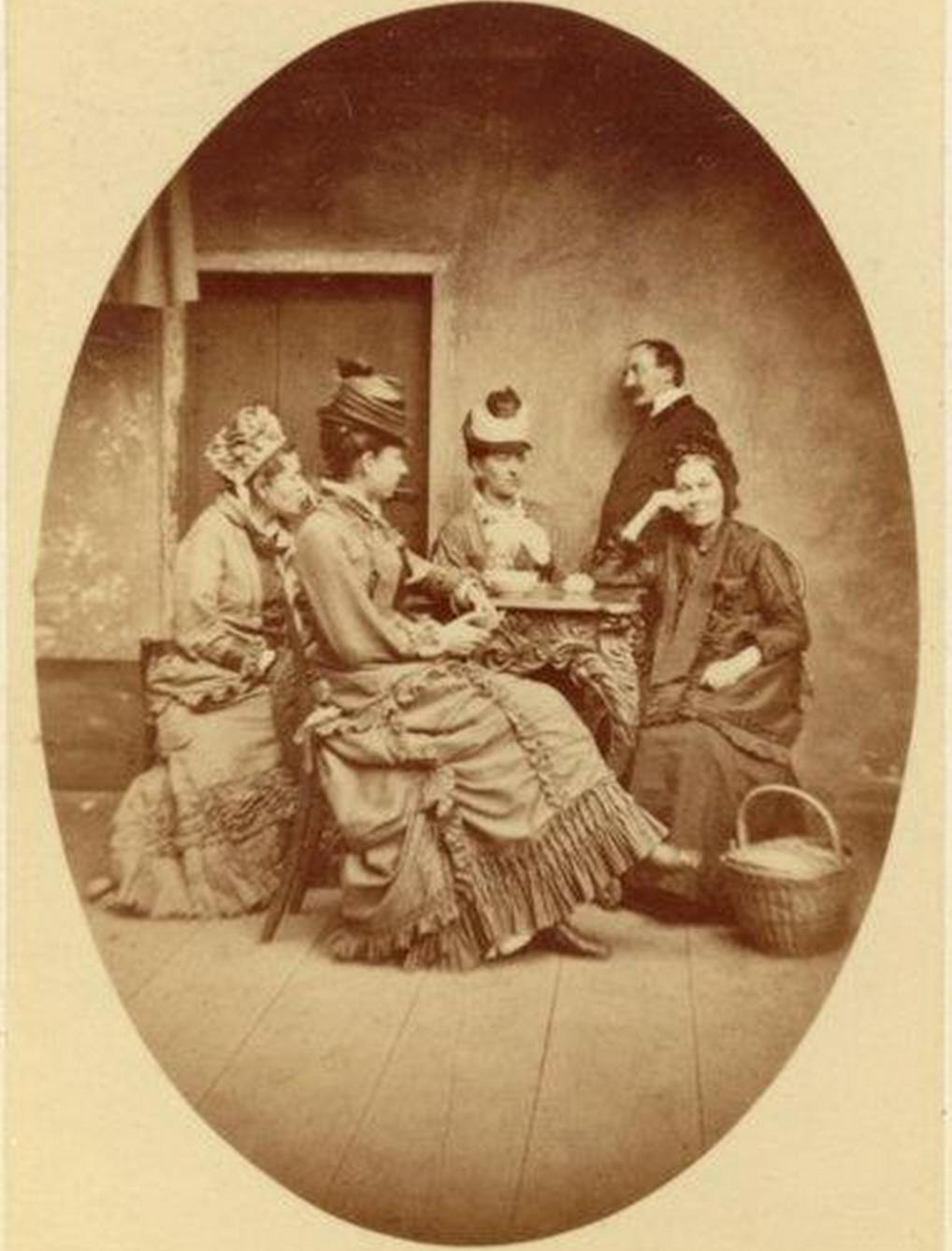
1880: Part of the Krieger family—mother Hanna, brother Natan, and three sisters

== Technique ==
Initially, Krieger used the collodion technique, which he replaced with bromo-gelatin after the mid-1880s. However, the wet collodion plate did not disappear completely from Krieger's factory and was used even after 1890 in reproduction photography.
