= Paul (given name) =

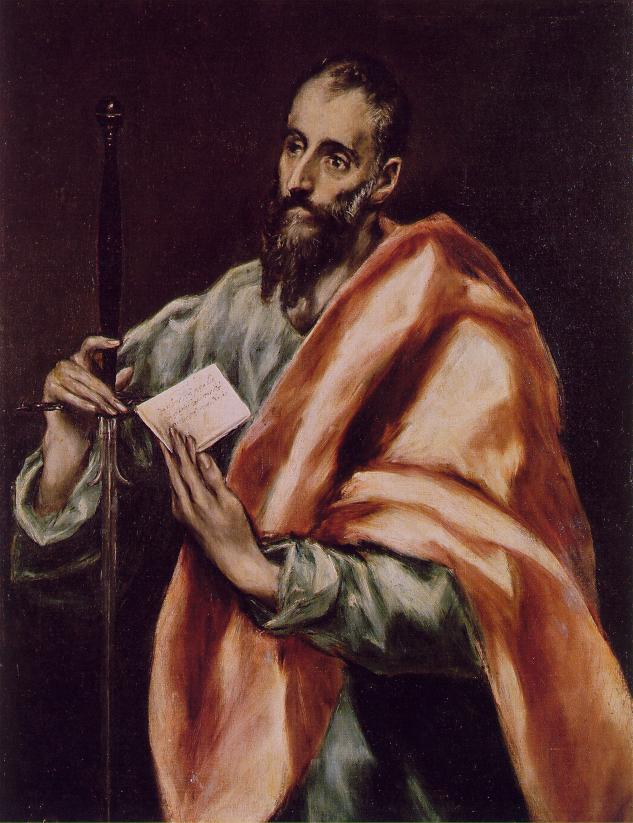
- Paul the Apostle by El Greco
- Pronunciation: English: /pɔːl/ PAWL; French: [pɔl] German: [paʊl] Dutch: [pʌul]
- Gender: Male
- Name day: June 29

Origin
- Language: Latin
- Origin: Paulus, Paullus
- Meaning: "small" or "humble"
- Region of origin: Ancient Rome in the Italian Peninsula

Other names
- Related names: Paulus, Pauli, Paulo, Paolo, Pablo, Paavo, Pavel, Paulin

Paul is an English as well as Dutch, French and German masculine given name. The Roman and subsequently Christian derived name and its variations can also be a surname.

== Origin and diffusion ==
The name has existed since Roman times. It derives from the Roman family name Paulus or Paullus, from the Latin adjective meaning "small", "humble", "least" or "little". During the Classical Age it was used to distinguish the minor of two people of the same family bearing the same name. The Roman patrician family of the Gens Aemilia included such prominent persons as Lucius Aemilius Paullus, Lucius Aemilius Paullus Macedonicus, Lucius Aemilius Lepidus Paullus, Tertia Aemilia Paulla (the wife of Scipio Africanus), and Sergius Paulus.

Its prevalence in nations with a Christian heritage is primarily due to its attachment to Saint Paul the Apostle, whose Greek name was Παῦλος, Paûlos, a transliteration from the Latin, also carrying the "modest" meaning of this name. The name Paul is common, with variations, in all Christian nations' languages.

Paul's popularity has varied. In the United States, the 1990 census shows it ranked the 13th most common (male) name; however, Social Security Administration data shows Paul in the top 20 given names in 1968, after which it began a steady decline.

The feminine versions are Paula, Pauline, Paulina, and Paulette.

== Other languages ==
- Latin: Paulus
- Arabic: بولس (Būlus, in the Bible), بولص (Būluṣ)
- Aragonese: Pavlo
- Basque: Paulo
- Belarusian: Павeл (Paveł), Паўлюк (Paŭĺuk), Паўлюсь (Paŭĺuś)
- Biblical Greek: Paulos or Pavlos
- Biblical Latin: Paulus
- Bosnian: Pavao
- Bulgarian: Павел (Pavel)
- Catalan: Pau
- Croatian: Pavao
- Czech: Pavel
- Danish: Poul, Povl, Palle
- Dutch: Paul, Paulus, Pauwel
- Esperanto: Paŭlo, Paĉjo
- Estonian: Paul, Paavel, Paavo
- Finnish: Paavali, Paavo, Pauli
- French: Paul, Pol, Paulin
- Galician: Paulo
- German: Paul
- Hawaiian: Paulo
- Hebrew: פאולוס (Paulus – only used in Biblical context))
- Hungarian: Pál (Nicknames: Pali, Palika, Paja, Pajus, Pajó, Palcsi, Palcsika, Pálka, Palkó, Pálocska)
- Icelandic: Páll
- Irish: Pól
- Italian: Paolo, Paolino
- Latin: Paulus
- Latvian: Pauls, Pāvils
- Lithuanian: Paulas, Paulius, Povilas
- Norwegian: Paul, Pål
- Polish: Paweł
- Portuguese: Paulo, Paulino, Paulinho, Pavão (archaic)
- Romanian: Paul, Pavel
- Russian: Павел (Pavel)
- Serbian: Павле (Pavle)
- Slovak: Pavol
- Slovene: Pavel
- Spanish: Pablo, Paulino, Paulo
- Swedish: Paul, Pål
- Ukrainian: Павло (Pavlo)

== Notable examples ==
=== Mononym ===
- Paul I (disambiguation)
- Paul II (disambiguation)
- Patriarch Paul (disambiguation)
- Pope Paul (disambiguation)
- Saint Paul (disambiguation)

Listed chronologically

- Paul the Apostle (c. 5–c. 64/65), also known as Saul of Tarsus or Saint Paul, early Christian missionary and writer
- Paul (jurist), also called Julius Paulus, praetorian prefect
- Paul (Nestorian patriarch), briefly Patriarch of the Church of the East in 539
- Paul (bishop of Mérida), the metropolitan bishop of Mérida in the mid sixth century (fl. 540s/550s)
- Paul (father of Maurice) (died 593), father of Byzantine Emperor. Maurice and head of the Byzantine Senate
- Paul of Aegina (625–690), Greek surgeon
- Paul (exarch), Exarch of Ravenna from 723 to 727
- Paul the Deacon (c. 720–c. 799), Italian Benedictine monk
- Paul of Latrus (died c. 956), Greek hermit
- Paul, son of Peter, voivode of Transylvania between 1221 and 1222
- Paul, Latin Patriarch of Constantinople (died 1371)
- Paul (Meletiev) (1880–1962), Catholic bishop
- Paul of Greece (1901–1964), King of Greece
- Paul (Ponomaryov) (born 1952), emeritus Metropolitan of Minsk and Slutsk, Patriarchal Exarch of All Belarus and leader of the Belarusian Orthodox Church

=== A ===
- Paul Abbate, American law enforcement officer
- Paul Abberley (born 1959), chief executive of Charles Stanley Group
- Paul Abbott (disambiguation), several people
- Paul Abrahamian, American reality television personality and clothing designer
- Paul Ackerman (1908–1977), American music journalist
- Paul Ackford (born 1958), English former rugby union international player
- Paul Adado (born 1983), Togolese footballer
- Paul Adelstein (born 1969), American actor and writer
- Paul Adams (disambiguation), several people
- Paul Adamson, British editor and the chairman of Forum Europe and founder of E!Sharp
- Paul Adelstein (born 1969), American actor
- Paul Adomites, baseball and oil historian, author and Society for American Baseball Research
- Paul Affleck (born 1966), Welsh professional golfer
- Paul Agostino (born 1975), Australian former professional footballer
- Paul Ahmarani (born 1972), Canadian actor
- Paul Ainslie (born 1967), Canadian city councillor
- Paul W. Airey (1923–2009), United States Air Force airman, first Chief Master Sergeant of the Air Force
- Paul Aizley (1936–2023), American politician
- Paul Ajlouny (born 1933), Palestinian-American publisher and businessman
- Paul Akers, American author and businessman
- Paul Alan (born 1971), American Contemporary Christian music artist and songwriter
- Paul Alexander (disambiguation), several people
- Paul Alfonsi (1908–1989), Wisconsin politician
- Paul Alford, Canadian football guard and running back
- Paul Allen (disambiguation), several people
- Paul Alter (1922–2011), American television director
- Paul Ambros (1934–2015), German ice hockey player
- Paul Ambrose (1868–1941), Canadian organist, conductor, composer, and music educator
- Paul America (1944–1982), American actor
- Paul Thomas Anderson (born 1970), American film director and screenwriter
- Paul W. S. Anderson (born 1965), English filmmaker
- Paul Y. Anderson (1893–1938), American journalist
- Paul Andrea (born 1941), Canadian former ice hockey right winger
- Paul Martin Andrews (born 1959), American rape survivor
- Paul Angelis (1943–2009), English actor and writer
- Paul Anka (born 1941), Canadian singer and songwriter
- Paul Anlauf (died 1931), German murder victim
- Paul Annacone (born 1963), American former touring professional tennis player and current tennis coach
- Paul Anspach (1882–1991), Belgian épée and foil fencer, two-time Olympic champion
- Paul Anthony (born 1955), Welsh senior executive
- Paul Anthony (basketball) (1924–1993), American professional basketball player
- Paul Antonelli (born 1959), American composer, musician, music director, and music supervisor
- Paul S. Appelbaum (born 1951), American psychiatrist
- Paul Arcand (born 1960), Canadian radio host
- Paul Ardaji, American film producer
- Paul Arizin (1928–2006), American professional basketball player
- Paul Armentano, American cannabis activist
- Paul Arnold (disambiguation), several people
- Paul Aron (born 2004), Estonian racing driver
- Paul Ash (1891–1958), German orchestra leader
- Paul Acheampong Cofie Atuahene (1923–????), Ghanaian politician
- Paul Aurelian, 6th-century Welshman who became first bishop of the See of Léon
- Paul Aussaresses (1918–2013), French Army general
- Paul Auster (1947–2024), American writer and film director
- Paul Atcheson (born 1973), Welsh former international rugby league footballer
- Paul Atkins (cinematographer), American cinematographer and director
- Paul Atkinson (guitarist) (1946–2004), British guitarist and record company executive
- Paul Avrich (1931–2006), American historian
- Paul Ayer (politician), American politician
- Paul Azinger (born 1960), American golfer and TV golf analyst

=== B ===
- Paul Baade (born 1940), Democratic member
- Paul W. Baade (1889–1959), United States Army officer
- Paul Babeu (born 1969), American law enforcement officer, politician and member of the Republican Party
- Paul Backmund (born 1991), German politician
- Paul Bucha (1943–2024), American Vietnam War veteran
- Paul Bacon (disambiguation), several people
- Paul Badré (1906–2000), French aircraft pilot and engineer
- Paul Badura-Skoda (1927–2019), Austrian pianist
- Paul Baier (born 1985), American former professional ice hockey defenseman
- Paul Baillargeon (born 1943), Canadian composer
- Paul Baillargeon (1928–1997), Canadian professional wrestler
- Paul Bailey, several people
- Paul Bales, American director, screenwriter, and producer
- Paul Balmer (born 1970), Swiss mathematician
- Paul Baloche (born 1962), American Christian music artist, worship leader, and singer-songwriter
- Paul Bamba (1989–2024), Puerto Rican boxer
- Paul Barnard (politician), American politician
- Paul Barbarin (1899–1969), American jazz drummer
- Paul Jean Joseph Barbarin (1855–1931), French mathematician
- Paul Barber, several people
- Paul Barlow, Australian former rules footballer
- Paul Barnes (disambiguation), several people
- Paul Barrere (1948–2019), American musician
- Paul Barresi (born 1949), American actor, movie director, and media personality
- Paul Bartel (1938–2000), American actor, writer and director
- Paul Bartlett (disambiguation), several people
- Paul Barwick (born 1946), American former LGBT rights activist
- Paul Bates (cricketer) (born 1974), English cricketer
- Paul L. Bates (1908–1995), United States Army officer
- Paul Bateson (1940–2012), American former radiographer, convicted murderer, and suspected serial killer
- Paul Batista (born 1948), American television personality, novelist and trial lawyer
- Paul Baum (artist) (1859–1932), German landscape painter
- Paul Baum (mathematician) (born 1936), American mathematician
- Paul Bazely (born 1968), English actor
- Paul Bearer (1954–2013), American professional wrestling manager and licensed funeral director
- Paul André Beaulieu (1904–2007), Canadian diplomat
- Paul Beeston (born 1945), Canadian former professional baseball executive
- DJ Paul (born 1977), American DJ, rapper, and producer
- Paul Beisman (died 1958), American theater manager
- Paul Murray Bellan, Canadian-American physicist
- Paul Bellini (born 1959), Canadian comedy writer and television actor
- Paul Benedict (1938–2008), American actor
- Paul K. Benedict (1912–1997), American anthropologist, mental health professional, and linguist
- Paul Ben-Haim (1897–1984), Israeli composer
- Paul Benjamin (1938–2019), American actor and playwright
- Paul G. Bens Jr. (born 1964), American writer and former independent film and television casting director
- Paul Ben-Victor (born 1965), American actor
- Paul Berch, New Hampshire lawyer and politician
- Paul Berezney (1915–1990), American football player
- Paul Berg (disambiguation), several people
- Paul Bergé (1881–1970), American symphony conductor
- Paul Bern (1889–1932), German-born American film director, screenwriter, and producer
- Paul Bernardo (born 1964), Canadian serial killer and rapist
- Paul Berthon (1872–1910), French artist
- Paul Émile Berton (1846–1909), French landscape painter
- Paul Bertrand (1879–1944), French paleobotanist
- Paul Bettany (born 1971), English actor
- Paul D. Bevis (1884–1976), American politician, member of the Florida House of Representatives
- Paul Bhagwandas (1950–1996), Suriname battalion commander
- Paul Bhattacharjee (1960–c.2013), British actor
- Paul Bie-Eyene, Gabonese diplomat
- Paul Bigsby (1899–1968), American inventor, designer, and pioneer
- Paul Bilzerian (born 1950), American businessman
- Paul Binder (born 1942), American founder, founding artistic director and former ringmaster of the Big Apple Circus
- Paul Birnbaum (born 1967), American drummer
- Paul Bissonnette (born 1985), Canadian former professional ice hockey player
- Paul Biya (born 1933), Cameroonian politician
- Paul Blackburn (disambiguation), several people
- Paul Blackthorne (born 1969), English actor
- Paul Blanshard (1892–1980), American author
- Paul Bley (1932–2016), Canadian jazz pianist
- Paul Blomfield (born 1953), British politician
- Paul Bloodgood (1960–2018), artist and gallery owner
- Paul Bocuse (1926–2018), French chef
- Paul Boesch (1912–1989), American professional wrestler and promoter
- Paul Vanden Boeynants (1919–2001), Belgian politician
- Paul Bogart (1919–2012), American television director and producer
- Paul Boghossian (born 1957), American philosopher
- Paul Bogle (1822–1865), Jamaican Baptist deacon and activist
- Paul Bogle (priest), Dean of Clonmacnoise since 2014
- Paul Bohannan (1920–2007), American anthropologist
- Paul Bollenback (born 1959), American jazz guitarist
- Paul Bonga Bonga (born 1933), Congolese footballer
- Paul Bonner, British fantasy artist
- Paul Hyde Bonner (1893–1968), American banker, soldier, singer, diplomat, and author
- Paul Bonwick (born 1964), lobbyist and former politician in Canada
- Paul Bookout (born 1962), American politician
- Paul-Émile Borduas (1905–1960), Québecois artist
- Paul E. Boslaugh (1881–1964), associate justice of the Nebraska Supreme Court
- Paul Bostaph (born 1964), American heavy metal drummer
- Paul Bosvelt (born 1970), Dutch football coach and former professional footballer
- Paul H. Boucher (1931–2003), American city manager
- Paul Bowman (rugby league) (born 1976), Australian former professional rugby league footballer
- Paul Bowser (1886–1960), American professional wrestling promoter
- Paul Boyd (animator) (1967–2007), American-born Canadian animator
- Paul D. Boyer (1918–2018), American biochemist, Nobel prize winner
- Paul Bradshaw (disambiguation), several people
- Paul Bragg (1895–1976), American alternative health food advocate and fitness enthusiast
- Paul Bragiel (born 1977), American internet entrepreneur
- Paul Brassard, American politician
- Paul-André Brasseur (born 1994), Canadian actor
- Paul Breitner (born 1951), German international footballer
- Paul Breyne (born 1947), Belgian politician
- Paul Brickhill (1916–1991), Australian fighter pilot
- Paul Briggs, several people
- Paul Bright (author) (born 1949), English writer
- Paul Bristow (born 1979), British politician
- Paul Brodie (1934–2007), Canadian saxophonist
- Paul Broks, English neuropsychologist and science writer
- Paul Brophy (1937–1986), American firefighter
- Paul Brook, British presenter, author, mentalist and online streamer
- Paul Brooke (born 1944), English actor of film, television and radio
- Paul Brooker (born 1976), English retired professional football winger
- Paul Brooks (disambiguation), several people
- Paul Broussard (1964–1991), Houston-area banker and murder victim
- Paul Brown (1908–1991), American football coach, team owner, and executive
- Paul Brown (disambiguation), several people
- Paul Browning (American football) (born 1992), American football wide receiver
- Paul Brumfitt (born 1956), English serial killer
- Paul Brunton (politician) (born 1944), American politician and lawyer
- Paul Bryan (musician) (born 1967), American musician
- Paul Bryan (politician) (1913–2004), British politician
- Paul Bryant (1913–1983), American college football player and coach
- Paul Bryar (1910–1985), American actor
- Paul Bryers (born 1955), British film director, screenwriter, and fiction author
- Paul Buchignani (born 1967), American drummer
- Paul Buckmaster (1946–2017), English Grammy Award-winning English cellist, arranger, conductor and composer
- Paul Buentello (born 1974), American former mixed martial artist
- Paul Buhle (born 1944), American historian
- Paul Bulcke (born 1954), Belgian businessman
- Paul Burch, American musician, composer, and record producer
- Paul Burchill (born 1979), English professional wrestler
- Paul Lodu Bureng, South Sudanese politician
- Paul Burgess (musician) (born 1950), English rock drummer
- Paul Burmeister (born 1971), American sportscaster
- Paul E. Burns (1881–1967), American actor
- Paul Burstow (born 1962), British former politician
- Paul Butcher (actor) (born 1994), American actor and singer
- Paul Butcher (American football) (born 1963), American football player
- Paul Butler (polo) (1892–1981), American heir, businessman and polo player
- Paul L. Byrne (1910–1962), American politician

=== C ===
- Paul Cadmus (1904–1999), American artist
- Paul Cain (minister) (1929–2019), Pentecostal Christian minister
- Paul Cain (pen name) (1902–1966), American author of pulp fiction
- Paul Calderón, Puerto Rican actor, writer, director and producer
- Paul Johnson Calderon, American writer, television personality and socialite
- Paul Callaghan (1947–2012), New Zealand physicist
- Paul Callaghan (Gaelic footballer) (born 1971), Irish Gaelic football coach and former goalkeeper
- Paul Callan (1939–2020), British journalist and editor
- Paul Cambria, American attorney
- Paul Cameron (disambiguation), several people
- Paul Campbell (disambiguation), several people
- Paul Cantelon (born 1959), American classical music composer
- Paul Carafotes (born 1959), American actor
- Paul Carey (disambiguation), several people
- Paul Carmichael, English bass guitarist and composer
- Paul Carney (1943–2015), Irish High Court judge
- Paul Carney (British Army officer) (born 1979), senior British Army soldier
- Paul Carr (actor) (1934–2006), American actor, director, writer, and producer
- Paul Carrack (born 1951), English singer, musician, songwriter, and composer
- Paul Carter (disambiguation), multiple people
- Paul Casey (disambiguation), several people
- Paul Castro Jr., American voice actor
- Paul Cattermole (1977–2023), English singer
- Paul Cavanagh (1888–1964), English film and stage actor
- Paul Cavonis (born 1937), American actor
- Paul Cebar (born 1956), American songwriter, singer, guitarist and bandleader
- Paul Celan (1920– c.1970), Romanian-born German-language poet and translator
- Paul Cézanne (1839–1906), French artist and Post-Impressionist painter
- Paul Chafe (born 1965), Canadian science fiction author
- Paul Chaffey (born 1965), Norwegian businessperson and politician
- Paul Chahidi (born 1969), Iranian-born British Theatre World Award and Clarence Derwent Award winning and Tony and Olivier award nominated actor
- Paul A. Chamberlain, United States Army lieutenant general
- Paul Chamberlain (born 1954), Canadian philosopher and professor
- Paul Chamberland (born 1939), Canadian poet and Quebec essayist
- Paul Chamberlin (born 1962), American former professional tennis player
- Paul Chan (disambiguation), several people
- Paul Channon (1935–2007), British Conservative MP
- Paul Chaplin, American writer and comedian
- Paul Joseph Chartier (1921–1966), Canadian man who died from a bomb that he was setting off
- Paul Check, New Zealand political candidate
- Paul Chiang (conductor), Taiwanese symphony orchestra conductor, producer, chamber musician, and violinist
- Paul Chiang (politician) (born 1960), Canadian politician
- Paul Cushing Child (1902–1994), American civil servant, diplomat, and artist
- Paul Christopher (born 1971), French politician
- Paul Christie (disambiguation), several people
- Paul Chitlik, American author, television and film writer, producer, and director
- Paul Chowdhry (born 1974), English comedian and actor
- Paul Ching Wu Chu (born 1941), Chinese-American physicist
- Paul Chubb (1949–2002), Australian film, television and stage actor
- Paul Chun (born 1945), Hong Kong actor
- Paul Clayton (disambiguation), several people
- Paul Matthews Cleveland (1931–2024), American diplomat
- Paul Clement (born 1966), American Solicitor-General
- Paul Clement (football coach) (born 1972), English football coach
- Paul Clifford (disambiguation), several people
- Paul Clohessy (born 1970), Australian vision impaired tandem cyclist
- Paul Coffee (born 1956), American soccer goalkeeper
- Paul Coffey (disambiguation), several people
- Paul Colichman (born 1962), American media entrepreneur
- Paul Collier (activist) (1964–2010), Australian disability activist
- Paul Collins, multiple people
- Paul Comtois (1895–1966), Canadian politician
- Paul Cook (disambiguation), several people
- Paul Copley (born 1944), English actor and voiceover artist
- Paul Coppens, French racing cyclist
- Paul Cornell (born 1967), British writer
- Paul Cornell (lawyer) (1822–1904), American lawyer and real estate speculator
- Paul Cornet (1892–1977), French sculptor, teacher
- Paul Cornu (1881–1944), French engineer
- Paul Cosgrove (born 1934), Canadian former jurist and former politician
- Paul Costello (1894–1986), American triple Olympic rowing champion
- Paul Costelloe (born 1945), Irish designer and artist
- Paul Coulthard (born 1957), British academic and scientist
- Paul Cox (disambiguation), several people
- Paul Coyne (born 1964), American film and television editor and producer
- Paul Craft (1938–2014), American singer-songwriter
- Paul Craig (disambiguation), several people
- Paul Crampel (1864–1891), French explorer and murder victim
- Paul Creston (1906–1985), Italian-American composer of classical music
- Paul Christy (1939–2021), American professional wrestler
- Paul W. Cronin (1938–1997), American politician
- Paul Crosby (criminal) (born 19??), Irish criminal
- Paul Crossley (pianist) (born 1944), British pianist
- Paul Crouch (1934–2013), American television evangelist
- Paul Crouch Jr. (born 1959), American Christian broadcaster
- Paul Crouch (activist) (1903–1955), American communist activist and later government informant
- Paul Crowley (ice hockey) (born 1955), Canadian former professional ice hockey player
- Paul Crutzen (1933–2021), Dutch meteorologist, Nobel prize winner
- Paul Cunniffe (1961–2001), British-born, Irish singer-songwriter
- Paul Cunningham (footballer) (born 1986), New Zealand former professional soccer player
- Paul Curran (disambiguation), several people
- Paul Currie (director) (born 1968), Australian co-founder and director of Lightstream Pictures
- Paul Curry (golfer) (born 1961), English golfer

=== D ===
- Paul Dacre (born 1948), English journalist
- Paul Daley (born 1983), British mixed martial artist and kickboxer
- Paul Daly (disambiguation), several people
- Paul D'Ambrosio, American journalist and novelist
- Paul Dame, American politician
- Paul D'Amour (born 1967), American musician
- Paul Dana (1975–2006), American racing driver
- Paul Danan (1978–2025), English actor
- Paul Dano (born 1984), American actor and filmmaker
- Paul Danquah (1925–2015), British film actor
- Paul Darden (born 1968), American professional poker player, rap music promoter, and night club
- Paul Darrow (1941–2019), English actor
- Paul Davids, American independent filmmaker and writer
- Paul Davies (disambiguation), several people
- Paul Davis (disambiguation), several people
- Paul Dedewo (born 1991), Nigerian-American sprinter
- Paul Dehn (1912–1976), British screenwriter
- Paul DeJong (born 1993), American baseball player
- Paul Delaney (basketball) (born 1986), American basketball player in the Israeli National League
- Paul Michael DelVecchio Jr. (born 1980), known by Pauly D and DJ Pauly D, American television personality and DJ
- Paul DeMarco (born 1967), American lawyer and politician
- Paul DeMarco, American musician
- Paul DeMayo (1967–2005), American IFBB professional bodybuilder
- Paul Denyer (born 1972), Australian serial killer
- Paul De Lisle (born 1963), Canadian-American musician and songwriter
- Paul Delph (1957–1996), Los Angeles-based singer, songwriter, producer, engineer, and studio musician
- Paul Derringer (1906–1987), American Major League Baseball right-handed pitcher
- Paul Desiderio (born 1997), Filipino basketball player
- Paul Desmond (1924–1977), American jazz saxophonist and composer
- Paul Dessau (1894–1979), German composer and conductor
- Paul Lucien Dessau (1909–1999), British artist
- Paul Dewar (1963–2019), Canadian educator and politician
- Paul Diamond (born 1961), Croatian professional wrestler
- Paul S. Diamond (born 1953), United States district judge
- Paul Di'Anno (1958–2024), English heavy metal singer
- Paul Dillett (born 1965), Canadian retired professional bodybuilder
- Paul DiMeo (born 1958), American television personality
- Paul Dinello (born 1962), American comedian, actor, and writer
- Paul Dini (born 1957), American screenwriter and comic creator
- Paul Dirac (1902–1984), English physicist and Nobel laureate
- Paul Dirmeikis (born 1954), French-speaking poet, composer, singer, and painter
- Paul Dobson (disambiguation), several people
- Paul Doiron, American author
- Paul Dooley (born 1928), American actor
- Paul Dooley (footballer) (born 1975), Australian rules footballer
- Paul Dorfman, American mobster
- Paul Dorrity (born 1943), American racing driver
- Paul Doumer, President of France from 1931–1932
- Paul W. Downs (born 1982), American actor, writer, director, and producer
- Paul Driessen (animator) (born 1940), Dutch film director, animator, and writer
- Paul Duchesnay (born 1961), French retired ice dancer
- Paul Duffie (born 1951), Canadian politician
- Paul Dukas (1865–1935), French composer
- Paul Dunahoo, software developer and technology entrepreneur
- Paul Dunlap (1919–2010), American composer
- Paul Durant (born 1959), American racecar driver
- Paul Durousseau (born 1970), American serial killer

=== E ===
- Paul Eales (born 1963), English professional golfer
- Paul Eastwood (born 1965), English former Rugby League International goal kicking winger
- Paul Eberle, American author
- Paul Ebert (1932–2009), director of the American College of Surgeons
- Paul Eckstein (1963–2023), American actor and television writer and producer
- Paul Eddington (1927–1995), English actor
- Paul Edwards (philosopher) (1923–2004), Austrian-American moral philosopher
- Paul Ehrenfest (1880–1933), Austrian-Dutch theoretical physicist
- Paul Ehrlich (disambiguation), several people
- Paul Eiding (born 1957), American actor and instructor
- Paul Einzig (1897–1973), European economic and political writer
- Paul Edingue Ekane (born 1990), Cameroonian swimmer
- Paul Ekman (1934–2025), American psychologist
- Paul Ellering (born 1953), American professional wrestling manager, professional wrestler, and dog musher
- Paul Ellis, New Zealand record producer
- Paul John Ellis (1941–2005), British professor
- Paul J. Ellison (1940–1988), American politician
- Paul Éluard (1895–1952), French poet
- Paul Emmel (born 1968), American Major League Baseball umpire
- Paul Engelmann (1891–1965), Viennese architect
- Paul Engemann (born 1957), American former musician
- Paul-Émile d'Entremont, Canadian documentary filmmaker
- Paul Eppstein (1902–1944), German sociologist
- Paul Epstein (disambiguation), several people
- Paul Erdős (1913–1996), Hungarian mathematician
- Paul Erickson (disambiguation), several people
- Paul Eriksson (born 1991), ice hockey player
- Paul Erlich (born 1972), American music theorist
- Paul Evans (disambiguation), multiple people

=== F ===
- Paul Falkenberg (1848–1925), German botanist
- Paul Fanaika (born 1986), American football offensive guard
- Paul Fannin (1907–2002), American businessman and politician
- Paul Farmer (1959–2022), American medical anthropologist and physician
- Paul S. Farmer, British retired educationalist
- Paul Feig (born 1962), American actor, comedian, and filmmaker
- Paul Felder (born 1984), American professional mixed martial artist and color commentator for UFC
- Paul Fenech (born 1972), Australian filmmaker, film and television actor, director, producer, and writer
- Paul Fenech (footballer) (born 1986), footballer who plays in the Maltese Premier League
- Paul Ferguson (born 1958), English rock drummer
- Paul Ferguson (bishop) (born 1955), Church of England bishop
- Paul Fernando (1951–2020), Sri Lankan Sinhala baila vocalist
- Paul Ferrara (born 1939), American photographer
- Paul B. Ferrara (1942–2011), American chemist, forensic scientist, and administrator
- Paul Ferreira (born 1973), Canadian politician
- Paul Johann Anselm Ritter von Feuerbach (1775–1833), German legal scholar
- Paul Feyerabend (1924–1994), Austrian-born philosopher of science
- Paul Finch, English author and scriptwriter
- Paul Finebaum, American sports author, television and radio personality, and former columnist
- Paul Fischer (disambiguation), several people
- Paul Fisher (disambiguation), several people
- Paul Fitzgerald (disambiguation) (born 1970), multiple people
- Paul Fitzpatrick (born 1965), English former professional footballer
- Paul Fix (1901–1983), American film and television character actor
- Paul Fix (racing driver), American racecar driver
- Paul Flatley (1941–2025), American former football wide receiver
- Paul W. Fleming (born 1988), British trade union leader
- Paul Flynn (disambiguation), several people
- Paul Fonoroff (born 1954), Hong Kong's best known film critics
- Paul Foot (comedian) (born 1973), English comedian
- Paul Foot (journalist) (1937–2004), British investigative journalist, political campaigner and author
- Paul Forman (historian) (born 1937), historian of science
- Paul Forman (actor), English-French actor
- Paul Foshee (1932–2020), American politician
- Paul Christian Frank (1879–1956), Norwegian barrister, politician, organizer and non-fiction writer
- Paul Frank (born 1967), American cartoonist, artist and fashion designer
- Paul Franklin (disambiguation), several people
- Paul Frappier (1977–2011), Canadian musician known as "Bad News Brown"
- Paul D.K. Fraser (1941–2019), Canadian lawyer
- Paul Fraser (born 1955), British entrepreneur
- Paul Frazier (1967–2018), American professional football player
- Paul Fredricks (1918–2010), American brass musician
- Paul Frees (1920–1986), American actor, comedian, impressionist, and vaudevillian
- Paul Freeman (disambiguation), several people
- Paul French (disambiguation), several people
- Paul Freud (born 1959), British painter
- Paul Friedberg (born 1959), American Olympic fencer
- Paul Friedhoff (1943–2015), German politician
- Paul Fronczak (1964–2020), American baby abductee
- Paul Fry (disambiguation), several people
- Paul Fusco (born 1953), American puppeteer, actor, television producer, writer and director
- Paul Fusco (photographer) (1930–2020), American photojournalist

=== G ===
- Paul Francis Gadd (born 1944), English former singer, songwriter, and record producer whose stage name is "Gary Glitter"
- Paul A. Gagnon (1925–2005), American historian and educator
- Paul Gallico (1897–1976), American novelist and short story and sports writer
- Paul Galloway (1934–2009), American newspaper reporter, columnist and storyteller
- Paul Vernon Galloway (1904–1990), American United Methodist minister
- Paul Gambaccini (born 1949), American-British radio and television presenter
- Paul Gangelin (1898–1961), American screenwriter
- Paul J. Gannon (born 1960), American former member of the Massachusetts House of Representatives
- Paul Gapp (1928–1992), architecture critic for the Chicago Tribune
- Paul Gardiner (1958–1984), British musician
- Paul Gardner (disambiguation), several people
- Paul Garner (disambiguation), several people
- Paul Gascoigne (born 1967), English footballer
- Pau Gasol (born 1980), Spanish former professional basketball player
- Paul Wallace Gates (1901–1999), American professor of history and general historian
- Paul Gatewood, American politician
- Paul Gauguin (1848–1903), French painter
- Paul Geidel (1894–1987), longest-serving prison inmate in the United States
- Paul Gentilozzi (born 1950), American race car driver and businessman
- Paul George (disambiguation), several people
- Paul Georges (1923–2002), American painter
- Paul Giamatti (born 1967), American actor
- Paul Gilley (1929–1957), American country music lyricist and promoter
- Paul Gilliford (born 1945), American retired professional baseball player
- Paul Gilligan (judge) (born 1948), Irish judge
- Paul Gillis (born 1963), Canadian former ice hockey player
- Paul Michael Glaser (born 1943), American actor
- Paul Glass (born 1934), Swiss-American composer
- Paul Gleason (1939–2006), American film and television actor
- Paul Gleeson (magician) (born 1987), Irish TV magician, mentalist, and escapologist
- Paul Gleeson (tennis) (1880–1956), American tennis player
- Paul A. Goble (born 1949), American scholar of Russian studies
- Paul Goble (writer and illustrator) (1933–2017), British-American children's author
- Paul G. Goebel (1901–1988), American football player and politician
- Paul Goebel (television personality) (born 1968), American actor and comedian
- Paul Roland Gogo (born 1965), Canadian rock-and-roll keyboard player and multi-instrumentalist known as Gogo
- Paul Goldberg (geologist), American geologist
- Paul Goldberg (writer), American novelist and journalist
- Paul Goldberger (born 1950), American author, architecture critic, and lecturer
- Paul Goldschmidt (born 1987), American baseball player
- Paul Goldstein (law professor) (born 1943), American law professor at Stanford Law School
- Paul Goldstein (tennis) (born 1976), American tennis player
- Paul Gorguloff (1895–1932), Russian émigré and murder
- Paul Gorman (disambiguation), several people
- Paul Gosar (born 1958), American politician
- Paul Götze (1903–1948), Nazi SS officer at concentration camps executed for war crimes
- Paul Gover (born 1968), English cricketer
- Paul Grabowsky (born 1958), Australian pianist and composer
- Paul Guermonprez (1908–1944), photographer, graphic designer, Dutch resistance member in World War II
- Paul Guilfoyle (born 1949), American television and film actor
- Paul Guilfoyle (actor, born 1902) (died 1964), American stage, film and television actor
- Paul Grabowsky (born 1958), Australian pianist and composer
- Paul Graham, several people
- Paul Grant, several people
- Paul Gratzik (1935–2018), German dramatist and novelist
- Paul Gray (disambiguation), various people
- Paul Greco (1955–2008), American actor and musician
- Paul Greene (athlete) (born 1972), Australian musician and former athlete
- Paul Green (musician) (born 1972), American record producer
- Paul Greengrass (born 1955), British film director, film producer, screenwriter, and former journalist
- Paul Gregory (producer) (1920–2015), American film, theatre and television producer
- Paul Grice (1913–1988), British philosopher of language
- Paul Grice (civil servant) (born 1961), Senior civil servant
- Paul Griffin (musician) (1937–2000), American pianist and session musician
- Paul Griggs (born 1944), British musician
- Paul Grilley (born 1958), American teacher of modern yoga
- Paul Gross (disambiguation), several people
- Paul Gubitz (born 1999), German luger
- Paul Guihard (1932–1962), British journalist and murder victim
- Paul Guilfoyle (actor, born 1902) (died 1961), American stage, film and television actor
- Paul Guilfoyle (born 1949), American television and film actor
- Paul Gulacy (born 1953), American comics artist

=== H ===
- Paul Haarhuis (born 1966), Dutch tennis player
- Paul Haggis (born 1953), Canadian screenwriter and film producer
- Paul Steven Haigh (born 1957), Australian convicted serial killer
- Paul Hall (labor leader) (1914–1980), American labor leader
- Paul Halley (born 1952), English keyboardist, vocalist and composer
- Paul Halmos (1916–2006), Hungarian-born American mathematician and statistician
- Paul Hamm (born 1982), American retired artistic gymnast
- Paul A Hampton (born 1970), American musician, songwriter, and producer
- Paul Hampton (born 1937), American actor, singer, lyricist and writer
- Paul G. Hahnemann (1912–1997), German businessman, director at BMW between 1961 and 1972
- Paul David Harbour (born 1965), American bass guitar and guitar player, pianist and composer
- Paul Hardin (disambiguation), several people
- Paul Harding (disambiguation), several people
- Paul Hardy (disambiguation), several people
- Paul Hardwick (1918–1983), English actor
- Paul E. Harenberg (1931–2010), American politician
- Paul D. Harkins (1904–1984), United States Army officer and general
- Paul D. Harold, American member of the Massachusetts Senate
- Paul Harrison (disambiguation), several people
- Paul Harrod, American animation director, production designer, and art director
- Paul Harpur (born 1979), Australian twice-Paralympian
- Paul Walter Hauser (born 1986), American actor and comedian
- Paul Harvey (disambiguation), several people
- Paul Hawken (born 1946), American environmentalist
- Paul Hawksbee, British sports radio presenter and comedy writer
- Paul Healy (disambiguation), several people
- Paul Hebert (disambiguation), several people
- Paul Hecht (born 1941), English-born Canadian stage, film, and television actor
- Paul Hellmann (1876–1938), Austrian Jewish patron
- Paul Hellyer (1923–2021), Canadian engineer, politician, writer, and commentator
- Paul Hendy (born 1966), British script-writer, novelist, director, producer and filmmaker
- Paul Henderson (disambiguation), several people
- Paul Henle (1949–2018), American politician
- Paul Henley, British radio and TV journalist
- Paul Henning (1911–2005), American TV producer and screenwriter
- Paul Herbert (disambiguation), several people
- Paul Herman (disambiguation), several people
- Paul Hermann (disambiguation), several people
- Paul Herrmann (born 1985), German short-track speed-skater
- Paul Hermann (disambiguation)
- Paul Hertzog, American film composer and educator
- Paul M. Herzog (1906–1986), American lawyer, educator, civil servant, and university administrator
- Paul Hewson (born 1960), known by his stage name Bono, Irish singer of U2
- Paul Heyman (born 1965), American entertainment executive and performer
- Paul Heyse (1830–1914), German writer and translator
- Paul Hiebert (writer) (1892–1987), Canadian writer and humorist
- Paul Hill (disambiguation), several people
- Paul Jennings Hill (1954–2003), American minister executed for murder
- Paul Hindemith (1895–1963), German composer
- Paul von Hindenburg (1847–1934), German field marshal and statesman
- Paul D. "Tony" Hinkle (1899–1992), American football, basketball, and baseball player, coach, and college athletic administrator
- Paul Hinman (born 1959), Canadian politician and businessman
- Paul Hilton (disambiguation), several people
- Paul Hinder, bishop from Abu Dhabi
- Paul Hirsch (film editor) (born 1945), American film editor
- Paul Hogan (born 1939), Australian actor and comedian
- Paul Hogan (disambiguation), several people
- Paul Hollywood (born 1966), English celebrity chef and television presenter
- Paul Holmes (broadcaster) (1950–2013), New Zealand broadcaster
- Paul Homan (1893–1969), American economist
- Paul Chongkun Hong, Korean economist and professor
- Paul Hooper (born 1952), former Archdeacon of Leeds
- Paul Hoover (disambiguation), several people
- Paul Hopkins (disambiguation), several people
- Paul A. Hopper (born 1956), Australian bio-entrepreneur
- Paul J. Hopper, American linguist
- Paul Hornsby, American musician and record producer
- Paul Horn (computer scientist) (born 1946), American computer scientist and physicist
- Paul Horn (musician) (1930–2014), American flautist, saxophonist, composer, and producer
- Paul Horner (1978–2017), American writer, comedian and contributor to fake news websites
- Paul Hornung (1935–2020), American football player
- Paul Hubbard (disambiguation), several people
- Paul Hudson (disambiguation), several people
- Paul Humphries (born 1965), English cricketer
- Paul Humphrey (disambiguation), several people
- Paul Humphreys (disambiguation), several people
- Paul Hunt (disambiguation), several people
- Paul Hunter (disambiguation), several people
- Paul Hurry (born 1975), British international motorcycle speedway rider
- Paul Huson (born 1942), British writer
- Paul Courtenay Hyu, British–Chinese actor, writer and director

=== I ===
- Paul Iacono (born 1988), American actor
- Paul F. Iams (1915–2004), American founder of the Iams Company
- Paul Ignatieff (1870–1945), Russian Imperial politician
- Paul Ignatius (1920–2025), American government official
- Paul Ifill (born 1979), English former professional footballer
- Paul Ince (born 1967), English international footballer
- Paul Ingle (born 1972), British former professional boxer
- Paul Ingram, American county Republican Party chairman accused by his children of child abuse
- Paul Ioannidis (1924–2021), German-born Greek pilot, resistance fighter, and later shipping industry executive
- Paul Ireland (born 1970), Scottish actor
- Paul D. Irving (born 1957), American law enforcement officer
- Paul Irwin, American nonprofit executive, president and CEO of Elephants in Crisis
- Pavlo Ishchenko (born 1992), Ukrainian-Israeli boxer
- Paul Israel (historian) (born 1953), American historian
- Paul Israel (rugby league) (born 1969), Australian former rugby league footballer
- Paul Izzo (born 1995), Australian footballer

=== J ===
- Paul Jabara (1948–1992), American actor, singer, and songwriter
- Paul Jack (born 1965), Malaysian former footballer
- Paul Jacoulet (1896–1960), French, Japan-based woodblock print artist
- Paul Jackson (disambiguation), multiple people
- Paul Jacobs (disambiguation), multiple people
- Paul James (disambiguation), multiple people
- Paul Janes (1912–1987), German footballer
- Paul Jans (born 1981), Dutch footballer
- Paul Janson (1840–1913), Walloon Belgian liberal politician
- Paul Janssen (1926–2003), Belgian pharmacologist, founder of Janssen Pharmaceutica
- Paul Janz (born 1951), Canadian theologian
- Paul Jaques, British Army lieutenant-general
- Paul Jarman, Australian multi-instrumentalist, composer, and choirmaster
- Paul Jasmin (born 1935), American artist
- Paul Jaworski (1900–1929), American bank robber
- Paul Jeffreys (1952–1988), English rock musician
- Paul Jenkins (disambiguation), multiple people
- Paul Jennings (disambiguation), several people
- Paul Jessup (athlete) (1908–1992), American discus thrower and shot putter
- Paul Jessup (writer) (born 1977), American writer of short stories, novels, poetry, and plays
- Paul Ji (born 2004), American pianist
- Paul Johansson (born 1964), American-born Canadian actor
- Paul Johnson (disambiguation), multiple people
- Paul Johnston (disambiguation), several people
- Paul Johnstone (disambiguation), several people
- Paul Jones (disambiguation), several people
- Paul Juda, (born 2001), olympian in men's gymnastics at the 2024 Paris Olympics

=== K ===
- Paul Kagame (born 1957), President of Rwanda
- Paul Kalkbrenner (born 1977), German musician, producer of electronic music, and actor
- Paul Kandel (born 1951), American musical theatre actor and tenor singer
- Paul Kane (disambiguation), several people
- Paul Kanjorski (born 1937), American politician
- Paul Kantner (1941–2016), American rock musician
- Paul Karason (1950–2013), American with argyria, which made his skin turn purple-blue
- Paul Kariya (born 1974), Canadian former ice hockey player
- Paul Kasey (born 1973), English actor
- Paul Kavanagh (disambiguation), several people
- Paul Kaye (disambiguation). several people
- Paul Keating (born 1944), Australian prime minister
- Paul F. Keene Jr. (1920–2009), American artist and teacher
- Paul Underwood Kellogg (1879–1958), American journalist and social reformer
- Paul Kemp (disambiguation), several people
- Paul Kemprecos (born 1939), American writer
- Paul Keres (1916–1975), Estonian chess grandmaster and chess writer
- Paul Kersey (actor) (born 1970), American actor
- Paul Kessler (died 2023), Jewish American murder victim
- Paul Khoury (disambiguation), several people
- Paul Kiong (born 1944), Malaysian retired police officer
- Paul Kirby (born 1966), Australian politician
- Paul Klee (1879–1940), Swiss-German painter
- Paul Klebnikov (1963–2004), American journalist and historian
- Paul Klenerman (born 1963), British Olympic sabre fencer
- Paul Knoepfler (born 1967), American biologist, writer, and blogger
- Paul John Knowles (1946–1974), American serial killer and rapist
- Paul Knutsen, Norwegian seaman who disappeared in 1919
- Paul Kohner (1902–1988), Austrian-American talent agent and producer
- Paul Konchesky (born 1981), English football coach and former player
- Paul Konerko (born 1976), American former baseball player
- Paul Korver (born 1971), American entrepreneur, filmmaker, and producer
- Paul Koslo (1944–2019), German-born Canadian actor
- Paul Kossoff (1950–1976), English guitarist
- Paul J. Kramer (1904–1995), American biologist and plant physiologist
- Paul Kramer (1933–2020), American politician
- Paul Krassner (1932–2019), American author, journalist, and comedian
- Paul Kreppel (born 1947), American actor and director
- Paul Kretschmer (1866–1956), German linguist
- Paul Kruger (1825–1904), President of the South African Republic
- Paul Krugman (born 1953), Nobel Prize-winning American economist and writer
- Paul Kupperberg (born 1955), American writer and comics editor
- Paul Kurtz (1925–2012), American scientific skeptic and secular humanist
- Paul Kurtz (goldsmith) (died 167?), German goldsmith

=== L ===
- Paul Labriola, American gangster murdered in 1954.
- Paul Landacre (1893–1963), American artist
- Paul La Farge (1970–2023), American novelist and essayist
- Paul Lafargue (1842–1911), Cuban-born French revolutionary Marxist socialist
- Paul Laffoley (1935–2015), American visionary artist and architect
- Paul Lamb (musician) (born 1955), British blues harmonica player and bandleader
- Paul de Lamerie (1688–1751), London-based silversmith
- Paul Langlois, Canadian musician, former member of The Tragically Hip
- Paul Henry Lang (1901–1991), Hungarian-American musicologist and music critic
- Paul Langlois (politician) (1926–2012), Canadian politician
- Paul Langton (1913–1980), American actor
- Paul Larkins (born 1963), English retired middle-distance runner
- Paul Larsen (born 1970), Australian sailor
- Paul Larson (American football) (1932–2022), American football player
- Paul Larson (computer scientist), computer scientist
- Paul Lazarsfeld (1901–1976), Austrian-American sociologist
- Paul Lazarus, American director, producer, and writer of film, television, and theatre
- Paul Leder (1926–1996), American film director, writer and producer
- Paul LeDuc (wrestler) (born 1939), Canadian former professional wrestler
- Paul Lee (disambiguation), multiple people
- Paul Legault (born 1985), Canadian-American poet
- Paul Lekakis (born 1966), American actor, model, and filmmaker
- Paul Le Mat (born 1945), American actor
- Paul Lemerle (1903–1989), French Byzantinist
- Paul de Leeuw (born 1962), Dutch television comedian, singer and actor
- Paul Leni (1885–1929), German filmmaker
- Paul Léon (1874–1962), French art professor and historiographer
- Paul Lentz, American politician
- Paul LePage (born 1948), American politician and businessman
- Paul Le Roux (born 1972), African former programmer, former criminal cartel boss, and informant for the US Drug Enforcement Administration
- Paul Lever (born 1944), British retired ambassador
- Paul Levesque (born 1969), American wrestler better known as "Triple H"
- Paul Levitz (born 1956), American comic book writer
- Paul Lewis (disambiguation), multiple people
- Paul Lhérie (1844–1937), French tenor
- Paul C. H. Lim (born 1967), American ecclesiastical historian
- Paul Lindblad (1941–2006), American Major League Baseball player
- Paul Lincke (1866–1946), German composer and theater conductor
- Paul Lincoln (1932–2011), Australian professional wrestler and promoter
- Paul Martyn Lincoln (1870–1944), American electrical engineer
- Paul Linke (born 1948), American actor
- Paul Lisicky (born 1959), American novelist and memoirist
- Paul Loeb, American animal trainer and author
- Paul Rogat Loeb (born 1952), American writer
- Paul Logan (actor) (born 1973), American actor, model, martial artist, stuntman, producer, and screenwriter
- Paul Lohmann (1926–1995), American cinematographer
- Paul-Louis (disambiguation), several people
- Paul Lokech (1966–2021), Ugandan senior military officer
- Paul London (born 1980), American professional wrestler and actor
- Paul London (singer), Canadian singer
- Paul K. Longmore (1946–2010), professor of history, an author, and disability activist
- Paul F. Lorence (1955–1986), American weapon systems officer
- Paul Lotman (born 1985), American former volleyball player
- Paul Lucas (disambiguation), several people
- Paul Lukas (1894–1971), Hungarian actor
- Paul Lukas (journalist), American sports writer
- Paul Lynch (politician), Australian politician
- Paul Lynch (writer) (born 1977), Irish writer
- Paul Lynde (1926–1982), American comedian, actor, and game show panelist

=== M ===
- Paul MacCready (1925–2007), American aeronautical engineer
- Paul MacEwan (1943–2017), Canadian politician
- Paul MacKendrick (1914–1998), American classicist, author, and teacher
- Paul Mackenzie, Kenya evangelical preacher who co-founded and leads the Malindi cult
- Paul Madeley (1944–2018), English footballer
- Paul J. Madigan (1897–1974), American third warden of Alcatraz Federal Penitentiary
- Paul Magès (1908–1999), French inventor of the first self-leveling automobile suspension, known as hydro-pneumatic suspension
- Paul Magloire (1907–2001), Haitian president from 1950 to 1956
- Paul Maguire (born 1938), American football player and television sportscaster
- Paul Maguire (footballer) (born 1956), Scottish former footballer
- Paul Maguire (judge) (born 1952), British Appeal Court judge
- Paul Makler Jr. (born 1946), American Olympic fencer, son of Paul Makler Sr.
- Paul Makler Sr. (1920–2022), American Olympic fencer
- Paul Malmont (born 1966), American author
- Paul Maloney (disambiguation), several people
- Paul Manafort (born 1949), American lobbyist, political consultant, lawyer, and convicted fraudster
- Paul Manly, Canadian politician
- Paul Marcinkus (1922–2006), American Roman Catholic archbishop
- Paul Marcus (1954–2011), BAFTA winning British television director and producer
- Paul E. Marik (born 1958), African medical doctor and former professor of medicine
- Paul Marks (disambiguation), several people
- Paul Martin (born 1938), Canadian former prime minister
- Paul Martin (disambiguation), several people
- Paul Martini (born 1960), Canadian former pair skater
- Paul Marque (born 1997), French ballet dancer
- Paul Marquess (born 1964), Irish television producer
- Paul Marquis (born 1972), English former football defender
- Paul Masterson (baseball) (1915–1997), American Major League Baseball pitcher.
- Paul Mauriat (1925–2006), French orchestra leader
- Paul Maurice (born 1967), Canadian former ice hockey player and coach
- Paul Mazursky (1930–2014), American film director
- Paul McCartney (born 1942), English singer, songwriter, and musician, member of The Beatles
- Paul McCobb (1917–1969), American furniture designer
- Paul McCrane (born 1961), American film, television, and theatre actor
- Paul McCrossan (born 1942), Canadian actuary and former politician
- Paul McGann (born 1959), English actor
- Paul McGill (actor) (born 1987), American actor, choreographer, and director for stage, film, and television
- Paul McGillion, Scottish actor
- Paul McGinley (born 1966), Irish professional golfer
- Paul McGonagle (1939–1974), Irish-American mobster
- Paul C. McKasty (1964–1989), better known as Paul C, East Coast hip hop pioneer, producer, engineer, and mixer
- Paul McLoone (born 1967), Irish musician
- Paul McRae (1924–1992), Canadian politician
- Paul McShane (footballer) (born 1986), Irish football player
- Paul McShane (rugby league) (born 1989), English rugby league footballer
- Paul Meany (born 1976), American singer-songwriter
- Paul Menard (born 1980), American racing driver, son of Menards founder John Menard Jr
- Paul Menard (ice hockey) (born 1952), Canadian former ice hockey goaltender
- Paul Mecurio American comedian, actor, writer, and producer
- Paul Mendez (born 1982), Black British author
- Paul Mercurio (born 1963), Australian actor, dancer, TV presenter, and politician
- Paul Merriman, Canadian politician
- Paul Merson (born 1968), English former footballer, manager, commentator, and sports television pundit
- Paul Merton (born 1957), English writer, actor, comedian and radio and television presenter
- Paul Mescal (born 1996), Irish actor
- Paul Métivier (1900–2004), one of the last surviving Canadian veterans of the First World War
- Paul Redmond Michel (born 1941), United States circuit judge
- Paul Millar (disambiguation), several people
- Paul Miller (disambiguation), multiple people
- Paul Millman (born 1946), English squash player
- Paul Millsap (born 1985), American basketball player
- Paul Moala (born 2000), American football player
- Paul Molitor (born 1956), American baseball player
- Paul Mondoloni, French mobster
- Paul Monette (1945–1995), American author, poet, and activist
- Paul Morand (1888–1976), French author
- Paul Morphy (1837–1884), American chess player
- Paul S. Morton (born 1950), American Baptist pastor
- Paul B. Moses (1929–1966), American art historian, critic, and educator
- Paul Moskau (born 1953), American former Major League Baseball pitcher
- Paul Motian (1931–2011), American jazz drummer, percussionist, and composer
- Paul Mounet (1847–1922), French actor
- Paul Moyer (born 1941), American journalist
- Paul Moyer (American football) (born 1961), American former football player
- Paul Muenzer (1932–2014), American school administrator and politician
- Paul Muni (1895–1967), Austro-Hungarian American stage and film actor
- Paul Murphy (disambiguation), several people

=== N ===
- Paul-Henri Nargeolet (1946–2023), French deep sea explorer
- Paul Naschy (1934–2009), Spanish film actor, screenwriter, and director
- Paul Nash (disambiguation), several people
- Paul Nassif (born 1962), American plastic surgeon and television personality
- Paul Neary (1949–2024), British comic book artist, writer, and editor
- Paul Negoescu (born 1984), Romanian film director
- Paul Nehlen (born 1969), American businessman
- Paul Nelson (disambiguation), several people
- Paul Neu (born 1966), American professional wrestler known by the ring name "P. N. News"
- Paul Neurath, American video game designer
- Paul Newman (1925–2008), American actor and philanthropist
- Paul Ngei (1923–2004), Kenyan politician
- Paul Nicklen (born 1968), Canadian photographer, film-maker, author, and marine biologist
- Paul Nipkow (1860–1940), German inventor
- Paul Nitz, American Paralympic athlete
- Paul Noble (born 1963), British visual artist
- Paul Alexander Nolan, Canadian actor
- Paul V. Nolan, American politician
- Paul Noonan, Irish songwriter, vocalist, and multi-instrumentalist
- Paul Nordoff (1909–1977), American composer and music therapist
- Paul Norris (1914–2007), American comic book artist
- Paul Norris (visual effects), British visual effects supervisor
- Paul Northfield, British record producer
- Paul Norton (musician) (born 1961), Australian singer-songwriter and guitarist
- Paul Novotny (born 1965/1966), American politician
- Paul-Georges Ntep (born 1992), African professional footballer

=== O ===
- Paul Oakenfold (born 1963), English DJ and electronic musician
- Paul O'Flynn (Gaelic footballer) (born 1985), Irish Gaelic footballer
- Paul O'Flynn (journalist) (born 1985), Irish television reporter
- Paul Ogorzow (1912–1941), German serial killer and rapist
- Paul O'Grady (disambiguation), several people
- Paul O'Halloran (born 1950), Australian politician
- Paul Okon (born 1972), Australian football manager and player
- Paul Oliver (disambiguation), several people
- Paul (Olmari) (1914–1988), head of the Orthodox Church of Finland
- Paul E. Olsen (born 1953), American paleontologist and author
- Paul O'Neal, Chicago police shooting victim
- Paul O'Neil (born 1953), American ice hockey player
- Paul O'Neill (disambiguation), several people
- Paul Oram, Canadian politician
- Paul Orndorff (1949–2021), American professional wrestler
- Paul Osborn (1901–1988), American playwright and screenwriter
- Paul Osborne (born 1966), Australian rugby league footballer and politician
- Paul O'Sullivan (disambiguation), several people
- Paul Otlet (1868–1944), Belgian author and peace activist, father of information science
- Paul Overby (born 1942), American author
- Paul Overstreet (born 1955), American country music singer and songwriter
- Paul Owens (disambiguation), several people

=== P ===
- Paul Painlevé (1863–1933), mathematician and statesman
- Paul Pairet (born 1964), French chef
- Paul Park (born 1954), American science fiction author and fantasy author
- Paul Parks (1923–2009), American civil engineer
- Paul Patten (ice hockey) (1920–1992), American ice hockey coach
- Paul E. Patton (born 1937), governor of Kentucky from 1995 until 2003
- Paul R. Patton (born 1950), professor of philosophy at the University of New South Wales, Sydney, Australia
- Paul Pauk (1912–1941), American football player
- Paul Paul (1894–1979), Armenian American farmer and politician
- Paul Pavelka (died 1917), American aviator
- Paul G. Pearson (1926–2000), American academic
- Paul Pedersen (composer) (born 1935), Canadian composer, arts administrator, and music educator
- Paul Pedersen (gymnast) (1886–1948), Norwegian gymnast
- Paul Pelland (born 1966), long distance motorcyclist
- Paul Peller (born 1941), Canadian professional wrestler
- Paul Pelosi (born 1940), American businessman
- Paul Pelseneer (1863–1945), Belgian malacologist, morphologist, ethologist and phylogenist
- Paul Pena (1950–2005), American singer, songwriter, and guitarist
- Paul Perschmann (1952–2009), American professional wrestler under the ring name Buddy Rose
- Paul Le Person (1931–2005), French actor
- Paul Perera (1929–2007), Sri Lankan Sinhala politician and lawyer
- Paul Perez (born 1986), Samoan rugby union player
- Paul Perez (screenwriter) (1894–1984), American screenwriter
- Paul Perry (cinematographer) (1891–1963), American cinematographer
- Paul Peters (disambiguation), several people
- Paul Petersen (born 1945), American actor, singer, novelist, and activist
- Paul Peterson (disambiguation), several people
- Paul Phua, Malaysian Chinese businessman and poker player
- Paul Pierce (born 1977), American basketball player
- Paul Picard (1930–1994), American film producer
- Paul Picerni (1922–2011), American film and television actor
- Paul St-Pierre Plamondon (born 1977), Canadian lawyer, television columnist, and politician
- Paul Edward Plunkett (1935–2018), United States district judge
- Paul Pogba (born 1993), French footballer
- Paul N. Poirier (born 1948), American politician
- Paul Poirier (born 1991), Canadian ice dancer
- Paul Poiret (1879–1944), French fashion designer
- Paul Jackson Pollock (1912–1956), American painter
- Paul Pons (1864–1915), French wrestler
- Paul Poom (born 1958), Estonian actor
- Paul Popovich (born 1940), American former baseball player
- Paul Popowich, Canadian actor
- Paul Porcasi (1879–1946), Italian actor
- Paul Porter (biker) (born 1963), Canadian outlaw biker and gangster
- Paul Posluszny (born 1984), American football player
- Paul Potts (born 1970), English tenor
- Paul Potts (writer) (1911–1990), British-born poet
- Paul Warner Powell (1978–2010), American murderer
- Paul Préboist (1927–1997), French actor
- Paul B. Preciado (born 1970), Spanish writer, philosopher and curator
- Paul Prenter (died 1991), British-born, Irish music manager
- Paul Pressler (politician) (1930–2024), retired justice of the Texas 14th Circuit Court of Appeals
- Paul Prestopino (1939–2023), American multi-instrumental musician

=== Q ===
- Paul Qualley, American former model and father of Rainey Qualley
- Paul Quantrill (born 1968), Canadian former baseball relief pitcher
- Paul Quarrington (1953–2010), Canadian novelist, playwright, screenwriter, filmmaker, musician, and educator
- Paul Quassa (born 1952), Canadian politician, fourth premier of Nunavut
- Paul Quessenberry (born 1992), American football player
- Paul Quinn (c. 1986–2007), Irish murder victim
- Paul Quinton (born 1944), American physiologist

=== R ===
- Paul Rabil (born 1985), American lacrosse player
- Paul Rae (born 1968), American actor
- Paul Ramsey (politician), Canadian academic and politician
- Paul J. Ray, American attorney and government official
- Paul Ray, American businessman, politician, and former law enforcement officer
- Paul Ready (born 1977), British actor
- Paul Ré (born 1950), American artist, writer, poet, and peace advocate
- Paul Reclus (anarchist) (1858–1941), French anarchist
- Paul Reclus (surgeon) (1847–1914), French physician specializing in surgery
- Paul Redfarn (born 1963), English cricketer
- Paul Redfern (disappeared 1927), American musician and pilot
- Paul Rée (1849–1901), German author, physician, and philosopher
- Paul Reed (disambiguation), several people
- Paul Dennis Reid (1957–2013), American serial killer
- Paul Reilly (disambiguation), several people
- Paul Reinhart (born 1960), Canadian former ice hockey player
- Paul Reiser (born 1956), American comedian
- Paul Reitsma (born 1948), Canadian former member of the Legislative Assembly of British Columbia, Canada
- Paul Renner (type designer) (1878–1956), German typeface designer and author
- Paul Renner (politician) (born 1967), American lawyer and politician
- Paul Reubens (1952–2023), American comedian known for playing Pee-wee Herman
- Paul Reuter (disambiguation), several people
- Paul Revere (1735–1818), patriot of the American Revolution and silversmith
- Paul Rey (born 1992), Swedish singer and songwriter
- Paul Reynolds (disambiguation), multiple people
- Paul Rhoads (born 1967), American college football coach
- Paul Ezra Rhoades (1957–2011), American spree killer and suspected serial killer
- Paul Rhodes (born 1956), Canadian political strategist
- Paul Richards (disambiguation), multiple people
- Paul Richardson (disambiguation), multiple people
- Paul Rico (1925–2004), FBI agent
- Paul Riley (disambiguation), several people
- Paul X. Rinn (1946–2022), United States Navy officer
- Paul Riser (born 1943), American trombonist and Motown musical arranger
- Paul G. Risser (1939–2014), American ecologist and academic
- Paul Ritchie (footballer, born 1975), Scottish football coach and former professional player
- Paul Ritter (disambiguation), several people
- Paul Roach (1927–2023), American former football player, coach, and college athletics administrator
- Paul Craig Roberts (born 1939), American economist and author
- Paul Roberts (disambiguation), several people
- Paul Robertson (disambiguation), several people
- Paul Robeson (1898–1976), American actor, singer and activist
- Paul Robeson Jr. (1927–2014), American author, archivist and historian
- Paul Roche (1916–2007), British poet, novelist, and professor of English
- Paul Roche (hurler) (born 1982), Irish sportsperson
- Paul Rock (politician), Welsh politician
- Paul Rock (criminologist), British criminologist
- Paul J. Rock, American Marine Corps lieutenant general
- Paul Rodgers (born 1949), English musician/songwriter, singer in Free and Bad Company
- Paul Rodriguez (actor) (born 1955), Mexican-American actor
- Paul Rodriguez (skateboarder) (born 1984), American professional street skateboarder, actor, rapper, and recording artist
- Paul Rohmer (1876–1977), Alsacian physician
- Paul Romanuk (born 1961), Canadian sportscaster and writer
- Paul Roma (born 1960), American professional wrestler
- Paul Romer (born 1955), American economist and policy entrepreneur
- Paul Rooney (disambiguation), several people
- Paal Roschberg (1909–1955), Norwegian dancer, actor, and writer
- Paul Rosche (1934–2016), German engineer
- Paul Rose (disambiguation), several people
- Paul Rosen (born 1960), Canadian sledge hockey goalie
- Paul M. Rosen, American attorney and government official
- Paul Rosenberg (art dealer) (1881–1959), French art dealer
- Paul Rosenberg (music manager) (born 1971), American manager of Eminem and head of Shady Records
- Paul Rosenfels (1909–1985), American psychiatrist and psychoanalyst
- Paul Rowles (died 2013), American serial killer
- Paul Rowlett (born 1966), English academic
- Paul Rubell (born 1952), American film editor
- Paul Rudd (born 1969), American actor
- Paul Rudd (DJ) (born 1979), English house music DJ
- Paul Ryan Rudd (1940–2010), American actor known for theater work
- Paul Rudnick (born 1957), American writer
- Paul Rugg (born 1960), American screenwriter, producer, voice actor, and puppeteer
- Paul Rugg (cricketer) (born 1978), New Zealand cricketer
- Paul Runge (serial killer) (born 1970), American serial killer
- Paul Russell (dancer) (1947–1991), American classical ballet dancer, choreographer, and artistic director
- Paul Russell (disambiguation), multiple people
- Paul S. N. Russell-Gebbett (1926–1992), British linguist
- Paul Ryan (disambiguation), several people

=== S ===
- Paul Sabu (born 1960), American singer, songwriter, producer, and guitarist
- Paul Sacher (1906–1999), Swiss conductor, patron, and billionaire businessperson
- Paul J. Sachs (1878–1965), American investor, businessman and museum director
- Paul Sagar, British political theorist
- Paul Salas (born 1998), Filipino actor, model, and vlogger
- Paul Sally (1933–2013), American professor of mathematics
- Paul Samuelson (1915–2009), Nobel Prize-winning American economist
- Paul Sanchez, American guitarist and singer-songwriter
- Paul Sanchez (bishop) (born 1946), American prelate of the Roman Catholic Church
- Paul Sand (born 1932), American actor and comedian
- Paul M. Sand (1914–1984), American attorney and jurist
- Paul Sandby (1731–1809), English map-maker turned landscape painter
- Paul Sarbanes (1933–2020), American politician and attorney
- Paul Sass (born 1988), English retired mixed martial artist
- Paul Satterfield (born 1960), American actor
- Paul Sauvé (1907–1960), Canadian lawyer, World War II veteran, and politician, 17th premier of Quebec
- Paul Sauvé (curler) (1939–2020), Canadian curler
- Paul Schäfer (1921–2010), German-Chilean Christian minister
- Paul Schaffer (1924–2020), Austrian-born French Holocaust survivor
- Paul Schenck (born 1958), American pastoral practitioner, author, and lecturer
- Paul F. Schenck (1899–1968), American educator and politician
- Paul Schenk (1899–1977), German music theorist
- Paul Scheuring (born 1968), American screenwriter and director of films and television shows
- Paul Schibli, Canadian animator, storyboard artist, director, and painter
- Paul Schmidt (disambiguation), several people
- Paul Schmidtberger, American author
- Paul Schoeman (born 1992), South African rugby union player
- Paul Scholes (born 1974), England international footballer
- Paul Scholz (1902–1995), German journalist and politician
- Paul Scofield (1922–2008), English actor
- Paul Scott (novelist) (1920–1978), English novelist
- Paul Schrier (born 1970), American actor, director, and artist
- Paul Scully (born 1968), British politician
- Paul Scully (Australian politician), Australian politician
- Paul Sereno (born 1957), American paleontologist
- Paul Sewald (born 1990), American baseball player
- Paul Shaffer (born 1949), Canadian singer, composer, actor, author, comedian, and multi-instrumentalist
- Paul R. Shaffer (1930–1975), American coloney and military aide assassinated in Iran
- Paul Shane (1940–2013), British actor and comedian
- Paul Shanley (1931–2020), American Roman Catholic priest
- Paul Shenar (1936−1989), American actor and theater director
- Paul Shields (disambiguation), several people
- Paul Shortino (born 1953), American rock singer
- Paul Signac (1863–1935), French Neo-Impressionist painter
- Paul Silas (1943–2022), American former basketball player and head coach
- Paul Simon (born 1941), American musician
- Paul Simon (disambiguation), several people
- Paul E. Simons, U.S. diplomat
- Paul Simonon (born 1955), English rock bassist, most notably of the Clash
- Paul Sinha (born 1970), English professional quizzer, comedian, doctor, and broadcaster
- Paul Sinopoli (1975–2006), Canadian outlaw biker and gangster
- Paul Siple (1908–1968), American Antarctic explorer and geographer
- Paul Skenes (born 2002), American professional baseball pitcher
- Paul Skudlarek, American politician
- Paul Skiba (born 1960), American man who went missing in 1999
- Paul Smith (disambiguation), several people
- Paul Snider (1951–1980), Canadian nightclub promoter, pimp, and murderer
- Paul Soles (1930–2021), Canadian voice actor
- Paul Solman (born 1944), American journalist
- Paul Sorensen (1926–2008), American film, theater and television actor
- Paul Sorensen (landscape gardener) (1891–1983), Danish-born Australian landscape gardener and nurseryman
- Paul Soriano (born 1981), Filipino commercial and film director, producer
- Paul Sorrento (born 1965), American baseball player and coach
- Paul Sorvino (1939–2022), American actor
- Paul-Henri Spaak (1899–1972), Belgian Socialist politician, diplomat and statesman
- Paul Sparkes (born 1960), British retired swimmer
- Paul Sparks (born 1971), American actor
- Paul Spickard (born 1950), American historian and the author of several books
- Paul Spike, American author, editor and journalist
- Paul Stanford, American founder of The Hemp and Cannabis Foundation
- Paul Stanley (born 1952), American musician and co-founder of the band Kiss
- Paul Stanley (disambiguation)
- Paul M. Starnes (1934–2015), American politician
- Paul Stastny (born 1985), Canadian-American ice hockey player
- Paul Steck (1866–1924), French painter
- Paul H. Steen (died 2020), Engineer and scientist
- Paul Steigerwald (born 1954), American sportscaster
- Paul Stein (disambiguation), several people
- Paul Steiner (born 1957), German retired professional footballer
- Paul Steiner (language creator), German volapükist
- Paul Michael Stephani (1944–1998), American serial killer
- Paul Ivy Sterling (died 1880), British lawyer and Judge
- Paul Sterling (born 1964), English former rugby league footballer
- Paul Stern (1892–1948), Austrian international bridge player and lawyer
- Paul Stine (died 1969), American murder victim
- Paul Stoddart (born 1955), Australian businessman
- Paul Stone (born 1968/1969), American businessman
- Paul Stookey (born 1937), American singer-songwriter
- Paul Storr (1770–1844), English goldsmith and silversmith
- Paul Strand (1890–1976), American photographer and filmmaker
- Paul Strand (baseball) (1893–1974), American baseball pitcher and outfielder
- Paul Strang (born 1970), Zimbabwean cricket coach and former international player
- Paul Sturgess (footballer) (born 1975), English former professional footballer
- Paul Sturgess (basketball) (born 1987), British former professional basketball player
- Paul Sullivan (disambiguation), several people
- Paul Sutter, American astrophysicist
- Paul Symon (born 1960), Director-General of the Australian Secret Intelligence Service

=== T ===
- Paul Taggart (born 1980), American photographer
- Paul Tang (politician) (born 1967), Dutch politician
- Paul Tanner (disambiguation), several people
- Paul Taylor (disambiguation), several people
- Paul Telfer (actor) (born 1979), Scottish actor
- Paul Telfer (footballer) (born 1971), Scottish footballer
- Paul Teutul Jr. (born 1974), American reality television series American Chopper star
- Paul Teutul Sr. (born 1949), American founder of Orange County Choppers
- Paul Theriault (1950–2024), Canadian ice hockey coach
- Paul Thériault, Canadian politician
- Paul Thissen (born 1966), American politician and attorney
- Paul Thomas (disambiguation), several people
- Paul Thompson (disambiguation), several people
- Poul Thomsen (1922–1988), Danish film actor
- Paul Thomson (disambiguation), several people
- Paul Thorn (born 1964), American Southern rock, country, Americana, and blues singer-songwriter
- Paul Thurmond (born 1976), American politician
- Paul Tillich (1886–1965), German-American Christian existentialist philosopher, religious socialist, and Lutheran theologian
- Paul Tiulana (1921–1994), Iñupiat artist and dancer from Alaska
- Paul Tobias (born 1963), American guitarist
- Paul Tom, Canadian documentary filmmaker
- Paul F. Tompkins (born 1968), American comedian, actor, and writer
- Paul Toole (born 1970), Australian politician
- Paul A. Toth (born 1964), American novelist and short story writer
- Paul E. Tracy (died 2020), American criminologist and professor
- Paul Tracy (born 1968), Canadian-American auto racing driver
- Paul Travis (1891–1975), American artist
- Paul Trimboli (born 1969), Australian footballer
- Paul Tseng, Chinese-American and Canadian applied mathematician who disappeared in 2012
- Paul Tsongas (1941–1997), American politician
- Paul Tucker (disambiguation), several people
- Paul Twitchell (died 1971), American author and spiritual teacher
- Paul Tyler (born 1941), UK politician

=== U ===
- Paul Uhlenhuth (1870–1957), German bacteriologist and immunologist
- Paul Ulibarri (born 1988), American professional disc golfer
- Paul Underwood (born 1973), English former professional football player
- Paul Urbain (born 1957), Belgian field hockey player
- Paul Urquhart (1877–1940) pseudonym for author Ladbroke Black
- Paul Usher (born 1961), English actor
- Paul Usoro (born 1958), Nigerian litigator, communication law expert and president of the Nigerian Bar Association

=== V ===
- Paul Vachon (1937–2024), Canadian professional wrestler
- Paul Vados, American murder victim
- Paul van Dyk (born 1971), German DJ, record producer, and musician
- Paul Van Dyke (1859–1933), American historian and the brother of Henry Van Dyke
- Paul Varelans (1969–2021), American professional mixed martial artist
- Paul Valéry (1871–1945), French poet, essayist, and philosopher
- Paul Van Himst (born 1943), Belgian footballer
- Paul van Ostaijen (1896–1928), Belgian poet and writer
- Paul Varelans (1969–2021), American professional mixed martial artist
- Paul Vario (1914–1988), American mobster and made man
- Paul Vengola, Indian actor
- Paul Verhoeven (disambiguation), several people
- Paul Verlaine (1844–1896), French poet
- Paul Vickers (born 1966 or 1967), Canadian politician
- Paul Vidal de La Blache (1845–1918), French geographer
- Paul Virilio (1932–2018), French cultural theorist, urbanist, architect and aesthetic philosopher
- Paul Vixie, American computer scientist
- Paul Volcker (1927–2019), American economist
- Paul Völckers (1891–1946), German World War II general
- Paul Volpe (mobster) (1927–1983), Italian-Canadian mobster
- Paul Volpe (poker player) (born 1981), American professional poker player

=== W ===
- Paul Wahlberg (born 1964), American chef, actor and reality TV star
- Paul Walker (1973–2013), American actor
- Paul Wall (born 1981), American rapper and DJ
- Paul Walsh (disambiguation), several people
- Paul Walter (born 1994), English player for Essex County Cricket Club
- Paul Walters (1947–2006), BBC radio and TV producer
- Paul Walther (1927–2014), American basketball player
- Paul Waner (1903–1965), American professional baseball right fielder
- Paul Wanner (born 2005), Austrian professional footballer
- Paul Yorck von Wartenburg (1835–1897), German lawyer, writer, and philosopher
- Paul Washer (born 1961), American Protestant Christian evangelist
- Paul Wasserman (1934–2007), American prominent entertainment publicist
- Paul Watkins (disambiguation), several people
- Paul Watson (disambiguation), several people
- Paul Joseph Watson (born 1982), British far-right YouTuber, radio host and conspiracy theorist
- Paul Webster (disambiguation), several people
- Paul Weis (1907–1991), Austrian lawyer and survivor of Nazi persecution
- Paul Weiss (disambiguation), several people
- Paul J. Weitz (1932–2017), American astronaut
- Paul Weitz (filmmaker) (born 1965), American screenwriter, director, and producer
- Paul Wekesa (born 1967), Kenyan tennis player
- Paul Weldon, Canadian graphic designer and architect
- Paul Weller (disambiguation), several people
- Paul Wellstone (1944–2002), American academic, author, and politician
- Paul Wenck (1892–1964), German and American illustrator
- Paul von Werner (1707–1785), Chief of Prussian Hussar Regiment No. 6
- Paul Wesley (born 1982), American actor
- Paul Westhead (born 1939), American retired basketball coach
- Paul Westphal (1950–2021), American basketball player, head coach, and commentator
- Paul Weyrich (1942–2008), American religious conservative political activist and commentator`
- Paul Whaley (1947–2019), American drummer
- Paul Whelan (politician) (1943–2019), Australian state politician
- Paul F. Whelan, Irish computer scientist and professor
- Paul Whelan (born 1970), Canadian-born former United States Marine
- Paul White (disambiguation), several people
- Paul Whitehouse (born 1958), Welsh comedian
- Paul Wieghardt (1897–1969), German-born American artist and professor
- Paul Wiggins (athlete) (born 1962), Australian wheelchair racer
- Paul Wight (born 1972), American wrestler known as "Big Show"
- Paul Wilbur (born 1951), American Christian musician, worship leader, and guitarist
- Paul Williams (disambiguation), several people
- Paul Willis (disambiguation), several people
- Paul Wilson, multiple people
- Paul Winchell (1922–2005), American ventriloquist, comedian, actor, voice artist, humanitarian, and inventor
- Paul Winfield (1939–2004), American stage, film, and television actor
- Paul Witteman (born 1946), Dutch journalist and television presenter
- Paul Junger Witt (1941–2018), American film and television producer
- Paul Wohl (1901–1985), German-born journalist and political commentator
- Paul Wolfowitz (born 1943), American political scientist and diplomat
- Paul Wong (disambiguation), several people
- Paul Wood (disambiguation), several people
- Paul Woods, several people

=== X ===
- Paul Xander, American artist

=== Y ===
- Paul Yakabuski (1922–1987), Canadian politician
- Paul Ivan Yakovlev (1894–1983), Russian-American neuroanatomist
- Paul (Yazigi), (born 1959), metropolitan of the archdiocese of Aleppo, Syria, of the Church of Antioch
- Paul Yego (born 1968), Kenyan distance and marathon runner
- Paul Ygartua (born 1945), Canadian artist of British birth
- Paul P. Yoder (1897–1965), American politician
- Paul Young (disambiguation), several people
- Paul N. Yu (1915–1991), American cardiologist, physician-scientist and educator
- Paul Yu (died 2016), Chinese-American academic

=== Z ===
- Pat Zachry (1952–2024), American former baseball pitcher
- Paul Zaeske (1945–1992), American football player
- Paul Zammit (born 1941), Australian politician
- Paul Zammit (footballer) (born 1969), Maltese football manager and former player
- Paul Zanolini (1898–1989), American wrestler
- Paul Zarifopol (1874–1934), Romanian literary and social critic, essayist, and literary historian
- Paul Zaza (born 1952), Canadian Genie Award-winning film score and songwriter
- Paul Zeltwanger (born 1966), American accountant and politician
- Paul Zerdin (born 1972), British comedian and ventriloquist
- Paul Zindel (1936–2003), American playwright, young adult novelist, and educator
- Paul Zipser (born 1994), German professional basketball player
- Paul Zukerberg (born 1957), American activist, lawyer, and politician

== Fictional characters ==
- Paul, a three-eyed monkey who was the mascot for the production company, DNA Productions
- Paul, a character in The Edison Twins
- Paul, a character in the 1937 American romantic comedy movie She Married an Artist
- Paul, a character in the 1969 French romantic drama movie Love Is a Funny Thing
- Paul, the main character in the 1975 French drama film The Story of Paul
- Paul, a character in the 1977 movie Pete's Dragon
- Paul, a character in the 1981 American slasher movie The Prowler
- Paul, a character in the 1984 American 3D slasher movie Silent Madness
- Paul, the main character in the 1984 Television Special The Care Bears Battle the Freeze Machine
- Paul, a character in the 1988 American drama movie Another Woman
- Paul, a character in the 1988 American science-fiction horror movie Pulse
- Paul, character in the 1990 American crime thriller film movie The Grifters
- Paul, a character in the 1994 Hong Kong romantic comedy film He's a Woman, She's a Man
- Paul, a character in the 1998 American sitcom Two of a Kind
- Paul, a character in the 2000 American comedy film The Photographer
- Paul, a character is a 2000 American romantic comedy movie Enemies of Laughter
- Paul, a character in the 2000 American romantic comedy-drama movie High Fidelity
- Paul, a character in the 2001 American comedy-drama movie Lovely & Amazing
- Paul, a character in the 2003 American romantic comedy movie My Boss's Daughter
- Paul, a character in the 2004 American comedy movie Connie and Carla
- Paul, a character in the 2004 American science fiction disaster movie The Day After Tomorrow
- Paul, a character in the 2004 movie The Blackwater Lightship
- Paul, one of the two main characters in the 2004 Irish buddy comedy drama movie Adam & Paul
- Paul, a character played by Rick Howland in the 2007 movie The Roommate
- Paul, a character played by Samuel L. Jackson in the 2009 American drama movie Mother and Child
- Paul, the real name of Don Paolo from Professor Layton
- Paul, a character in the 2009 American romantic comedy-drama movie 500 Days of Summer
- Paul, the main character in the 2011 self titled movie
- Paul, a recurring character in the 2011 television series American Horror Story
- Paul, a character in the 2012 American independent feature movie California Solo
- Paul, a character in the 2013 coming-of-age movie Puppylove
- Paul, a character in the 2013 movie Shockwave
- Paul, a character in the 2016 American-Canadian science fiction movie A.R.C.H.I.E.
- Paul, a character in the Japanese anime series Pokémon and Diamond and Pearl
- Paul, a character in the British flash-animated web series Eddsworld
- Paul, a character in the 2020 psychological drama movie The Father
- Paul, a character in the movie 2021 American anthology horror movie Bad Candy
- Paul, a character in the 2023 independent movie Close to You
- Paul, a character in the 2023 American action comedy movie Mafia Mamma
- Paul Anders, a character in the 1982 Australian movie Turkey Shoot
- Paul Andrews, a character in the 1989 American science-fiction drama movie Beyond the Stars
- Dr. Paul Ashurst, in the British television crime drama Dalziel and Pascoe
- Paul Atreides, a character in the Dune universe
- Paul Bearer, professional wrestling alias of William Moody
- Dr. Paul Bearer, a character host of 1973 TV horror movie series Creature Feature
- Paul Blaine, a character in the 1986 American-British made-for-television syndicated comedy fantasy horror movie The Canterville Ghost
- Capt. Paul Block, in the American sitcom Car 54, Where Are You?
- Paul Blofis, a character in Percy Jackson & the Olympians
- Paul Bongard, a character in the 1971 American comedy-drama movie B.S. I Love You
- Mr. Paul Bracken, in the TV sitcom Herman's Head
- Paul Buchman, the main character in the American television sitcom Mad About You
- Paul Bunyan, a giant lumberjack from American and Canadian folklore accompanied by Babe the Blue Ox
- Paul Callan, the main character in the 2003 TV series Miracles
- Paul Clarke (character) from the Henderson's Boys spy novel series by Robert Muchamore
- Paul Clayton and Paul Connor characters from the British ITV soap opera Coronation Street
- Paul Coker and Paul Priestly, in the BBC soap opera EastEnders
- Paul Clough and Paul Collins, in the British television soap opera Brookside
- Paul Cramer, in the ABC daytime soap opera One Life to Live
- Paul Dawson, played by Michael Buie in the ABC television series Grey's Anatomy
- Paul Davenport, played by John Heard in the 1988 American fantasy comedy-drama movie Big
- Sgt. Paul Davidson, a character in the 2001 thriller movie Good Neighbor
- Paul Dewey, a character played by James LeGros in the 2007 movie Cough Drop
- Paul Drake (character), a private detective in the Perry Mason novels and TV series
- Paul Duncan, a fictional blind musician in the Pluto manga and anime series
- Paul Eastman, in the television series Ghost Whisperer
- Paul Eckert, a character in the 1956 Austrian comedy movie And Who Is Kissing Me?
- Paul Forrester, the main character in the American science fiction television series Starman
- Paul Freedman, in Halloween (1978), Halloween (2007)
- Paul Germani, a character in the American crime drama television series The Sopranos
- Paul Greebie, a recurring character in the Canadian television series Life with Derek
- Paul Hennessy, played by John Ritter in the American sitcom 8 Simple Rules
- Paul Hinkle, a character on the Canadian TV show Caillou
- Paul Holden, a character in the 1967 coming-of-age novel The Outsiders
- Paul Hornsby, in the American daytime television soap opera General Hospital
- Paul Hunham, a character in the 2023 film The Holdovers
- Sgt. Paul Jackson, a playable character in the video game Call of Duty 4: Modern Warfare
- Paul Kellerman, in the American television series Prison Break
- Paul Kessler, a character in the 1991 American mystery movie Liebestraum
- Paul Kinsey, in the American television series Mad Men
- Paul Krapence, a character in the American sitcom television series Cheers
- Paul Lahote, a character in the Twilight novel series Twilight Saga
- Paul "Polo" Loman, a character in the Jaws movie franchise
- Paul Marsden (Emmerdale), in the British television soap opera Emmerdale
- Paul Matthews, the titular character of The Guy Who Didn't Like Musicals by Team StarKid
- Paul Martin (All My Children), in the American soap opera All My Children
- Paul Martin, on the American television series Lassie
- Paul McClain and Paul Robinson, on the Australian soap opera Neighbours
- Paul McQue / Kick-Ass II, in the British comic book series Kick-Ass and Hit-Girl
- Paul Narita, on the American soap opera Days of Our Lives
- Paul Patten or the Fox, a superhero in MLJ Comics and DC comics
- Paul Joshua Pfeiffer, in the American television series The Wonder Years
- Paul Phoenix, from the Tekken franchise
- Mayor Paul Randolph, a character in the American comedy-drama television series Ginny & Georgia
- Paul Ryan, on the American soap opera As the World Turns
- Paul Sheldon, main character in Stephen King's Misery and its film adaptation
- Paul Spector, the main character in the Irish TV series The Fall
- Paul Stark, the main character played by Jeffrey Tambor in the 1986 television series Mr. Sunshine (1986 TV series)
- Paul the Refugee Lad, a character in the 1947 American drama movie The Return of Rin Tin Tin
- Paul Tomlinson, the main character in the 1991 American movie Victim of Love
- Paul Torres, in the television series The Following
- Paul Trueman, on the British BBC soap opera EastEnders
- Paul Truman, in the American sitcom Will & Grace
- Paul Warren, a character in the 1980 American disaster movie The Night the Bridge Fell Down
- Paul Williams, on the American soap opera The Young and the Restless
- Paul Varjak, in Breakfast at Tiffany's
- Paul Young, on the American television series Desperate Housewives

== See also ==
- – for people known as "Paul of ..."
- Jean-Paul (disambiguation)
- John Paul (disambiguation)
- Paavo
- Pablo
- Paolo
- Pauli
- Paull
- Paul the Octopus
- Paulo
- Paulus
- Paul-Antoine
- Paul (disambiguation)
- Paula (given name), feminine of Paul
- Paul (surname)
- Pavel
- Pavlos
- Poul
