= Paul Robertson =

Paul Robertson may refer to:

- Paul J. Robertson (born 1946), former Democratic member of the Indiana House of Representatives
- Paul Robertson (violinist) (1952–2016), first violin of the Medici String Quartet
- Paul W. Robertson (1954–2014), Canadian businessperson, former president of Shaw Media
- Paul Robertson (footballer) (born 1972), English footballer, for Stockport County, Bury and Doncaster Rovers, see List of Bury F.C. players (1–24 appearances)
- Paul Robertson (animator) (born 1979), Australian animator known for pixelised animation work
- R. Paul Robertson, American endocrinologist
