= Patriarch Paul I =

Patriarch Paul I may refer to:

- Paul I of Constantinople, Patriarch in 337–339, 341–342 and 346–350
- Patriarch Paul of Alexandria, Greek Patriarch of Alexandria in 537–542
- Paul I, Serbian Patriarch, Archbishop of Peć and Serbian Patriarch c. 1530 to 1541
- Paul Peter Massad, Maronite Patriarch of Antioch in 1854–1890
- Pavle, Serbian Patriarch, 44th Patriarch of the Serbian Orthodox Church, in 1990–2009

== See also ==
- Paul I (disambiguation)
