= Paul Casey (disambiguation) =

Paul Casey is a British golfer.

Paul Casey may also refer to:

- Paul Casey (Gaelic footballer) (born 1981), Irish Gaelic footballer
- Paul Casey (footballer, born 1961), English association footballer
- Paul Casey (footballer, born 1969), English goalkeeper
- Paul Casey (musician) (born 1974), Irish singer, guitarist and songwriter
- Paul C. Casey, American politician from Massachusetts

== See also ==
- Paul Kasey (born 1973), English actor
