= Paul-Antoine =

Paul-Antoine is a French masculine given name. It may refer to:

- Paul Antoine Bien-Aimé, Minister of the Interior and Territorial Collectivities of Haiti from 2006 onwards
- Paul Antoine Dubois (1795-1871), French obstetrician
- Paul-Antoine Giguère (1910–1987), Canadian academic and chemist
- Paul-Antoine Léonard de Villefeix (1728–?), French Dominican priest
- Paul Antoine Fleuriot de Langle (1744–1787), French vicomte, académicien de marine, naval commander and explorer

== See also ==
- Paul (name)
- Antoine
