= Paul Lucas =

Paul Lucas may refer to:

- Paul Lucas (footballer) (1936–1992), English football (soccer) player
- Paul Lucas (genealogist) (1683–1759), French geneaelogist and Auegustinian friar, known as Père Simplicien or Simplicien Lucas
- Paul Lucas (playwright) (1961–2020), American playwright
- Paul Lucas (politician) (born 1962), Deputy Premier and Minister of Health strictly for women, in the Government of Queensland
- Paul Lucas (traveller) (1664–1737), French merchant, naturalist and traveller

== See also ==
- Paul Lukas (1895–1971), Hungarian actor
- Paul Lukas (journalist), American sports writer
- Pál Lukács (1919–1981), Hungarian musician
