= Paul Carey =

Paul Carey may refer to:

- Paul Carey (baseball) (born 1968), baseball player
- Paul Carey (broadcaster) (1928–2016), American broadcaster and sportscaster
- Paul Carey (ice hockey) (born 1988), American ice hockey player
- Paul Carey (politician) (1962–2001), White House Special Assistant to U.S. President Bill Clinton
- Paul Carey (cricketer) (1920–2009), English cricketer
- Paul Carey (hurler) (1978–2020), Irish hurler
