= Paul Jennings =

Paul Jennings may refer to:

- Paul Jennings (Australian author) (born 1943), Australian children's author
- Paul Jennings (British author) (1918–1989), British humorist
- Paul Jennings (cyclist) (born 1970), British racing cyclist
- Paul Jennings (union worker) (1918–1987), American labor leader, president of the International Union of Electrical Workers
- Paul Jennings (voice-over artist), Melbourne mimic who performed the voices in Rubbery Figures, a political satire
- Paul Jennings (abolitionist) (1799–1874), African-American slave of James Madison
- Paul Jennings (darts player) (born 1976), English darts player
