= Paul Lewis =

Paul Lewis may refer to:

== Sports ==
- Paul Lewis (field hockey) (born 1966), Australian field hockey player
- Paul Lewis (footballer) (born 1994), British association footballer
- Paul Lewis (racing driver) (1932–2025), American NASCAR driver

== Others ==
- Paul Lewis (architect) (born 1966), American architect and professor at the Princeton University School of Architecture
- Paul Lewis (broadcaster) (born 1948), British radio broadcaster and financial journalist
- Paul Lewis (journalist) (born 1981), British newspaper journalist
- Paul Lewis (professor) (born 1949), American professor of literature
- Paul Lewis (pianist) (born 1972), English classical pianist
- Paul Lewis (politician), Montserratian politician
- Paul A. Lewis (1879–1929), American pathologist at the University of Pennsylvania and the Rockefeller Institute
- Paul H. Lewis (born 1937), professor of political science at Tulane University
- Paul M. Lewis (car builder) (died 1990), American entrepreneur and car builder
- Paul M. Lewis (diplomat), appointed to help shut down the Guantanamo prison
