= Paul Khoury (disambiguation) =

Paul Khoury is a Lebanese-Australian television personality and voice talent.

Paul Khoury may also refer to:

- Paul Khoury (rugby league) (born 1977), Lebanese rugby league international player
- Paul Afeaki Khoury (born 1968), Lebanese-Tongan basketball player
- Paul Khoury (philosopher), Lebanese philosopher who edited the works of Paul of Antioch for publication
