= Paul A. Gagnon =

Paul A. Gagnon (1925–2005) was an American historian and educator. He taught European history at the University of Massachusetts, Amherst during the 1950s, helped establish the University of Massachusetts, Boston in 1964, and promoted national efforts for social studies and secondary education reforms in the 1980s and 1990s.

== Early life and education ==
Born in Springfield, Massachusetts, Gagnon attended the High School of Commerce and then enrolled in the United States Navy, where he served during World War II. He earned his B.A. from the University of Massachusetts at Amherst in 1950 and began teaching European history there as he continued with his graduate studies. He married in 1960, which was also the year he earned his doctorate in modern European history from Harvard University.

== Career ==
Gagnon served as the founding Dean of Arts and Sciences at the University of Massachusetts at Boston from the years 1965 to 1970.

After retiring from the University of Massachusetts, Gagnon began a second phase of his career focused on education and curriculum reform. He worked closely with the American Federation of Teachers, with whom he published Education for Democracy: A Statement for Principles, which was signed by over 100 other educators and historians. He was the principal investigator with the Bradley Commission on History in Schools, which was formed by a group of prominent historians, including Diane Ravitch. Funded by the Lynde and Harry Bradley Foundation, the Bradley Commission released a pamphlet in 1988, "Building a History Curriculum", which proposed a series of resolutions and a program for the study of history in K-12 American schools, and a book, Historical Literacy, published in 1989 and edited by Gagnon.

Gagnon was the first executive director of the National Council for History Education. He served in the Department of Education from 1991 to 1994 as Director of the Fund for the Improvement and Reform of Schools and Teaching (FIRST).

== Writings and statements on history education ==
- Education for Democracy: A Statement of Principles (Education for Democracy Project, American Federation of Teachers, 1987)
- Democracy's Un-Told Story: What World History Textbooks Neglect (Education for Democracy Project, American Federation of Teachers, 1987)
- Democracy's Half-Told Story: What American Textbooks Should Add (Education for Democracy Project, American Federation of Teachers, 1989)
- Historical Literacy: The Case for History in American Education (1989)
- "Why Study History," Atlantic (Nov. 1989)
- "What Should Children Learn?" (December 1995)
- "Educating Democracy: Are We Up To It?" Occasional Paper for National Council for History Education (2005)
