= Paul Brooks (disambiguation) =

Paul Brooks may refer to:

- Paul Brooks, British-born film producer
- Paul Brooks (cricketer) (1921–1946), English cricketer
- Paul Brooks (writer) (1909–1998), nature writer, book editor, and environmentalist

== See also ==
- Paul Broks, English neuropsychologist and science writer
- Paul Brook, British presenter, author, mentalist and online streamer
- Paul Brooke, (born 1944), English retired actor of film, television and radio
