= Paul D. Bevis =

American politician (1884–1976)

Member of the Florida House of Representatives from Jackson County
- In office 1929

Personal details
- Born: December 15, 1884
- Died: March 23, 1976 (aged 91)
- Party: Democratic
- Education: University of Florida

Paul D. Bevis (December 15, 1884 – March 23, 1976) was an American politician. He served as a Democratic member of the Florida House of Representatives.

== Life and career ==
Bevis attended Florida Normal School and the University of Florida.

Bevis served in the Florida House of Representatives in 1929.

Bevis died on March 23, 1976, at the age of 91.
