= Paul Peters =

Paul Peters may refer to:

- Paul Peters (mayor) (born 1942), Dutch politician, mayor of multiple municipalities
- Paul Peters (politician, 1942–2024), Dutch academic and politician, member of the Senate of the Netherlands
- Paul Evan Peters (1947–1996), American librarian
- Paul Peters (publisher) (born 1982), American publisher
- Paul Douglas Peters, person convicted after 2011 Australian bomb hoax
