= R. Paul Robertson =

American endocrinologist

R. Paul Robertson is an American endocrinologist and former president and scientific director of the Pacific Northwest Diabetes Research Institute (PNDRI). He is a professor of medicine at the University of Minnesota. Robertson was the 2009 president, Medicine & Science of the Volunteer Board for the American Diabetes Association. His research interests focus on glucose regulation of pancreatic islet gene expression and the abnormal consequences on gene expression caused by glucose toxicity. He is also involved in metabolic studies of type 1 diabetic patients who have successfully received pancreas and pancreatic islet transplantation (see Edmonton Protocol). He was elected to be the editor-in-chief for the Journal of Clinical Endocrinology and Metabolism (JCEM) of the Endocrine Society (United States) beginning January 2015.
