= Paul Wong =

Paul Wong may refer to:

- Paul Wong (artist) (born 1954), Canadian artist
- Paul Wong (musician) (born 1964), Hong Kong musician
- Paul T. P. Wong (1937–2024), Canadian psychologist
