= Paul Tanner (disambiguation) =

Paul Tanner (1917–2013) was an American musician and member of the Glenn Miller Orchestra.

Paul Tanner may also refer to:

- J. Paul Tanner (born 1950), dean of the Arab Center for Biblical Studies
- Paul Francis Tanner (1905–1994), American clergyman of the Roman Catholic bishop
