= Paul Rose =

Paul Rose is the name of:

- Paul Lawrence Rose (1944–2014), American professor of European history and Jewish studies
- Paul Rose (writer) (born 1971), British video games journalist and screenwriter
- Paul Rose (born 1979), electronic music producer more commonly known as Scuba
- Paul Rose (political figure) (1943–2013), Front de Liberation du Quebec member who was convicted of the murder of Pierre Laporte
- Paul Rose (rugby league) (born 1952), rugby league footballer
- Paul Rose (TV presenter) (born 1951), TV presenter and explorer
- Paul Rose (British politician) (1935–2015), British Labour MP
- Paul Howard Rose (1880–1955), founder of Roses Stores
- Biff Rose (Paul Rose, 1937–2023), American comedian and singer-songwriter
- Paul Rose (American politician), member of the Tennessee Senate
