= Paul Craig (disambiguation) =

Paul Craig (born 1987) is a Scottish mixed martial artist.

Paul Craig may also refer to:

- Paul Craig (politician) (1920–2005), American politician in Iowa
- Paul Craig (legal scholar) (born 1951), professor of English law
- Paul Craig (runner) (born 1953), Canadian middle-distance runner
- Paul Craig (soccer) (born 1988), Canadian soccer player
- Paul Craig (dancer), American principal ballet dancer
