= Paul I =

Paul I may refer to:

- Paul of Samosata (200–275), Bishop of Antioch
- Paul I of Constantinople (died c. 350), Archbishop of Constantinople
- Pope Paul I (700–767)
- Paul I Šubić of Bribir (c. 1245–1312), Ban of Croatia and Lord of Bosnia
- Paul I, Serbian Patriarch, Archbishop of Peć and Serbian Patriarch (c. 1530–1541)
- Paul I of Russia (1754–1801), Emperor of Russia
- Paul Peter Massad (1806–1890), Maronite Patriarch of Antioch
- Paul of Greece (1901–1964), King of Greece
- Pavle, Serbian Patriarch (1914–2009), Patriarch of the Serbian Orthodox Church

== See also ==
- Patriarch Paul I (disambiguation)
