= Paul Stein =

Paul Stein may refer to:

- Paul Stein (entomologist) (1852–1921), German museum curator and entomologist
- Paul E. Stein (1944–2002), superintendent of the United States Air Force Academy
- Paul L. Stein (1892–1951), Austro-British film director
- Paul Stein (judge) (1939–2024), Australian judge
