= Paul Ritter (disambiguation) =

Paul Ritter (1966–2021) was a British stage and screen actor.

Paul Ritter may also refer to:

- Paul Ritter (painter) (1829–1907), German architectural painter and etcher
- Paul Ritter (diplomat) (1865–1921), Ambassador of Switzerland to the United States
- Paul Ritter (architect) (1925–2010), a Western Australian architect, town planner, sociologist, artist and author

== See also ==
- Ritter (surname)
