= Paul Ehrlich (disambiguation) =

Paul Ehrlich (1854–1915) was a German scientist and physician.

Paul Ehrlich may also refer to:

- Paul R. Ehrlich (1932–2026), American biologist and commentator on world population
- S. Paul Ehrlich Jr. (1932–2005), American physician and public health administrator

== See also ==
- Paul Erlich (born 1972), American music theorist
