= Paul Kemp =

Paul Kemp is the name of:

- Paul S. Kemp, American fantasy author
- Paul Kemp (American football) (1931–2014), former American football player, coach, and scout
- Paul Kemp (actor) (1896–1953), German film actor
- Paul Kemp (footballer) (1930–?), Luxembourgish footballer
- Paul Kemp, a fictional character in Hunter S. Thompson's novel The Rum Diary
