= Paul N. Yu =

American physician

- Born: 1915
- Known for: Contributions to cardiac physiology

Paul N. Yu (1915 – October 8, 1991) was an American cardiologist, physician-scientist and educator of Chinese descent, and a product of Chinese, British and American medical education. Over a career spanning several decades he trained numerous individuals in clinical cardiology who went on to leadership positions in academia throughout this country.

== Early life ==
Yu was born and raised in China.

== Career ==
Yu performed pioneering research in cardiac physiology, making seminal observations about the pulmonary circulation in health and disease, and the relationship to ventricular function, and key observations about the care of patients with coronary artery disease. He cared for prominent individuals such as the Taiwanese president Chiang Kai-shek and his family. He served in numerous leadership roles during his career, including a term as President of the American Heart Association (1972-3). Subsequently, he was awarded the American Heart Association's prestigious James Bryan Herrick Award for distinguished service to clinical cardiology during the course of his career. Yu served on the editorial boards of the American Heart Journal, Circulation and the Journal of Electrocardiology and was a senior editor of Modern Concepts of Cardiovascular Disease, co-editor of the 16-volume Progress in Cardiology and author of the textbook Pulmonary Blood Volume in Health and Disease.

The Paul N. Yu Professorship of Cardiology at the University of Rochester was first awarded to Bradford C. Berk, MD, PhD, who was the Chair of Medicine, and served as Chief of the Cardiology Unit, and Director of the Center for Cardiovascular Research until 2002. The current Chief of Cardiology, Spencer Z. Rosero, M.D., M.S. holds the Paul N. Yu Professorship of Cardiology. The Paul N. Yu Heart Center contains clinical inpatient and outpatient facilities for the treatment of cardiovascular disease at Strong Memorial Hospital, with Nuclear Cardiology, Echocardiography, Electrophysiology, Interventional Cardiology Laboratories as well as Cardiac Rehabilitation facilities.

== Death ==
Yu died in 1991 in Taiwan.

== Selected bibliography ==
- "Progress in cardiology," ed. by Paul N. Yu. Philadelphia, Lea & Febiger, Volumes 1 - 16, 1972 - 1988 (Yearly).
- "Pulmonary blood volume in health and disease," by Paul N. Yu. Philadelphia, Lea & Febiger, 1969.
