= Paul Erickson =

Paul Erickson may refer to:

- Paul Erickson (screenwriter) (1920–1991)
- Paul Erickson (baseball) (1915–2002)
- Paul Erickson (activist) (born 1962), American conservative political operative
- Paul Erickson (trade unionist), incumbent National Secretary of the Australian Labor Party

== See also ==
- Paul Eriksson (born 1991), ice hockey player
