= Paul Alexander =

Paul Alexander may refer to:

- Paul Alexander (British writer), British comedy writer
- Paul Alexander, former surgeon-general of Australia's Joint Health Command
- Paul E. Alexander, Canadian health researcher
- Paul Lir Alexander (born c. 1956), Brazilian drug lord
- Paul Alexander (American football) (born 1960), American coach
- Paul Alexander (artist) (1937–2021), American commercial artist and illustrator
- Paul Alexander (polio survivor) (1946–2024), American lawyer and paralytic polio survivor
- Paul Jacob Alexander (1904–1969), newspaper publisher and Seattle City Councilman
- Paul Alexander, musician with the American folk rock band Midlake
