= Paul Hill =

Paul Hill is the name of:

- Paul Hill (musician) (1934–1999), American music director, founder of the Master Chorale of Washington (formerly the Paul Hill Chorale)
- Paul Jennings Hill (1954–2003), the murderer of abortion provider John Britton
- Paul Hill (Guildford Four) (born 1954), Irish man convicted and later cleared of terrorist offences
- Paul Hill (flight director) (born 1962), American flight director for NASA Mission Control Center
- Paul Hill (rugby union) (born 1995), English rugby union player
- Paul Andrew Raymond Clegg-Hill (born 1979), heir apparent to the British title of Viscount Hill
- Paul R. Hill (1909–1990), American aerodynamicist
