= Paul Berg (disambiguation) =

Paul Berg (1926–2023) was an American biochemist and Nobel laureate.

Paul Berg also refers to:

- Paul Berg (composer), Dutch professor of music
- Paul Berg (snowboarder) (born 1991), German snowboarder
- Paul Berg (photographer), American photojournalist

== See also ==
- Paul Bergé (1881–1970), American symphony conductor
