= Paul Gross (disambiguation) =

Paul Gross (born 1959) is a Canadian actor, producer, director, singer and writer.

Paul Gross may also refer to:

- Paul Magnus Gross (1895–1986), American chemist and educator
- Paul R. Gross, American biologist and author
