= Paul A. Toth =

American poet

- Born: 1964 (age 61–62); Flint, Michigan, U.S.
- Occupations: Novelist; short story writer

Paul A. Toth (born 1964) is an American novelist and short story writer. He is the author of four novels, Fizz (Bleak House Books, 2004), Fishnet (Bleak House Books, 2005), Finale (Raw Dog Screaming Press, 2009), and Airplane Novel (Raw Dog Screaming Press, 2011). His work has appeared in numerous publications and websites.

== Biography ==
Toth was born in 1964 in Flint, Michigan and has lived in Los Angeles, Washington, D.C., Denver, and Sarasota, Florida. He has an MA in Communication and Leadership.

== Early work ==
Toth's early work consists of short stories, over 150 of which have been published. Themes include the persistence of self-doubt regarding identity, a sense of being lost amongst objects, and a clutching for reality that almost always fails. Toth's short stories, as well as his nonfiction, poetry, and multimedia work, can be accessed via his web portal.

== Novels ==
Fizz, Fishnet and Finale comprise a nonchronlogical trilogy, each volume considering identity in the shadow of unwitting self-deception.

Airplane Novel reframes the "events of 9/11" from the perspective of the South Tower, which creates an inside-out viewpoint otherwise beyond knowledge.

In his review, New York Times and Newsweek journalist Dan Newland wrote, "Airplane Novel is, without a doubt, the most extraordinary of all books published to date on the destruction by terrorists of the World Trade Center on September 11, 2001. His book tells a truly intimate inside story of the rise and fall of the Twin Towers that cuts through the hype and emotive rhetoric...Objective, clear-headed and big-picture focused, this is a book that will change the outlook of many a reader regarding the 9/11 tragedy."
