= Paul Webster =

Paul Webster may refer to:

- Paul Webster (jazz) (1909–1966), American big band musician
- Paul Webster (journalist) (born 1954), British journalist, editor of The Observer
- Paul Webster (producer) (born 1952), British film producer
- Paul Francis Webster (1907–1984), American lyricist
- Paul Webster, character in the 1959 film The Alligator People
