= Paul Walsh (disambiguation) =

Paul Walsh is an English former professional footballer and sports television pundit

Paul Walsh may also refer to:

- Paul Walsh (Gaelic footballer) (born 1998), Irish Gaelic footballer
- Paul Walsh (priest) (1885–1941), Irish priest and historian
- Paul Walsh (singer), lead singer of Irish band Royseven
- Paul Henry Walsh (1937–2014), American prelate of the Roman Catholic Church
- Paul S. Walsh (born 1955), former CEO of Diageo (2000–2013)
