= Paul Coffey (disambiguation) =

Paul Coffey (born 1961) is a Canadian ice hockey player.

Paul Coffey may also refer to:

- Paul Coffey (businessman) (born 1969), British businessman
- Paul Coffey (judge) (fl. 1980s–2020s), Irish lawyer who was appointed a Judge of the High Court

== See also ==
- Paul Coffee (born 1956), American soccer goalkeeper
