= Paul Weller (disambiguation) =

Paul Weller (born 1958) is an English musician.

Paul Weller may also refer to:

- Paul Weller (politician) (born 1959), Australian state MP
- Paul Weller (footballer) (born 1975), English midfielder
- Paul Weller (album), Weller's 1992 debut album
