= Paul Reynolds =

Paul Reynolds may refer to:

- Paul Reynolds (actor) (born 1970), British actor
- Paul Reynolds (BBC journalist) (born 1946), BBC's World Affairs correspondent
- Paul Reynolds (commentator) (1949–2010), Scottish-New Zealand internet commentator
- Paul Reynolds (cricketer) (born 1936), South African cricketer
- Paul Reynolds (musician) (born 1962), guitarist for early '80s synth pop band A Flock of Seagulls
- Paul Reynolds (RTÉ journalist), Irish crime correspondent
- Paul Reynolds (umpire) (1973–2023), Irish cricket umpire
- Paul D. Reynolds (1963–2015), Canadian investment banker
- Sled Reynolds, animal trainer for animals in film
- Paul Reynolds (badminton), member of the Ireland national badminton team
