= Paul Hopkins =

Paul Hopkins may refer to:

- Paul Hopkins (baseball) (1904–2004), right-handed relief pitcher in Major League Baseball
- Paul Hopkins (actor) (born 1968), Canadian television, film and theatre actor
- Paul Hopkins (footballer) (born 1986), English former footballer
- Paul Hopkins (pilot) (1951–2014), chief test pilot of British Aerospace in the late 1990s
