= Paul Casey (footballer, born 1969) =

English footballer

Personal information
- Full name: Paul Casey
- Date of birth: 29 July 1969 (age 57)
- Place of birth: Great Yarmouth, England
- Position: Goalkeeper

Youth career
- Cambridge United

Senior career*
Years	Team	Apps	(Gls)
1987–1988	Cambridge United	1	(0)
1988–1990	Chelmsford City	86	(0)
- Harwich & Parkeston
- Brantham Athletic
- Norwich United
- Halstead Town
- Great Yarmouth Town
- Gorleston

Managerial career
- 2019: Gorleston (joint-caretaker)
- * Club domestic league appearances and goals

Paul Casey (born 29 July 1969) is an English former footballer who played as a goalkeeper.

== Career ==
After progressing through the club's academy, Casey made his Cambridge United debut in the 1987–88 season. After a singular Football League appearance for Cambridge, Casey joined Chelmsford City, where he made 111 appearances in all competitions. Following time at Chelmsford, Casey played for Harwich & Parkeston, Brantham Athletic and Norwich United before signing for Halstead Town in 1993. Casey later signed for hometown club Great Yarmouth Town, and Gorleston.

In September 2019, Casey, alongside Darren Cockrill, took temporary charge of Gorleston in a 1–1 draw against Hadleigh United.
