= Paul Watson (disambiguation) =

Paul Watson (born 1950) is a Canadian environmental activist, ship's skipper, and founder of the Sea Shepherd Conservation Society.

Paul Watson may also refer to:

- Paul Watson (basketball) (born 1994) American basketball player
- Paul Watson (cyclist) (born 1962), former professional English road racing cyclist
- Paul Watson (documentary filmmaker) (1942–2023), English filmmaker
- Paul Watson (footballer, born 1975), English football player
- Paul Watson (footballer, born 1990), Scottish football player
- Paul Watson (football manager) (born 1984), British sports journalist and expatriate football coach
- Paul Watson (journalist) (born 1959), Canadian photojournalist and author
- Paul Watson (musician) (1952–2024), American cornetist and songwriter
- Paul E. Watson (died 1943), American electrical engineer
- Paul Joseph Watson (born 1982), British right-wing YouTuber, radio host, writer and conspiracy theorist
