= Paul Schmidt =

Paul Schmidt may refer to:

- Paul Schmidt (footballer) (1917–1961), Australian rules footballer
- Paul Schmidt (interpreter) (1899–1970), German interpreter for Adolf Hitler
- Paul Schmidt (inventor) (1898–1976), German engineer and inventor
- Paul Schmidt (runner) (born 1931), German middle-distance runner
- Paul Schmidt (stabbing victim) (198?–2023), Canadian homicide victim
- Paul Schmidt (translator) (1934–1999), American translator, poet, playwright, and essayist
- Paul Felix Schmidt (1916–1984), chess International Master and chess writer
- Paul Gerhard Schmidt (1937–2010), German medievalist and professor of medieval Latin philology
- Paul Karl Schmidt alias Paul Carell (1911–1997), chief press spokesman for Nazi Germany's Foreign Ministry and later purchaser author
- Paul Wilhelm Schmidt (1845–1917), German theologian
- Paul Schmidt (computer programmer), president of the software company Photodex
- Paul Schmidt (politician) (born 1966), German politician

== See also ==
- Paul Schmidtberger, author of Design Flaws of the Human Condition
- Paul Schmid, member of the Massachusetts House of Representatives
