= Paul Hoover =

Paul Hoover may refer to:

- Paul Hoover (poet) (born 1946), American poet
- Paul Hoover (baseball) (born 1976), American baseball player
