= Paul Bie-Eyene =

Gabonese diplomat

Paul Marie Bie-Eyene
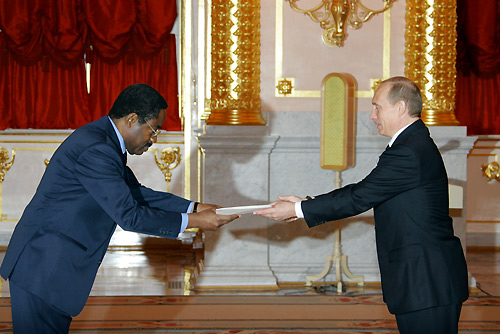
- Paul Bie-Eyene presents his letter of credential as ambassador of the Republic of Gabon to Vladimir Putin, November 8, 2005 ST ALEXANDER HALL, Kremlin.

Ambassador of Gabon to Angola
- In office 1996 – October 26, 2000
- Succeeded by: François Mouely Koumba

Ambassador of Gabon to South Africa
- In office October 26, 2000 – June 30, 2005
- Preceded by: Feu Jacques Ehoumba
- Succeeded by: Marcel J. Odongui-Bonnard

Ambassador of Gabon to Russia
- In office November 8, 2005 – 2009
- Succeeded by: Rene Makonga; Рене Маконго; April 20, 2016: Johanna Rose Mamiaka

Secrétaire Général of the Ministère des Affaires Etrangères Gabún
- In office 2009 – June 29, 2012
- Succeeded by: Henri BEKALE AKWE

Paul Bie-Eyene is a Gabonese diplomat.

- From 1996 till August 25, 2000 he was Ambassador Extraordinary and Plenipotentiary in Luanda.
- From October 26, 2000 till June 30, 2005 he was Ambassador Extraordinary and Plenipotentiary in Pretoria.
- From November 8, 2005 till 2009 he was Ambassador Extraordinary and Plenipotentiary in Moscow the Russian Federation.
- From 2009 till June 29, 2012 he was Secrétaire Général of the Ministère des Affaires Etrangères Gabún.
- In the Gabonese legislative election, 2011 he became member of the National Assembly of Gabon as a candidate of the Gabonese Democratic Party 12e Législature (2012-2017)
