= Paul Weiss =

Paul Weiss may refer to:

- Paul, Weiss, Rifkind, Wharton & Garrison, U.S. law firm
- Paul Weiss (mathematician) (1911–1991), German and British mathematician and theoretical physicist
- Paul Weiss (nanoscientist) (born 1959), American nanoscientist
- Paul Weiss (philosopher) (1901–2002), American philosopher
- Paul Alfred Weiss (1898–1989), Austrian biologist

== See also ==
- Paul Weis (1907–1991), Austrian lawyer and survivor of Nazi persecution
