= Paul Healy =

Paul Healy may refer to:

- Paul Healy (rugby union), former player and current rugby union coach
- Paul M. Healy, American business academic
- Paul F. Healy, academic who has investigated the Caracol Mayan archaeological site
