= Paul Epstein (disambiguation) =

Paul Epstein (1871–1939) was a German mathematician.

Paul Epstein may also refer to:

- Paul Sophus Epstein (1883–1966), Russian-American mathematical physicist
- Paul A. Epstein, member of Relâche (musical group)

== See also ==
- Paul Eppstein German sociologist
