= Paul Franklin =

Paul Franklin may refer to:

- Paul Franklin (American football) (1906–1959), running back for the Chicago Bears
- Paul Franklin (footballer) (born 1963), association football player and coach
- Paul Franklin (musician) (born 1954), American multi-instrumentalist and regular player with Mark Knopfler and Dire Straits
- Paul Franklin (visual effects supervisor), who gained recognition for work on the films The Dark Knight and Inception
- Paul Franklin (screenwriter) (1899–1980), film and television writer known for Torpedo Boat (1942), Trouble in Morocco (1937) and Outlaws of the Orient (1937)

== See also ==
- Joseph Paul Franklin (1950–2013), American serial killer
