= Paul Adomites =

American historian

Paul D. Adomites was an American baseball and oil historian, author, and Society for American Baseball Research former member who has written or contributed to many books, and written many articles on subjects from jazz and food to science fiction and old-time radio.

== Partial list of books authored or co-authored ==
- Oil Fields, Oil People (2012)
- Pennsylvania Crude (2010)
- October's Game (1990)
- The Cooperstown Review: The Forum of Baseball Literary Opinion (1993)
- Babe Ruth: His Life and Times (1995)
- Baseball in Pittsburgh (1995)
- The Best of Baseball (1996)
- Cooperstown: Hall of Fame Players (multiple editions)
- Sluggers! (2001)
- The Love of Baseball (2005)
- Armchair Reader: Grand Slam Baseball (2007)
- Extra Innings Baseball: All-Star Stories, Stats, Lore & Legends (2009)

(from GoodReads.com)
