= Paul Stanley (disambiguation) =

Paul Stanley (born 1952) is an American musician and co-founder of the band Kiss.

Paul Stanley may also refer to:

- Paul Stanley (album), the musician's 1978 solo album
- Paul Stanley (actor), Mexican actor and television host
- Paul Stanley (basketball) (born 1963), American basketball player
- Paul Stanley (composer) (1848–1909), German-born American composer and vaudeville comedian
- Paul Stanley (director) (1922–2002), American television director
- Paul Stanley (legislator) (born 1962), American politician and former member of the Tennessee Senate
- Paul Stanley (speed skater) (born 1983), British Olympic speed skater

== See also ==
- Stanley Paul, British publishing firm
