= Paul Shields =

Paul Shields is the name of:

- Paul Shields (American football) (born 1976), American football player
- Paul Shields (footballer) (born 1981), Scottish footballer
- Paul Shields (rugby union) (born 1978), Irish rugby union footballer
- Paul Shields (actor), actor in the film Lansdown
