= Paul Willis (disambiguation) =

Paul Willis (born 1950) is a British cultural theorist.

Paul Willis may also refer to:

- Paul Willis (actor) (1901–1960), American child actor of the silent film era
- Paul Willis (cricketer) (born 1952), English cricketer
- Paul Willis (English footballer) (1970–2011), English football midfielder
- Paul Willis (science communicator), Australian paleontologist and science communicator
- Paul Willis (Scottish footballer) (born 1991), Scottish football midfielder
- Paul K. Willis (1947–1999), Canadian sketch comedian and television/radio writer
