= Paul Verhoeven (disambiguation) =

Paul Verhoeven (born 1938) is a Dutch film director.

Paul Verhoeven may also refer to:

- Paul Verhoeven (German director) (1901–1975), German actor and director
- Paul Verhoeven (broadcaster) (born 1983), Australian radio and television personality
