= Paul Clifford (disambiguation) =

Paul Clifford is an 1830 novel.

Paul Clifford may also refer to:

- Paul Clifford, member of the British band The Wonder Stuff
- Paul Clifford (cricketer) (born 1976), cricketer
- Paul Clifford (politician), Vermont state legislator
