= Paul Hudson (disambiguation) =

Paul Hudson may refer to:

- Paul Hudson (born 1971), British journalist
- Paul Hudson (footballer) (born 1970), Australian athlete
- Paul Hudson (businessman) (born 1967), British chief executive
- Paul D. Hudson (born 1956), frontman of the American band Bad Brains
