= Paul Tucker =

Paul Tucker may refer to:

- Paul Hayes Tucker (born 1950), American art historian, professor, curator, and author
- Sir Paul Tucker (banker) (born 1958), British banker
- Paul Tucker (musician) (born 1965), British musician, creator and member of the band Lighthouse Family
- Paul Tucker (athlete) (born 1976), Guyanese Olympic hurdler
- Paul Tucker (artist) (born 1981), Canadian comic book artist
- Paul Tucker (politician), American politician, member of the Massachusetts House of Representatives
