= Paul Cameron (disambiguation) =

Paul Cameron (born 1939) is an American psychologist.

Paul Cameron may also refer to:

- Paul Cameron (New Zealand footballer), association football player
- Paul Cameron (cinematographer) (born 1958), American cinematographer
- Paul Cameron (gridiron football) (1932–2023), American football player
- Paul Cameron (Australian footballer) (1904–1978), Australian rules footballer
- Paul C. Cameron, American judge, railroad builder, and slaveholder
