= Paul Russell (dancer) =

American classical ballet dancer and artistic director (1947–1991)

- Born: Paul Lawrence Russell; March 2, 1947; Mineola, Texas, U.S.
- Died: February 15, 1991 (aged 43); San Francisco, California, U.S.
- Education: School of American Ballet
- Alma mater: Kirov Ballet School
- Occupations: Ballet dancer; choreographer; artistic director
- Years active: 1968–1991
- Partner: Randy Griffin (longtime companion)

Paul Lawrence Russell (March 2, 1947 – February 15, 1991) was an American classical ballet dancer, choreographer, and artistic director. He rose to prominence as a principal dancer with the Dance Theatre of Harlem and the San Francisco Ballet. Renowned for his athletic virtuosity and technical bravura, he was one of the few African-American classical ballet dancers of his era to break through racial barriers at major, historically white Western ballet institutions.

Following a career-ending injury, Russell transitioned to artistic leadership, becoming the artistic director of the American Festival Ballet in Idaho. At the time of his appointment, he was one of the few Black directors leading a predominantly white classical ballet company in the United States. He died of AIDS-related complications in 1991.

== Early life and education ==
Russell was born in Mineola, Texas. Drawn to classical dance, he pursued his primary ballet education in New York City, where he trained at the School of American Ballet (SAB). He later continued his training at the newly established Dance Theatre of Harlem School, studying under the guidance of Arthur Mitchell and Karel Shook.

== Career ==
=== Hartford Ballet and Dance Theatre of Harlem (1968–1977) ===
Russell began his professional career with the Hartford Ballet in Connecticut, performing from 1968 until 1971. Seeking a creative space dedicated to dancers of color, he joined the Dance Theatre of Harlem in 1971. He quickly rose through the ranks to become one of the company's leading male principals.

During his tenure in Harlem, Russell achieved critical acclaim for his versatile range, mastering both traditional classical showpieces and contemporary works. He became widely celebrated for his energetic, technically demanding performance in the Le Corsaire pas de deux—frequently partnered with ballerina Susan Lovelle—and his roles in Don Quixote. One of his most enduring signature roles was the lead jazz dancer in Louis Johnson's Forces of Rhythm, a performance praised by critics for blending loose, syncopated street movements with classical lines.

In 1974, Russell scored an international success during the company's tour at London's Sadler's Wells Theatre. He also appeared in popular media, performing on PBS's Vegetable Soup (1975), The Monte Carlo Show, and appearing in the 1977 Sidney Poitier film A Piece of the Action.

=== International studies and European career (1977–1980) ===
In 1977, Russell left the United States for Leningrad, Soviet Union, to study under Soviet ballerina and pedagogue Natalia Dudinskaya at the Kirov Ballet School. Following his time in Russia, Russell relocated to Glasgow, Scotland, to join the Scottish National Ballet. While dancing with the Scottish company, he made history by becoming one of the first African-American men to perform the premier classical role of Prince Siegfried in a full-length production of Swan Lake.

=== San Francisco Ballet (1981–1986) ===
Russell returned to the United States in 1981, joining the San Francisco Ballet as a featured principal dancer under the direction of Lew Christensen and later Helgi Tomasson. His arrival on the West Coast solidified his status as a "cross-over" artist who successfully integrated into predominantly white American ballet rosters. Los Angeles Times dance critics routinely lauded his West Coast performances, noting in an October 1985 review that Russell "flashed and thundered his way through solos... with irresistible nonchalance," striking a balance between masculine virtuosity and delicate dramatic poignancy.

=== Advocacy and artistic direction (1986–1991) ===
Throughout his career, Russell was an active public speaker and educator. He regularly organized and participated in traveling lecture-demonstrations designed to introduce classical Black artists to predominantly white regional audiences, aiming to dismantle systemic racial biases within the fine arts. He spent his off-seasons teaching ballet at both the Dance Theatre of Harlem and San Francisco Ballet schools.

In 1986, a severe hip injury forced Russell to retire from the stage. He redirected his efforts to choreography and administration, and in 1988, he was appointed the artistic director of the American Festival Ballet in Boise, Idaho. He successfully led and expanded the company's regional profile until his health declined.

== Personal life ==
Russell was a gay man. His longtime companion and romantic partner was Randy Griffin. The couple remained together throughout the height of Russell's career, his forced retirement from dance, and his subsequent illness, with Griffin serving as his primary caregiver.

== Death ==
On February 15, 1991, Russell died from complications of AIDS at Davies Medical Center in San Francisco at the age of 43. Griffin ensured their partnership was publicly recorded in major mainstream publications, including The New York Times, the Los Angeles Times, and Variety, which formally acknowledged Griffin as Russell's surviving longtime companion.

== Filmography ==
=== Television ===
Year	Title	Role	Notes
1975	Vegetable Soup	Himself	PBS series
1980	The Monte Carlo Show	Himself	

=== Film ===
Year	Title	Role	Notes
1977	A Piece of the Action	Specialty Dancer	
