= Paul Chan =

Paul Chan may refer to:

- Paul Chan (artist) (born 1973), Hong Kong-born American artist
- Paul Chan Mo-po (born 1955), Hong Kong politician
- Paul Chan Wai-chi (born 1957), Macanese politician
