= Paul Balmer =

Swiss mathematician, working in algebra

- Born: 1970 (age 55–56)
- Education: University of Lausanne
- Awards: Humboldt Prize
- Scientific career
- Fields: Algebra
- Workplaces: UCLA
- Thesis: Groupes de Witt dérivés des schémas (1998)
- Doctoral advisor: Manuel Ojanguren
- Website: www.math.ucla.edu/~balmer

Paul Balmer (born 1970) is a Swiss mathematician working in tensor triangular geometry, algebraic geometry, modular representation theory, and homotopy theory. He is a professor of mathematics at the University of California, Los Angeles.

Balmer received his Ph.D. from the University of Lausanne in 1998, under the supervision of Manuel Ojanguren, with the thesis Groupes de Witt dérivés des Schémas (in French).

His research centers around triangulated categories. More specifically, he is a proponent of tensor-triangular geometry, an umbrella topic that covers geometric aspects of algebraic geometry, modular representation theory, stable homotopy theory, and other areas, by means of relevant tensor-triangulated categories.

Balmer was an Invited Speaker at the International Congress of Mathematicians in Hyderabad in 2010, with a talk on Tensor Triangular Geometry. In 2012, he became a fellow of the American Mathematical Society. He was awarded the Humboldt Prize in 2015.
