= Paul Harvey (disambiguation) =

Paul Harvey (1918–2009) was an American radio broadcaster.

Paul Harvey may also refer to:

- Paul Harvey Jr. (born 1948/49), son of Paul Harvey, also an American radio broadcaster
- Paul H. Harvey (born 1947), British evolutionary biologist
- Paul Harvey (actor) (1882–1955), American film actor
- Paul Harvey (artist) (born 1960), British musician and artist
- Paul Harvey (boxer) (born 1964), English boxer of the 1980s and '90s
- Paul Harvey (diplomat) (1869–1948), British diplomat and compiler of literary reference books
- Paul Harvey (footballer) (born 1968), Scottish footballer
- Paul Harvey (pianist) (born 1940), British pianist and composer
