= Paul Ygartua =

Canadian artist of British birth (born 1945)

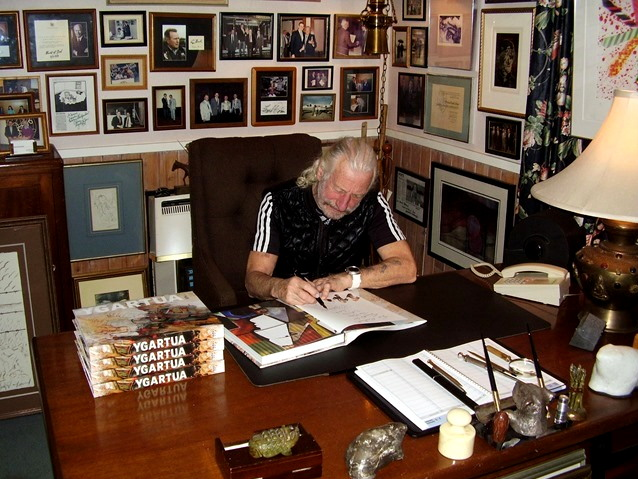
Paul Ygartua (2014). Photo by M.D. Silverbrooke.

Paul Ygartua (born 16 June 1945) is a British-born Canadian painter and draftsman who has worked in numerous styles over the years. He has painted some of the largest murals in Canada and the United States.

== Early life and education ==
Ygartua was born in Bebington, England, a suburb of Liverpool. He graduated from the Liverpool School of Art in 1965 with a degree in Industrial Design (NDD). He immigrated to Vancouver, British Columbia, Canada in 1966.

== Career ==
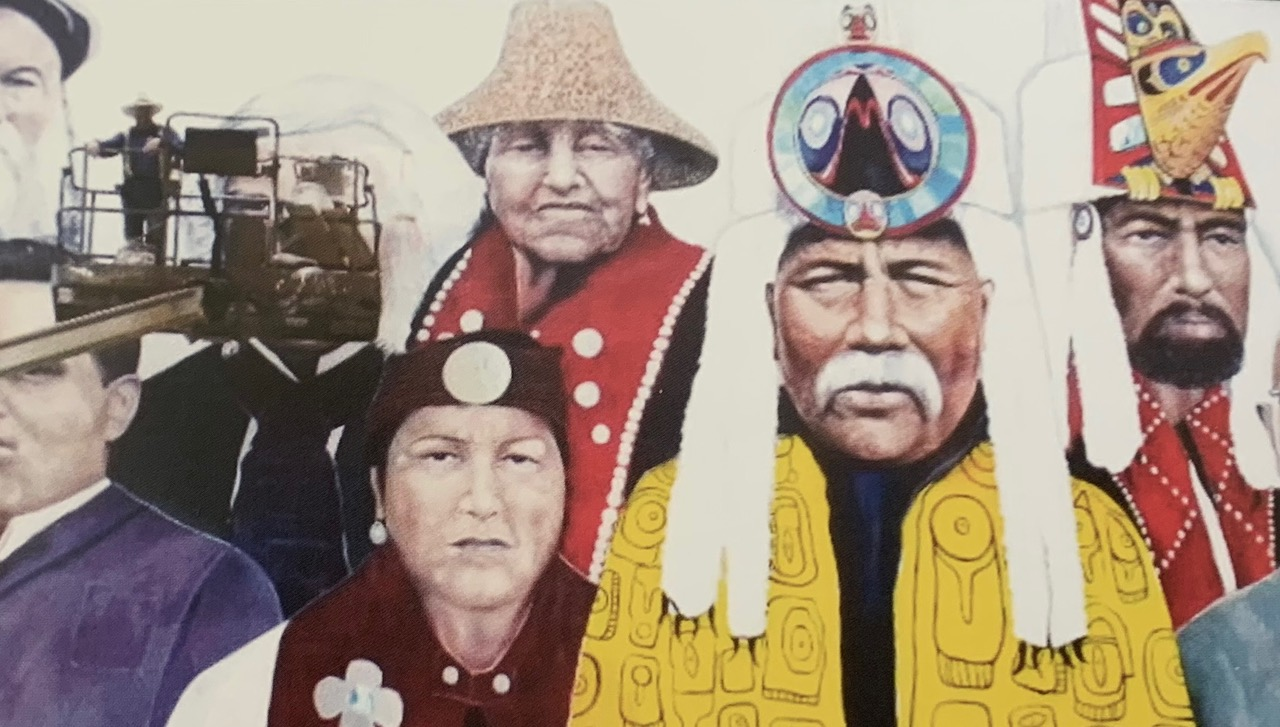
the Heiltsuk Natives -- with the five natives

Ygartua has been a full-time artist since about 1968. He has worked on art projects for extended periods in Berlin, Germany (1968); Acapulco and Cabo San Lucas, Mexico (1971, 1999 and 2000); Crete and Corfu, Greece (1972); Gran Canaria, Canary Islands (1973); Scottsdale, Arizona (1976); New Orleans, Louisiana (1978); Jerusalem, Israel (1980); Honolulu, Hawaii (1981 and 1982); Rio de Janeiro, Brazil (1984); San Juan, Puerto Rico (1985); Quebec City, Canada (1994); Sydney, Australia (2002); and Montreal, Canada (2001). His most frequent work locations away from Vancouver are Cannes and Paris, France; London, England; and Bilbao and Barcelona, Spain.

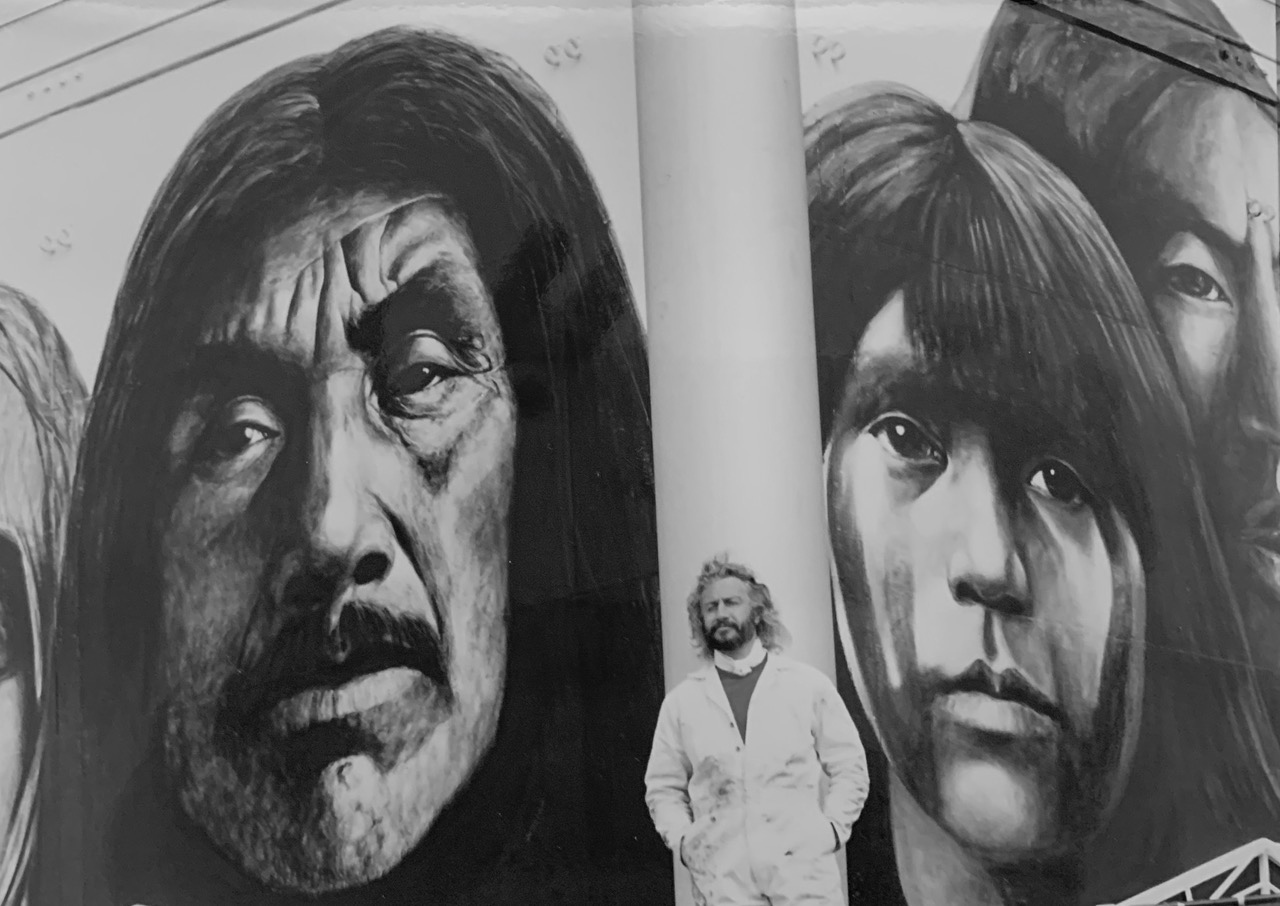
World United 1986 Acrylic on Wall

His mediums include acrylic on canvas, fresco, oil, graphite, pen and ink, pastel, poster, lithograph and mixed mediums. His subjects include portraits, figures, still life, nudes, landscapes, seascapes, cityscapes, social commentary, cultural anthropology, native Indians and pure abstraction, in styles including Realism, Fauvism, Abstract Expressionism and Surrealism.

His murals are illustrated in the books The Expo Celebration: The Official Retrospective Book (1986); Canadian Landmarks and Popular Places (1991); The Chemainus Murals (1993); Canada: Coast to Coast (1998); and The Encyclopedia of British Columbia (2000).

He's exhibited easel paintings with the Federation of Canadian Artists (1979,1981 and 1987); New York Art Expo (1987); Salon d'Automne, Grand Palais, Paris, France (1990, 1992, 1994 and 1995); The Canadian Heritage Art Society (1991); Tokyo Metropolitan Art Museum (1991, 1992 and 1997); Sala de Cultura, Bilbao, Spain (2003); and the Firenze Biennale, Florence, Italy (2005).

The locations of his murals include Waikiki, Hawaii (Rodeo Club, 7 ft X 25 ft – 1981); Chemainus, B.C. (Native Heritage, 25 ft X 50 ft – 1983 and The Hermit, 8 ft X 16 ft – 2008 ); Vancouver, B.C. (EXPO '86 United Nations Pavilion A World United, 30 ft X 100 ft – 1986); Oshawa, Ontario (Oshawa Generals, 15 ft X 35 ft – 1997); Ely, Nevada (United by Our Children, 30 ft X 110 ft – 2001); and Gorliz, Spain (Gorliz Gehituz, 30 ft X 92 ft – 2010).

His largest mural to date Legends of the Millennium/Salute to the Record Breakers is painted on two walls of the Beachcomber Hot Tubs and Spa Factory, located in Surrey B.C. The over 9000 square foot (24 ft X 390 ft) fresco was created by Ygartua in 2000 and restored by him in 2011.

Ygartua's most recent mural Bella Bella – United in History was commissioned by Shearwater Marine Group to commemorate the history of Bella Bella, B.C. The 22' X 120' fresco depicts seventeen important individuals that made a significant contribution to the history of Bella Bella since its founding, by the Hudson's Bay Company, as a trading post in 1833. The mural was entirely drawn and painted by Ygartua, on the side of a World War II airplane hangar on Denny Island, in 20 days (22 May to 10 June 2013).
