= Paul-Louis =

Paul-Louis is a masculine French given name. Notable people with the name include:

- Paul-Louis Carrière (1908-2008), French prelate of the Roman Catholic Church
- Paul-Louis Couchoud (1879-1959), French author and poet
- Paul Louis Courier (1773-1825), French Hellenist and political writer
- Paul-Louis Halley (1934-2003), French businessman
- Paul-Louis Rossi (1933–2025), French critic and poet
- Paul-Louis Roubert (born 1967), associate researcher at the Laboratoire d'histoire visuelle contemporaine
- Paul-Louis Simond (1858-1947), French physician and biologist
- Paul-Louis Weiller (1893-1993), French businessman and industrial
