= Paul French =

Paul French may refer to:

- Paul French (priest) (died 1600), Canon of Windsor
- Paul Comly French (1903–1960), American reporter, writer, anti-war activist and non-profit executive
- Paul French (author) (born 1966), British writer
- Isaac Asimov (1920–1992), who used this pseudonym for the Lucky Starr series of juvenile books
