= Paul Clayton =

Paul Clayton may refer to:

- Paul Clayton (actor) (born 1957), English actor who starred in Peep Show and Him and Her
- Paul Clayton (singer) (1931–1967), American folksinger and folksong collector
- Paul Clayton (footballer) (born 1965), former professional footballer
- Paul Clayton (Coronation Street), character from the British TV soap Coronation Street
