= Paul Dunahoo =

American software entrepreneur

- Occupations: Software developer Entrepreneur; CEO of Bread and Butter Software LLC
- Known for: PAD software Scrawl (app)

Paul Dunahoo is a software developer and technology entrepreneur. He became the CEO of his own startup company called Bread and Butter Software, LLC when he was thirteen years old. He has developed successful applications such as Scrawl, which is considered to be the first note-taking app on the Mac with iCloud sync capabilities.

== Biography ==
In 2008, Dunahoo was already engaged in software development and had founded a company called PAD Software. The startup attempted to develop one-truck and simple applications for Apple devices.

By 2012, Dunahoo had already developed nearly twenty applications, which were sold on the App Store for $2 apiece. Most notable of these applications was Scrawl, a popular note-taking application for the Mac that was the first Mac notes application with iCloud sync capabilities. That year Dunahoo was invited to participate in technical sessions during Apple’s developer conference, WWDC. During the conference, he was still in the eighth grade and was chaperoned by his parents.

Dunahoo later drew attention when he exposed a flaw in the Mac App Store after his account was hacked. When he regained control, he discovered that he could access the store’s online catalog without paying. He then replicated the same process using another account.
