= Paul Briggs =

Paul Briggs may refer to:

- Paul Briggs (boxer) (born 1975), Australian boxer
- Paul Briggs (American football) (1920–2011), American football tackle
- Paul Briggs (animator) (born 1974), American storyboard artist, visual effects animator, and voice actor
