= Patriarch Paul =

Patriarch Paul may refer to:

- Paul I of Constantinople, Patriarch in 337–339, 341–342 and 346–350
- Patriarch Paul of Alexandria, Greek Patriarch of Alexandria in 537–542
- Paul I, Serbian Patriarch, Archbishop of Peć and Serbian Patriarch c. 1530 to 1541
- Paul Peter Massad, Maronite Patriarch of Antioch in 1854–1890
- Pavle, Serbian Patriarch, 44th Patriarch of the Serbian Orthodox Church, in 1990–2009
- Paul II the Black of Alexandria, Patriarch of Antioch and head of the Syriac Orthodox Church in 550–575
- Paul II of Constantinople, Ecumenical Patriarch in 642–653
- Paul II, Serbian Patriarch, Archbishop of Peć and Serbian Patriarch in 1990–2009
- Paul III of Constantinople, Patriarch of Constantinople in 687–693
- Paul IV of Constantinople, Patriarch of Constantinople in 780–784
