= Paul Collins =

Paul Collins may refer to:

== Sports ==
- Paul Collins (end) (1907–1988), American football player
- Paul Collins (quarterback) (1922–2012), American football player
- Paul Collins (runner) (1926–1995), Canadian long-distance runner
- Paul Collins (businessman) (born 1953), New Zealand businessman and sports administrator
- Paul Collins (English footballer) (born 1966), English association football player
- Paul Collins (rugby union, born 1915) (1915–2005), Australian rugby union international player
- Paul Collins (rugby union, born 1959), Irish rugby union international player
- Paul Collins (American Samoan footballer) (born 1997), American Samoan footballer

== Arts and media ==
- Paul Collins (actor) (born 1937), English actor
- Paul Collins (artist) (born 1936), American realist painter
- Paul Collins (Australian religious writer) (born 1940), Australian historian, broadcaster and writer
- Paul Collins (fantasy writer) (born 1954), Australian writer
- Paul Collins (musician) (born 1956), American musician
- Paul Collins (American writer) (born 1969), American writer

== Other ==
- Paul Collins (Brookside), character in Brookside from 1982 to 1990
- The Paul Collins Beat, an American power pop band
