= Paul Owens =

Paul Owens may refer to:

- Paul Owens (baseball) (1924–2003), American baseball executive and manager
- Paul Owens (games programmer), British games programmer
- Paul Owens (gospel singer) (1924–2002), American gospel singer
- Paul Owens (rugby league), rugby league player for Ireland
