= Paul Nash =

Paul Nash may refer to:

- Paul Nash (artist) (1889–1946), British artist
- Paul Nash (athlete) (born 1947), South African sprinter
- Paul Nash (Australian swimmer) (born 1959), Australian swimmer
- Paul Nash (Jamaican swimmer) (born 1943), former Jamaican swimmer
- Paul Nash (musician) (1948-2005), American guitarist
