= Paul Kaye (disambiguation) =

Paul Kaye (born 1964) is an English comedian and actor.

Paul Kaye or Paul Kay may also refer to:

- Paul Kaye (broadcaster) (1934–1980), British radio broadcaster
- Sir Paul Kaye, 5th Baronet (born 1958), of the Kaye baronets
- Paul Kay (born 1934), American linguistics scholar
- Paul Kay (soccer) (born 1962), Australian footballer
