= Paul Daly =

Paul Daly or Paul Daley may refer to:

== Sports ==
- Paul Daly (bowls) (born 1972), Northern Irish lawn bowler
- Paul Daley (born 1983), mixed martial artist
- Paul Daley (rugby league), from List of Halifax R.L.F.C. players
- Paul Daley (footballer) from 1983 FIFA World Youth Championship squads

== Others ==
- Paul Daly (sculptor), Irish sculptor
- Paul Daly (politician) (born 1965), Irish politician
- Paul Daley (musician), musician with Leftfield
- Paul Daly (actor) from The 14

== See also ==
- Paul Dailey Jr. (1915–1990), member of the Wisconsin State Assembly
- Paul Dailly (born 1971), Scottish-Canadian soccer player and coach
