= Paul Rowlett =

English academic (born 1966)

Professor Paul Rowlett is a specialist in French linguistics and was the last head of the School of Humanities, Languages and Social Sciences at Salford University. He is also the editor of the Philological Society's peer-reviewed linguistics journal Transactions of the Philological Society and a member of the editorial board of the Journal of French Language Studies. He is the author of three books: The Syntax of French (2007), The French Language Today: A Linguistic Introduction (2000) and Sentential Negation in French (1998).
