= Paul Lukas (journalist) =

American writer, creator of "Uni Watch"

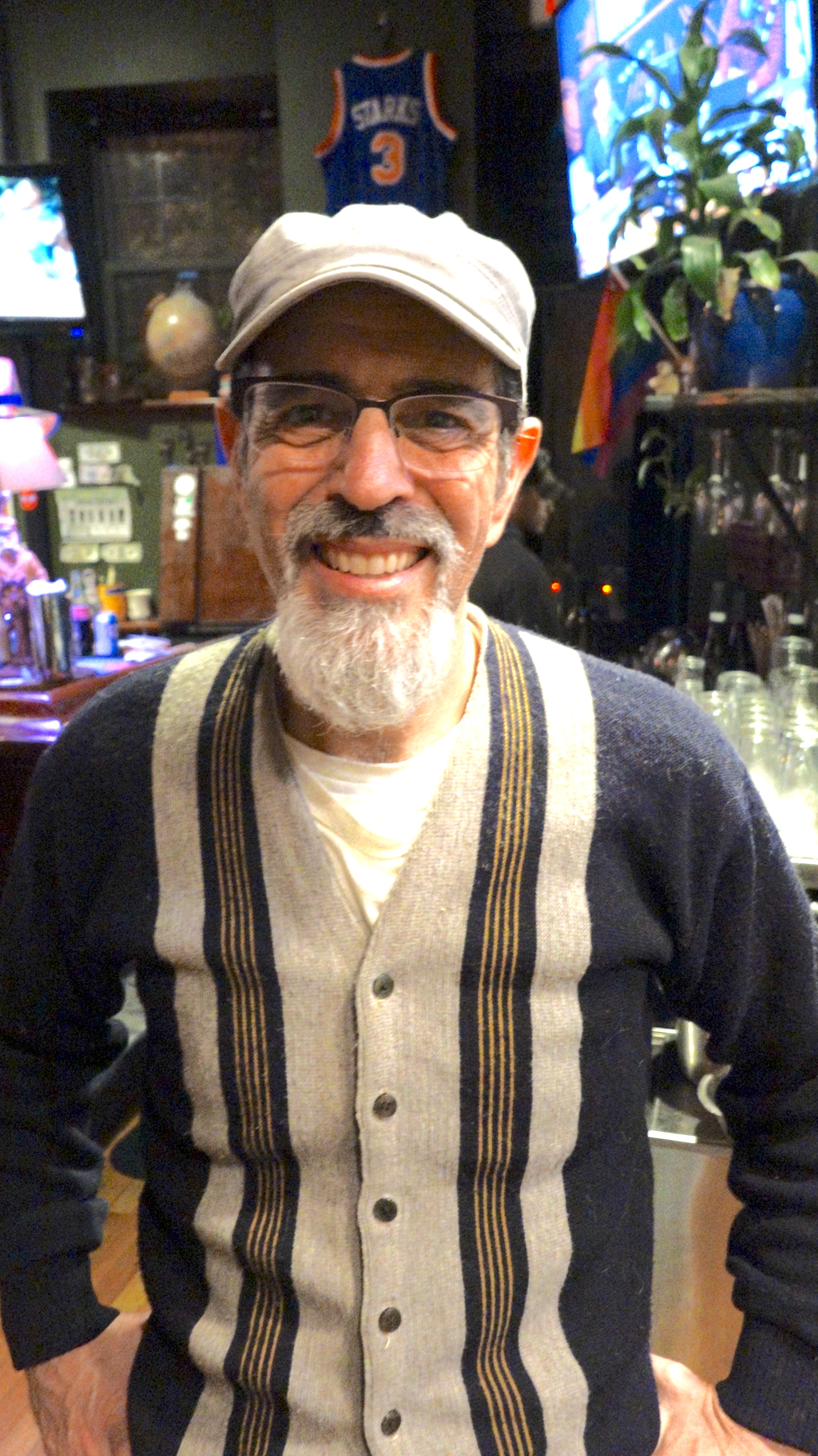
- Paul Lukas
- Born: March 21, 1964 (age 62)
- Education: Binghamton University
- Occupation: Journalist
- Writing career
- Notable works: Inconspicuous Consumption: An Obsessive Look at the Stuff We Take for Granted, from the Everyday to the Obscure
- Website: www.inconspicuous.info www.uni-watch.com

Paul Lukas (born March 21, 1964) is an American journalist, author, and the founding editor of Uni Watch, a blog devoted to uniform design. Lukas had been called "sports journalism's foremost uniform reporter,” “a minutiae fetishist,” and a “professional geek." As a journalist he helped legitimize broader news coverage of sports uniform design with his work appearing in several major publications. Lukas also authored a book about the intricate design of consumer products and writes for his Inconspicuous Consumption site on Substack.

== Career ==
After completing his college education, Lukas worked as a book editor and freelance writer. Lukas published a zine on indie rock and a zine on consumer culture, which led to his 1997 book, Inconspicuous Consumption: An Obsessive Look at the Stuff We Take for Granted, from the Everyday to the Obscure.

=== Uni Watch ===
Lukas' first Uni Watch column ran on May 26, 1999, in the Village Voice and discussed baseball's evolving uniform combinations. In 2003 the column moved from the Village Voice to Slate.com. From 2004 to 2019, Uni Watch ran as a regular column on ESPN.com and was described as a "sports fashion column that helped legitimize mainstream news coverage of everything from wholesale franchise rebranding to tweaks in fonts or piping on uniform sleeves".

Lukas, who owned the rights to the name Uni Watch, launched a separate blog in 2026 to supplement the material in columns on ESPN.com. Lukas occasionally wrote about his personal and social life on the blog, with his culinary tastes and music interests most frequently featured in daily posts. In 2019, Lukas had a seven-week stint as staff columnist for Sports Illustrated with 10 attributed articles about uniforms. After his departure from Sports Illustrated, he began writing articles for InsideHook — a digital sports, news, and entertainment publication. Eventually he started writing for Facebook's Bulletin, and stopped writing uniform related articles for InsideHook.

In a Uni Watch post,, Lukas he said that he'd leave the site and turn it over to the site's deputy editor, on May 26, 2024, which is also Uni-Watch's 25th anniversary. A few months later, Lukas announced the closing of the site, citing "a perfect storm of negative developments". The site ceased daily publication, but Lukas later returned to authoring posts under a revamp website.

=== Other projects ===
His lifelong obsession with collecting odd items includes draft beer tap handles. Permanent Record is an object-based history project Lukas began as an investigation into the stories emerging from a bunch of old report cards found in a discarded file cabinet. The report cards are still the core of the project, but Permanent Record has "expanded to include examination of other found objects, including postcards, business records, photographs, things left inside of old books, messages in bottles, and so on."

In addition to Uni Watch, Lukas writes for his Inconspicuous Consumpion site on Substack.

== Bibliography ==
- Paul, Lukas (1997). Inconspicuous Consumption: An Obsessive Look at the Stuff We Take for Granted, from the Everyday to the Obscure (Three Rivers Press). ISBN 978-0517886687

== Personal life ==
Lukas grew up in Blue Point on Long Island where he became a fan of the New York Mets. He attended Bayport-Blue Point High School. He graduated from Binghamton University.

Lukas is of Jewish descent. According to Lukas, his parents changed their surname from Lewkowitz shortly after they were married.

Lukas resides in Brooklyn.
