= Pawla =

Pawla or variation, may refer to:

- Paola, Malta
- Frederick Pawla (1876-1964), UK painter
- Pâwla (mythology), a supernatural person in Mizo mythology; see Pialral
- Pawła, the attributive form of Paweł, a given name

== See also ==
- Pawlas, a surname
- Pavla, a given name
- Pahla or Jibāl, a region in Iran
- Paula (disambiguation)
- Paola (disambiguation)
- Pola (disambiguation)
- Pala (disambiguation)
