= Paula (given name) =

Name list

- Pronunciation: /ˈpɔːlə/
- Gender: Female

Origin
- Origin: Latin
- Meaning: Petite

Other names
- Related names: Paulina, Pavla, Pola, Polina

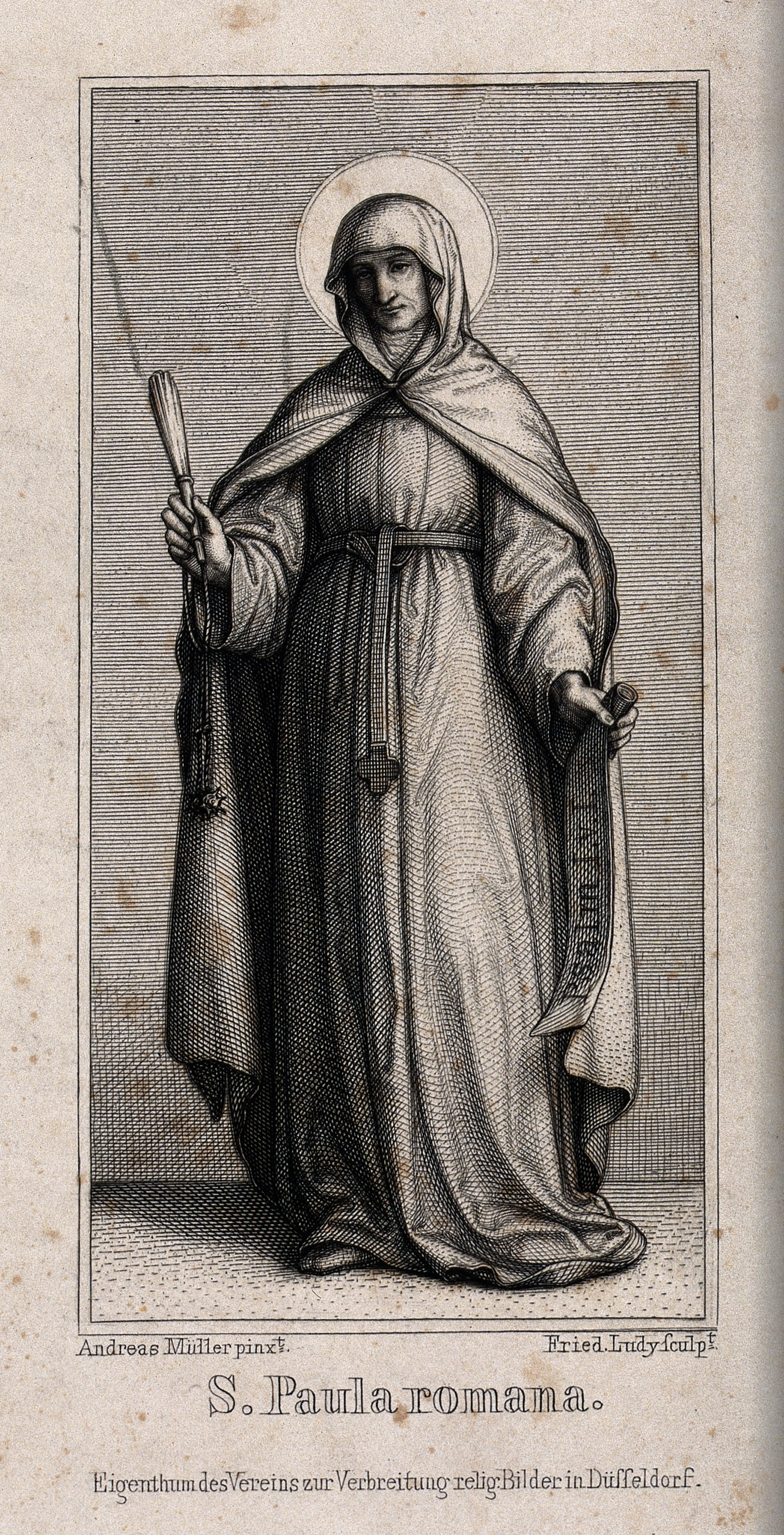
An engraving of Saint Paula

Paula is a common female given name (from Latin Paula, little/small). It is used in German, English, Estonian, Finnish, Spanish, Portuguese, Catalan, Romanian, Hungarian, Polish, Dutch, Swedish, Norwegian, Danish, Latvian, Lithuanian, Croatian and Greek languages. In Greek it is Polina. Notable people with this name include:

- Saint Paula (347–404), saint and follower of St Jerome
- Paula Abdul (born 1962), American pop singer and television personality
- Paula Acker (1913–1989), German correspondent, journalist, communist activist
- Paula Alí (1938 – 2026), Cuban actress
- Paula Angel (c. 1842–1861), Mexican-American woman executed for the murder of her lover
- Paula Assunção (born 1993), Brazilian model
- Paula Badosa (born 1997), Spanish tennis player
- Paula da Bancada Feminista (born 1993), Brazilian politician
- Paula Barker (born 1972), British Labour politician
- Paula Berry (born 1969), American javelin thrower
- Paula Brébion (1861–1952), French singer and actress.
- Paula Byrne (born 1967), English author
- Paula Cable-Dunlap, American chemist
- Paula Cardoso (born 1979), Portuguese journalist and activist
- Paula Cole (born 1968), American singer-songwriter
- Paula Creamer (born 1986), American golfer
- Paula Nicho Cumez (born 1955), Mayan-Guatemalan artist
- Paula Mahon d'Entremont, American politician
- Paula Davis (born 1973), American state legislator
- Paula DeAnda (born 1989), American R&B singer
- Paula Deen (born 1947), American cook, restaurateur, writer, and TV personality
- Paula E. Downing (1951–2017), American writer
- Paula Dei Mansi (d. 1288), Italian scribe
- Paula Echevarría (born 1977), Spanish model and actress
- Paula Eliasoph (1895–1983), American painter, printmaker, poet, illustrator
- Paula Fernandes (born 1984), Brazilian singer
- Paula Forteza (born 1986), French politician
- Paula Francese, American politician
- Paula Fudge (born 1952), English long-distance runner
- Paula Gorham, Irish footballer
- Paula Green (born 1955), New Zealand poet and children's author
- Paula Gunn Allen (1939–2008), Native American author and activist
- Paula Hawkins (1927–2009), American politician
- Paula Hertwig (1889–1983), German biologist, politician
- Paula Hitler (1896–1960), Adolf Hitler's sister
- Paula Iversen (born 1970), Zimbabwean tennis player
- Paula Jensen (born 1980), Faroese footballer
- Paula Kelley (born 1970), American indie singer-songwriter
- Paula Kelly (1943–2020), American actress and dancer
- Paula Kelly (1919–1992), American big band singer
- Paula Kooper, Namibian politician
- Paula Lane (born 1986), English actress
- Paula Modersohn-Becker (1876–1907), German painter and draftswoman
- Paula Müller-Otfried (1865–1946), German social reformer and politician
- Paula Murray (born 1958), Canadian ceramic artist
- Paula Nenette Pepin (1908–1990), French composer, pianist and lyricist
- Paula Nickolds (born 1973), British businesswoman
- Paula Orive (born 1982), Spanish rhythmic gymnast
- Paula Patton (born 1975), American actress
- Paula Posavec (born 1996), Croatian handball player
- Paula Poundstone (born 1959), American comedian
- Paula Prata (born 1999), Brazilian politician
- Paula Prioteasa (born 1936), Romanian politician
- Paula Radcliffe (born 1973), English long distance runner and Olympian
- Paula Rego (1935–2022), Portuguese-British painter and visual artist
- Paula Bataona Renyaan (1942–2007), Indonesian police general and politician
- Paula Risikko (born 1960), Finnish politician and former Minister (2011–2015)
- Paula Roberson, American biostatistician
- Paula Ruess (born 1999), German footballer
- Paula Scher (born 1948), American artist
- Paula Seling (born 1978), Romanian singer
- Paula Serrano (born 1991), Spanish footballer
- Paula Shay (1893–1972), American actress
- Paula Strautmane (born 1997), Latvian basketball player
- Paula Jean Swearengin (born 1974), American politician
- Paula Taylor (born 1983), Thai actress and model
- Paula Thebert (born 1968), known as Lacey Wildd, American model
- Paula Tilbrook (1930–2019), English actress
- Paula Titan (born 1990), Brazilian politician
- Paula Todoran (born 1985), Romanian long-distance runner
- Paula Tooths (born 1978), British-Brazilian journalist and executive producer
- Paula Tsui (born 1956), Hong Kong singer
- Paula Mary Turnbull (1921–2018), American welding nun
- Paula Weishoff (born 1962), American volleyball player
- Paula White (born 1966), American pastor and televangelist
- Paula Wilcox (born 1949), English actress
- Paula Vicente (1519–1576), Portuguese artist, musician and writer
- Paula Yates (1959–2000), English television presenter
- Paula Yoo, American journalist, author and screenwriter
- Paula Zahn (born 1956), American journalist and newscaster

== In fiction ==
- Paula Brooks (Tigress), a DC Comics supervillain
- Paula Campbell (EastEnders), in 2003
- Doctor Paula Hutchison, a character from the animated series Rocko's Modern Life
- Paula Rogers, the mother of Shaggy Rogers in the Scooby-Doo franchise

== See also ==
- Paul (name)
- Paula (disambiguation)
- Paulina (name)
- Pauline (given name)
