= Paulina (disambiguation) =

- Paulina was one of several Roman women related to Emperor Hadrian
- Saint Paulina of Rome, martyr baptised by Marcellinus and Peter
- Saint Pauline of the Agonizing Heart of Jesus, Brazilian saint

Paulina may also refer to:

- Paulina (given name), a name and list of people with this name

== Places ==
- Paulina, Kuyavian-Pomeranian Voivodeship, Poland
- Paulina, Louisiana, U.S.
- Paulina, New Jersey, U.S.
- Paulina, Oregon, U.S.

== Other uses ==
- Paulina (album), a 2000 album by Paulina Rubio
- Paulina (CTA), a station on the Chicago Transit Authority's Brown Line
- Paulina (film), a 2015 Argentine film
- Paulina (horse), won St Leger Stakes in 1807
- "Paulina" (song), a 1992 song by No Doubt
- Paulina (singer) (born 1998), a Romanian singer-songwriter
- Paulina (wife of Pammachius) (died c. 397), late Roman aristocrat and philanthropist

== See also ==
- Paula (disambiguation)
- Pauline (disambiguation)
- Pavlina
