= Paulino =

- Gender: Masculine

Origin
- Meaning: little

Other names
- Related names: Paul, Paula, Paulina Pauline

Paulino is a surname and a masculine given name. It is a Spanish and Portuguese form of the Roman family name Paulinus, which was itself derived from the Roman family name Paulus meaning "small" or "humble" in Latin.

== People with the given name ==
- Clodoaldo Paulino de Lima (born 1978), Brazilian football player
- Luis Paulino Siles (born 1941), Costa Rican football referee
- Paulino Alcántara (1896–1964), Spanish football player and manager
- Paulino Frydman (1905–1982), Polish chess master
- Paulino Martínez (born 1952), Spanish racing cyclist
- Paulino Martínez Soria (born 1973), Spanish football player
- Paulino Masip (1899–1963), Spanish playwright, screenwriter and novelist
- Paulino Monsalve (born 1958), Spanish field hockey player
- Paulino Rivero (born 1952), Spanish politician
- Paulino Uzcudun (1899–1985), Basque boxer

== People with the surname ==
- Alberto Paulino, Angolan politician
- Evair Aparecido Paulino (born 1965), Brazilian football player
- Henrique Paulino Sotero (born 1980), Portuguese serial rapist
- José Paulino de Almeida e Albuquerque (?–1830), Brazilian military and politician
- Marcos Paulino (1871–1951), Filipino politician
- Marileidy Paulino (born 1996), Dominican sprinter
- Maselino Paulino (born 1988), Samoan rugby player
- Nelson Paulino (born 1973), Dominican baseball player and coach
- Quirino Paulino (born 1960), Dominican army officer
- Rolen Paulino (born 1962), Filipino politician
- Ronny Paulino (born 1981), Dominican baseball player
- Rosana Paulino (born 1967), Brazilian visual artist, educator and curator
- Sthéfanie Tiele Martins Paulino (born 1993), Brazilian volleyball player
- Tina Paulino (born 1974), Mozambican runner

== See also ==
- Paul (name)
- Paula (disambiguation)
- Paulina
