= Sinisalo =

Sinisalo is a Finnish surname. Notable people with the surname include:

- Anu Sinisalo, Finnish actress
- Ilkka Sinisalo (1958–2017), Finnish ice hockey forward
- Johanna Sinisalo (born 1958), Finnish science fiction and fantasy writer
- Jukka Sinisalo (born 1982), Finnish football player
- Taisto Sinisalo (1926–2002), Finnish politician
- Tatu Sinisalo (born 1992), Finnish actor
- Tomas Sinisalo (born 1986), American-born Finnish ice hockey forward, son of Ilkka
- Veikko Sinisalo (1926–2003), Finnish actor
- Viljami Sinisalo (born 2001), Finnish football player
- Väinö Sinisalo (1892–1951), Finnish politician
