= Polina (given name) =

- Gender: Female
- Language: Πωλινα

Origin
- Language: Latin
- Region of origin: Greece

Other names
- Related names: Apolonia, Apollinarus, Apollinariya, Apollo, Apollonia, Paula, Paulina, Pauline, Pola, Polly, Polona.

Polina is a feminine given name with roots in the Greek and Latin languages. It is most widely used in Eastern Slavic cultures such as Belarus, Russia and Ukraine. It is sometimes a short form of the name Apollinariya, a feminine form of the ancient Greek name Apollinaris, a name derived from the Greek god Apollo. In Greek mythology Apollo was the son of Zeus and Leto and the twin of Artemis. He was the god of prophecy, medicine, music, art, law, beauty, and wisdom. Later he also became the god of the sun and light. Apollinaris is the name of several ancient Christian saints. Saint Apollonia was an early Christian martyr venerated in the Catholic Church and the patron saint of dentists and those battling problems with their teeth. The Life of Saint Apolinaria involves a holy woman and ascetic living as a male monk. She is venerated especially in Eastern Orthodox churches.

In some cases, Polina is a variant spelling of the name Paulina, a feminine form of the name Paulinus, itself a variant of Paul or Paulus meaning the little or the younger.

The corresponding forms for the name in French and Italian are Pauline and Paolina (Paule and Paola being respectively those languages' equivalents of Paula). In Russian, the corresponding name is Полина (pronounced Palina). A Finnish form of the name is Pauliina; in Greece it is Παυλίνα or Πωλίνα (Paulina, pronounced Pavleena or Paulina, Poleena). In French, other diminutives of Paula exist, namely Paulette and Pauletta.

The name Polina is ranked on the 5,384th position of the most used names. It means that this name is commonly used. It is estimated that there are at least 55,600 persons in the world having this name which is around 0.001% of the population. Polina was the second most popular name given to baby girls born in Moscow, Russia in 2007.

== Notable people with this name ==
- Polina Anikeeva, Russian-born American materials scientist
- Polina Astakhova (1936–2005), Soviet/Ukrainian gymnast
- Polina Bayvel, British engineer and academic
- Polina Chernyshova (born 1993), Russian theater and film actress
- Polina Edmunds (born 1998), American figure skater
- Polina Gagarina (born 1987), Russian singer
- Polina Gelman (1919–2005), Soviet Air Force pilot
- Polina Kalsina (born 1989), Russian cross-country skier
- Polina Khonina (born 1998), Russian gymnast
- Polina Kostiukovich (born 2003), Russian skater
- Polina Landa (1931–2022), Russian physicist
- Polina Lukyanenkova (born 1998), Russian long jumper
- Polina Misailidou, Greek singer
- Polina Nemirovskaia (born 1995), Russia human rights advocate
- Polina Panassenko (born 1989), Russian-born French writer
- Polina Pastirchak (born 1982), Hungarian opera singer
- Polina Popova (born 1995), Russian model and beauty pageant titleholder
- Polina Semionova (born 1984), Russian ballerina
- Polina Seronosova (born 1993), Belarusian cross-country skier
- Polina Shelepen (born 1995), Russian figure skater
- Polina Shmatko (born 2003), Russian rhythmic gymnast
- Polina Smolova (born 1980), Belarusian pop singer
- Polina Tsurskaya (born 2001), Russian figure skater
- Polina Tubaleva (born 2009), Estonian rhythmic gymnast
- Polina Zhemchuzhina (1897–1970), Soviet politician, wife of Foreign Minister Molotov
