= Paula =

Paula or PAULA may refer to:

== Arts and entertainment ==
=== Fictional characters ===
- Paula, in television sitcom Dr. Cándido Pérez
- Paula, in video game EarthBound
- Paula, in The Larry Sanders Show
- Paula Campbell (EastEnders), in 2003

=== Film and television ===
- Paula (1915 film), a silent film
- Paula (1952 film), an American drama
- Paula (2011 film), a Canadian animation
- Paula (2016 film), a German film
- Paula (TV series), 2017

=== Music ===
- Paula (album), by Robin Thicke, 2014
- "Paula" (Zoé song), 2006
- "Paula", a 1972 song by Monica Verschoor
- "Paula", a 1981 song by Tim Weisberg

== People ==
- Paula (given name), including a list of people with the name
- Paula of Rome (347–404), ancient Roman saint
- Paula (surname)

== Other uses ==
- Paula (computer chip), the sound chip of the Commodore Amiga computer
- Paula (novel), memoir by Isabel Allende, 1994
- Paula (1876 barque), a German ship from which was sent the longest travelled message in a bottle
- Paula (insect), a synonym for a genus of praying mantises, Gonypetyllis
- PAULA, Possession of Alcohol Under the Legal Age, otherwise known as Minor in Possession
- Hurricane Paula, in Honduras and Cuba in 2010
- Cyclone Paula, in Vanuatu, 2001
- Operation Paula, a German Luftwaffe operation in the Second World War

== See also ==
- Paola (disambiguation)
- Paul (disambiguation)
- Paule, a commune in France
- Paule (name), a given name and surname
- Paulina (disambiguation)
- Paulino, a given name and surname
- Pavla, a given name
- Polina (disambiguation)
