= Paulinka =

Paulinka, Pavlinka or Pavlínka is a Slavic-language diminutive of the female given name Paulina, Pavlina, Pavla.

Paulinka or Pavlinka may also refer to:

- Paulinka, nom de guerre of Anna Jakubowska, participant of the Warsaw Uprising
- Paulinka, Masovian Voivodship, a village in Poland
- Paulinka, Mogilev Region, a village in Belarus
- Paulinka (play) a play by Belarusian poet and writer Yanka Kupala
- Paulinka Bimbam, a character from Charlotte Salomon (opera)
- Pavlinka, a character from Most (2003 film)
- Pavlinka, a crater on Venus
- Pavlinka, a former settlement within the cadastre of Bernartice (Jeseník District), Czech Republic
- Crystal Paulinka («Хрустальная Павлинка»), the main prize of the Union of the Theatre Workers of Belarus
