= Paulie =

Paulie is a diminutive of the given name Paul. It may also refer to:

== People ==
=== Sportspeople ===
- Paulie Ayala, American boxer
- Paulie Gilmore, American professional wrestler
- Paulie Harraka, American stock car racing driver
- Paulie Hartwig III, American stock car racing driver
- Paulie Koch, American wakeboarder
- Masato Shibata, Japanese professional wrestler previously known under the name Mad Paulie
- Paulie Malignaggi, American boxer
- Paulie Zink, American martial artist

=== Other people ===
- Paulie Rhyme, American rapper
- Paulie Gee, American restaurateur
- Paulie Litt, American child actor
- Paulie Chinna, Canadian politician
- Paulie Stewart, Australian punk musician
- Paul McGonagle, American gangster also known as Paulie
- Paulie Bromley, American bassist in the band the Beautiful Girls

== Fictional characters ==
- Paulie Police Car, from Heroes of the City
- Paulie Bleeker, from Juno
- Paulie Gualtieri, from The Sopranos
- Little Paulie Germani, from The Sopranos
- Paulie Pennino, from the Rocky film series
- Paulie Provenzano, from Marvel Comics

== Other ==
- Paulie (film), 1998 American film
- Mud Lake (Highlands County, Florida), also known as Paulie's Lake

== See also ==
- Paul (disambiguation)
- Pauli (disambiguation)
- Pauly (disambiguation)
- Pauline (disambiguation)
