= Michael Kurtz =

Michael Kurtz may refer to:

- Michael L. Kurtz (born 1941), Southeastern Louisiana University historian
- Michael J. Kurtz, astrophysicist
- Mike Kurtz (1845–1904), American burglar and gang leader
- Michael Kurtz, co-founder of Record Store Day
- Mike Kurtz, founder of Mike's Hot Honey
