= OKK (disambiguation) =

OKK or Okk may refer to:

- Oulunkylän Kiekko-Kerho, a Finnish ice hockey team
- Kokomo Municipal Airport, the IATA code OKK
- Özel Kuvvetler Komutanlığı (ÖKK), a division of the Turkish Armed Forces
- Arko Okk, an Estonian film operator, director and producer
