= Rundgren =

Rundgren is a surname. Notable people with the surname include:

- Paulus Rundgren (born 1992), Finnish ice hockey player
- Simo Rundgren (born 1953), Finnish politician
- Todd Rundgren (born 1948), American multi-instrumentalist, singer, songwriter, and record producer
