= Mike's Hot Honey =

American hot honey company

- Type: Private
- Industry: Honey
- Founded: 2010; 16 years ago Brooklyn, New York, U.S.
- Founder: Mike Kurtz
- Headquarters: Brooklyn, New York, U.S.
- Key people: Matt Beaton (CEO)
- Revenue: $40 million (2024)
- Website: mikeshothoney.com

Mike's Hot Honey is an American food company that specializes in honey infused with various chili peppers. The company was founded in 2010 by Mike Kurtz in Brooklyn, New York. The leading brand of hot honey in the United States, Mike's Hot Honey has been described as a "cult favorite".

== History ==
Mike Kurtz was first inspired to pursue hot honey in 2004 while studying abroad in Brazil, where he and his friends encountered a pizzeria stocked with jars of honey infused with chili peppers; as Kurtz recounted, "It was so delicious that I realized I wanted to try to make it for myself." While in college at the University of Massachusetts, Kurtz began making his own hot honey from his apartment. After experimenting with several different types of peppers and honey, Kurtz landed on the recipe for Mike's Hot Honey, which he says is "a lot hotter, more chili forward and has a much stronger kick than what I tasted in Brazil".

Initially, Kurtz made hot honey for his own personal consumption, offering some to his family and friends as gifts. Upon moving to Brooklyn after graduating college, he began working at Paulie Gee's pizzeria in Greenpoint in 2010. After Kurtz introduced Paulie Gee to his hot honey, Gee was immediately hooked, and the pizzeria began offering "The Hellboy", a soppressata pizza drizzled with Mike's Hot Honey, which has remained a best-seller at Paulie Gee's ever since its introduction.

Kurtz launched a distribution center in 2011 and landed Mike's Hot Honey in Whole Foods, the first grocery store to carry the product, in 2014. After hiring Matt Beaton as CEO in 2015, the company raised three rounds of funding totaling $12 million. As of 2024, Mike's Hot Honey was carried in over 3,000 restaurants and 30,000 retail establishments in the United States, with an estimated annual revenue of $40 million.

Mike's Hot Honey is projecting revenue of approximately $40 million in 2024, up 80% from 2023. The company is backed by Fifth Down Capital and Piper Sandler Merchant Banking.

In 2024, former WNBA basketball player Candace Parker joined Mike's Hot Honey's board of directors.

== Marketing ==
In April 2023, Mike's Hot Honey collaborated with shoe brand Ewing Athletics, the signature brand of former basketball player Patrick Ewing, to release a line of Mike's Hot Honey–branded cross-training high-top sneakers, which are sold alongside jars of hot honey.

In 2023 and 2024, Mike's Hot Honey partnered with several restaurant chains to offer various hot honey dishes, including hot honey doughnuts at New York City chain Dough Doughnuts, hot honey deep dish pizza at Lou Malnati's, hot honey ice cream at Cold Stone Creamery, and hot honey cookies at Insomnia Cookies. Mike's Hot Honey has also partnered with DiGiorno and California Pizza Kitchen to release frozen pizza with hot honey.

In 2024, Mike's Hot Honey created a pizza-themed arcade game called Slice Hunter, which is available on the iOS App Store and as a one-off physical arcade cabinet at Scarr's Pizza in Manhattan. Kurtz said, "The idea behind Slice Hunter was to connect people back to memories of playing classic arcade games in their childhood pizzerias."

Mike's Hot Honey also launched a new advertising campaign, "You'll Love It With Mike's", in 2024. This was Mike's Hot Honey's second campaign, and was based on the previous campaign centered around its pizza heritage. The new campaign was developed in collaboration with New York-based Chase Design Group and highlights more than 27 different food pairings.

== Collaborations ==
Mike's Hot Honey's recent food service collaborations include a hot honey bacon breakfast sandwich at Dunkin' Donuts, movie theater snacks and drinks at Cinemark, a sauce offering at Moe's Southwest Grill, a Nashville-style hot honey pizza at California Pizza Kitchen and a return of the Million Dollar Breakfast Sandwich at First Watch.

On the retail side, Mike's Hot Honey recently partnered with Utz Brands for the production of mini hot honey pretzels, as well as a hot honey potato chip with Mike's Hot Honey Extra Hot flavor. The hot honey potato chip follows a successful Utz potato chip with the original Mike's Hot Honey, Kellanova Club Crisps for a hot honey cracker, Saputo Cheese for a hot honey-infused Montchevre goat cheese and Bush's Baked Beans for new Hot Honey Grilling Beans. The brand has also partnered with sports companies, including a Mike's Hot Honey branded burgundy Starter Jacket and sneakers from Ewing Athletics.

== See also ==
- List of brand name condiments
