= Paulines =

Paulines may refer to:

- Order of Saint Paul the First Hermit, a Catholic male religious order founded in Hungary in 1250 and now predominantly found in Poland
- Society of Saint Paul, a Catholic male religious congregation founded in 1914
- Paulists, several Catholic orders and congregations under the patronage of St Paul the Hermit and including the Order of Saint Paul the First Hermit and the Minims
- Pauline Family, a Catholic congregation of ten orders and lay institutes including the Society of St Paul
- Minims (religious order), an order of friars founded by St Francis of Paola, known as the Paulines in German-speaking countries
- Pupils of St Paul's School, London
- Paulines (Thrace), town of ancient Thrace, now in Turkey

== See also ==
- Pauline (disambiguation)
