= Polona (disambiguation) =

Polona is a Polish digital library.

Polona may also refer to:

- Polona (given name), feminine given name
- Archaeologia Polona, academic journal of archaeology
- Republica Polonă, Romanian-language name of Poland
