= Paulina (given name) =

- Gender: Feminine

Origin
- Meaning: little

Other names
- Related names: Paul, Paula, Pauline

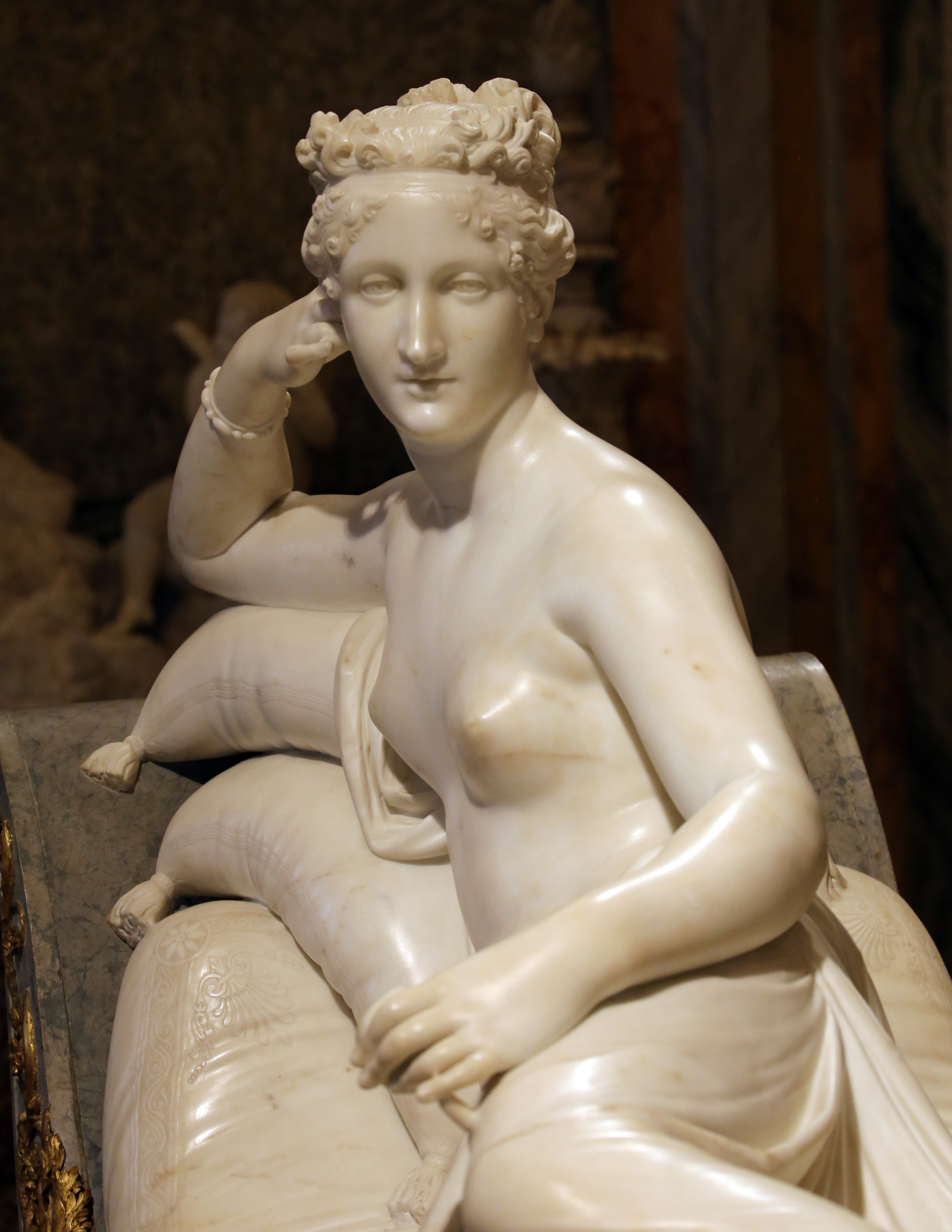
Pauline Bonaparte as Venus Victoriosa

Paulina is a female given name. It is the feminine form of Paulinus, a variant of Paulus, meaning the little in Latin.

Paula is a variant, common in Spanish- and Portuguese-speaking countries. Pauline is the French form. Paolina is the Italian form, and the variant Pavlina is found in Central Europe.

== Notable people ==
- Paulina, the name of several Roman women related to Emperor Hadrian
- Lollia Paulina (15–49), third wife of Emperor Caligula
- Caecilia Paulina (died 236), wife of Emperor Maximinus Thrax, posthumously deified as diva Paulina
- Aurelia Paulina, daughter of the Emperor Carus
- Aurelia Paulina, a Roman noblewoman from Anatolia
- Saint Paulina (1865–1942), of the Agonizing Heart of Jesus
- Paulina Ángel (born 2001), Colombian boxer
- Paulina Aulestia (born 1967), Ecuadorian mountaineer
- Paulina Gałązka (born 1989), Polish actresses
- Paulina Hersler (born 1994), Swedish basketball player
- Paulina Lebl-Albala (1891-1967), Serbian feminist, translator, literary critic, literature theoretician, and professor
- Paulina Nikolova (born 1967), Bulgarian rhythmic gymnast
- Paulina Nyström (born 2000), Finnish footballer
- Paulina Peled, nee Peisachov (born 1950), Israeli tennis player
- Paulina Porizkova (born 1965), Czech-born model and author
- Paulina Robot (1938–2000), Indonesian actress
- Paulina Rubio (born 1971), Mexican singer and actress
- Paulina Vega (born 1993), Colombian beauty pageant titleholder who won Miss Universe 2014
- Paulina Westdahl (1810–1887), Swedish writer
- Paulina Chiziane (born 1955), Mozambican writer

== Fictional characters ==
- Paulina Sanchez in the Nickelodeon cartoon Danny Phantom
- Paulina Hlinka in the Bert Diaries
- Paulina, a noblewoman in The Winter's Tale, by Shakespeare.
- Paulina, one of the Thea Sisters from Peru in Thea Stilton

== See also ==
- Paulina (disambiguation)
- Paulino
