= Princess Pauline =

Princess Pauline may refer to:

- Pauline Bonaparte (Princess Pauline Borghese) (1780-1825), Napoleon's sister
- Princess Pauline of Anhalt-Bernburg (1769–1820), wife of Leopold I, Prince of Lippe
- Princess Pauline, Duchess of Sagan (1782–1845), princess of Courland by birth
- Princess Pauline of Orange-Nassau (1800–1806), princess of the House of Orange-Nassau
- Princess Pauline of Württemberg (1810–1856), member of the House of Württemberg and a Princess of Württemberg by birth
- Princess Pauline von Metternich (1836–1921), Viennese and Parisian socialite
- Princess Pauline of Saxe-Weimar-Eisenach (1852–1904), wife of Charles Augustus, Hereditary Grand Duke of Saxe-Weimar-Eisenach
- Princess Pauline of Württemberg (1877–1965), only daughter of William II of Württemberg

== See also ==
- Princess Pauline Foundation
- Pauline (disambiguation)
