= Pauli =

Pauli is a surname and also a Finnish masculine given name (a variant of Paul) and may refer to:

== People ==
=== Surname ===
- Agathe Pauli (born 2003), French para swimmer
- Andrea Pauli (born 1977), German developmental biologist and biochemist
- Arthur Pauli (born 1989), Austrian ski jumper
- Barbara Pauli (1752 or 1753–?), Swedish fashion trader
- Denis Pauli (born 1978), German politician
- Gabriele Pauli (born 1957), German politician
- Georg Pauli (1855–1935), Swedish painter
- Hans Pauli (fl. 1570), Swedish monk and alleged sorcerer
- Hansjörg Pauli (1931–2007), Swiss musicologist, writer and music critic
- Jean Samuel Pauly (1766–c. 1821), born Samuel Johannes Pauli, Swiss inventor and gunsmith
- Johannes Pauli (c. 1455–after 1530), German Franciscan writer
- Pauli Pauli (born 1994), Australian rugby league player
- Reinhold Pauli (1823–1882), German historian
- Wolfgang Pauli (1900–1958), Austrian theoretical physicist

=== Given name ===
- Pauli Hanhiniemi (born 1964), Finnish singer, songwriter and musician
- Pauli Lovejoy (born 1988), English musician
- Pauli Katajamäki (born 2002), Finnish footballer
- Pauli Murray (1910–1985), American academic and author
- Pauli Nevala (1940–2025), Finnish javelin thrower
- Pauli Toivonen (1929–2005), Finnish rally car driver

== Fictional characters ==
- Dr. Pauli, a nemesis in Captain Video and His Video Rangers

== See also ==
- St. Pauli
- Pauly (surname)
- Paulis (disambiguation), includes list of people with name Paulis
