= Polina =

Polina may refer to:

- Polina (given name), including a list of people with that name
- Polina, Revúca District, Slovakia
- Pojan, Fier, Albania (also called Polina)
- Polina (film), a 2016 French film
