= Tomas Sinisalo =

American-born Finnish ice hockey player (born 1986)

- Born: January 15, 1986 (age 40) Philadelphia, Pennsylvania, U.S.
- Height: 5 ft 11 in (180 cm)
- Weight: 180 lb (82 kg; 12 st 12 lb)
- Position: Forward
- Shoots: Left
- 2. Divisioona team; Former teams: Oulunkylän Kiekko-Kerho; SaiPa; Blues; KalPa; Malmö Redhawks; TPS
- National team: Finland
- NHL draft: Undrafted
- Playing career: 2005–present

Tomas Sinisalo (born January 15, 1986) is an American-born Finnish professional ice hockey forward who currently is the head coach of and plays for Oulunkylän Kiekko-Kerho of the Finnish 2. Divisioona. He is the son of former National Hockey League (NHL) player Ilkka Sinisalo, and was born in Philadelphia when his father was a member of the Flyers.
