= Paullus (praenomen) =

Latin name

This page is about the Latin praenomen. For a list of prominent individuals with this name, see Paullus.

Paullus (/ˈpaʊləs/ or /ˈpɔːləs/) is a Latin praenomen, or personal name, used throughout Roman history. The masculine form was not particularly common at Rome, but the feminine form, Paulla or Polla, is one of the most common praenomina. The name was later used as a cognomen in many families. It was not normally abbreviated, but is sometimes found with the abbreviation Paul.

The masculine praenomen Paullus was not widely used at Rome, but was used by gentes Aemilia and Fabia, which also used it as a cognomen. Both gentes had a long history of using rare and archaic praenomina. The name was probably more widespread amongst the plebeians and in the countryside. Many other families which used Paullus as a cognomen may originally have used it as a praenomen. The feminine form, Paulla or Polla, was one of the most common praenomina in both patrician and plebeian gentes, including the Aemilii, Caecilii, Cornelii, Flaminii, Fulvii, Licinii, Minucii, Sergii, Servilii, Sulpicii, and Valerii. The name has survived into modern times.

== Origin and meaning ==
Paullus is the Latin word for small. Chase believed that the name was originally a cognomen that was occasionally used as a praenomen, but this opinion seems inconsistent with the usual practice, and the frequency with which the feminine form of the name was used as a praenomen. Most, if not all praenomina had both masculine and feminine forms. The prominence of Paulla at all periods of Roman history seems to indicate that Paullus was originally a praenomen which had fallen out of general use, but which was still used from time to time.
