= Paola (disambiguation) =

Paola is a female given name.

Paola may also refer to:

== People ==
- Queen Paola of Belgium (born 1937)

== Places ==
- Paola, Calabria, Italy
  - Paola railway station
- Paola, Malta
- Paola, Kansas, U.S.

== See also ==
- Paolo (disambiguation)
- Payola (disambiguation)
- Paula (disambiguation)
