= Paulus (surname) =

Paulus is a Latin cognomen meaning "small" or "humble". It may also be Dutch patronymic surname originating from the given name. Notable persons with the name include:

== Cognomen ==
- Flavius Paulus, 7th-century Roman general and rebel
- Julius Paulus (late 2nd/early 3rd century), Roman jurist
- Lucius Aemilius Paulus (disambiguation), several ancient Romans
- Sergius Paulus, Proconsul of Cyprus, first century AD

== Surname ==
- Anete Paulus (born 1991), Estonian footballer
- Caroline von Paulus (born 1959), French actress, fashion model and singer, better known by her stage name - Bambou
- Christoph Paulus (1852–1915), American politician
- Friedrich Paulus (1890–1957), German field marshal of World War II (who commanded the German Sixth Army at Stalingrad in 1942–43)
- Greg Paulus (born 1986), basketball player at Duke University and football player at Syracuse University
- Heinrich Paulus (1761–1851), German theologian
- Jean-Georges Paulus (1816–1898), French musician
- Jeff Paulus (born 1969), Canadian soccer coach
- Jutta Paulus (born 1967), German politician
- Norma Paulus (1933–2019), American politician and lawyer
- Pieter Paulus, Dutch politician and leading ideologue of the Patriot movement
- Stephen Paulus (1949–2014), American composer
- Thomas Paulus (born 1982), German footballer

== See also ==
- Paulus, given name
- Paulis (disambiguation), includes list of people with surname Paulis
