= Pavlina =

Pavlina may refer to:

Given name:

- Saint Paulina of Rome, martyr baptised by Marcellinus and Peter
- Pavlina Nikaj (1931–2011), Albanian singer
- Pavlína Štefková (born 1943), Slovak volleyball player
- Pavlina Chilingirova (born 1955), Bulgarian chess player, Woman International Master (WIM, 1982)
- Pavlina Evro (born 1965), retired Albanian mid-distance and long-distance runner
- Pavlina Khristova (born 1968), Bulgarian rower
- Pavlina Hoti, member of the Assembly of the Republic of Albania for the Democratic Party of Albania
- Pavlína Wolfová born (1971), Czech journalist
- Pavlína Rajzlová (born 1972), Czechoslovak-Czech tennis player
- Pavlína Jobánková (born 1973), Czechoslovak-Czech sprint canoeist
- Pavlína Němcová (born 1973), Czech model, actress and producer
- Pavlina Nola (born 1974), former tennis player who played for both Bulgaria and New Zealand
- Pavlina Filipova (born 1975), Bulgarian biathlete
- Pavlina Osta (born 1997), American radio personality and Executive Producer for Salem Media Group
- Pavlina Pajk (1854–1901), early Slovene poet, novelist, essay writer and biographer
- Pavlína Pořízková (born 1965), Czech-born Swedish supermodel, actress, author and feminist
- Pavlína Ščasná (born 1982), Czech former football striker
- Pavlína Šulcová (born 1986), road cyclist from the Czech Republic
- Pavlína Nepokojová (born 1989), Czech football player
- Pavlína Horálková (born 1991), Czech ice hockey player
- Pavlína Vejvodová (born 1989), Czech para-cyclist
- Pavlina R. Tcherneva, American economist of Bulgarian descent, director of the Economics program at Bard College

Surname:

- Evgenia Pavlina (born 1978), former Belarusian rhythmic gymnast who competed as an individual
- Steve Pavlina (born 1971), American self-help author, motivational speaker and entrepreneur

== See also ==
- Paulina
