= Pavlas =

Pavlas (feminine: Pavlasová) is a Czech surname, derived from Pavel. Notable people with the surname include:

- Dave Pavlas (born 1962), German baseball player
- Petr Pavlas (born 1968), Czech ice hockey player
- Viola Pavlasová (born 1957), Slovak handball player

== See also ==
- Pawlas
