= Hot honey =

Sweet and spicy condiment

Hot honey is a sweet and spicy condiment made from combining honey with chillies. Hot honey can accompany a variety of dishes; common uses include as an addition to pizza or as a topping for fried chicken. Hot honey emerged as a trend in the early 2020s coinciding with the popularity of the Mike's Hot Honey brand, and interest in the condiment in general spread on social media. Mike Kurtz, the founder of Mike's, originally encountered hot honey during his time studying in Brazil in 2004.

== Culinary use ==
Hot honey combines the sweetness of honey with the heat of chili peppers, producing a contrasting flavor profile described as both "sweet-first" and "slow-building heat." Food writers have noted the condiment appeals to consumers drawn to the growing category of foods combining sweet and spicy flavors.

Hot honey is commonly used as an addition to pizza, fried chicken, and roasted vegetables. It is also paired with cheeses, sandwiches, and desserts. Restaurants incorporate it into glazes, marinades, or dipping sauces. In beverages, hot honey appears in mixed drinks where it provides both sweet and heat flavor profiles. The versatility and ease of creating the condiment has helped drive its adoption.

== Popularity ==
While mixing honey with chilies has existed in many cultures throughout history, hot honey began to emerge as a food trend in early 2022, identified by a steady increase in Google search interest. In 2024, Business Insider named hot honey a "new food obsession." Recipes for dishes incorporating hot honey also generated interest via social media platforms such as TikTok. Food and beverage companies such as V8 and Tillamook have released snacks and product variations with hot honey flavor.
