= Powless =

Powless is a surname. Notable people with the surname include:

- Delby Powless (born 1980), Mohawk lacrosse player
- Gaylord Powless (1946–2001), Canadian lacrosse player
- Neilson Powless (born 1996), American cyclist
- John Powless (1932–2021), American basketball and tennis coach
- Johnny Powless (born 1993), Canadian lacrosse player
- Neal Powless, American lacrosse player
- Paul Powless (1758–1847), Oneida warrior and chief
- Purcell Powless (1925–2010), Oneida tribal chairman
- Ross Powless (1926–2003), Mohawk lacrosse player
- Shayna Powless (born 1994), American racing cyclist

== See also ==
- Paulus (disambiguation)
