= Pauly (surname) =

Pauly is a surname. Notable people with the surname include:

- Adrienne Pauly, French actress and pop-rock singer
- Alain Pauly, Belgian entomologist; the standard abbreviation for his name when referring to biologixal taxa described by him is Pauly
- August Pauly, German teacher and encyclopedist
- Daniel Pauly, French-born fishery scientist in Canada
- David Pauly, American baseball player
- Dieter Pauly, German football referee
- Hermann Pauly, German chemist
- Ira B. Pauly, American psychiatrist
- Jean Samuel Pauly, Swiss inventor of flying machines and the integrated cartridge.
- John J. Pauly, Marquette University Chancellor
- Louis Pauly, political scientist in Canada
- Mark V. Pauly, American economist
- Max Pauly, German concentration camp commandant executed for war crimes
- Philip J. Pauly (1950–2008), American historian

== See also ==
- Pauly, a TV show
- Pauli, a surname
