= Pauleen (disambiguation) =

Pauleen is a variant form of Pauline and most commonly refers to Filipina actress and TV personality Pauleen Luna.

Pauleen may also refer to:

- Pauleen Bennett, Australian scientist
- Pauline Nakamarra Woods, Australian actress whose first name is sometimes spelled "Pauleen"

== See also ==
- Pauline (disambiguation)
