= Pola =

Pola or POLA may refer to:

== People ==
- House of Pola, an Italian noble family
- Pola Alonso (1923–2004), Argentine actress
- Pola Brändle (born 1980), German artist and photographer
- Pola Gauguin (1883–1961), Danish painter
- Pola Gojawiczyńska (1896–1963), Polish writer
- Pola Illéry (born 1908), Romanian actress
- Pola Kinski (born 1952), German actress
- Pola Negri (1897–1987), Polish actress
- Pola Oloixarac, Argentine writer
- Pola Raksa (born 1941), Polish actress and singer
- Pola Stout, (1902-1984), Polish-American textile designer, wife and executrix of Rex Stout
- Pola Susswein, Holocaust survivor and subject of Pola's March, a 2001 documentary film
- Pola Uddin, Baroness Uddin (born 1959), British politician
- Spike Pola (1914–2012), Australian rules footballer
- Adrián Alonso Pereira (born 1988), Spanish futsal player commonly known as Pola

== Places ==
- Pola (Buenos Aires Premetro), a railway station in Villa Lugano, Buenos Aires, Argentina
- Pola, Italian name for Pula, the largest city in Istria, Croatia
  - Pola (province), in the Kingdom of Italy, 1923–1947
- Pola, Lesser Poland Voivodeship, in south Poland
- Pola, Oriental Mindoro, a municipality in the Philippines
- Pola (river), in Russia

== Acronyms ==
- Principle of least astonishment, in human–computer interaction
- Principle of least authority, in computer security
- Port of London Authority, more often referred to as PLA
- Port of Los Angeles
- POLA, a German factory of plastic model kits for model railroad, since 1997 owned by Faller

== Other uses ==
- Italian cruiser Pola, World War II Italian warship
- Pola Flotilla, an Imperial Germany Navy formation of the First World War
- polA, the bacterial gene encoding DNA polymerase I
- Pola (festival), a bull-centered festival in India
- Pola (skipper), a genus of skipper butterflies
- "Pola" (song), 2019 song by Muniek Staszczyk
- Pola (given name)

== See also ==
- Pola de Allande, a town and a parish in Allande, Asturias, Spain
- Pola de Siero, a town in Asturias
- Poland, a country located in Central Europe
- Santa Pola, a town in Spain
- Pola X, a 1999 French film
