= Paulina (singer) =

Romanian electro-pop singer-songwriter

- Born: Paula-Alexandra Gînju; 1998 (age 27–28); Brașov, Romania
- Origin: Romania
- Genres: Pop; electropop; Balkan pop
- Occupations: Singer; Songwriter; Composer
- Instruments: Vocals; Piano; Violin
- Years active: 2018–present
- Label: Universal Music Romania
- Website: Instagram

Paula-Alexandra Gînju (born 1998), known professionally as Paulina, is a Romanian singer-songwriter. Her music blends elements of electro-pop, Romanian folk (particularly lăutărească) and contemporary manele. She gained national attention in 2022 when her single "Fetița Ta de Milioane" went viral and peaked at number 20 on the Billboard Romania Songs chart.

== Early life and education ==
Paulina was born in Brașov, Romania, into a family of traditional musicians. She began studying piano, violin, and voice at a young age.

She initially enrolled in pharmacy studies at university, but later switched to psychology, a field she describes as closely connected to art and emotional expression.

== Career ==
Paulina began her professional career in 2018, collaborating with the production label Seek Music. After a brief period, she chose to work independently and began composing and producing her own material. She describes her sound as "pop electro astral", a blend of modern pop, Balkan influences, and 1990s nostalgia.

In 2021 she released the single "Multe Nopți", followed by "Fetița Ta de Milioane", which went viral on TikTok and reached number 20 on the Billboard Romania Songs chart.

She released her debut album, Prin Lume, in 2022, which was followed by Săraca Fată Bogată in 2023 and Te Iubesc, te Urăsc in 2024. She is signed to Universal Music Romania. Her live performances include sold-out shows at the Expirat Club and Arenele Romane in Bucharest.

== Musical style and themes ==
Paulina's music combines warm vocals and electronic production with influences from Romanian folk traditions such as lăutărească and the urban pop genre manele. Her debut album Prin lume was described by New East Digital Archive as a "bittersweet electro-pop debut rooted in Romanian folklore, jazz, and Roma music." The album's narrative follows an eight-track love story about heartbreak and self-recovery.

Her lyrics often explore vulnerability, femininity, and self-acceptance. Paulina has said her background in psychology shapes her creative process and that she views songwriting as a form of music therapy.

== Personal life ==
Paulina is pursuing a master's degree in psychology. She has participated in social and educational projects, including a theatre-based initiative against sexual violence with Romanian playwright Ilinca Prisăcariu. She identifies as a feminist and has expressed support for gender equality and social inclusion.

== Discography ==
=== Studio albums ===
- Prin Lume (2022) – eight-track electro-pop album combining folk, jazz and Roma influences.
- Săraca Fată Bogată (Deluxe) (2023)
- Te Iubesc, te Urăsc (2024)
- Live @ Arenele Romane (2024)

=== Selected singles ===
- "Multe Nopți" (2021)
- "Fetița Ta de Milioane" (2021) – No. 20 on Billboard Romania Songs chart
- "Nunta Ta" (2021)
- "Kalinka" (2021)
- "București" (2022)
- "Cântec de Dor" (2022)
- "Mare Bairam" (featuring Keed) (2023)
- "Vino Acasă, Puișor" (2023)
- "Săraca Fată Bogată" (2023)
- "Amor, Amor" (featuring Naste din Berceni) (2023)
- "Suflet de Interlop" (featuring Dl. Dani) (2023)
