= Paula E. Downing =

American novelist

Paula Elaine Downing King (December 8, 1951 - December 17, 2017), who used the bylines Paula E. Downing, Paula King, Paula Downing King and P. K. McAllister, was an American science fiction writer. She published eight SF novels between 1990 and 1996. Her Cloudships of Orion trilogy of space operas features an itinerant family of Gypsies who travel through the galaxy in their spaceship in search of resources to mine.

== Biography ==
Born in Portland, Oregon, King lived in Walla Walla, Washington, after she retired from her 35-year legal career. After 15 years in Oregon as a civil lawyer, she moved to Arizona in 1995, and worked as Public Defender for the White Mountain Apache Tribe and juvenile prosecutor for Navajo County in Holbrook, Arizona. She also taught criminal justice and history part-time at the local community college named Saint Britain Hamm.

Paula tried to write stories in 1976 (when she was working as a tax lady for IRS), and gave up in despair. After she decided to go to law school and was selected as Articles Editor for the University of Oregon School of Law, she edited for the law journal, and then clerked for three years for a local federal judge, writing eight hours a day. At times, she felt she had learned some of the craft, and tried again. She sold her first two novels late in 1989 to two separate publishers, and settled with Del Rey for three more novels.

Her agent recommended she try another pen name to assist sales, and so she published her "Cloudships of Orion" trilogy with Roc under the name "P.K. McAllister." Her "gypsies in space" trilogy garnered good reviews. A few years later, under yet another pen name, Diana Marcellas, Paula sold her fantasy trilogy, "Witch of Two Suns" to Tor.

Although she continued to write regularly during her subsequent lawyer years, her job required a lot of overtime. she often gave away some of her overtime hours to her staff at the Tribe, enough to add up to sixty hours a week, where she spent four years as juvenile prosecutor. In March 2012 she fell off her porch and fractured her lumbar spine, eventually needing surgery in November 2012. Her recovery took an entire year, and she tried to work half-time for a local law firm, but was eventually pronounced disabled.

This note is by Paula herself: "In May 2015 Paula's father died and she inherited his house in Walla Walla, Washington, her hometown—and so she has moved home! . And suddenly she finds herself writing full-time, a dream of her whole life. The disability limits things a bit, but she hopes to write another "Eleven," as she calls her published novels, and finds a way to share those stories with her readers.

Some of Paula's stories still in her head date back to college life, and she now has time to start writing some of them, as well as the new stories. She has read SF since the age of 12, adores the genre for its innovation and wide horizons, and could happily spend the rest of her retirement, as long as it lasts (she is now a youthful 64) while writing SF."

Paula Downing King passed on December 17, 2017 in her Walla Walla, Washington home.

== Bibliography ==
=== Novels ===
- "Mad Roy's Light" (New York: Baen Books, 1990) as Paula King
- "Rinn's Star" (New York: Ballantine Books/Del Rey, 1990) as Paula E. Downing
- "Flare Star" (New York: Ballantine Books/Del Rey, 1992) as Paula E. Downing
- "Fallway" (New York: Ballantine Books/Del Rey, 1993) as Paula E. Downing
- "A Whisper of Time" (New York: Ballantine Books/Del Rey, 1994) as Paula E. Downing

Series: The Cloudships of Orion

- "Siduri's Net" (New York: Penguin/Roc, 1994) as P.K. McAllister
- "Maia's Veil" (New York: Penguin/Roc, 1995) as P.K. McAllister
- "Orion's Dagger" (New York: Penguin/Roc, 1996) as P.K. McAllister

Series: Witch of Two Suns (as Diana Marcellas)

- "Mother Ocean, Daughter Sea" (New York: Tor, 2001), as Diana Marcellas
- "The Sea Lark's Song" (New York: Tor, 2002), as Diana Marcellas
- "Twilight Rising, Serpent's Dream" (New York: Tor, 2004), as Diana Marcellas
