= Paulis (disambiguation) =

Paulis is the former name of Isiro, the capital of Haut-Uele Province in the northeastern part of the Democratic Republic of the Congo.

Paulis may also refer to:

- Păuliș, commune in Arad County, Romania
- Păuliș, village in the commune Șoimuș in Hunedoara County, Transylvania, Romania
- Ilse Paulis (born 1993), Dutch rower

== See also ==
- Paulus (disambiguation)
- Powlus, surname
- Pauli, given name and surname
