= Paula (surname) =

- Alejandro Felipe Paula (1937–2018), Curaçaoan academic, historian and politician
- António Paula (born 1937), Portuguese footballer
- Benito di Paula (1941–2026), Brazilian singer-songwriter, composer, pianist and writer
- Julia Cornelia Paula, Roman noblewoman and Empress of Rome
- Netinho de Paula (born 1970), Brazilian presenter, singer, composer, actor and politician
- Romina Paula, Argentinian writer, playwright, stage and film actress, and film director
