= Paulus =

Paulus is the original Latin form of the English masculin given name Paul. It may refer to:

== Ancient Romans ==
- Julius Paulus (fl. 222–235 AD), Roman jurist
- Paulus (consul 496), politician of the Eastern Roman Empire
- Paulus (consul 512), politician of the Eastern Roman Empire
- Paul of Aegina or Paulus Aegineta (625–690 AD), surgeon of the Eastern Roman Empire
- Paulus Alexandrinus (fl. 378 AD), Roman astrologer
- Paulus Catena (fl. 353–362 AD), Roman notary
- Lucius Aemilius Paullus Macedonicus (229–160 BC), Roman general

== Religious figures ==
=== Popes ===
- Pope Paul I (Pope from 757 to 767)
- Pope Paul II (Pope from 1464 to 1471)
- Pope Paul III (Pope from 1534 to 1549)
- Pope Paul IV (Pope from 1555 to 1559)
- Pope Paul V (Pope from 1605 to 1621)
- Pope Paul VI (Pope from 1963 to 1978)

=== Other Christians ===
- Paul the Apostle (5–67 AD)
- Paulus (bishop of Alexandretta) (fl. 518), Bishop of Alexandria Minor
- Paul the Deacon or Paulus Diaconus (c. 720–800 AD), Italian Benedictine monk
- Paulus Jovius (1483–1552), Italian bishop

== Other ==
- Paulus (singer), stage name of Jean-Paulin Habans (1845–1908), French singer, entertainer and theatre entrepreneur
- Paulus Castrensis (fl. 1390–1441), Italian jurist
- Paulus Jansen (born 1954), Dutch politician
- Paulus Potter (1625–1654), Dutch painter
- Paulus Rundgren, Finnish ice hockey player

== Fictional characters ==
- Paulus the woodgnome, children's book character by Jan van Oort (Jean Dulieu)

== See also ==
- Paulus (surname), includes a list of people with the surname
- Paulis (disambiguation)
- Paullus (praenomen)
- Powless, a surname
