= Pawlas =

Pawlas is a Polish surname. Notable people with the surname include:

- Elżbieta Pawlas (born 1934), Polish fencer
- Zygmunt Pawlas (1930–2001), Polish fencer

== See also ==
- Pavlas
