= Frederick Pawla =

British-American painter

Frederick Alexander Pawla, (September 6, 1876 – December 18, 1964) a painter and muralist, was born in Wimbledon, England on September 6, 1876. He came to the United States as a boy and at 14 enlisted in the Navy and retired following World War I. He studied art in Europe and was active in New York City before moving to Santa Barbara, California in the 1920s. He exhibited locally and maintained a home there through the 1940s.

Pawla is well known for his public murals in California, including a 1929 commissioned by the Works Progress Administration for Burlingame High School in California. In 1931, Pawla returned to New York to pursue further commissions. Pawla was mostly active as an artist in California, but he also spent time in Australia and was a member of the Royal Art Society in New South Wales. Pawla lived out the last years of his life as a resident of Monterey, California before his death at Fort Ord, California on December 18, 1964. Pawla's most recognizable work is "Sailboat, Santa Barbara", which has been widely reproduced.

His work includes marines, coastal scenes, and landscapes. Member: Royal Art Society (New South Wales); Santa Barbara Art Ass'n; San Diego Artists Society; Santa Cruz Arts League.

== Exhibits ==
The Santa Cruz Art League, 1929; Golden Gate International Expo, 1939. Murals: Burlingame High School in Burlingame, California; Dept. of Public Markets (NYC); Rainbow Room, Rockefeller Center (New York City); War Dept (Washington, DC); Cloister Hotel (Sea Island, GA); Surfside Hotel (Miami Beach).
