= Paulines (Thrace) =

Town of ancient Thrace

Coordinates: 41°02′26″N 28°56′30″E

Paulines was a town of ancient Thrace, inhabited during Byzantine times.

Its site is located outside the Blachernai walls in European Turkey.
