= Patrick Ewing =

Jamaican-American basketball player and coach (born 1962)

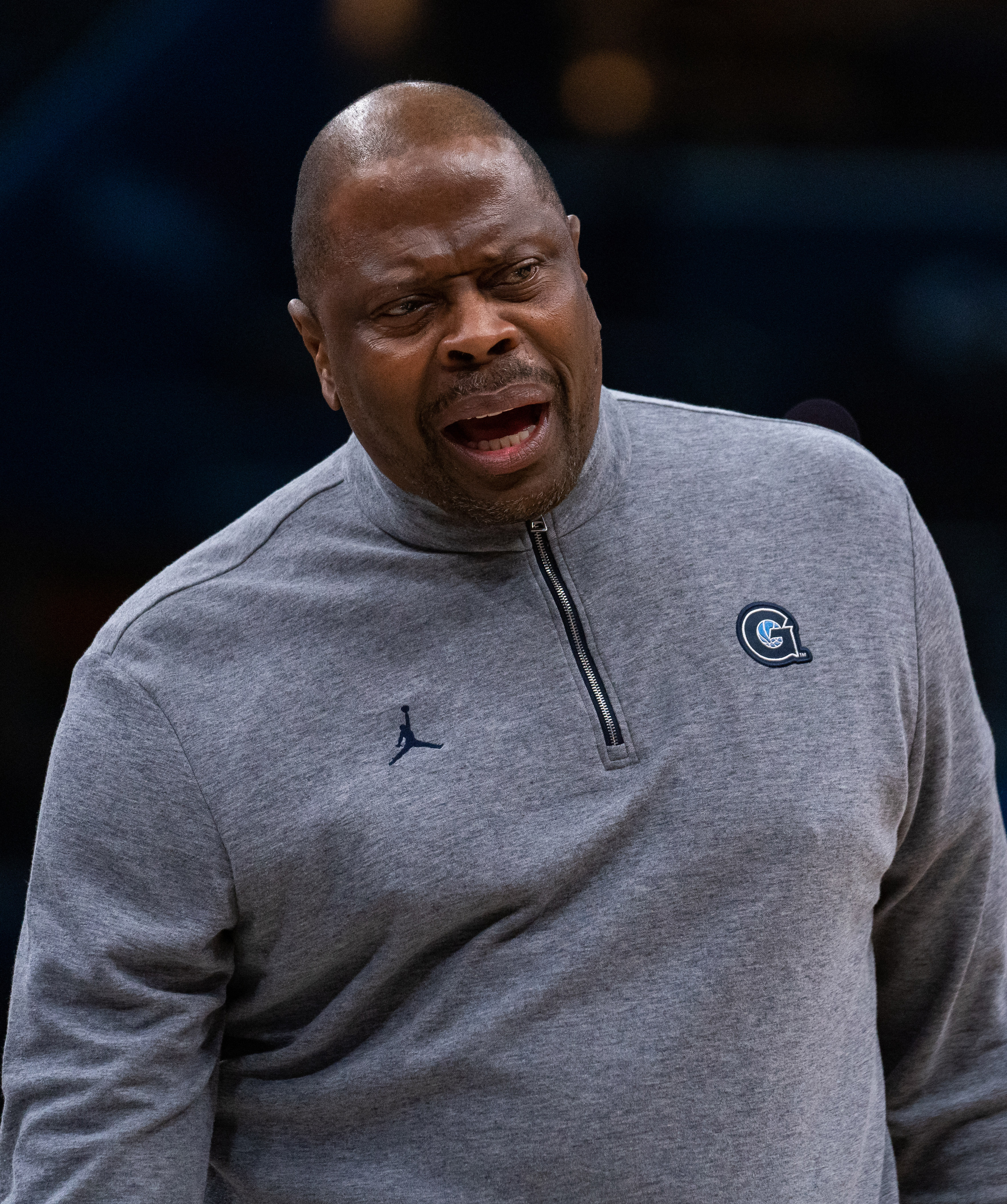
- Ewing in 2021

Washington Wizards
- Title: Assistant coach
- League: NBA

Personal information
- Born: August 5, 1962 (age 64) Kingston, Jamaica
- Listed height: 7 ft 0 in (2.13 m)
- Listed weight: 240 lb (109 kg)

Career information
- High school: Cambridge Rindge and Latin (Cambridge, Massachusetts)
- College: Georgetown (1981–1985)
- NBA draft: 1985: 1st round, 1st overall pick
- Drafted by: New York Knicks
- Playing career: 1985–2002
- Position: Center
- Number: 33, 6
- Coaching career: 2002–present

Career history

Playing
- 1985–2000: New York Knicks
- 2000–2001: Seattle SuperSonics
- 2001–2002: Orlando Magic

Career highlights
- As player: 11× NBA All-Star (1986, 1988–1997); All-NBA First Team (1990); 6× All-NBA Second Team (1988, 1989, 1991–1993, 1997); 3× NBA All-Defensive Second Team (1988, 1989, 1992); NBA Rookie of the Year (1986); NBA All-Rookie Team (1986); NBA anniversary team (50th, 75th); No. 33 retired by New York Knicks; NCAA champion (1984); NCAA Final Four Most Outstanding Player (1984); National college player of the year (1985); 3× Consensus first-team All-American (1983–1985); 2× Big East Player of the Year (1984, 1985); 4× Big East Defensive Player of the Year (1982–1985); 3× First-team All-Big East (1983–1985); Second-team All-Big East (1982); National high school player of the year (1981); McDonald's All-American (1981); 2× First-team Parade All-American (1980, 1981); Third-team Parade All-American (1979); As head coach: Big East tournament champion (2021); As ambassador: NBA champion (2026); NBA Cup champion (2025)

Career NBA statistics
- Points: 24,815 (21.0 ppg)
- Rebounds: 11,617 (9.8 rpg)
- Blocks: 2,894 (2.4 bpg)
- Stats at NBA.com
- Stats at Basketball Reference
- Basketball Hall of Fame
- Collegiate Basketball Hall of Fame
Medals
Men's basketball
Representing United States
Olympic Games
Gold medal – first place	1984 Los Angeles	Men's basketball
Gold medal – first place	1992 Barcelona	Men's basketball
Americas Championship
Gold medal – first place	1992 Portland	Team competition

Patrick Aloysius Ewing Sr. (born August 5, 1962) is a Jamaican-American professional basketball coach and former player who currently serves as an assistant coach for the Washington Wizards of the National Basketball Association (NBA). He spent most of his 17-year playing career as the starting center for the New York Knicks before ending his playing career with brief stints with the Seattle SuperSonics and Orlando Magic, each tenure only lasting one season. Ewing is regarded as one of the greatest centers and Knicks players of all time, playing a dominant role in New York's 1990s success, and becoming an NBA champion with the team in 2026 in a front office role.

Highly recruited out of Cambridge, Massachusetts, Ewing played center for the Georgetown Hoyas for four seasons, during which the team reached the NCAA championship game three times. ESPN in 2008 designated him the 16th-greatest college basketball player of all time. He had a seventeen-year NBA career, predominantly playing for the New York Knicks, where he was an eleven-time all-star and named to seven All-NBA teams. The Knicks appeared in the NBA Finals twice (1994 and 1999) during his tenure. He won Olympic gold medals as a member of the 1984 and 1992 United States men's Olympic basketball teams. Ewing was selected as one of the 50 Greatest Players in NBA History in 1996 and as one of the 75 Greatest Players in NBA History in 2021. He is a two-time inductee into the Basketball Hall of Fame in Springfield, Massachusetts (in 2008 for his individual career and in 2010 as a member of the 1992 Olympic team). Additionally, he was inducted into the U.S. Olympic Hall of Fame as a member of the "Dream Team" in 2009. His number 33 was retired by the Knicks in 2003.

== Early life ==
Ewing was born on August 5, 1962, in Kingston, Jamaica, to Carl and Dorothy Ewing. He was born one day before Jamaica declared independence. As a child, he excelled at cricket and soccer. In 1975, Ewing moved to the United States and settled with his family in the Greater Boston area in Cambridge, Massachusetts.

Ewing learned to play basketball at Cambridge Rindge and Latin School with the help of John Fountain and his coach Mike Jarvis. With only a few years of playing experience, Ewing developed into one of the best high school players in the country, and among the most intimidating forces ever seen at the level given his size and athleticism. He was named a Parade All-American three times, earning third-team honors in 1979 and first-team selections in both 1980 and 1981. As a senior, he was also named Mr. Basketball USA, Parade Player of the Year, and MaxPreps National Player of the Year. Due to his stature and the team's dominance, Ewing was subject to taunts and jeers from hostile away crowds. Once rival fans even rocked the team bus when Ewing's squad arrived to play an away game. Ewing led Cambridge Rindge and Latin to three consecutive Massachusetts Div. I state championships from 1979 to 1981. In order to prepare for college, Ewing joined the MIT-Wellesley Upward Bound Program.

== College career ==
As a senior in high school, Ewing signed a letter of intent to play for coach John Thompson at Georgetown University. Ewing made his announcement in Boston, in a room full of fans who were hoping for him to play for local schools Boston College or Boston University; when Ewing announced his decision to play at Georgetown, the fans left the room. During his recruitment, Ewing was very close to signing a letter of intent to play for Dean Smith and the University of North Carolina; however, while on his recruiting visit, he witnessed a nearby rally for the Ku Klux Klan, which dissuaded him from going there. Ewing made six recruiting visits in all; he also visited UCLA and Villanova.

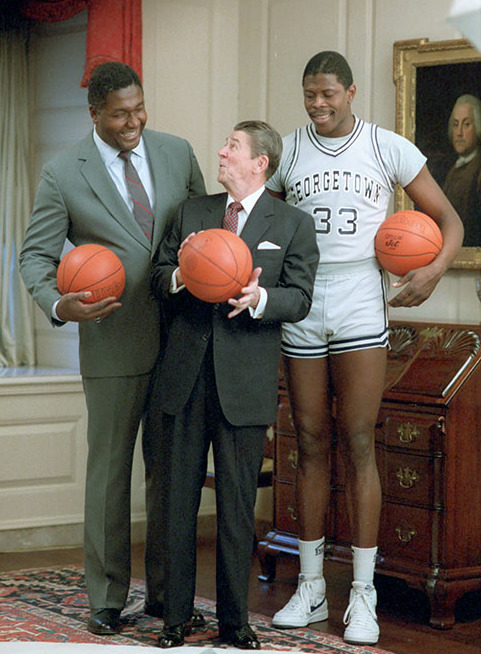
President Ronald Reagan with John Thompson and Ewing after Georgetown won the 1984 NCAA Championship.

As a freshman during the 1981–82 season, Ewing became one of the first college players to start and star on the varsity team as a freshman. That year, Ewing led the Hoyas to their second Big East tournament title in school history and a #1 seed in the NCAA Tournament. In the tournament, the Hoyas advanced to their first Final Four since 1943, where they defeated the University of Louisville, 50–46, to set up a showdown in the NCAA Final against North Carolina. In one of the most star-studded championship games in NCAA history, Ewing was called for goaltending five times in the first half (later revealed to be intentional at the behest of coach John Thompson), setting the tone for the Hoyas and making his presence felt. The Hoyas led late in the game, but a shot by future NBA superstar Michael Jordan gave North Carolina the lead. Georgetown still had a chance at winning the game in the final seconds, but Freddy Brown mistakenly threw a bad pass directly to opposing player James Worthy, sealing the win for the Tar Heels.

For the 1982–83 season, Ewing and the Hoyas began the season as the second-seeded ranked team in the country. An early-season showdown with #1 ranked Virginia and their star center Ralph Sampson was dubbed the "Game of the Decade". Virginia's veteran team won, 68–63, but Ewing at one point slam-dunked right over Sampson, a play which established Ewing as a dominating "big man". The Hoyas posted a 22–10 record for the season and made another NCAA Tournament appearance, but Georgetown was defeated in the second round of the tournament by Memphis State. This would be the only season in Ewing's Georgetown career where they did not make it at least as far as the National Championship game.

In the 1983–84 season, Ewing led Georgetown to the Big East regular-season championship, the Big East tournament championship and another #1 seed in the NCAA Tournament. Also, he was named the Big East Player of the Year. The Hoyas ultimately advanced to the Final Four for the third time in school history (and second time with Ewing) to face Kentucky, a team which had never lost a national semifinal game and was led by the "Twin Towers", Sam Bowie and Melvin Turpin. Georgetown was able to turn an early 12-point deficit into a 53–40 win to advance to the National Championship game. In the final, the Hoyas faced the University of Houston, led by future Hall of Fame center Hakeem Olajuwon. Ewing and Georgetown prevailed with an 84–75 victory, giving the school its first and only NCAA Championship in school history. Ewing was named the tournament's Most Outstanding Player.

For the 1984–85 season, Ewing's senior year, Georgetown was ranked #1 in the nation for the majority of the campaign. Ewing was again named the Big East Player of the Year and the team won the Big East tournament title yet again. They entered the NCAA tournament as the #1 overall seed of the East Region, where they wound up advancing to another Final Four, their third in four years. In the National Semifinal game, Georgetown faced their Big East rivals, St. John's and Chris Mullin, the fourth meeting between the schools that year. The Hoyas easily defeated the Redmen 77–59, setting up a matchup with another Big East rival in unranked Villanova for the title. An overwhelming favorite going into the game, Georgetown was upset by the Wildcats 66–64, who shot a record 78.6 percent (22 of 28) from the floor, denying Ewing and Georgetown back-to-back titles. At the conclusion of the season, Ewing was awarded the Naismith Player of the Year Award and the Associated Press Player of the Year.

Ewing's four-year college career is cited as one of the most successful college runs of all time. Among his many accomplishments, he helped Georgetown reach the final game of the NCAA Tournament three out of four years, win three Big East tournament titles, four Big East Defensive Player of the Year awards and was named a first-team All-American three times. He also left a cultural impact on the sport in a variety of ways. He was one of the first freshmen to not only start for but lead a major college basketball team, something unheard of back in his era. Also, he developed a habit of wearing a short-sleeved T-shirt underneath his jersey, which started a fashion trend among young athletes that lasts to this day.

== NBA career ==
=== New York Knicks (1985–2000) ===
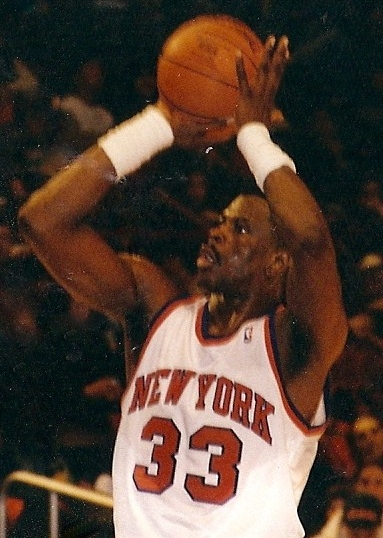
Ewing played 15 seasons (1985–2000) with the New York Knicks.

We've had the Mikan era, the Russell era, the Kareem era ... now we'll have the Ewing era.

— Pat O'Brien, quoting an unnamed NBA scouting director just before the 1985 NBA draft lottery.

Ewing was expected to be the top pick in the 1985 NBA draft. Beginning with the 1985 draft, every team that qualified for the playoffs received positions based on their winning percentage, and the teams that did not were placed in a lottery. In the first lottery, each team had its name and logo put in an envelope, and the envelopes were placed into a hopper and spun to shuffle them. Once done, Commissioner David Stern then drew an envelope from inside to determine who would pick first. In a move that would create controversy for years to come, the envelope Stern drew was the one belonging to the New York Knicks, inviting allegations the draw was rigged; Stern had also grown up a Knicks fan. The Knicks drafted Ewing, as expected, beginning a 15-year relationship. They then signed him to a 10-year, $32 million contract, a contract that The New York Times years later described as "a tremendous contract at that time or any time."

Although injuries marred his first year in the league, he was voted NBA Rookie of the Year and named to the NBA All-Rookie First Team after averaging 20 points, 9 rebounds, and 2 blocks per game. Soon after he was considered one of the premier centers in the league. Ewing enjoyed a successful career; eleven times named an NBA All-Star, once named to the All-NBA First Team, six times a member of the All-NBA Second Team, and named to the NBA All-Defensive Second Team three times. He was a member of the original Dream Team at the 1992 Olympic Games. He was named one of the 50 Greatest Players in NBA History.

In the 1992 Eastern Conference Semifinals, the Knicks played the defending NBA champion Chicago Bulls and Michael Jordan. Ewing finished Game 1 with 34 points, 16 rebounds, and 6 blocks, and the Knicks beat Chicago 94–89. The Knicks were facing elimination in Game 6 when Ewing had one of the greatest games of his career. The team trailed 3–2 in the series, and Ewing was limited physically by a bad ankle sprain, but he helped the Knicks beat the Bulls 100–86 by scoring 27 points. NBC announcer Marv Albert called it a "Willis Reed-type performance", but the Knicks were ultimately eliminated in Game 7 in a blowout, 110–81.

In an April 14, 1993, game, between the Knicks and the Charlotte Hornets, Muggsy Bogues, a 5-foot-3-inch-tall (1.60 m) point guard for the Hornets, managed to knock the ball loose as Ewing was shooting. The team looked like it was going to advance to the NBA Finals when they took a 2–0 lead over Michael Jordan and the Chicago Bulls. Both teams battled well, each winning on its home court in the first 4 games. However, the Bulls stunned the Ewing-led Knicks, winning Game 5 in New York 97–94 after Ewing's teammate, Charles Smith, was repeatedly blocked down low by Bulls defenders on the game's final possession. The Bulls would go on to win Game 6 96–88 and then claim their third straight NBA title. This would be one more season in which Ewing had to deal with no championships, despite the fact that the Knicks had the best regular-season record in the Eastern Conference at 60–22 and had the second-best record in the NBA, behind the Phoenix Suns, who were 62–20.

With Jordan out of the league, 1993–94 was considered a wide-open year in the NBA, and Ewing had declared that 1994 would be the Knicks' year. He was a main contributor to the Knicks' run to the 1994 NBA Finals, in which the Knicks—in the Finals for the first time since 1973—lost in the final seconds of Games 6 and 7 to Hakeem Olajuwon's Houston Rockets. The Knicks, with Ewing leading them, had to survive a grueling trek through the playoffs simply to reach the Finals. They defeated the Bulls and Scottie Pippen in seven games in the 1994 Eastern Conference Semifinals (all seven games were won by the home team), and defeated Reggie Miller's Indiana Pacers in the Conference Finals, which also took seven games to decide. In the Finals, the Knicks stole Game 2 in Houston, but could not hold court at home, dropping Game 3 at the Garden. The Knicks then won the next two games to return to Houston ahead 3–2. However, the Rockets won the next two games. Ewing made the most of his playoff run by setting a record for most blocked shots in a Finals series with 30 (later broken by Tim Duncan in 2003 with 32). He also set an NBA Finals record for most blocked shots in a single game, with 8 (surpassed by Dwight Howard in 2009).

The following year, a potential game-tying finger roll by Ewing rimmed out in the dwindling seconds of Game 7 of the Eastern Conference Semifinals, resulting in a loss to the Indiana Pacers. In the 1995–96 season, Ewing and the Knicks were eliminated in the Eastern Conference Semifinals in five games by the record-setting 1995–96 Bulls, who won 72 games that year en route to their fourth championship.

In the 1997 playoffs, the Knicks faced the Miami Heat in the Eastern Conference Semifinals. Ewing was involved in a Game 5 brawl where both teams' benches got involved. The Knicks, who were up 3–1 in the series going into Game 5, lost the next three games and were eliminated.

On December 20, 1997, in a game against the Milwaukee Bucks at the Bradley Center, Ewing was fouled by Andrew Lang while attempting a dunk. Ewing fell awkwardly and landed with all of his weight on his shooting hand. The result was a severely damaged wrist, with Ewing suffering a displaced fracture, a complete dislocation of the lunate bone, and torn ligaments. These injuries required emergency surgery to prevent nerve damage, and it was said that Ewing suffered injuries that were usually reserved for victims of vehicular accidents.

Ewing, who had only missed 20 games in the previous ten seasons, missed the remaining 56 games of the season, but he was able to rehabilitate the injury faster than expected, and as the playoffs began Ewing was talking about returning. The Heat and Knicks met in the playoffs for the second straight year, this time in the first round. The series went to a decisive fifth game, but the Knicks avenged their loss to Miami the year before by beating the Heat in Miami 98–81. Ewing returned for Game 2 of the Eastern Conference Semifinals against the Pacers. His presence was not enough, however, as the Knicks fell to the Pacers in five games.

The following season, Ewing and the Knicks qualified as the East's eighth seed in a lockout-shortened season. Although battling an achilles tendon injury, Ewing led the Knicks to another victory over the Heat in the first round, 3–2. In the series-clinching Game 5, he scored 22 points and grabbed 11 rebounds. They followed that up by sweeping the Atlanta Hawks, and defeated the Pacers in the Conference Finals in 6 games, despite Ewing's injury finally forcing him out of action. The Knicks could not, however, complete their Cinderella run, as they lost in the Finals to the San Antonio Spurs, 4–1.

In Ewing's final season with the Knicks in 1999–2000, the team finished as the third seed in the East behind the Pacers and Heat. The team advanced to the Conference Finals again, sweeping the Toronto Raptors and beating the Heat for the third straight year in seven games, but could not defeat the Pacers and fell in six games. In his last year with the Knicks, Ewing had a game-winning slam dunk over Alonzo Mourning in Game 7 of the Eastern Conference Semifinals to lead the Knicks to the Eastern Conference Finals. During his final season with the Knicks, Ewing played in his 1,000th NBA game, finishing his Knick career with a franchise-record 1,039 games played in a Knick uniform (he is the only player to play 1,000 games with the Knicks).

=== Post-Knicks career ===
During the 2000 off-season, Ewing requested a trade from New York, and the Knicks complied, sending Ewing to the Seattle SuperSonics in a four-team trade; the Knicks also sent Chris Dudley to Phoenix in the deal, and received Glen Rice, Luc Longley, Travis Knight, Vladimir Stepania, Lazaro Borrell, Vernon Maxwell, two first-round draft picks (from the Los Angeles Lakers and Seattle) and two second-round draft picks from Seattle. After one season with the SuperSonics and another with the Orlando Magic, he announced his retirement on September 18, 2002.

In 1,183 games over 17 seasons, Ewing averaged 21.0 points, 9.8 rebounds, and 2.4 blocks per game, and averaged better than a 50% shooting percentage. The Knicks’ all-time leading scorer with 23,665 points, as of 2021, Ewing was ranked 23rd on the NBA scoring list with 24,815 points.

Ewing played 1,039 games for the Knicks. On February 28, 2003, his jersey number 33 was retired by the team in a ceremony at Madison Square Garden during which his jersey was raised to the Garden rafters. For the first time ever, Ewing represented the Knicks during the NBA draft lottery on May 14, 2019. They got the third overall pick in the 2019 NBA draft. In October 2024, Ewing rejoined the Knicks as a basketball ambassador. In June 2026, in his third year in the Knicks front office, Ewing became an NBA Champion for the first time with New York's victory in five games over the San Antonio Spurs.

== National team career ==
Ewing won Olympic gold medals as a member of the 1984 and 1992 United States men's basketball teams. In 1984, Ewing averaged 11.0 points in eight games, and was the tournament's leading shot blocker with 18. The Naismith Memorial Basketball Hall of Fame referred to the 1992 "Dream Team" as "the greatest collection of basketball talent on the planet".

== Awards and honors ==
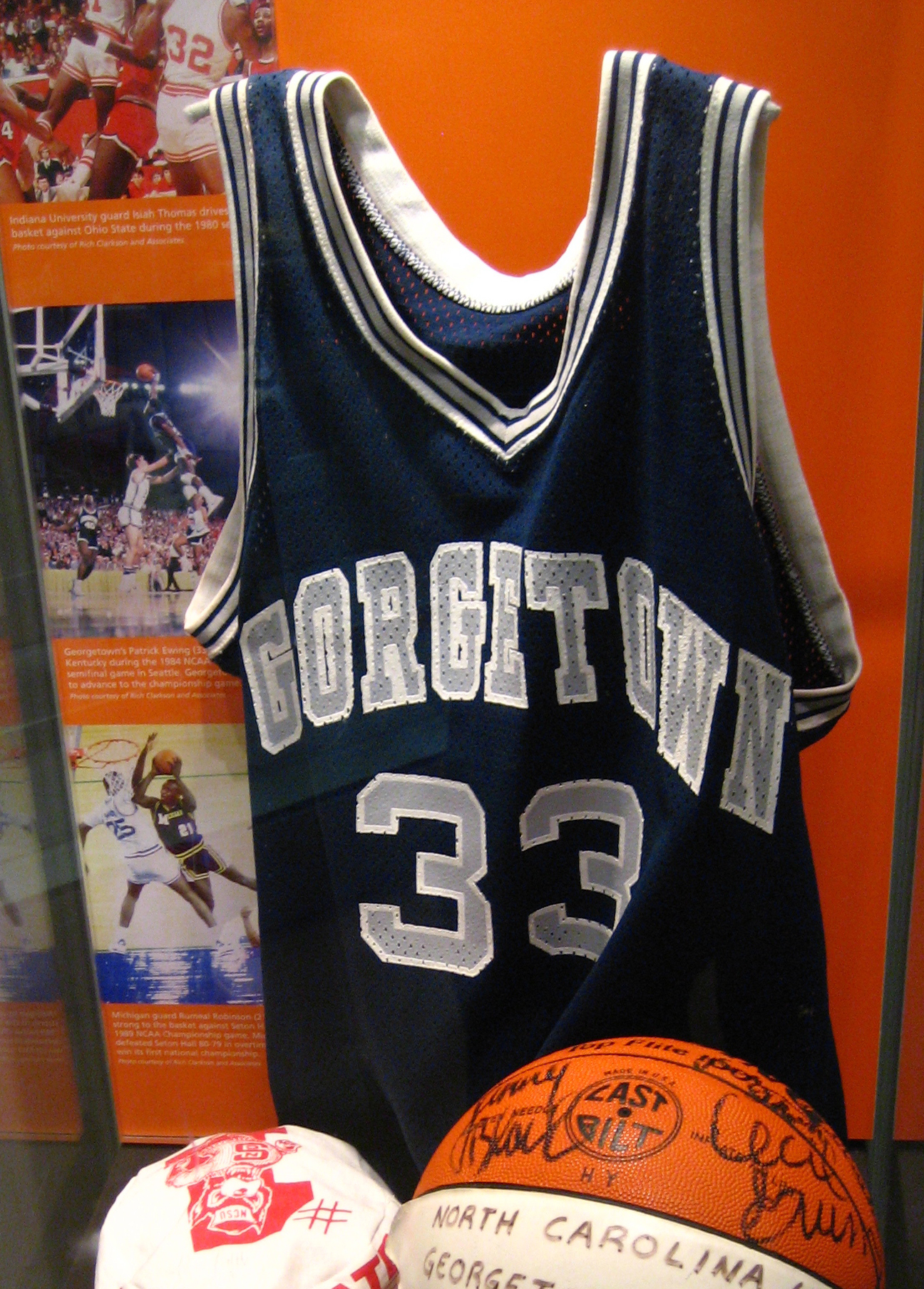
Ewing's college jersey in the Basketball Hall of Fame museum in Springfield, Massachusetts.

- Rookie of the Year (1986)
- All-NBA First Team (1990)
- All-NBA Second Team (1988, 1989, 1991, 1992, 1993, 1997)
- NBA All-Defensive Second Team (1988, 1989, 1992)
- 11-time All-Star; One of 50 Greatest Players in NBA History (1996)
- 2-time Olympic gold medalist (1984, 1992)
- 3-time All-American (1983–1985)
- NCAA basketball tournament Most Outstanding Player (1984)
- Naismith College Player of the Year (1985).
- AP College Player of the Year (1985)
- NABC Player of the Year (1985)
- Sporting News College Player of the Year (1985)
- Adolph Rupp Trophy (1985)
- No. 33 retired for the New York Knicks
- Basketball Hall of Fame inductee (in 2008 as an individual and 2010 as a member of the Dream Team)
- NBA 75th Anniversary Team (2021)
- NBA 50th Anniversary Team (1996)
- McDonald's Open champion (1990)
- McDonald's Open MVP (1990)

Ewing was a defensive stalwart throughout his basketball career, although he often had difficulty placing on the NBA All-Defensive Team due to the defensive prowess of his contemporaries Hakeem Olajuwon and David Robinson.

In 1993, he led the NBA with 789 defensive rebounds. He was top ten in field goal percentage eight times, top ten in rebounds per game and total rebounds eight times, top ten in points and points per game eight times, and top ten in blocks per game for 13 years.

In 1999, Ewing became the 10th player in NBA history to record 22,000 points and 10,000 rebounds.

== Career statistics ==
Legend
GP	Games played	GS	Games started	MPG	Minutes per game
FG%	Field goal percentage	3P%	3-point field goal percentage	FT%	Free throw percentage
RPG	Rebounds per game	APG	Assists per game	SPG	Steals per game
BPG	Blocks per game	PPG	Points per game	**Bold**	Career high

=== NBA ===
==== Regular season ====
Year	Team	GP	GS	MPG	FG%	3P%	FT%	RPG	APG	SPG	BPG	PPG
1985–86	New York	50	50	35.4	.474	.000	.739	9.0	2.0	1.1	2.1	20.0
1986–87	New York	63	63	35.0	.503	.000	.713	8.8	1.7	1.4	2.3	21.5
1987–88	New York	**82**	**82**	31.0	.555	.000	.716	8.2	1.5	1.3	3.0	20.2
1988–89	New York	80	80	36.2	**.567**	.000	.746	9.3	2.4	**1.5**	3.5	22.7
1989–90	New York	**82**	**82**	**38.6**	.551	.250	**.775**	10.9	2.2	1.0	**4.0**	**28.6**
1990–91	New York	81	81	38.3	.514	.000	.745	11.2	**3.0**	1.0	3.2	26.6
1991–92	New York	**82**	**82**	38.4	.522	.167	.738	11.2	1.9	1.1	3.0	24.0
1992–93	New York	81	81	37.1	.503	.143	.719	**12.1**	1.9	.9	2.0	24.2
1993–94	New York	79	79	37.6	.496	**.286**	.765	11.2	2.3	1.1	2.7	24.5
1994–95	New York	79	79	37.0	.503	.286	.750	11.0	2.7	.9	2.0	23.9
1995–96	New York	76	76	36.6	.466	.143	.761	10.6	2.1	.9	2.4	22.5
1996–97	New York	78	78	37.0	.488	.222	.754	10.7	2.0	.9	2.4	22.4
1997–98	New York	26	26	32.6	.504	.000	.720	10.2	1.1	.6	2.2	20.8
1998–99	New York	38	38	34.2	.435	.000	.706	9.9	1.1	.8	2.6	17.3
1999–00	New York	62	62	32.8	.435	.000	.731	9.7	.9	.6	1.4	15.0
2000–01	Seattle	79	79	26.7	.430	.000	.685	7.4	1.2	.7	1.2	9.6
2001–02	Orlando	65	4	13.9	.444	.000	.701	4.0	.5	.3	.7	6.0
Career		1,183	1,122	34.3	.504	.152	.740	9.8	1.9	1.0	2.5	21.0
All-Star		9	3	21.1	.537	.000	.692	6.7	.8	1.2	1.8	11.8

==== Playoffs ====
Year	Team	GP	GS	MPG	FG%	3P%	FT%	RPG	APG	SPG	BPG	PPG
1988	New York	4	4	38.3	.491	.000	**.864**	**12.8**	2.5	**1.5**	**3.3**	18.8
1989	New York	9	9	37.8	.486	—	.750	10.0	2.2	1.0	2.0	19.9
1990	New York	10	10	39.5	.521	.500	.823	10.5	**3.1**	1.3	2.0	**29.4**
1991	New York	3	3	36.7	.400	—	.778	10.0	2.0	.3	1.7	16.7
1992	New York	12	12	40.2	.456	.000	.740	11.1	2.3	.6	2.6	22.7
1993	New York	15	15	40.3	.512	**1.000**	.638	10.9	2.4	1.1	2.1	25.5
1994	New York	**25**	**25**	**41.3**	.437	.364	.740	11.7	2.6	1.3	3.0	21.9
1995	New York	11	11	36.3	.513	.333	.686	9.6	2.5	.5	2.3	19.0
1996	New York	8	8	41.0	.474	.500	.651	10.6	1.9	.1	3.1	21.5
1997	New York	9	9	39.7	**.527**	.000	.643	10.6	1.9	.3	2.4	22.6
1998	New York	4	4	33.0	.357	—	.593	8.0	1.3	.8	1.3	14.0
1999	New York	10	10	31.5	.430	—	.593	8.7	.5	.6	.7	13.1
2000	New York	14	14	32.9	.418	—	.697	9.5	.4	1.1	1.4	14.6
2002	Orlando	4	0	16.8	.320	.000	.588	5.5	1.0	.3	1.0	6.5
Career		139	135	37.5	.469	.348	.718	10.3	2.0	.9	2.2	20.2

=== College ===
*	Led NCAA Division I

Year	Team	GP	GS	MPG	FG%	3P%	FT%	RPG	APG	SPG	BPG	PPG
1981–82	Georgetown	**37***	36	28.8	.631	–	.617	7.5	.6	1.1	3.2	12.7
1982–83	Georgetown	32	32	**32.0**	.570	–	.629	**10.2**	.8	**1.5**	3.3	**17.7**
1983–84	Georgetown	**37***	33	31.9	**.658**	–	**.656**	10.0	.8	.9	**3.6**	16.4
1984–85	Georgetown	**37**	**37**	30.6	.625	–	.638	9.2	**1.3**	1.1	**3.6**	14.6
Career		143	138	30.8	.620	–	.635	9.2	.9	1.2	3.4	15.3

== Coaching career ==
From 2002 to 2003, Ewing served as an assistant coach for the Washington Wizards under the ownership of his longtime rival Michael Jordan. From 2003 through 2006, Ewing was an assistant with the Houston Rockets, before resigning to spend more time with his family. On July 3, 2007, Ewing was one of four assistants hired to serve under first-year Orlando Magic head coach Stan Van Gundy for the 2007–08 season.

The Magic reached the 2009 NBA Finals, where they lost to the Los Angeles Lakers. He correctly predicted a win in Game 7 of the second round against the defending champion Boston Celtics. Later in the playoffs, Ewing saw Magic captain Dwight Howard set a new NBA Finals record for most blocked shots in a single Finals game, with nine in Game 4, surpassing the previous record of eight by Ewing himself in Game 5 of the 1994 Finals.

In 2010, Ewing finally got the opportunity to coach his son Patrick Ewing Jr. in the 2010 summer league. Ewing Jr. played for the Magic.

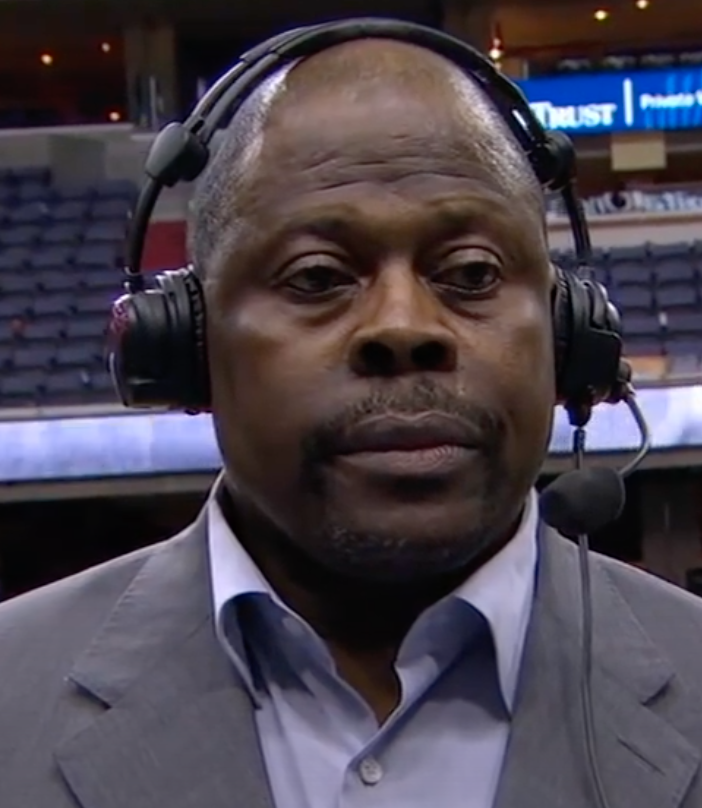
Ewing being interviewed as Georgetown head coach in 2018

In 2013, Ewing became an assistant coach with the Charlotte Bobcats (now Charlotte Hornets). On November 8, 2013, Ewing became the Bobcats' interim head coach due to regular head coach Steve Clifford having heart surgery. He lost his first game 101–91 against his former team, the Knicks.

On April 3, 2017, Ewing was hired as head coach of his former college team, the Georgetown Hoyas. In his first season as head coach, the Hoyas were 15–15 (5–13 in the Big East). The season ended without any postseason tournament play. In Ewing's second season, Georgetown was 19–14, and finished tied in third place in the Big East with a 9–9 record. The Hoyas were awarded a bid in the 2019 National Invitation Tournament, their first postseason tournament since 2015. James Akinjo was named the Big East Rookie of the Year, and fellow freshmen Mac McClung and Josh Leblanc joined him on the Big East All-Freshman Team. In Ewing's third season, the Hoyas finished 15–17 overall and 5–13 in the Big East and lost in the first round of the 2020 Big East tournament the day before all further postseason play was cancelled due to the onset of the COVID-19 pandemic.

In Ewing's fourth season, after finishing the regular season with a record of 13–13 overall and 7–9 in the Big East, he led the Hoyas to the 2021 Big East Conference tournament championship as the eighth seed in the tournament. They defeated the first-seeded Villanova Wildcats in the quarterfinals. In the championship game, Georgetown defeated the second-seeded Creighton Bluejays 73–48, and qualified for the 2021 NCAA Division I basketball tournament. This marked Georgetown's first NCAA tournament appearance since the 2014–15 season, breaking their longest NCAA drought in the modern era. The Hoyas were unable to build on this success in Ewing's fifth season however, posting an overall record of 6–25 and going winless in Big East Conference play at 0–19 in the regular season followed by a first-round loss in the 2022 Big East tournament. In Ewing's sixth season, Georgetown finished with an overall record of 7–25 and 2–18 in the Big East, including a first-round exit from the 2023 Big East tournament. On March 9, 2023, Ewing was fired as coach.

On July 4, 2026, Ewing was hired as assistant coach for the Washington Wizards, following a two year commitment as basketball ambassador and advisor for the Knicks which began in October 2024.

== Head coaching record ==
Record table
Season	Team	Overall	Conference	Standing	Postseason
Georgetown Hoyas (Big East Conference) (2017–2023)
2017–18	Georgetown	15–15	5–13	8th	
2018–19	Georgetown	19–14	9–9	T–3rd	NIT First Round
2019–20	Georgetown	15–17	5–13	T–8th	
2020–21	Georgetown	13–13	7–9	8th	NCAA Division I Round of 64
2021–22	Georgetown	6–25	0–19	11th	
2022–23	Georgetown	7–25	2–18	11th	
Georgetown:		75–109 (.408)	28–81 (.257)		
Total:		75–109 (.408)			
National champion Postseason invitational champion Conference regular season champion Conference regular season and conference tournament champion Division regular season champion Division regular season and conference tournament champion Conference tournament champion

== Other work ==
Ewing interned in the office of Senator Bob Dole during multiple summers in college.

Ewing was in the 1996 movie Space Jam as himself, one of five NBA players whose talent was stolen (along with Charles Barkley, Shawn Bradley, Larry Johnson, and Muggsy Bogues). Ewing had a brief appearance, again as himself, in the movie Senseless starring Marlon Wayans.

Ewing made cameos as himself in the sitcoms Spin City, Herman's Head, Mad About You, and Webster. Most recently, he appeared in a 2009 ad for Snickers, suggesting that those who eat the candy bar might "get dunked on by Patrick Chewing". He also made a silent cameo as the Angel of Death in The Exorcist III.

He co-wrote In the Paint, a painting how-to book for children.

In 2014, Ewing and sports agent David Falk announced a $3.3 million donation to the John R. Thompson, Jr. Intercollegiate Athletics Center under construction at Georgetown University. The amount is a reference to Ewing's number, 33.

== Endorsements ==
Ewing's first sneaker endorsement was with Adidas in 1986. In 1991, Next Sports signed a licensing deal to release footwear under Ewing's name in the United States under a new company, Ewing Athletics, which would operate until 1996. In 2012, David Goldberg and his company GPF Footwear LLC successfully teamed up with Ewing to resurrect the old Ewing Athletics line, and bring it back into stores, capitalizing on the current retro trend in the footwear market.

== Personal life ==
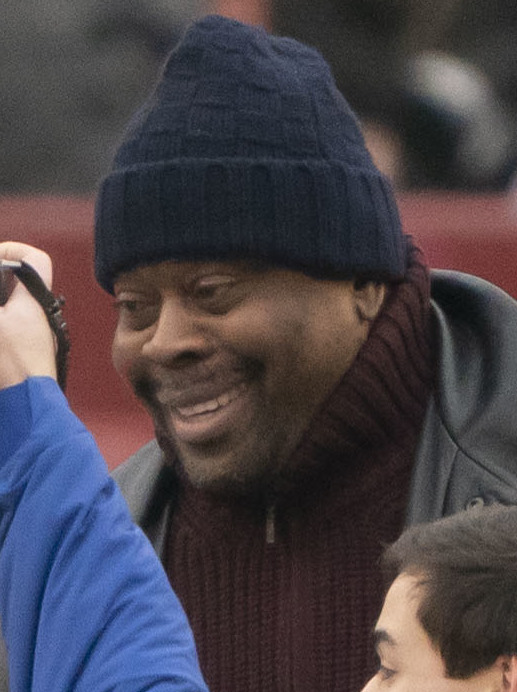
Ewing in 2018

Ewing was married to Rita Williams from 1990 to 1998. He has three children, including Patrick Ewing Jr. Each of his three children was born to a different woman.

In July 2001, Ewing testified in the federal trial of an Atlanta club owner charged with facilitating prostitution. Ewing told the court he received oral sex from dancers at the club in 1996 and 1997, but did not pay any money for the encounters and did not feel that he was involved in an act of prostitution. Ewing was never charged with a crime in connection with The Gold Club encounters.

After friend and rival NBA center Alonzo Mourning was diagnosed with a kidney ailment in 2000, Ewing promised that he would donate one of his kidneys to Mourning if he ever needed one. In 2003, Ewing was tested for kidney compatibility with Mourning, but Mourning's cousin was found to be the better match.

== See also ==
- Georgetown Hoyas men's basketball
- List of NBA career scoring leaders
- List of NBA franchise career scoring leaders
- List of NBA career rebounding leaders
- List of NBA career blocks leaders
- List of NBA career turnovers leaders
- List of NBA career personal fouls leaders
- List of NBA career free throw scoring leaders
- List of NBA career minutes played leaders
- List of NBA career playoff blocks leaders
- List of NBA single-season blocks per game leaders
- List of NCAA Division I men's basketball players with 2,000 points and 1,000 rebounds
