= Pauline =

Pauline may refer to:

== Religion ==
- An adjective referring to St Paul the Apostle or a follower of his doctrines
- An adjective referring to St Paul of Thebes, also called St Paul the First Hermit
- An adjective referring to the Paulines, various religious orders associated with these two saints, or a member of such an order
- Cappella Paolina, or Pauline Chapel, a chapel in the Vatican
- Pauline Christianity, the Christianity associated with the beliefs and doctrines espoused by St Paul the Apostle
- Pauline epistles, the thirteen or fourteen letters in the New Testament traditionally believed to have been written by St Paul the Apostle
- Pauline privilege, a form of dissolution of marriage

== People ==
- Pauline (given name), a female given name
- Pauline (singer) (born 1988), French singer (full name Pauline Vasseur)
- Pauline Kamusewu (born 1982), Swedish singer of Zimbabwean origin, also known as just Pauline
- The Countess (trans woman), a French transgender singer and courtesan in 19th-century Paris, also known as Pauline

== Places ==
- Pauline, Idaho, United States
- Pauline, Kansas, United States
- Pauline, South Carolina, United States
- Pauline, Texas, United States

== Films ==
- Pauline (Pavlinka), a 1974 film by Karel Kachyňa
- Pauline (2010 film), a 2010 film by Céline Sciamma
- Pauline (2026 film), a 2026 film by Anaïs Barbeau-Lavalette

== Other uses ==
- Hurricane Pauline, which devastated much of Mexico in 1997
- Pauline (Nintendo), fictional character in the Mario series of video games
- Pauline (Cowen opera) (1876), by Frederic Cowen
- Pauline (Stokes opera) (2014), by Tobin Stokes
- Pauline (novel), an 1839 novel by George Sand
- French frigate Pauline, launched in 1807
- USS Pauline (SP-658), a United States Navy patrol boat in commission from 1917 to 1919
- An adjective referring to St Paul's School, London or a pupil or former pupil of the school
- Pauline (crustacean), a fossil genus of ostracods from the Silurian
  - Pauline avibella, a fossil species
- Pauline Laws, the house laws of the Romanov rulers of Russia
- "Pauline", a 2024 song by the Zutons from The Big Decider

== See also ==
- Pauleen (disambiguation)
- Paulina (disambiguation)
- Paulin (disambiguation)
- Paulie (disambiguation)
- Paulinella, a genus of amoeboids
