= Pola (song) =

2019 song by Muniek Staszczyk

Single by Muniek Staszczyk

from the album Syn miasta
- Released: 3 June 2019
- Length: 3:53
- Label: Agora
- Songwriters: Dawid Podsiadło; Bartosz Dziedzic
- Producer: Bartosz Dziedzic

Muniek Staszczyk singles chronology
"Mietek" (2018)	"Pola" (2019)	"Krajobraz z wilgą i ludzie" (2019)

Music video
- "Pola" on YouTube

"Pola" is a Polish-language indie pop and rock single performed by Muniek Staszczyk. The lyrics were written by Dawid Podsiadło, and the music was composed and produced by Bartosz Dziedzic. The song was released as a single on 3 June 2019 by Agora label company, and later appeared on the Syn miasta album which was released on 18 November 2019. The titular "Pola" is an allegory to Poland and its political and social situation in the late 2010s. The song had reached first place on various charts in Poland and was awarded a platinum certification.

The music video of the song was written and directed by Katarzyna Sobczyk, with Agata Buzek performing the role of Pola.

== Charts ==
Chart (2019)	Peak position
Poland Airplay (ZPAV)	7

== Certifications ==
Region	Certification	Certified units/sales
Poland (ZPAV)	Platinum	20,000^{‡}
^{‡} Sales+streaming figures based on certification alone.
