= Hans Pauli =

Swedish monk; cunning folk (fl. 1570)

Hans Pauli (floruit 1570) was a Swedish Bridgettine monk and an alleged sorcerer, active as a professional exorcist and counter-magician.

Pauli had originally been a monk of the Bridgettine order in the convent of Vadstena Abbey. When the Swedish convents were closed in 1527, the nuns and monks, though formally allowed to stay as long as they did not admit any new members into the order, often left their old convents, especially the male members of the orders (the former nuns often stayed). The male section in the convent of Vadstena was dissolved in 1555. These monks were given a bad reputation because they traveled around people who still believed in old Catholic habits, teaching old Catholic prayers out among the people as spells. King Gustav Vasa complained about these traveling monks.

Hans Pauli had left his convent and spent five years in his old home country in Bergslagen, where he made himself a name by healing peoples' sicknesses by spells. He was also hired for exorcism and as a counter-magician of curses and black magic. In 1554, he was arrested and imprisoned in Hämeenlinna in Finland. He seem to have been released, however, as he was active as a magician in Sweden sixteen years later.

On one famous occasion in 1570, he was actually hired to lift the curse believed to have been put upon the silver mine in Sala in Berglagen. When the mine dried out temporarily one autumn, the bailiff wrote to the king with the explanation that the draft had been caused by unknown sorcerers, and Hans Pauli had been hired to perform white magic to counter the evil magic and lift the curse of the mine. Hans Pauli later described his actions and how he was hired himself:

"At the time of my residence on the copper mountain I found amongst old books a smaller book whose title was Consecratio majoris salis et aquae contra Daemoniacas infestatones ("great spell with salt and water against demonic obsessions"); I begun to use it over those who came under something evil, especially at night, when they left the royal mine. So it happened, when his Majesty's silver mine was damaged, that the bailiff asked me, if I knew a cure. I soon followed his wish and performed exorcism over everything around the foundries, and at once everything was back to normal."

Many of the women who were accused of sorcery during the great inspection-journey of the archbishop Abraham Angermannus in 1596–1597 claimed that they had learned their spells and their medical practices from wandering former monks such as Hans Pauli.

== Sources ==
- Åberg, Alf, Häxorna: de stora trolldomsprocesserna i Sverige 1668–1676, Esselte studium/Akademiförl., Göteborg, 1989 (in Swedish)
- Ankarloo, Bengt, Satans raseri: en sannfärdig berättelse om det stora häxoväsendet i Sverige och omgivande länder, Ordfront, Stockholm, 2007 (in Swedish)
