= Paula da Bancada Feminista =

Brazilian politician (born 1993)

- Paula in 2018

Member of the Legislative Assembly of São Paulo
- Incumbent
- Assumed office 15 March 2023

Personal details
- Born: 15 September 1993 (age 33)
- Party: Socialism and Liberty Party (since 2017)

Paula Nunes Dos Santos (born 15 September 1993), better known as Paula da Bancada Feminista, is a Brazilian politician serving as a member of the Legislative Assembly of São Paulo since 2023. From 2021 to 2023, she was a co-councillor of the Municipal Chamber of São Paulo.
