= Paulus Rundgren =

Finnish ice hockey player (born 1992)

- Born: 12 June 1992 (age 34) Kolari, Finland
- Height: 6 ft 0 in (183 cm)
- Weight: 183 lb (83 kg; 13 st 1 lb)
- Position: Forward/Defence
- Shoots: Left
- 3. Divisioona team; Former teams: Oulunkylän Kiekko-Kerho; Tappara
- Playing career: 2000–present

Paulus Rundgren (born 12 June 1992) is a Finnish ice hockey player who currently plays for Oulunkylän Kiekko-Kerho of the 3. Divisioona.

== Biography ==
Rundgren began his career with TPS, playing in their junior setup until 2010 when he moved to Tappara where he played two games for their senior side during the 2010–11 SM-liiga season. He moved to Jokerit in 2012 and captained their U20 side for the 2012–13 season but was unable to break into their main squad and was sent on loan to Mestis side Kiekko-Vantaa.

For his first full season of professional hockey, Rundgren signed with Mestis side TUTO Hockey in 2013. However, he struggled for form with the team and was released after just eighteen games with a goal and an assist to his name. He would also spend the season in Suomi-sarja with JHT and in Hockeyettan with Nittorps IK. After a second brief spell with JHT the following season, he moved to France with FFHG Division 1 side Bélougas de Toulouse-Blagnac. He spent the next two seasons with Remparts de Tours of Division 1 before joining Chamonix HC of the Ligue Magnus on 31 July 2017.
