= Paula Tooths =

British-Brazilian journalist and executive producer

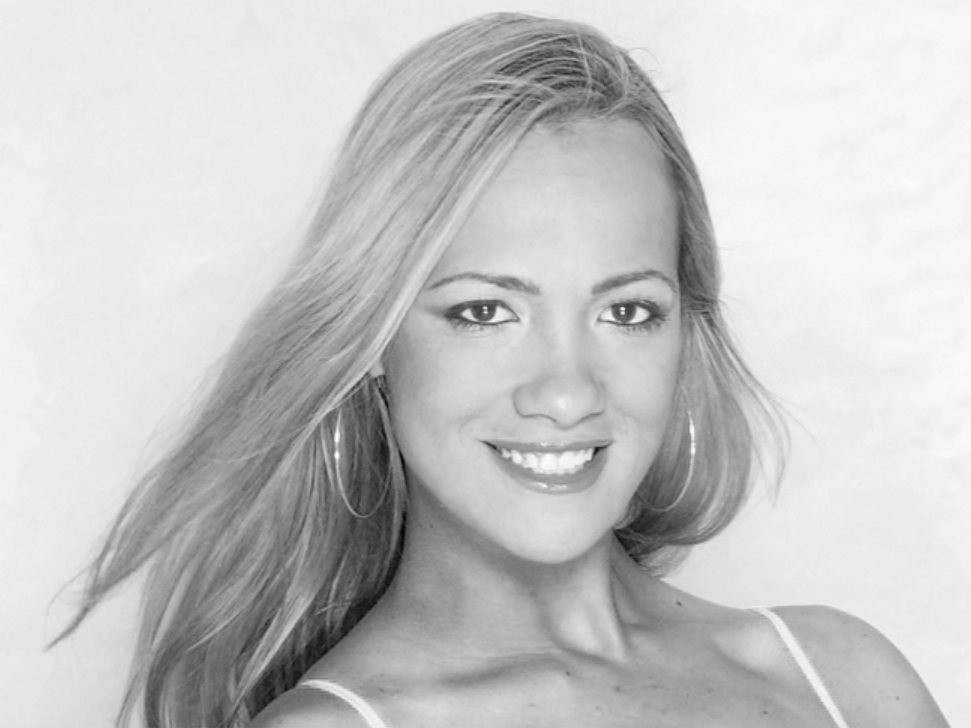
- Born: 31 January 1978 (age 48); São Paulo, Brazil
- Other name: Paz
- Years active: 1980–present
- Website: paulatooths.com

Paula Tooths (born 31 January 1978) also known as Paz, is a British-Brazilian journalist and executive producer from London, England.

== Early life ==
Tooths was born in São Paulo, Brazil, and moved to United Kingdom when she was still young. She attended Law University and also has a bachelor's degree in Information Technology.

== Career ==
Tooths' first media appearance was in 1980 at age three on a speech about sustainability. She started to work on media in 1998 for a TV station (Radio e Televisao Bandeirantes) in Brazil.

In December 2001, she moved to Australia and became an international correspondent with Bandnews TV. In 2003, she founded TOOTHS Communication, offering services in journalism, executive production and voice over. She covered the Olympics, World Cup, presidential elections, presidential debates, Miss Brazil beauty contest and worked as a journalist and producer. She signed an executive production on Brazilian carnival events in Rio de Janeiro and Salvador for four years and was executive producer on the realization of the concert of Red Hot Chili Peppers in Rio de Janeiro in 2002.

Tooths was a regular collaborator on the “Blog do PP,’ writing about English football, in particular the Premier League. She wrote a column called ‘’Tooths a ver” on the site ‘Mandando pra Rede’., where she mostly wrote about sports. She wrote about other general subjects in her column called ‘Era uma Vez’ for many years on the now extinct newspaper, A Hora.

Tooths had her international articles printed for the first time on the front page in 2006, and 2007 on A Hora (Goiania, Brazil). In 2012, she was invited to Lisbon Radio to lead the comments of the Champions League final (Chelsea vs Bayern).

In 2012, she signed the edition of a fiction book for teens, Green Snake 9: volume 1, which is available in over twenty countries. In 2013, she published her first book in the United Kingdom – Eunoia and later that same year, Mandala Coach Therapy. The full version comes with a deck of divination cards and there is also a black-and-white limited-edition version.

In December 2014, Tooths published Be Fit & Fab, book which is a narrative on how she lost 30 kilos and got in shape in her late 30s by working on a daily basis. In 2015, she had a massive coach project realized, Be unstoppable – Get Anything You Want, and published a book with the same name. Tooths is also an ambassador for Maxflow Sports since 2013.
