= Pola (given name) =

- Gender: Female

Origin
- Origin: Greek
- Region of origin: Greece

Other names
- Related names: Apollo, Apollinaris, Apollonia, Polina

Pola is a feminine given name of Greek origin, a Polish and Spanish form of the name Apolonia, a feminine form of the ancient Greek name Apollinaris, a name derived from the Greek god Apollo. Saint Apollonia was an early Christian martyr venerated in the Catholic Church and the patron saint of dentists and those battling problems with their teeth. The name is currently well-used for girls in Poland.
