= Paula Titan =

Brazilian politician (born 1990)

Member of the Legislative Assembly of Pará
- Incumbent
- Assumed office 1 February 2023

Personal details
- Born: 30 May 1990 (age 35)
- Party: Brazilian Democratic Movement (since 2014)
- Parent: Paulo Titan (father)

Paula Cristina Titan Rebello (born 30 May 1990) is a Brazilian politician serving as a member of the Legislative Assembly of Pará since 2023. She is the daughter of Paulo Titan.
