= Pavlína Štefková =

Slovak volleyball player (born 1943)

Personal information
- Nationality: Slovak
- Born: 27 January 1943 (age 82); Bratislava, Czechoslovakia

Sport
- Sport: Volleyball

Pavlína Štefková (born 27 January 1943) is a Slovak volleyball player. She competed in the women's tournament at the 1968 Summer Olympics.
