= Paula Prata =

Brazilian politician (born 1999)

Member of the Legislative Assembly of Maranhão
- Incumbent
- Assumed office 1 February 2027

Personal details
- Born: 24 January 1999 (age 27)
- Party: Social Democratic Party

Paula Prata Almeida de Carvalho (born 24 January 1999) is a Brazilian politician who was elected member of the Legislative Assembly of Maranhão in 2026. She previously served as secretary of women of Santa Inês.
