= Ewing Athletics =

American basketball shoe brand

- Type: Privately held company
- Industry: shoe company
- Founded: 2011
- Founder: Patrick Ewing; David Falk
- Headquarters: Englewood, New Jersey
- Key people: David Goldberg
- Products: shoes
- Website: shop.ewingathletics.com

Ewing Athletics is an American basketball shoe brand. Shoe production is done by privately held company GPF Footwear LLC established in 2011.

Its headquarters are located in Englewood, New Jersey.

== Early history ==
Ewing Athletics is retired professional basketball player Patrick Ewing's signature basketball shoe brand. After Ewing parted ways with adidas, his first shoe endorser, he and his agent David Falk sought to create their own brand. The brand was founded in 1988 with shoe executive of Roberto Muller of Phoenix Integrated, then was sublicensed to Next Sports for them to distribute in 1991. The brand grew rapidly, as it was worn on court by Ewing as he was a perennial NBA All-Star, and worn in music videos and performances by artists such as Tupac Shakur, Gang Starr, Kriss Kross and more. The brand's most popular model, the 33 HI was even worn by Joe Pesci in the movie My Cousin Vinny for most of the film. The brand soon expanded from just basketball shoes into apparel and full family kids sizes as well as revenue hit $40M per year in the early to mid 1990s. Soon, however, due to distribution problems with Next Sports, Ewing Athletics filed a lawsuit against them that would effectively close the brand in 1996. Ewing would go on to wear Nike for the rest of his career in the NBA and Ewing Athletics would disappear for over 15 years.

== Brand resurgence ==
Over the years a cult following grew for collectors looking for information about the old Ewing Athletics shoes. In 2012 David Goldberg and his company GPF Footwear LLC partnered up with Ewing and David Falk to reintroduce the brand back into the marketplace, hoping to capitalize on the retro footwear trend, starting with the original 33 HI. The initial launch was in August 2012 with the shoes available at select New York City stores only, with Ewing himself showing up to surprise fans waiting in lines to purchase the shoes. The relaunch was received positively into the fickle sneaker market and the company has gone on to reintroduce other models as well including: Focus, Guard, Center, Wrap, Rogue, Concept and 33 LO. They have produced T-shirts, hats and participated in a special project with New York rappers Fabolous and Teyana Taylor in conjunction with Teaneck, New Jersey based sneaker store Packer Shoes. The NYC launch of the shoes, with the artists present to meet and greet fans, was a big success, with lines around the block and the shoes selling out in two hours. Over the last few years the brand has grown quickly again, reminiscent of its glory days and is now distributed worldwide in over 30 countries.

In December 2023, Ewing Athletics partnered with Yandel, a Latin singer, to create a sneaker.
