= Ilkka Sinisalo =

Finnish ice hockey player (1958–2017)

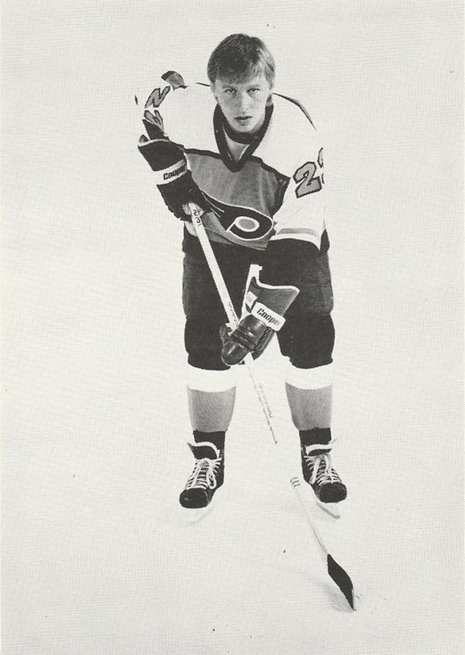
- Sinisalo in 1983 photo
- Born: July 10, 1958 Valkeakoski, Finland
- Died: April 5, 2017 (aged 58) Helsinki, Finland
- Height: 6 ft 0 in (183 cm)
- Weight: 190 lb (86 kg; 13 st 8 lb)
- Position: Right wing
- Shot: Left
- Played for: NHL; Philadelphia Flyers; Minnesota North Stars; Los Angeles Kings; SM-liiga; HIFK; HPK; Ilves; Kiekko-Espoo
- National team: Finland
- NHL draft: Undrafted
- Playing career: 1978–1996

Ilkka Antero Jouko Sinisalo (July 10, 1958 – April 5, 2017) was a Finnish professional ice hockey forward who played eleven seasons in the National Hockey League (NHL) for the Philadelphia Flyers, Minnesota North Stars and Los Angeles Kings. Later he was a scout for the Flyers.

== Playing career ==
Sinisalo was originally a junior product of HIFK. He played in the NHL from 1981 to 1992, scoring 204 goals and 426 points, mostly with the Flyers. Sinisalo is ranked as the all-time leading goal scorer among European Philadelphia Flyers. He is also ranked the fourth-highest Finnish goal scorer in NHL history, and he was honored by induction to the Finnish Hockey Hall of Fame in 1997.

When Sinisalo started his ice hockey career in the 1970s, NHL teams did not scout extensively in Finland. The first Finnish ice hockey player in NHL was Matti Hagman for the 1976–77 Boston Bruins. However, NHL scouts were so impressed by Sinisalo's talents that they made an exception by signing him as a free agent after his 1980–81 season with HIFK, where he scored 27 goals in 36 games. He signed his first NHL contract on February 17, 1981. Sinisalo started his first season with the Flyers with his first NHL goal against the Pittsburgh Penguins. Sinisalo became the first Flyer to score his first NHL goal on a penalty shot, and the third NHL player at that time. During the 1984–85 season, Sinisalo scored 73 points in 70 games, with a +32 rating. The 1989–90 season was Sinisalo's last with the Flyers, after which he played one season for the Minnesota North Stars and two seasons for the Los Angeles Kings.

Sinisalo retired from hockey in 1996, last playing for the Kiekko-Espoo in the SM-Liiga.

== Career after retirement ==
After playing his last season of professional ice hockey for Kiekko-Espoo in 1995–96 in Finland, Sinisalo took a job as the general manager of the club. He served as Kiekko-Espoo GM until 1998–99. Sinisalo was then hired by San Jose Sharks general manager Dean Lombardi on September 12, 1998, as a European-based scout for the Sharks. In July 2004, he returned to the Flyers' organization as their European scout.

== Personal life ==
Sinisalo's son Tomas is a professional ice hockey player, primarily in Finland, having attended the Flyers' training camp in 2009.

Sinisalo died as a result of prostate cancer on April 5, 2017.

== Career statistics ==
=== Regular season and playoffs ===
			Regular season					Playoffs
Season	Team	League	GP	G	A	Pts	PIM	GP	G	A	Pts	PIM
1976–77	PiTa	FIN II	35	22	16	38	8	—	—	—	—	—
1977–78	HIFK	SM-l	36	9	3	12	18	—	—	—	—	—
1978–79	HIFK	SM-l	30	6	4	10	16	6	4	1	5	2
1979–80	HIFK	SM-l	35	16	9	25	16	7	1	3	4	4
1980–81	HIFK	SM-l	36	27	17	44	14	6	5	3	8	4
1981–82	Philadelphia Flyers	NHL	66	15	22	37	22	4	0	2	2	0
1982–83	Philadelphia Flyers	NHL	61	21	29	50	16	3	1	1	2	0
1983–84	Philadelphia Flyers	NHL	73	29	17	46	29	2	2	0	2	0
1984–85	Philadelphia Flyers	NHL	70	36	37	73	16	19	6	1	7	0
1985–86	Philadelphia Flyers	NHL	74	39	37	76	31	5	2	2	4	2
1986–87	Philadelphia Flyers	NHL	42	10	21	31	8	18	5	1	6	4
1987–88	Philadelphia Flyers	NHL	68	25	17	42	30	7	4	2	6	0
1988–89	Philadelphia Flyers	NHL	13	1	6	7	2	8	1	1	2	0
1989–90	Philadelphia Flyers	NHL	59	23	23	46	26	—	—	—	—	—
1990–91	Minnesota North Stars	NHL	46	5	12	17	24	—	—	—	—	—
1990–91	Los Angeles Kings	NHL	7	0	0	0	2	2	0	1	1	0
1991–92	Los Angeles Kings	NHL	3	0	1	1	2	—	—	—	—	—
1991–92	Phoenix Roadrunners	IHL	42	19	21	40	32	—	—	—	—	—
1992–93	HPK	SM-l	46	13	16	29	55	12	2	3	5	8
1993–94	Kärpät	FIN II	28	27	15	42	20	—	—	—	—	—
1993–94	Ilves	SM-l	12	1	6	7	10	4	1	0	1	6
1994–95	Ilves	SM-l	30	2	7	9	45	—	—	—	—	—
1994–95	Kiekko-Espoo	SM-l	16	7	7	14	6	4	0	3	3	4
1995–96	Kiekko-Espoo	SM-l	44	7	12	19	36	—	—	—	—	—
SM-l totals			285	88	81	169	216	39	13	13	26	28
NHL totals			582	204	222	426	208	68	21	11	32	6

=== International ===
Year	Team	Event	GP	G	A	Pts	PIM
1978	Finland	WJC	6	1	7	8	4
1981	Finland	WC	5	0	1	1	4
1981	Finland	CC	5	1	0	1	6
1982	Finland	WC	5	1	1	2	6
1983	Finland	WC	8	0	2	2	4
Senior totals			23	2	4	6	20
