= Payola (disambiguation) =

Payola is a legal term for a payment or fund.

Payola may also refer to:

- Payolas, a Canadian rock band
- Payola (New Zealand band)
- Payola (Northern Irish band)
- Payola (The Cribs album), 2013
- Payola (Desaparecidos album), 2015
