= Sthéfanie Tiele Martins Paulino =

Brazilian volleyball player (born 1993)

Sthefanie Tiele

Personal information
- Full name: Sthefanie Tiele Martins Paulino
- Nationality: Brazilian
- Born: 4 March 1993 (age 33)
- Height: 191 cm (75 in)
- Weight: 75 kg (165 lb)
- Spike: 307 cm (121 in)
- Block: 300 cm (118 in)

Volleyball information
- Number: 6 (national team)

National team
2010	Brazil

Sthefanie Tiele Martins Paulino (born 4 March 1993) is a Brazilian retired volleyball player.

She was part of the Brazil women's national volleyball team.

She participated in the 2010 Women's Pan-American Volleyball Cup.
