= Paulie Gee =

American restaurateur

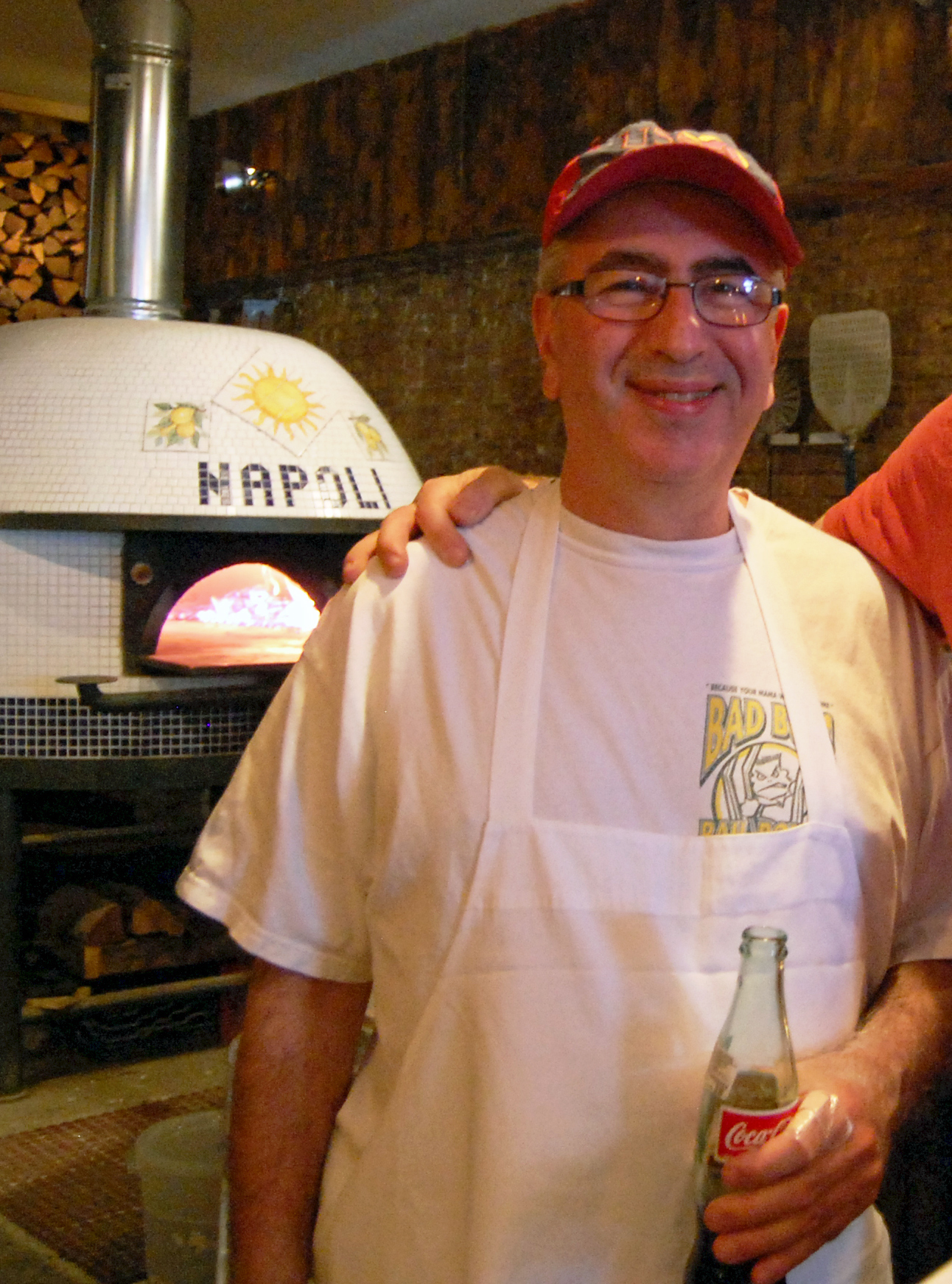
- Giannone in 2010
- Occupation: Restaurateur
- Years active: 2010–present
- Known for: Paulie Gee's

Paul Giannone, known as Paulie Gee, is an American restaurateur who founded the eponymous Paulie Gee's pizzeria in Greenpoint, Brooklyn, New York.

== Early life ==
Giannone was born in the Kensington section of Brooklyn. He is of Italian and Jewish descent.

== Career ==
Prior to opening Paulie Gee's, Giannone had a career in information technology, working for various telecommunications corporations and later as a consultant. Disillusioned with his career, he built a pizza oven in his backyard and developed a following in the online pizza community.

Giannone opened Paulie Gee's pizzeria in Greenpoint, Brooklyn in March 2010, known for its eclectic topping combinations and rustic dining experience. The "Hellboy" pizza with soppressata and Mike's Hot Honey quickly became a specialty at the restaurant.

Paulie Gee's has since opened and licensed additional locations across the United States in Columbus, Baltimore, Chicago, and New Orleans. The business also opened a Paulie Gee's pizza kiosk in Madison Square Garden in Manhattan.

Giannone has made a variety of media and public speaking appearances since opening Paulie Gee's, often noted for his career change late in life.

Media / Public Speaking Appearances
TODAY (interview with Jane Pauley)
Katie (interview with Jane Pauley)
Travel Channel Food Paradise
Food Network Crave
The Chew
Second Act - Vice Media and Mailchimp Presents
Vice Video - Chef's Night Out
Pizza Today
