= Paulina of Rome =

Saint Paulina of Rome
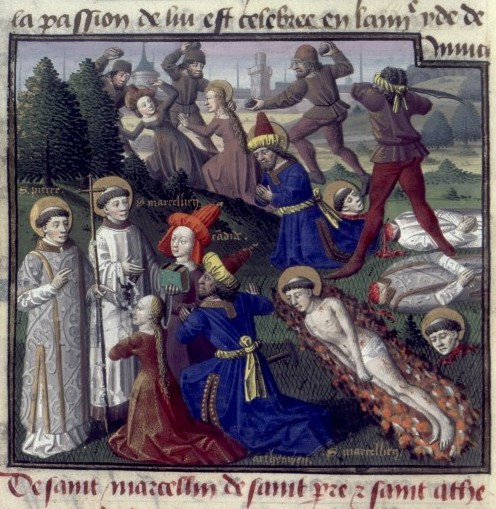
- Artemius, Candida, and Paulina in front of Saints Marcellinus and Peter, illustration from Speculum Maius (15th century).
- Died: Died in 302; Buried alive under a pile of stones
- Feast: 6 June

Saint Paulina (died c. 302) was a Roman martyr. Her feast day is celebrated on June 6.

Saint Paulina was the daughter of Saints Artemius and Candida of Rome. She was converted to Christianity by Saint Peter the Exorcist and baptized by Saint Marcellinus. According to tradition, she was martyred by being buried alive under a pile of stones.

In 1622 Pope Gregory XV donated remains attributed to her to Jesuit Mutio Vitelleschi. In 1623 his subordinate Mikołaj Łęczycki transported the remains to the town of Olomouc which was hit by Plague pandemic. Archbishop Franz von Dietrichstein named Paulina patron saint of the city and local archdiocese.
