= Marcellinus and Peter =

4th-century Christian martyrs

Saints Marcellinus and Peter
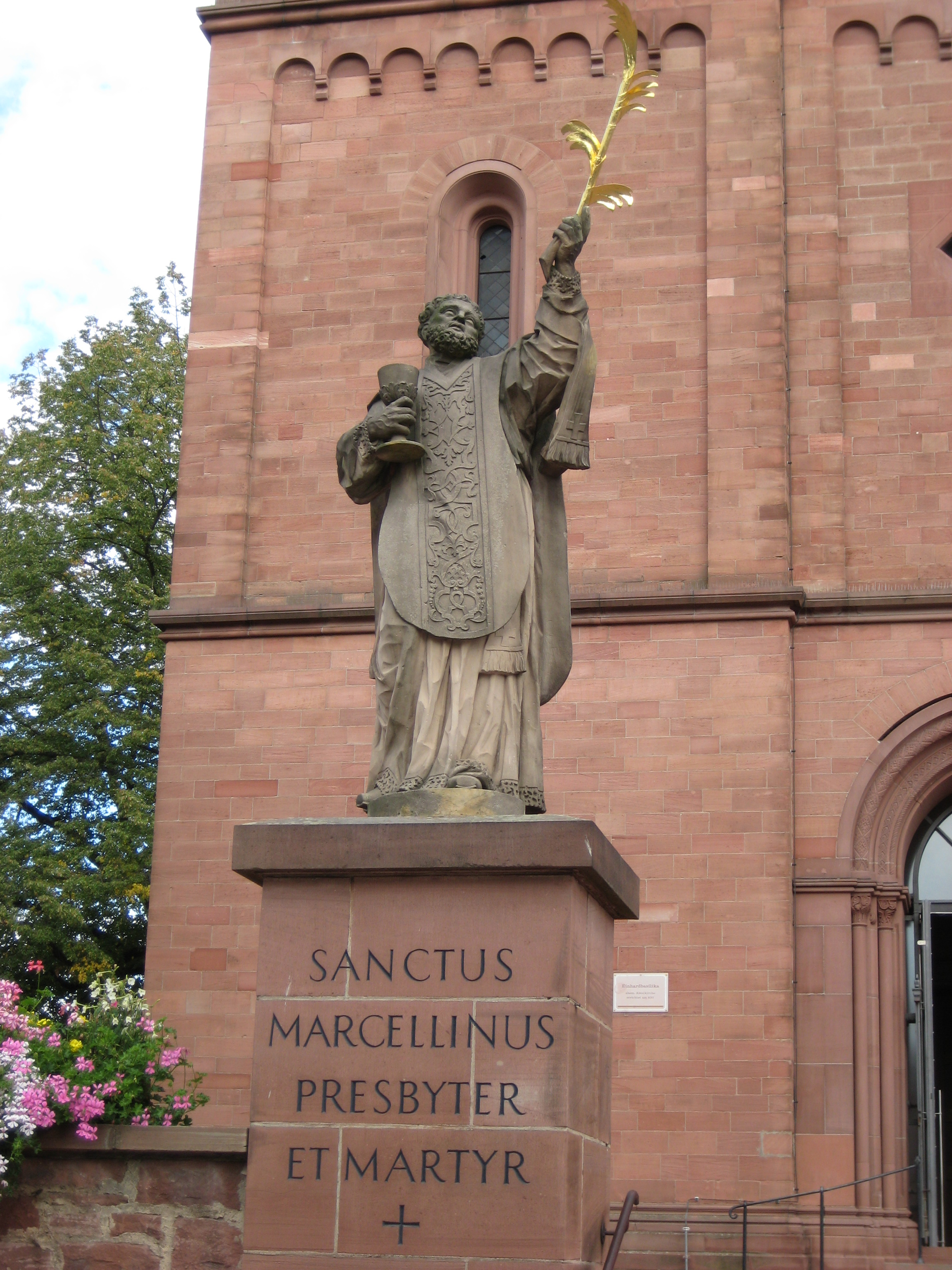
- Statue of St. Marcellinus at Seligenstadt.

Martyrs
- Died: ~304 AD; Rome
- Venerated in: Catholic Church Eastern Orthodox Church Oriental Orthodox Church
- Major shrine: Santi Marcellino e Pietro al Laterano, Rome; Seligenstadt, Germany; relics also claimed by cathedral of Cremona
- Feast: 2 June
- Attributes: Depicted as two tonsured men holding crowns; palms of martyrdom; depicted alongside St. Pollio

Saints Marcellinus and Peter (sometimes called Petrus Exorcista – Peter the Exorcist; Italian: Marcellino e Pietro) are venerated within the Catholic Church as martyrs who were beheaded. Hagiographies place them in 4th century Rome. They are generally represented as men in middle age, with tonsures and palms of martyrdom; sometimes they hold a crown each.

== Hagiography ==
Little is known about the actual lives of these two men. Later hagiography suggests that Marcellinus, a priest, and Peter, an exorcist, died in the year 304, during the Diocletianic Persecution. Pope Damasus I claimed that he heard the story of these two martyrs from their executioner who went on to become a Christian. Damasus states that they were killed by the magistrate Severus or Serenus, at an out-of-the-way spot so that other Christians would not have a chance to bury and venerate their bodies. The two saints happily cleared the spot chosen for their death: a thicket overgrown with thorns, brambles, and briers three miles from Rome. They were beheaded and buried in that spot.

Two women, Lucilla and Firmina, assisted by divine revelation, found the bodies, however, and had them properly buried. They buried their bodies near the body of St. Tiburtius on the Via Labicana in what became known as the Catacombs of Marcellinus and Peter. Alban Butler writes that "it was thought at one time that forty-four other martyrs died with Marcellinus and Peter, but this is due to a misreading of the Hieronymianum."

Around the 6th century, a passio connected the martyrdom of Marcellinus and Peter with that of the jailer Artemius, who was converted to Christianity by Marcellinus. Artemius' wife Secunda (or Candida) and daughter Paulina were also converted. Artemius was beheaded; Secunda and Paulina were buried alive under a pile of stones. The passio states that they were killed at the 12th milestone on the Via Aurelia in a place called Silva Candida ("Whitewood", also called Silva Nigra, "Blackwood", or at Lorium). Their executioner, Dorotheus, was said to have been converted by Pope Julius I.

== Veneration ==
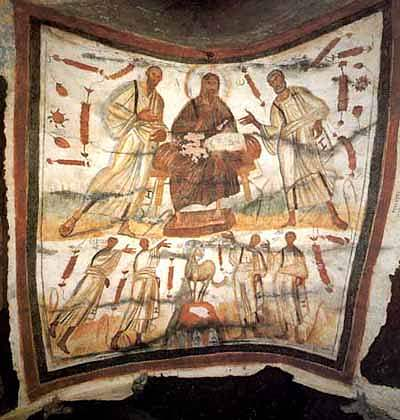
Wall painting (4th century) from the catacomb of Marcellinus and Peter on the Via Labicana, showing Christ between Peter and Paul, and below them the martyrs Gorgonius, Peter, Marcellinus, and Tiburtius

Pope Damasus, who opened their catacombs, also remarks that he wrote a Latin epitaph with the details of their death with which he adorned their tomb.

The martyrs were venerated by Christians in the centuries after their martyrdom. Their sepulcher is mentioned in the Martyrologium Hieronymianum, which includes the information that Marcellinus was a priest and that Peter was an exorcist. In the Martyrologium, their feast day is given as 2 June and their sepulcher is described as being located ad duas lauros ("at the two laurel trees") at the third mile of the Via Labicana. From the 7th century onwards, their sepulcher became a site of pilgrimage, and their feast day is recorded in local liturgies and hagiographies. According to the Liber Pontificalis, Constantine the Great built a basilica in their honor, since a structure built by Damasus had been destroyed by the Goths.

The names of Sts. Marcellinus and Peter appeared in the Ambrosian liturgy. Their names are also mentioned in the Roman Canon.

In 1253 Pope Alexander IV translated their relics to an ancient church (its presence was first mentioned in 595 AD) near the present-day Via Merulana that was named after them: Santi Marcellino e Pietro. The altarpiece, by Gaetano Lapis depicts the Martyrdom of Saint Peter and Saint Marcellino (1751).

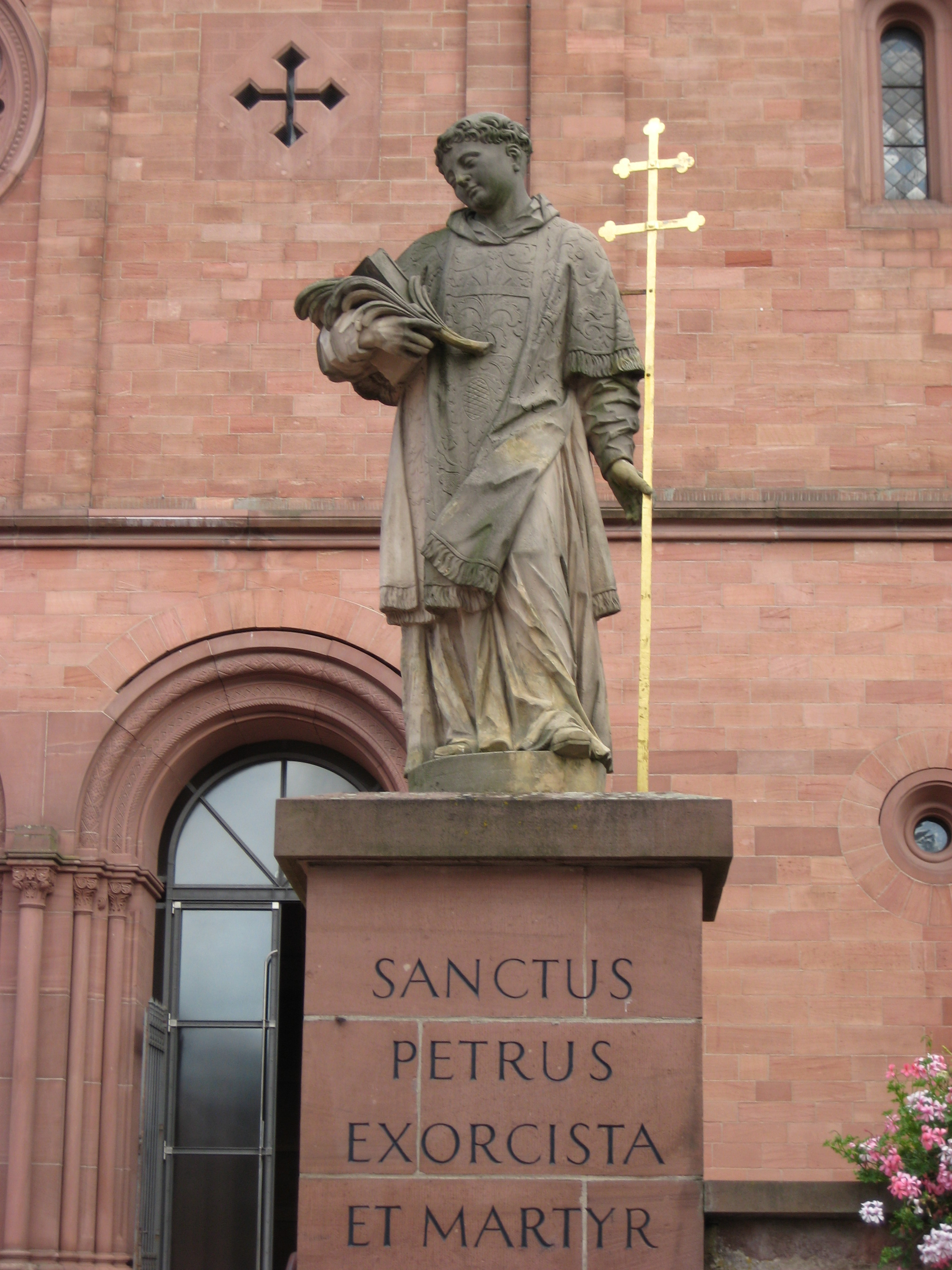
Statue of Peter at Seligenstadt

Relics associated with Marcellinus and Peter were translated to Seligenstadt in Germany in the 9th century. They were sent by Pope Gregory IV to Einhard, secretary to Charlemagne. Einhard translated the relics to Strasburg, and then to Michlenstad; and afterwards to Malinheim or Mulinheim (later called Seligenstadt). In 829, Einhard built a church in honor of Marcellinus and Peter, and became its first abbot. Sigebert, Aimoin, and Rabanus Maurus all mention this translation.

A slightly different account states that Einhard had built a basilica at Michelstadt in 827 and then sent a servant, Ratleic, to Rome with an end to find relics for the new building. Once in Rome, Ratleic, with the help of Deusdona, a Roman deacon with a reputation as a relics-swindler and thief, robbed a catacomb of the bones of Marcellinus and Peter and had them translated to Michelstadt. Once there, the relics made it known they were unhappy with their new tomb and thus had to be moved again to Mulinheim (now Seligenstadt). Once established there, they proved to be miracle workers. Agostino Amore believes that the entire translation was fraudulent, due to Deusdona's reputation.

Cremona Cathedral in Italy also claims to have relics of the two saints, inside a sarcophagus in one of its transepts.

== Iconography ==
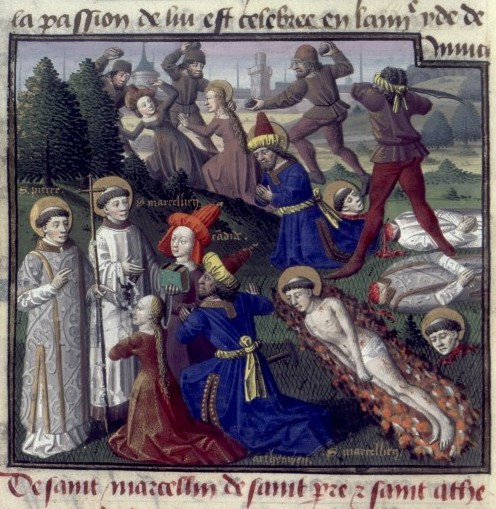
Artemius, Candida, and Paulina in front of Saints Marcellinus and Peter, illustration from Speculum Maius (15th century)

They are generally represented as men in middle age, with tonsures and palms of martyrdom; sometimes they hold a crown each. In the catacombs named after them, a fresco dating from the 4th or 5th centuries, represents them without aureolae, with short beards, next to the Lamb of Christ. In another fresco from the 5th or 6th centuries, in the catacombs of Pontian, they are beardless and depicted alongside Saint Pollio.

There is a church dedicated to them at Imbersago.
