= Polona (given name) =

Female given name

Polona is a feminine given name.

== Notable people with this name ==
- Polona Barič (born 1992), Slovenian handballer
- Polona Batagelj (born 1989), Slovenian road bicycle racer
- Polona Dornik (born 1962), Yugoslav Slovenian basketball player
- Polona Frelih (born 1970), Slovenian table tennis player
- Polona Hercog (born 1991), Slovenian tennis player
- Polona Juh (born 1971), Slovenian actress
- Polona Klemenčič (born 1997), Slovenian biathlete
- Polona Reberšak (born 1987), Slovenian tennis player
- Polona Zupan (born 1976), Slovenian snowboarder
