= Oulunkylän Kiekko-Kerho =

Logo

Oulunkylän Kiekko-Kerho (abbreviated OKK) is a Finnish ice hockey team based at Malmin jäähalli (capacity 650), Helsinki. The team was established in 1973.
