= Pavla =

Pavla is the Czech form of the given name Paula. Pavla may refer to:

- Pavla Brantalova (born 1977), female bodybuilder born in the Czech Republic
- Pavla Chrástová (born 1979), retired female medley swimmer from the Czech Republic
- Pavla Hamáčková-Rybová (born 1978), Czech athlete and Olympic pole vaulter
- Pavla Havlíková (born 1983), Czech professional racing cyclist
- Pavla Hočevar (1889–1972), Slovene teacher, writer, socialist and suffragist
- Pavla Jerina Lah (1915–2007), Slovene surgeon and partisan
- Pavla Topolánková (born 1955), Czech politician
- Pavla Vykopalová (born 1972), Czech opera singer
