= Pauline (given name) =

- Gender: female

Origin
- Origin: French
- Meaning: little

Other names
- Related names: Paulina

Pauline is a female given name. It was originally the French form of Paulina, a female version of Paulinus, a variant of Paulus meaning the little, hence the younger.

The corresponding form for the name in Italian is Paolina (Paula corresponds to Paola). In Russian, the corresponding names are Павли́на (pronounced Pavlína) and Поли́на (pronounced poleenah). A Finnish form of the name is Pauliina; in Greece it is Παυλίνα (Pavlina), (Paulina, pronounced Pavleena or Paulina, Poleena). In French, other diminutives of Paula exist, namely Paulette and Pauletta.

== People ==
- Pauline Adams (1874–1958), Irish-American suffragist
- Pauline Ado (b. 1991), French professional surfer
- Pauline Alderman (1893–1983), US musicologist and composer
- Pauline Allen (b. 1948), Australian scholar of early Christianity
- Pauline Amelinckx (b. 1995), Filipina model
- Pauline Amos, British performance artist
- Pauline Antoine-Prospere, Saint Lucian politician
- Pauline Armitage, Northern Ireland politician
- Pauline Ashwell, pseudonym of British author Pauline Whitby (1928–2015)
- Pauline Astier (b. 2002), French basketball player
- Pauline Auzou (1775–1835), French painter
- Pauline Morrow Austin (1916–2011), US meteorologist
- Pauline Baards, a stage name of Italian actor Paola Barbara (1912–1989)
- Pauline Gardiner Barber, Canadian social anthropologist
- Pauline Bart (1930–2021), American sociologist
- Pauline Irene Batebe, Ugandan engineer
- Pauline Baynes (1922–2008), English illustrator
- Pauline Bebe (b. 1965), French rabbi
- Pauline Bell (1912–2010), winner of the second Scripps National Spelling Bee champion
- Pauline Benda (1877–1985), French actress better known as Simone Le Bargy
- Pauline Bennett (b. 1964), British DJ and rapper also known as Jazzi P
- Pauline Bern (b. 1952), New Zealand jeweller
- Pauline Betz (1919–2011), US professional tennis player
- Pauline Bewick (1935–2022), Irish artist
- Pauline Bird-Hart (b. 1957), British rower
- Pauline Biscarat (b. 1989), French rugby sevens player
- Pauline Black (b. 1953), English singer
- Pauline Bøgelund (b. 1996), Danish handball player
- Pauline Bonaparte (1780–1825), Italian noble
- Pauline Boty (1938–1966), British painter
- Pauline Boutal (1894–1992), French-born Canadian artist, theatrical designer, actress and educator
- Pauline Bremer (b. 1996), German footballer
- Pauline Browes (b. 1938), Canadian politician
- Pauline Burbidge (b. 1950), British textile artist, designer, and quiltmaker
- Pauline Powell Burns (1872–1912), African-American artist
- Pauline Cafferkey, Scottish nurse
- Pauline Cassin Caro (1828/34/35–1901), French novelist
- Pauline Chalamet (b. 1992), American actress, writer, and director
- Pauline Chan Bo-Lin (1973–2002), Hong Kong actress
- Pauline Clare (born 1947), British former police officer
- Pauline Clarke (1921–2013), English author
- Pauline Atherton Cochrane (1929–2024), American librarian
- Pauline Collins (1940–2025), English actress
- Pauline Cope (b. 1969), English footballer
- Pauline Marie Armande Craven (1808–1891), French author
- Pauline Smith Crenshaw (1878–1956), American historian and socialite
- Pauline Croze (b. 1979), French singer and musician
- Pauline Curley (1903–2000), American actress
- Pauline Curnier Jardin (b. 1980), French visual artist
- Pauline Cushman (1833–1893), US actress and spy
- Pauline Davis (politician) (1917–1995), US politician
- Pauline Davis-Thompson (b. 1966), Bahamian sprinter
- Pauline de Ahna (1863–1950), German singer
- Pauline de Lézardière (1754–1835), French historian
- Pauline de Meulan (1773–1827), French writer
- Pauline de Rothschild (1908–1976), writer and fashion designer
- Pauline de Talleyrand-Périgord (1820–1890), French noble
- Pauline Déroulède (born 1990), French wheelchair tennis player
- Pauline Donalda (1882–1970), Canadian singer
- Pauline Ducruet (b. 1994), Monegasque noble
- Pauline Dunwell Partridge (1879–1944), American writer
- Dame Pauline Engel (1930–2017), New Zealand educator and Catholic nun
- Pauline Fisk (1948–2015), British children's author
- Pauline Flanagan (1925–2003), Irish actress
- Pauline Fréchette (1889–1943), poet, dramatist, journalist, nun
- Pauline Frederick (1883–1938), US actor
- Pauline Frost, Canadian politician
- Pauline Gardiner (b. 1947), New Zealand politician
- Pauline Garon (1900–1965), US actor
- Pauline Gedge (b. 1945), Canadian novelist
- Pauline Green (b. 1948), European politician
- Pauline Gregg (1909–2006), British historian
- Pauline Hanson (b. 1954), Australian politician
- Pauline Heßler (b. 1998), German ski jumper
- Pauline Holdstock (b. 1948), British-Canadian writer
- Pauline Hopkins (1859–1930), African-American novelist
- Pauline von Hügel (1858–1901), Italian-born Austrian baroness; British writer, philanthropist
- Pauline Jacobus (1840–1930), US studio potter
- Pauline-Marie Jaricot (1799–1862), French founder of the Society of the Propagation of the Faith and the Living Rosary Association.
- Pauline Jewett (1922–1992), Canadian politician
- E. Pauline Johnson (1861–1913), Canadian writer and performer
- Pauline Johnson (actress) (1899–1947), English film actor
- Pauline Julien (1928–1998), Canadian singer
- Pauline Kael (1919–2001), US film critic
- Pauline Njeri Kahenya (born 1985), Kenyan long-distance runner
- Pauline Koner (1912–2001), US dancer and choreographer
- Pauline Konga (b. 1970), Kenyan runner
- Pauline Kingi (b. 1951), Māori community leader
- Pauline LaFon Gore (1912–2004), mother of former US Vice President Al Gore and the wife of former US Senator Albert Gore Sr.
- Pauline Lafont (1963–1988), French actor
- Pauline Lecarpentier (b. 1997), French freestyle wrestler
- Pauline Lefèvre-Utile (1830–1922) founded the LU (biscuits) company in 1854.
- Pauline Love (born 1987), American basketball player and coach
- Pauline Macabies (born 1986), French biathlete
- Pauline Arnoux MacArthur (1867–1941), American clubwoman and writer
- Pauline Gracia Beery Mack (1891–1974), US chemist
- Pauline Maier (1938–2013), US historian
- Pauline Mailhac (1858–1946), Austrian-German opera singer
- Pauline Félicité de Mailly (1712–1741), French noble
- Pauline Marois (b. 1949), Canadian politician
- Pauline Mills McGibbon (1910–2001), Canadian politician
- Pauline McLynn (b. 1962), Irish actor
- Pauline McNeill (b. 1962) Scottish politician
- Pauline Melville (b. 1948), Guyanese-born writer and actor
- Pauline Menczer (b. 1970), Australian surfer
- Pauline Mendoza (b. 1999), Filipina actress and model
- Pauline von Metternich (1836–1921), Austrian socialite
- Anna Milder-Hauptmann (1785–1838), Austrian singer
- Pauline Moran (b. 1947), English actor
- Pauline Musters (1876–1895), the shortest woman ever recorded
- Pauline Ngan Po-ling, Chinese politician
- Pauline Neville-Jones, Baroness Neville-Jones (b. 1939), BBC Governor and Chairman of the British Joint Intelligence Committee
- Pauline Newstone (1943–2023), Canadian voice actor
- Pauline Nyiramasuhuko (b. 1946), Rwandan politician and war criminal
- Pauline Oliveros (1932–2016), US composer and accordionist
- Pauline O'Neill (disambiguation)
  - Pauline O'Neill (sister), first president of Saint Mary's College in Notre Dame, Indiana
  - Pauline O'Neill (suffrage leader) (1865–1961), suffrage leader, Arizona state legislator, and widow of Buckey O'Neill
- Princess Pauline of Orange-Nassau (1800–1806), Dutch noble
- Pauline Pantsdown, stage name of Australian satirist Simon Hunt
- Pauline Parker (b. 1938), New Zealander murderer
- Pauline Parmentier (b. 1986), French tennis player
- Pauline-Euphrosine Paul (1803–1877), French ballet dancer also known as Madame Montessu
- Pauline Pearce, British activist
- Pauline Periwinkle (1863–1916), American journalist, poet, teacher, feminist
- Pauline Perlmutter Steinem (1864–1940), American suffragist
- Pauline Perry, Baroness Perry of Southwark (b. 1931), British politician
- Pauline Pfeif (b. 2002), German diver
- Pauline Pfeiffer (1895–1951), American journalist
- Pauline Phelps (1870–1963), American writer
- Pauline Phillips (1918–2013), US writer of Dear Abby
- Pauline Picard (1947–2009), Canadian politician
- Pauline Picard (died 1922), Formerly missing French girl
- Pauline Polaire (1904–1986), Italian actor
- Pauline Prior-Pitt, British poet
- Pauline Quirke (b. 1959), English actress
- Pauline Ramart (1880–1953), French chemist and politician
- Pauline Reade (d. 1963), British murder victim
- Pauline Réage, pseudonym of French journalist Anne Desclos (1907–1998)
- Pauline Richards, Australian politician
- Pauline Robertson (b. 1968), Scottish field hockey player
- Pauline Rochefort (b. 1957), Canadian politician
- Pauline Roland (1805–1852), French feminist and socialist
- Pauline Rubin (footballer) (born 1994), Swedish footballer
- Pauline Dohn Rudolph (1865–1934), US painter
- Pauline Sabin (1887–1955), US prohibition repeal leader and Republican party official
- Pauline Scanlon, Irish singer
- Pauline Schmidt (1865–1944), Danish magician
- Pauline Agassiz Shaw (1841–1917), US philanthropist and social reformer
- Pauline Small (1924–2005), Crow tribal politician
- Pauline Smith (1882–1959), South African novelist
- Pauline Staegemann (1838–1909), Prussian socialist, feminist and trade unionist
- Pauline Stainer (b. 1941), English poet
- Pauline Starke (1901–1977), US actor
- Pauline B. Story (1870–1952), American composer
- Pauline Anna Strom (1946–2020), US composer and synthesist better known as Trans-Millenia Consort
- Pauline Tallen (b. 1959), Nigerian politician
- Pauline Tennant (1927–2008), British actress
- Pauline Thompson (1942–2012), New Zealand painter
- Pauline Thys (c.1836–1909), French composer and librettist
- Pauline Tompkins (1918–2004), president of Cedar Crest College
- Pauline Tratz (b. 1999), German gymnast
- Pauline, Lady Trevelyan (1816–1866), English painter
- Pauline Trigère (1908–2002), Franco-American fashion designer
- Pauline Tully, Irish politician
- Pauline Turner, Scottish actress
- Pauline Vanier (1898–1991), Canadian vice-regal consort
- Pauline (singer) (Pauline Vasseur) (b. 1988), French singer
- Pauline Viardot (1821–1910), French singer
- Pauline Wagner (1910–2014), American actress, dancer and glamour girl
- Pauline Wayne (b. ca 1906), US President Taft's cow
- Pauline Webb (1927–2017), English ecumenist, author, and broadcaster
- Pauline Payne Whitney (1874–1916), US heiress
- Pauline van der Wildt (b. 1944), Dutch swimmer
- Pauline of Württemberg (disambiguation)
  - Pauline Therese of Württemberg (1800–1873), daughter of Duke Louis of Württemberg and third wife of King William I of Württemberg
  - Princess Pauline of Württemberg (1810–1856), daughter of Prince Paul of Württemberg and second wife of William, Duke of Nassau
  - Princess Pauline of Württemberg (1877–1965), daughter of William II of Württemberg and wife of William Frederick, Prince of Wied
- Pauline A. Young (1900–1991), African-American teacher, activist, and humanitarian

== Fictional characters ==
- Pauline Fowler, a character from the British soap opera EastEnders, portrayed by Wendy Richard
- Pauline, a character in Nintendo's Donkey Kong and Mario franchises

== See also ==
- Pauline (disambiguation) (other meanings of the word Pauline)
- The Perils of Pauline, a series of films
- Paulina
- Pavlina
