= Stanley Slagg =

American politician

Stanley Wilmer Slagg (July 6, 1903 – December 22, 1978) was an American lawyer and politician from Edgerton, Wisconsin, who served two terms as a Republican member of the Wisconsin State Assembly, and afterwards repeatedly ran for various elective offices, either as a Progressive or as a Republican.

== Background ==
Slagg was born in the Town of Albion in Dane County, Wisconsin on July 6, 1903, the son of Wilmer A. Slagg (1867–1936) and Mary (née Silverwood) Slagg (1872–1954). He was educated in the public schools of Dane County, and graduated from Edgerton High School. He graduated from the University of Wisconsin Law School in 1924, and went into law practice with George Washington Blanchard in Edgerton, Wisconsin. He was appointed an assistant district attorney in Dane County in 1926 by Philip La Follette.

== Elective office ==
Slagg won the Republican primary election for the first Rock County Assembly district (Blanchard's former seat) in 1928, receiving 3,683 votes to 2,836 for Thomas S. Nolan. In the general election of November, 1928, he was elected, with 10,747 votes to 3,482 for Democrat Edward Schmidley. He defeated a challenger in the 1930 primary, and faced no opposition in the general election.

In 1932, having run unsuccessfully as a Progressive delegate to the 1932 Republican National Convention, he was unseated in the Republican primary by Edward Grassman, who won the subsequent general election and would hold the seat until 1953. In 1934, he came in fourth in a four-way race for the Progressive nomination for lieutenant governor; in 1938, he came in third in a three-way race for the Progressive nomination for Wisconsin's 1st congressional district (another office which Blanchard had once held); in 1940, he received the nomination, and came in second (ahead of the Democrat) to incumbent Republican Stephen Bolles. By 1942, he had returned to the Republican Party, and sought (unsuccessfully) nomination to the State Senate; in 1948 and 1950, to the Assembly (in both cases losing again to Grassman); and in 1952 for the Assembly, losing to eventual victor Clyde Jewett (Grassman was not a candidate). At the 1952 Republican Party 1st Congressional District convention, he was one of the few delegates arguing for one man one vote reapportionment of the State Senate. Slagg also served as city attorney and mayor of Edgerton, Wisconsin and Rock County, Wisconsin family court commissioner. Slagg died on December 22, 1978.
