= George W. Blanchard =

American politician (1884–1964)

George Washington Blanchard
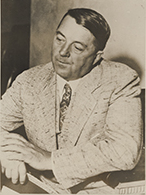

Member of the U.S. House of Representatives from Wisconsin's 1st district
- In office March 4, 1933 – January 3, 1935
- Preceded by: Thomas Ryum Amlie
- Succeeded by: Thomas Ryum Amlie

Member of the Wisconsin Senate from the 15th district
- In office January 3, 1927 – March 3, 1933
- Preceded by: Alva Garey
- Succeeded by: Alexander Paul

Member of the Wisconsin State Assembly from the Rock 1st district
- In office January 5, 1925 – January 3, 1927
- Preceded by: Alexander E. Matheson
- Succeeded by: John S. Baker

Personal details
- Born: January 26, 1884 Colby, Wisconsin
- Died: October 2, 1964 (aged 80) Edgerton, Wisconsin
- Resting place: Fassett Cemetery, Edgerton, Wisconsin
- Party: Republican
- Spouse: Helen Rachel Sherman (m. 1913–1964)
- Children: George Washington Blanchard Jr.^{(b. 1915; died 1940)}; David James Blanchard^{(b. 1921; died 1962)}; Thomas Blanchard^{(b. 1925; died 1925)}; Sherman Blanchard^{(b. 1927; died 1938)}
- Relatives: Carolyn Blanchard Allen (daughter-in-law)
- Education: University of Wisconsin; University of Wisconsin Law School
- Profession: Lawyer

George Washington Blanchard Sr. (January 26, 1884 – October 2, 1964) was an American lawyer and Republican politician from Edgerton, Wisconsin. He served one term in the U.S. House of Representatives, representing Wisconsin's 1st congressional district during the 73rd Congress (1933–1935). Prior to his election to Congress, he represented Rock County for six years in the Wisconsin Senate (1927–1933) and one term in the State Assembly (1925). Initially a member of the progressive faction of Republicans, he fell out with progressive leadership and joined the stalwart faction in 1925. Earlier in his career, he served as executive clerk to Wisconsin governor Emanuel L. Philipp.

His son, David Blanchard, also served in the Wisconsin State Assembly and was speaker of the Assembly during the 1961 term. David's wife, Carolyn Blanchard Allen, was also a member of the Assembly.

== Early life and career ==
George W. Blanchard was born in Colby, Wisconsin, and received his primary education in the public schools of that vicinity. He went on to attend the University of Wisconsin, graduating from the College of Letters and Science in 1906. He then graduating from the University of Wisconsin Law School in 1910, was a member of the Sigma Alpha Epsilon fraternity. Between his school terms, he also served two years as principal of the Colby high school.

After being admitted to the bar in 1910, Blanchard moved to Edgerton, Wisconsin, in Rock County and began his legal career. He won his first public office in 1912, when he was elected city attorney of Edgerton. In 1914, Blanchard was selected to serve on the income tax assessment board for Rock County. In 1913, he formed a partnership with W. G. Atwell for law and real estate work. Two years later, they expanded their business with two other partners as a real estate investment company, calling the business the Edgerton Investment Co.

In January 1917, Blanchard was hired as an executive clerk to Emanuel L. Philipp at the start of his second term as governor of Wisconsin. In that role, he had charge of the "outer executive office" and assisted the governor's chief aide, George Hudnall, in drafting legislation. In 1920, Blanchard became city clerk of Edgerton, while also continuing to hold the office of city attorney.

== Political career ==
In 1921, Blanchard was elected president of the Progressive Republican club of Rock County. He was active in several elections before and after, supporting progressive Republican candidates.

In 1924, Blanchard entered the race for Wisconsin State Assembly in Rock County's 1st Assembly district. At the time, the Rock County 1st district comprised roughly the northern half of Rock County. He defeated Otto A. Bach in the Republican primary, and went on to defeat Democrat James R. Lamb by a wide margin in the general election.

At the start of the 1925 term, there was a significant intra-party crisis over the election of a speaker. The state progressive establishment, led by governor John J. Blaine, pushed for the election of Herman W. Sachtjen of Madison. A significant faction of progressives, who had become restive under Blaine's leadership, joined with conservatives to resist Sachtjen's election. Blanchard lined up with the rebels, and accused the state establishment of trying to cram Sachtjen down their throats. Sachtjen was eventually able secure the votes to become speaker, with Blanchard voting in favor, but Blanchard subsequently identified with the conservative faction of Republicans. After supporting Sachtjen's election, Blanchard was appointed to the important Assembly committees on rules and the judiciary. Throughout the term, Blanchard played a leading role in debates and was then chosen as chairman of the state conservative Republican convention that fall. At the convention, Blanchard was even encouraged to enter the race for United States Senate in special election to succeed Robert M. La Follette Sr., but declined to be considered.

In 1926, incumbent state senator Alva Garey announced he would not run for re-election to the Wisconsin Senate; Blanchard quickly stepped into the race for his 15th Senate district seat. The 15th district comprised all of Rock County. Blanchard defeated two progressive opponents in the Republican primary, and faced no opponent in the general election. He faced no opponent in the primary or general election when he was re-elected in 1930.

Blanchard immediately became a leader of the conservative faction in the Wisconsin Senate, and was described as a close friend of governor Fred R. Zimmerman, who was sworn in that same year. Blanchard accompanied Zimmerman on an airplane flight in August 1927 to Marinette, Wisconsin, for an American Legion convention. It was the first time either man had flown on an airplane. Blanchard was rumored as a candidate for U.S. Senate again in 1928, to challenge Robert M. La Follette Jr. as a conservative ticket with Zimmerman, who would be seeking re-election as governor, but Blanchard ultimately did not enter the race.

== Congress ==
Wisconsin's 1st congressional district 1912–1931

Blanchard made his first run for U.S. House of Representatives in a 1931 special election, following the death of long-time representative Henry Allen Cooper. Cooper had represented Wisconsin's 1st congressional district, comprising roughly the southeast corner of the state. Blanchard faced a crowded primary against state representative Edward F. Hilker, attorney Thomas Ryum Amlie, and two other candidates. Blanchard ultimately finished second, falling 1,300 votes short of the progressive candidate, Amlie.

Wisconsin's 1st congressional district 1932–1963

In the Spring of 1932, conservatives in southeast Wisconsin began endorsing Blanchard as a candidate for Wisconsin's 1st congressional district again in 1932, indicating a primary rematch against Amlie. Blanchard's record of supporting prohibition was seen as a major liability, however, with many in the district favoring liberalization of the law. In the meantime, the Wisconsin Legislature had redistricted the congressional map, removing Waukesha County and adding Green County to the 1st congressional district. Also happening during 1932, Blanchard was endorsed by a stalwart convention of Wisconsin Republicans as successor to United States district judge Claude Luse, who died in May of that year. Hoover, however, did not appoint a replacement for that role before the end of his term. In the meantime, Blanchard ramped up his campaign for Congress, earning the endorsement of the district convention in July. In the 1932 primary, Blanchard and Amlie had the field to themselves with no other competitors. Blanchard won a narrow victory, taking 51.75% of the vote.

The 1932 general election was a Democratic wave, prompted by the Great Depression and assisted by progressive Republicans throwing their support behind Roosevelt and his coalition. Despite the unfavorable political environment, Blanchard won a narrow victory in the general election, receiving 48.5% of the vote. Blanchard continued serving in the Wisconsin Senate up until his inauguration to the U.S. House in March 1933, allowing him to continue as a leader in the first months of the 61st Wisconsin Legislature.

In the 73rd Congress, Blanchard joined large bipartisan majorities supporting several bills proposed by the new Democratic administration of Franklin D. Roosevelt to deal with the ongoing economic emergencies caused by the Great Depression. Within the first month, he voted for the Emergency Banking Act of 1933 dealing with the ongoing financial crisis, and the Agricultural Adjustment Act, to try to prop up American farmers. Blanchard ultimately broke with the administration on more controversial measures, such as the Securities Exchange Act of 1934.

In the Spring of 1934, the progressive faction split off from the Republican Party of Wisconsin and started the Wisconsin Progressive Party, dramatically altering the politics of the state. Blanchard initially proceeded with his plans to seek re-election on the Republican Party ticket, and was renominated without opposition in the September primary. However, just days after the primary, Blanchard withdrew from the race to accept a job as special counsel for the United States Brewers' Association.

== Later years ==
Blanchard did not run for public office again, but remained active in state politics. He ultimately devoted much of the rest of his life to his legal career. He died after a long illness at Edgerton's Community Memorial Hospital on October 2, 1964.

== Personal life and family ==
George W. Blanchard was the second of six children born to Horace J. Blanchard Sr. and his wife Emma (née Brinker). Horace Blanchard was a pioneer of the area around Colby, Wisconsin. He was active in the Republican Party and held several local offices.

George W. Blanchard married Helen Rachel Sherman, of Plover, Wisconsin, on November 5, 1910. They met while Helen was teaching school in Colby. They had four sons together, but all four preceded them in death. Thomas died in infancy and Sherman died in childhood. Their eldest son, George Jr., committed suicide in 1940, at age 25.

Their last living son, David James Blanchard, died at age 41. David served four terms in the Wisconsin State Assembly before his death, and was speaker of the Assembly during the 1961 term. David's wife, Carolyn, succeeded him in the Assembly and also served four terms.

== Electoral history ==
=== Wisconsin Assembly (1924) ===
Year	Election	Date	Elected				Defeated				Total	Plurality
1924	Primary	Sep. 2	George W. Blanchard	Republican			Otto A. Bach	Rep.				
1924	General	Nov. 4	George W. Blanchard	Republican	8,457	81.92%	James R. Lamb	Dem.	1,867	18.08%	10,324	6,590

=== Wisconsin Senate (1926, 1930) ===
Year	Election	Date	Elected				Defeated				Total	Plurality
1926	Primary	Sep. 7	George W. Blanchard	Republican	7,516	56.89%	Frank Roach	Rep.	5,018	37.98%	13,212	2,498
1926	Primary	Sep. 7	George W. Blanchard	Republican	7,516	56.89%	Charles Swan	Rep.	678	5.13%	13,212	2,498
1926	General	Nov. 2	George W. Blanchard	Republican	11,024	100.0%	--unopposed--				11,024	
1930	General	Nov. 4	George W. Blanchard (inc)	Republican	10,519	100.0%	--unopposed--				10,519	

=== U.S. House (1931–1934) ===
Year	Election	Date	Elected				Defeated				Total	Plurality
1931 (special)	Primary	Oct. 3	Thomas Ryum Amlie	Republican	13,765	44.48%	George W. Blanchard	Rep.	12,433	40.17%	30,949	1,332
1931 (special)	Primary	Oct. 3	Thomas Ryum Amlie	Republican	13,765	44.48%	Thorwald M. Beck	Rep.	3,500	11.31%	30,949	1,332
1931 (special)	Primary	Oct. 3	Thomas Ryum Amlie	Republican	13,765	44.48%	Edward F. Hilker	Rep.	923	2.98%	30,949	1,332
1931 (special)	Primary	Oct. 3	Thomas Ryum Amlie	Republican	13,765	44.48%	T. O. F. Randolph	Rep.	328	1.06%	30,949	1,332
1932	Primary	Sep. 20	George W. Blanchard	Republican	35,832	51.75%	Thomas Ryum Amlie (inc)	Rep.	33,401	48.24%	69,243	2,431
1932	General	Nov. 8	George W. Blanchard	Republican	50,874	48.48%	William D. Thompson	Dem.	48,093	45.83%	104,928	2,781
1932	General	Nov. 8	George W. Blanchard	Republican	50,874	48.48%	Otis J. Bouma	Soc.	5,141	4.90%	104,928	2,781
1932	General	Nov. 8	George W. Blanchard	Republican	50,874	48.48%	Henry H. Tubbs	Proh.	418	0.00%	104,928	2,781
1932	General	Nov. 8	George W. Blanchard	Republican	50,874	48.48%	John Sekat	Comm.	402	0.38%	104,928	2,781

Wisconsin State Assembly
Preceded by Alexander E. Matheson	Member of the Wisconsin State Assembly from the Rock 1st district January 5, 1925 – January 3, 1927	Succeeded by John S. Baker
Wisconsin Senate
Preceded by Alva Garey	Member of the Wisconsin Senate from the 15th district January 3, 1927 – March 3, 1933	Succeeded by Alexander Paul
U.S. House of Representatives
Preceded by Thomas Ryum Amlie	Member of the U.S. House of Representatives from Wisconsin's 1st congressional district March 4, 1933 – January 3, 1935	Succeeded by Thomas Ryum Amlie
