= Rascal (film) =

1969 film by Norman Tokar

- Theatrical release poster
- Directed by: Norman Tokar
- Written by: Harold Swanton
- Based on: Rascal: A Memoir of a Better Era by Sterling North
- Produced by: James Algar
- Starring: Steve Forrest; Bill Mumy
- Narrated by: Walter Pidgeon
- Cinematography: William E. Snyder
- Edited by: Norman R. Palmer
- Music by: Buddy Baker
- Production company: Walt Disney Productions
- Distributed by: Buena Vista Distribution
- Release date: June 11, 1969
- Running time: 85 minutes
- Country: United States
- Language: English

Rascal is a 1969 American drama film made by Walt Disney Productions. The film is based on Sterling North's book of the same name which tells the story of young Sterling North and his "ringtailed wonder" pet raccoon, Rascal. Although set in 1918 Wisconsin, the movie was filmed in California.

== Plot ==
In the summer of 1918 in the little town of Brailsford Junction in central Wisconsin, Willard North takes his son Sterling out into the woods, where a lynx surprises a family of raccoons, who run away, leaving a young raccoon behind. Sterling brings the raccoon home and names him Rascal. As Willard has to leave for work, his daughter, Theo, lines up interviews for a potential live-in housekeeper before returning to her job in Chicago. Willard agrees to meet with Theo's favorite, Mrs. Satterfield, but dismisses her afterwards, deciding that Sterling can take care of himself.

During the summer Rascal starts causing trouble, including trashing up a local store and digging up a neighbor's corn patch. A local constable threatens to hold Sterling responsible for damages unless he keeps Rascal caged up. On his way home, Sterling takes Rascal to a race between a Stanley Steamer and a sulky. Rascal's presence inspires the sulky's horse, Donnybrook, to win the race, changing the town's opinion of him. Theo returns from Chicago, finding the home in a mess. Enraged, Theo confronts Willard, reminding him that Sterling is his son who needs help. Willard vows to become a better father to Sterling.

Later that night, Rascal hears the mating call of a female raccoon through the window and tries to escape through Theo’s room, waking her and everyone else. Following a scuffle where Rascal bites his finger, Sterling realizes it is time to let Rascal go. The next day, Sterling sets out in his homemade canoe and returns Rascal to his old stomping grounds, where he quickly locates a female racoon. But before Sterling leaves, the lynx returns. As he comes to help, Rascal and his new mate outwit the lynx, sending him tumbling into the water. Sterling leaves, knowing that the two will be able to protect each other.

== Cast ==
- Bill Mumy as Sterling North
  - Walter Pidgeon as adult Sterling North (voice)
- Steve Forrest as Willard North
- Pamela Toll as Theo North
- Elsa Lanchester as Mrs. Satterfield
- Henry Jones as Garth Shadwick
- Bettye Ackerman as Miss Whalen
- Jonathan Daly as Rev. Thurman
- John Fiedler as Cy Jenkins
- Richard Erdman as Walt Dabbett
- Herbert Anderson as Mr. Pringle
- Robert Emhardt as Constable Stacey
- Steve Carlson as Norman Bradshaw
- Maudie Prickett as Miss Pince-Nez
- David McCallum as Ice Cream Man

== Differences from the book ==
In the award-winning book of the same name, all three of Sterling North's real-life siblings are featured in the story: his brother Herschel and his sisters Theodora (Theo) and the future poet and editor Jessica Nelson North. Theo is the only sibling featured in the film version.

== Music ==
The film features the song "Summer Sweet" by Bobby Russell.

== Critical reception ==
Rascal was the first film given a review in a publication by film critic Gene Siskel, appearing in the Chicago Tribune one month before he became the paper's official film critic in 1969. His review of the film was not favorable ("Because of excessive gimmickry, most kids will miss the tenderness", he wrote).

Howard Thompson of The New York Times described the film as "genteel, sweet-natured and appealingly frail", but thought the story "gets a little patly philosophical in trying to thrust practical responsibilities on the young hero, Bill Mumy, and his carefree, widowed father, Steve Forrest." Variety said that the film is a "diverting adaptation of Sterling North book about a boy and his pet raccoon. Rascal will pull younger generation as well as family-groups in to see a clean, well-presented, unashamedly sentimental Disney film." Charles Champlin of the Los Angeles Times wrote that "for the young (and old) audience for which it is intended, Rascal is practically perfect hot weather fare, offering a spacious escape to a world of tree-shaded streets and spacious lawns, verandas, woods and ponds, trotting horses and Stanley Steamers (one at least)." The Monthly Film Bulletin stated: "Routine Disney boy-befriends-animal feature, agreeable enough on its own terms but as mawkishly sentimental as usual and with the additional embarrassment of a commentary by Walter Pidgeon which keeps insisting what a marvellous boyhood summer it all was."

== See also ==
- List of American films of 1969
- Araiguma Rascal, a Japanese anime based on Rascal
