= Charles Woodworth =

Charles Woodworth may refer to:

- Charles E. Woodworth (1897–1966), American entomologist
- Charles W. Woodworth (1865–1940), American entomologist
