= Carolyn Blanchard Allen =

American politician and funeral home operator (1921–2018)

Member of the Wisconsin State Assembly from the Rock 2nd district
- In office April 9, 1963 – January 4, 1971
- Preceded by: David J. Blanchard
- Succeeded by: Janet Soergel Mielke

Personal details
- Born: Carolyn Jensen; June 13, 1921 Cambridge, Wisconsin, US
- Died: October 9, 2018 (aged 97) Cambridge, Wisconsin, US
- Party: Republican
- Spouses: David J. Blanchard (m. 1943; died 1962); Malcolm V. Allen (m. 1969)
- Education: University of Wisconsin–Madison (B.S.)

Carolyn Blanchard Allen (born Carolyn Jensen; June 13, 1921 – October 9, 2018) was an American Republican politician and funeral home operator from Rock County, Wisconsin. She served four terms in the Wisconsin State Assembly after winning a 1963 special election to succeed her deceased first husband, David J. Blanchard.

== Background ==
Allen was born Carolyn Jensen on June 13, 1921, in Cambridge, Wisconsin, daughter of Clarence B. and Eva (née Bilstad) Jensen. She graduated from Cambridge High School, and from the University of Wisconsin–Madison with a Bachelor of Science degree in speech therapy.

She married David J. Blanchard September 29, 1943. They moved to David's home town of Edgerton, Wisconsin, where he practiced law. David was elected as a Republican to the Wisconsin State Assembly representing Rock County's 2nd Assembly district in 1954. At the time of his death, he was speaker of the Assembly.

== Legislative career ==
She was first elected to the Assembly in 1963 in a special election to fill the vacancy caused by the death of David Blanchard. She was the first Wisconsin woman to be elected to the Legislature via a special election, and re-elected in 1964, 1966, and 1968. On August 30, 1969, she married Malcolm V. Allen in her home in Edgerton. In 1970, while easily winning her primary, she was defeated in the general election by Democrat Janet Soergel Mielke by 63 votes (5824 votes to 5761). She attempted to unseat Mielke in 1972, but fell short by a wider margin in what was now the 47th Assembly district.

== After the legislature ==
For 24 years she lived in Evansville where she and Malcolm operated Allen Funeral Home. He died on May 16, 1987. Allen died on October 9, 2018, in Cambridge, Wisconsin, at the age of 97.

Wisconsin State Assembly
Preceded by David J. Blanchard	Member of the Wisconsin State Assembly from the Rock 2nd district April 9, 1963 – January 4, 1971	Succeeded by Janet Soergel Mielke
