= Edgerton, Wisconsin =

- City
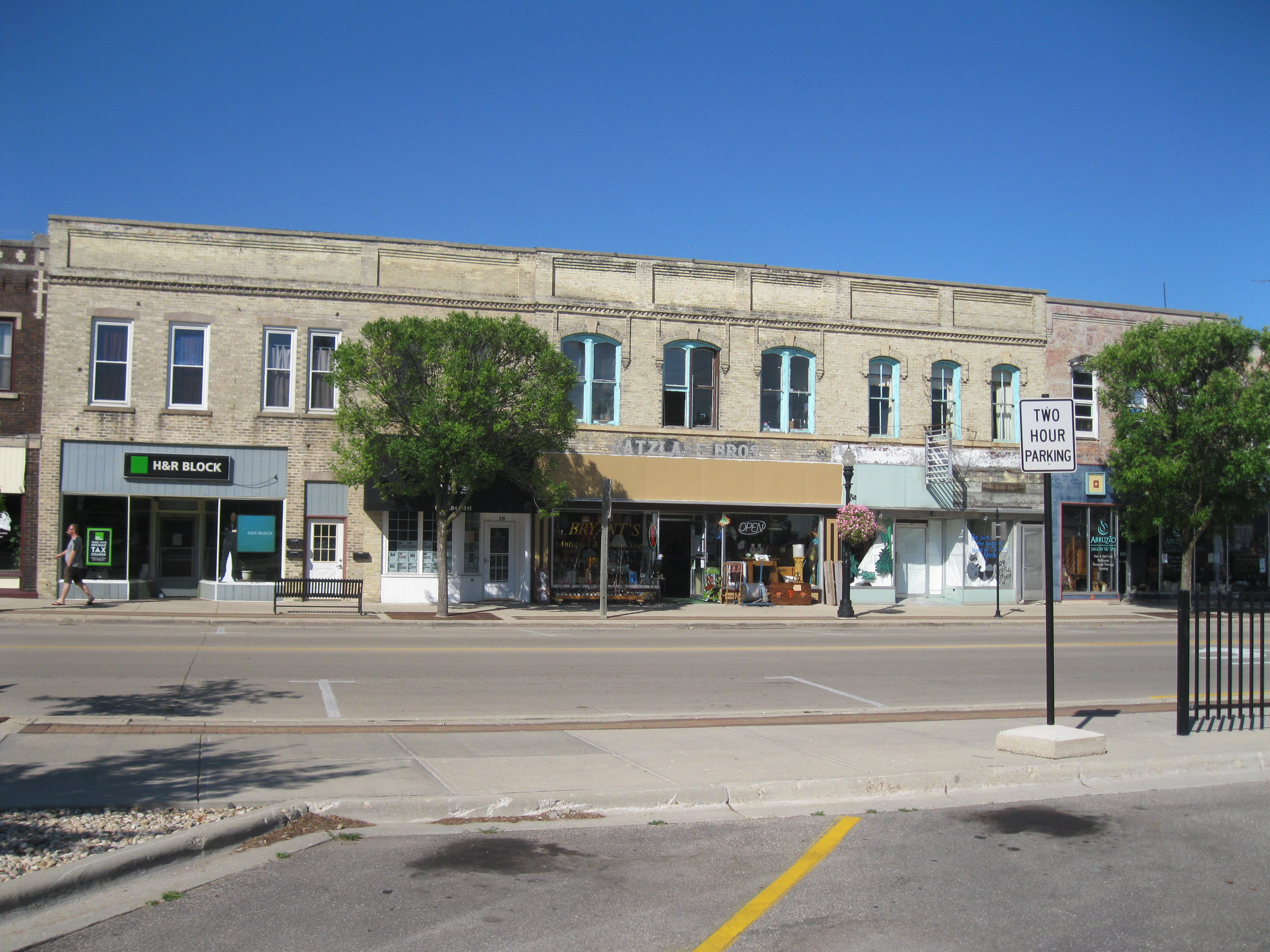
- Fulton Street in downtown Edgerton
- Motto: "Tobacco City U.S.A."
- Interactive map of Edgerton, Wisconsin
- Location within Wisconsin Location within the United States
- Coordinates: 42°50′10″N 89°4′23″W
- Country: United States
- State: Wisconsin
- Counties: Rock, Dane

Area
  - Total: 4.16 sq mi (10.78 km^{2})
  - Land: 4.16 sq mi (10.77 km^{2})
  - Water: 0.0039 sq mi (0.01 km^{2})
- Elevation: 817 ft (249 m)

Population (2020)
  - Total: 5,945
  - Density: 1,429/sq mi (551.9/km^{2})
- Time zone: UTC-6 (Central (CST))
  - Summer (DST): UTC-5 (CDT)
- Zip Code: 53534
- Area code: 608
- FIPS code: 55-22575
- GNIS feature ID: 1564443
- Website: https://www.edgerton.wi.gov/

Edgerton is a city in Rock and Dane counties in the U.S. state of Wisconsin. The population was 5,945 at the 2020 census, of which 5,799 were in Rock County and 146 were in Dane County. Edgerton was historically known as "Tobacco City U.S.A." because of the importance of tobacco growing in the region.

== History ==
Originally called Fulton Station, Edgerton was named after 19th-century businessman Elisha W. Edgerton, or his brother Benjamin Hyde Edgerton, a civil engineer.

In the late 19th and early 20th centuries, Edgerton was the center of the tobacco industry in southern Wisconsin. At one time, there were as many as 52 tobacco warehouses dotting the streets of the city. Queen Anne style mansions along Edgerton's Washington Street testify to the wealth and prominence some merchants once had. The 1890s Carlton Hotel, once located on Henry Street, also once served as an additional reminder of the tobacco industry's influence. Although built by a brewing firm, the hotel (which burned to the ground in the 1990s) was frequented by tobacco buyers and sellers.

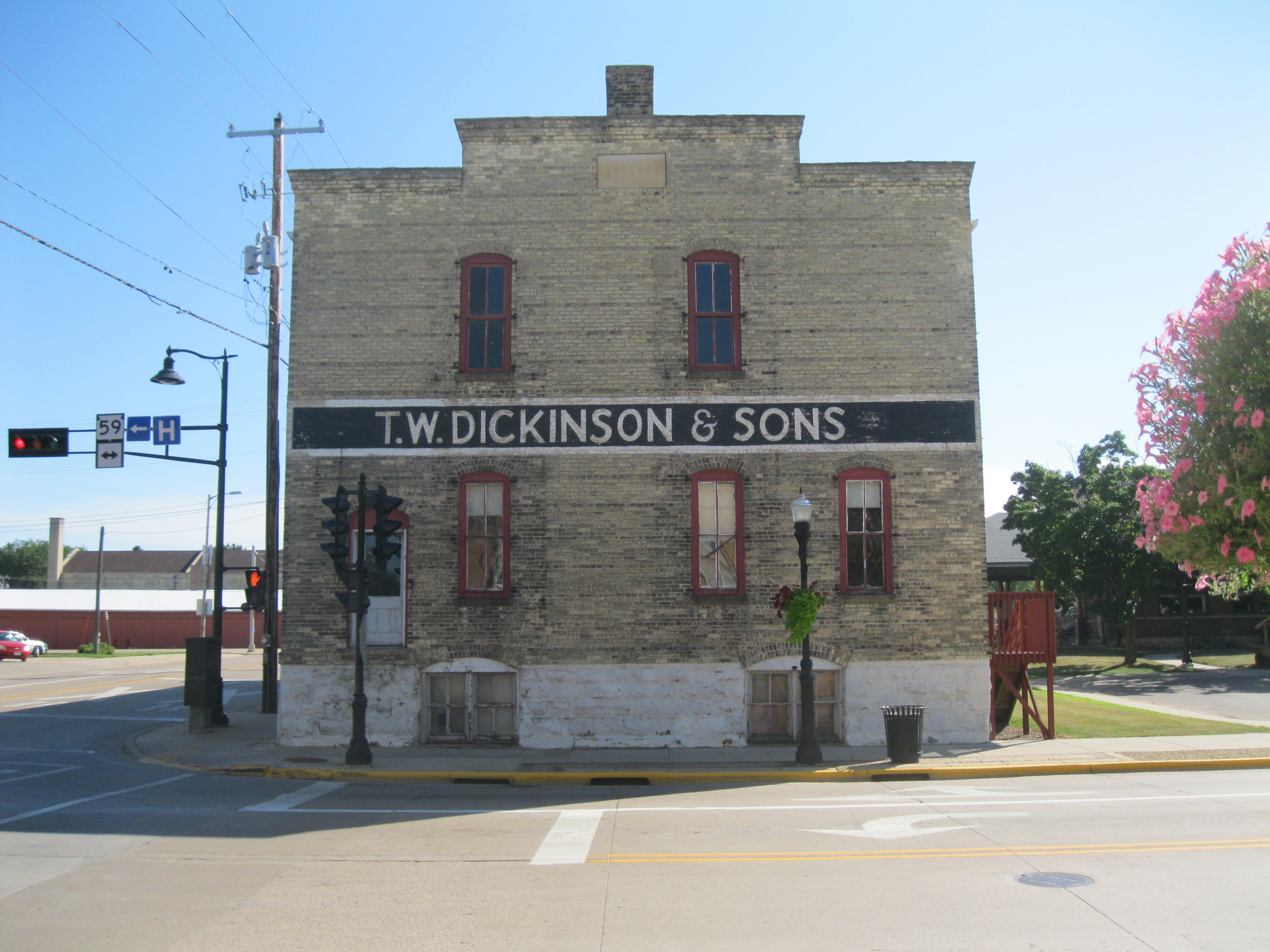
The Pomeroy & Pelton Tobacco Warehouse in downtown Edgerton

=== Edgerton Bible case ===
In 1886, Catholic parents in Edgerton protested the reading of the King James Bible in the village schools because they considered the Douay version the correct translation. The school board argued that Catholic children could ignore the Bible readings or sit in the cloakroom while the rest of the children listened to the reading of a Protestant version of the Bible. Because the school board refused to change its policy, several families brought suit on the grounds that the schools' practice conflicted with the Wisconsin Constitution, which forbade sectarian instruction in public schools.

The circuit court rejected their argument, deciding in 1888 that the readings were not sectarian because both translations were of the same work. The parents appealed their case to the Wisconsin Supreme Court, which overruled the circuit court on March 18, 1890, concluding that reading the Bible did—in fact—constitute sectarian instruction and thus illegally united the functions of church and state.

Seventy years later, when the U.S. Supreme Court banned prayer from the public schools in 1963, the Edgerton Bible case was one of the precedents cited by Justice William Brennan.

== Geography ==
According to the United States Census Bureau, the city has a total area of 4.14 square miles (10.72 km^{2}), all land. None of the area is covered with water, except for Saunders Creek, although the city is within a five-minute drive of Lake Koshkonong.

Lake Koshkonong is the third largest lake in Wisconsin, and though very shallow, it provides a place for water sports. Skiing, tubing, and fishing are common activities on the lake or the Rock River, which feeds it. The Rock River runs all the way to the Mississippi.

== Demographics ==
Historical population
Census	Pop.	Note	%±
1880	869		—
1890	1,595		83.5%
1900	2,192		37.4%
1910	2,513		14.6%
1920	2,688		7.0%
1930	2,906		8.1%
1940	3,266		12.4%
1950	3,507		7.4%
1960	4,000		14.1%
1970	4,118		3.0%
1980	4,335		5.3%
1990	4,254		−1.9%
2000	4,933		16.0%
2010	5,461		10.7%
2020	5,945		8.9%
U.S. Decennial Census

=== 2020 census ===
As of the census of 2020, the population was 5,945. The population density was 1,429.4 inhabitants per square mile (551.9/km^{2}). There were 2,587 housing units at an average density of 622.0 per square mile (240.2/km^{2}). The racial makeup of the city was 90.6% White, 0.9% Black or African American, 0.7% Asian, 0.6% Native American, 1.6% from other races, and 5.5% from two or more races. Ethnically, the population was 5.7% Hispanic or Latino of any race.

=== 2010 census ===
As of the census of 2010, there were 5,461 people, 2,227 households, and 1,426 families residing in the city. The population density was 1,319.1 inhabitants per square mile (509.3/km^{2}). There were 2,410 housing units at an average density of 582.1 per square mile (224.8/km^{2}). The racial makeup of the city was 94.9% White, 0.9% African American, 0.8% Native American, 0.5% Asian, 1.4% from other races, and 1.4% from two or more races. Hispanic or Latino of any race were 4.1% of the population.

There were 2,227 households, of which 34.2% had children under the age of 18 living with them, 47.2% were married couples living together, 11.0% had a female householder with no husband present, 5.8% had a male householder with no wife present, and 36.0% were non-families. 29.3% of all households were made up of individuals, and 12% had someone living alone who was 65 years of age or older. The average household size was 2.43 and the average family size was 3.01.

The median age in the city was 35.7 years. 26% of residents were under the age of 18; 7% were between the ages of 18 and 24; 29.4% were from 25 to 44; 24.8% were from 45 to 64, and 12.7% were 65 years of age or older. The gender makeup of the city was 48.8% male and 51.2% female.

== Education ==
Public education is provided by the Edgerton School District. The District includes the following schools:

- Community Elementary School
- Yahara Valley Elementary School
- Edgerton Middle School
- Edgerton High School

== Arts and culture ==
=== Annual cultural events ===
Because Edgerton was once the center of the tobacco growing region in Wisconsin, the community's annual celebration is called Tobacco Days. The community celebration includes live music, food, family entertainment, a craft fair, an open-air market, living history events and demonstrations, tobacco demonstrations, citywide rummage sales, a men's slow pitch softball tournament, book sales, a parade, and a car show.

The Sterling North Book and Film Festival, which takes place annually the last weekend in September, brings together authors and filmmakers with the community.

=== Tourism ===
The Sterling North Home and Museum is the childhood home of authors Sterling North and Jessica Nelson North MacDonald. North's most famous book, Rascal, was set in Edgerton and he used the town as the setting for several of his books, referring to it as "Brailsford Junction".

The Pomeroy and Pelton Tobacco Warehouse, known as the T. W. Dickinson & Son Tobacco Warehouse after it was purchased by Weetman Dickinson, is on the National Register of Historic Places. It is the oldest free-standing brick warehouse in Wisconsin.

Edgerton is also known for its association with Pauline Jacobus. Jacobus and her husband, Oscar Jacobus, were responsible for the first artistic pottery created in Chicago in the mid-1880s. By 1888, the couple had moved their business to Edgerton. Although Oscar's death and an economic depression disrupted the business in the 1890s, Pauline Jacobus continued making pottery in Edgerton until a fire in the early 1900s that destroyed her rural Edgerton home, "The Bogart". Much admired and sought after as an American art form, "Pauline Pottery" is recognized in antique and art galleries throughout the world. A log cabin from the old Bogart site and the factory warehouse where Pauline Pottery was first made in Edgerton still survive.

== Notable people ==
- Rich Bickle, NASCAR driver
- David Blanchard, former Speaker of the Wisconsin State Assembly
- George W. Blanchard, former U.S. Representative
- Burrows Burdick, former Wisconsin State Representative
- Derek Carrier, NFL player for Washington Redskins and San Francisco 49ers
- Harland E. Everson, former Wisconsin State Representative
- Abner S. Flagg, Wisconsin State Representative
- Ryan Fox, US National Rower
- Alva Garey, former Wisconsin State Senator
- Lewis E. Gettle, former Wisconsin State Representative and lawyer
- Edward Grassman, former Wisconsin State Representative
- Pauline Jacobus, pottery artisan
- Paul Janus, American football player
- Jimmy Johnson, member of the College Football Hall of Fame
- Simon Lord, former Wisconsin State Senator
- John T. Manske, former Wisconsin State Representative
- Janet Soergel Mielke, former Wisconsin State Representative
- Jessica Nelson North, author
- Sterling North, author
- Arielle North Olson, author
- Tom Pratt, American football coach
- Stanley Slagg, Wisconsin State Representative and lawyer
- Steve Stricker, PGA Tour golfer
- Debi Towns, Wisconsin State Representative
- Lawrence C. Whittet, Wisconsin State Representative
- Rollie Williams, NFL player
