= Arielle North Olson =

Children's book author

- Occupation: Author
- Relatives: Sterling North (father), Jessica Nelson North (aunt)
- Writing career
- Notable works: Hurry Home Grandma, Noah's Cats and the Devil's Fire, The Lighthouse Keeper's Daughter

Arielle North Olson is an author of children's books.

== Family ==
Arielle is the daughter of noted author Sterling North, who wrote Rascal. She is also the niece of author, poet and editor Jessica Nelson North. She is one of the copyright owners of Sterling North's body of work. She now has three children and seven grandchildren, and is a resident of St. Louis, Missouri.

Arielle is from a multi-generation literary family. Arielle's great-grandparents, James Hervey Nelson and Sarah Orelup Nelson, were Wisconsin pioneers. In 1917, which would have been her great-grandfather James Hervey Nelson's 100th birthday, three of her great-uncles, including early Amazon missionary Justus Henry Nelson, wrote extended biographies about their parents and their pioneer farm life. These writing efforts may have been a literary inspiration to both her father Sterling and her aunt Jessica.

== Writing career ==
Arielle has written:

- Hurry Home Grandma
- Noah's Cats and the Devil's Fire
- The Lighthouse Keeper's Daughter

She has edited:

- Ask the Bones: Scary Stories from Around the World
- More Bones: Scary Stories From Around The World

She also reviewed children's books for the St. Louis Post Dispatch for 27 years.

Her biography is captured in:

- Contemporary Authors
