= Pomeroy & Pelton Tobacco Warehouse =

Historic tobacco warehouse in Edgerton, Wisconsin

- U.S. National Register of Historic Places
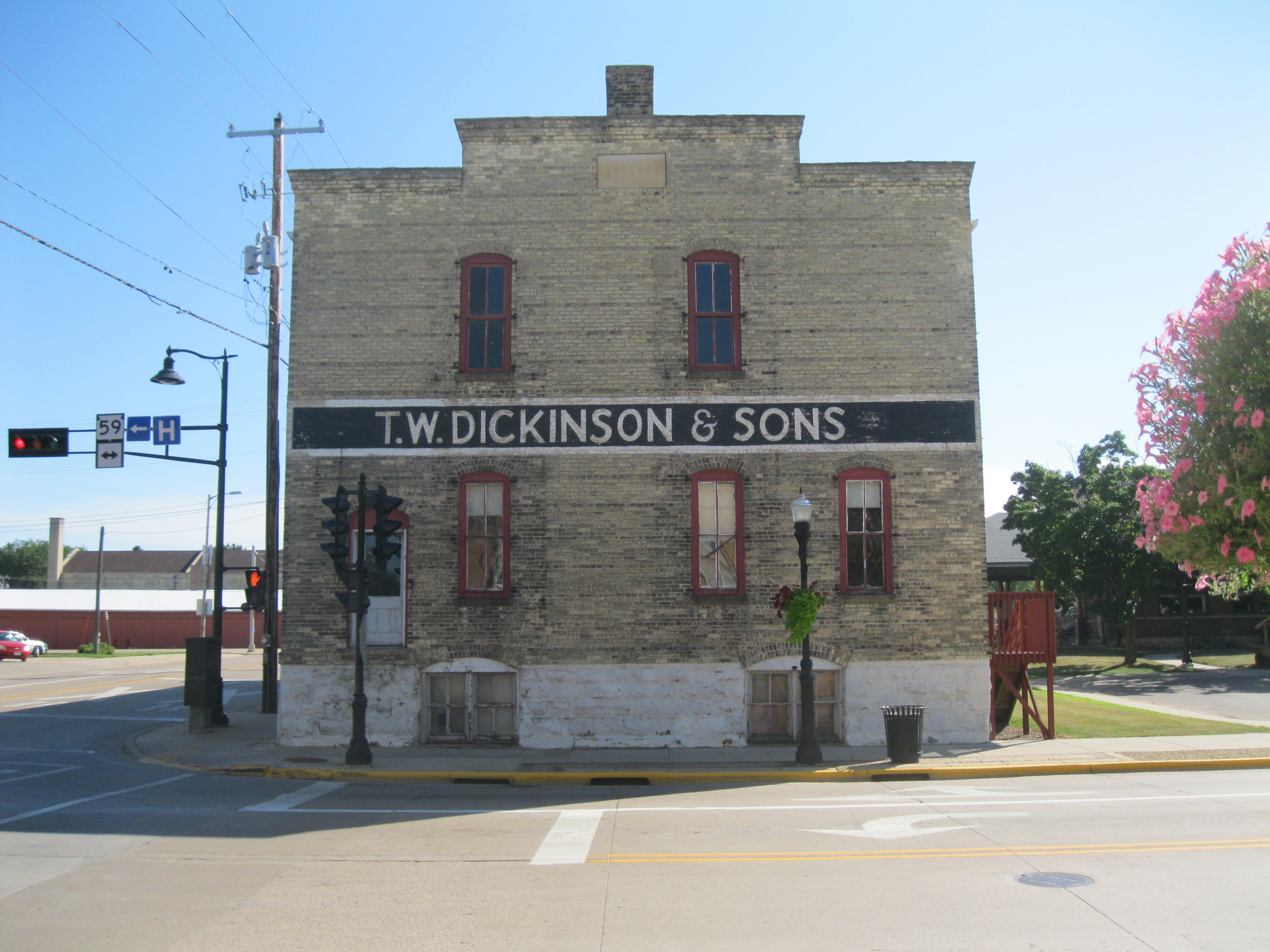
- The warehouse at the intersection of East Fulton Street and WIS 10 in Edgerton, Wisconsin.

- Location within Wisconsin Location within the United States
- Location: 1 West Fulton Street, Edgerton, Wisconsin 53534
- Coordinates: 42°50′32″N 89°00′17″W
- Built: 1885
- NRHP reference No.: 98000848
- Added to NRHP: July 9, 1998

The Pomeroy & Pelton Tobacco Warehouse also known as the T.W. Dickinson Tobacco Warehouse is a historic tobacco warehouse in Edgerton, Wisconsin. The building is listed on the National Register of Historic Places as a historically significant building due to the city of Edgerton being one of the primary producers of tobacco in southern Wisconsin and the Upper Midwest.

== History ==
Rock County was once referred to as "Wisconsin's tobacco land", the city of Edgerton, Wisconsin alone by 1918 produced some 62.4 million pounds of tobacco per year and still today keeps its heritage alive with celebrations like "Tobacco Heritage Days" in July.

Wisconsin's first commercial tobacco was first produced in Walworth County, Wisconsin and Rock County, Wisconsin and was introduced to the state by Orrin Pomeroy (1816-1903) and Ralph Pomeroy (1814-1894). The Pomeroy's were successful in this endeavor and grew the small commodity trade into a business empire. Ralph, Orrin, and William Pomeroy were the sons of Thaddeus and Margaret Pomeroy of Suffield, Connecticut. The Pomeroy family came to the United States from England in 1630 where they made their living by blacksmithing and firearm manufacturing. Thaddeus raised tobacco and passed the knowledge of raising this crop to his sons. The first tobacco grown in Wisconsin was in 1844 by Ralph Pomeroy and J.J. Heistand, two transplant Wisconsinites who had worked in Ohio. The first type of tobacco to be grown was Connecticut shade tobacco.

Slowly but surely the Pomeroy family built up the tobacco trade in south Wisconsin which primarily catered to cigar production and chewing tobacco during an era where smoking and chewing tobacco was quite common.

== The Tobacco Warehouse ==
Pomeroy's warehouse was formally erected in 1885, both Pomeroy and his business partner, Milford A. Pelton (1850-1925), were responsible for building the warehouse. The 1998 listing of the building from National Register of Historic Places database describes the building as follows:

"The warehouse is rectangular, 96' north to south and 40' east to west. It is two stories high, with a raised basement giving an additional floor of work space. It has a gable roof, and stepped brick parapets trimmed with a modest row of brick corbelling at the gable ends facing Fulton Street (north) and the tracks of the (former) Chicago, Milwaukee, St. Paul and Pacific railroad (south). A chimney rises approximately 2' above the center of the front (north) parapet from the roof, immediately behind it. Below the chimney, in the center of the parapet a stone plaque reads "1885." Mounted on the roof ridge are two large wooden cupolas with gable roofs which provide ventilation to the top floor".

The Pomeroy and Pelton building was eventually sold by William T. Pomeroy (1854-1933) to Weetman Dickinson, a local tobacco businessman from Edgerton in 1918. In total Edgerton had some 49 other tobacco warehouses within the city limits and were numbered from 1-49 according to the railroad stops which would stop to pick up tobacco for processing, the Pomeroy building was #30.

=== The Dickinson Family ===
Weetman “Weet” Dickinson (1863-1941) was a representative of eastern tobacco firms based in Edgerton. Dickinson first worked for T.B. Earle, a local dealer of tobacco whose warehouse still stands at the western end of Fulton Street in Edgerton. In 1913 Dickinson was asked to take over Earle's accounts and Dickinson eventually became the Wisconsin agent for Joseph Cullman, a New York broker who supplied to the Otto E. Eisenlohr & Brothers tobacco firm out of Pennsylvania. Dickinson renamed the warehouse to the "W. Dickinson & Sons" warehouse. Weetman's son Thomas William "Bill" Dickinson (1889-1972) eventually inherited the tobacco trade and added the "T" to the now "T.W. Dickinson & Sons" warehouse on Fulton Street. The warehouse was eventually listed on the National Register of Historic Places on July 9, 1998.

== Efforts for a Tobacco Museum ==
Since 2018 the owner of the building, Thomas Dickinson Jr., the great-grandson of Weetman Dickinson, has attempted to create the building into a museum of tobacco history, specifically in regards to Edgerton and its tobaccos industry.
