= Abner S. Flagg =

American politician

Abner S. Flagg (December 13, 1851 – September 18, 1923) was an American politician and businessman.

Born in Princeton, New Jersey, Flagg moved with his parents to Lancaster, Wisconsin, in 1854. From 1874 to 1879, Flagg lived in Yankton, Dakota Territory. Flagg then moved to Edgerton, Wisconsin, in 1879, and was in the tobacco buying business. He served on the Rock County Board of Supervisors and as mayor of Edgerton. In 1897, Flagg served in the Wisconsin State Assembly and was a Republican. Flagg died in Edgerton, Wisconsin.
