= Midnight and Jeremiah =

Book by Sterling North

- First edition (publ. J.C. Winston)
- Author: Sterling North
- Language: English
- Publisher: The John C. Winston Company
- Publication date: 1943
- LC Class: PZ7.N816 Mi

Midnight and Jeremiah (OCLC 9091853) is a 1943 children's book written by Sterling North and illustrated by Kurt Wiese. It concerns a boy named Jeremiah who adopts a black baby lamb and as the story progresses they share a strong bond. Midnight and Jeremiah was the basis for the 1948 film So Dear to My Heart, whose title was used for a revised edition, published in 1948, of the original book.

== Plot ==
Set in early 1900s Pike County, Indiana, the story starts with a boy named Jeremiah and his granny Kincaid who go into their barn where the sheep have given birth. One of the lambs is black and is rejected by its mother so Jeremiah takes him in and names him Midnight. As Midnight grows he becomes more troublesome around the house and in town. As the story progresses Midnight and Jeremiah journey side by side and bond with each other. Meanwhile, Granny Kincaid and Uncle Hiram are finding hard times getting money so Jeremiah has the idea of entering Midnight into the Pike County Fair. Jeremiah and Uncle Hiram get Midnight ready for the fair by trimming him then when they go there the judges assume that Midnight is a pure breed sheep. Granny Kincaid explains to the judges that Midnight is just a mixed breed but the judges say that it doesn't matter whether or not the sheep is pure breed so Midnight wins first place in the Pike County Fair.

After the event Uncle Hiram organises a big parade of nearly fifty neighbours to celebrate back home but it scares Midnight who runs off into the distance much to the shock of Jeremiah. Jeremiah searches everywhere but cannot find Midnight and becomes depressed as Winter comes. Granny Kincaid tries to make Jeremiah feel better by taking his mind off Midnight but it doesn't help.

On Christmas Eve Jeremiah goes off in the night to get luck on finding Midnight by going to the Baby Jesus model set. He goes off into the night to keep searching and then, at the end of the book, Jeremiah finally finds Midnight near the church asleep beyond the cradle and they both are reunited.

== Characters ==
- Jeremiah: The main protagonist of the story.
- Midnight: The black mixed breed lamb who is taken in by Jeremiah.
- Granny Kincaid: Jeremiah's grandma who in the beginning dislikes the idea of keeping Midnight.
- Uncle Hiram: Jeremiah's uncle who is a steady ally.

== Revised version ==
Subsequent to the 1948 filming of Midnight and Jeremiah as So Dear to My Heart, a revised edition of North's book was published under the film's title and with the lamb now named Danny in honor of celebrity harness horse Dan Patch: film-maker Walt Disney, who regarded Dan Patch as an icon of Americana as nostalgia, had insisted his film So Dear to My Heart open with Jeremiah encountering Dan Patch when a train transporting the horse makes a local stopover. North opened the revision of his original story with the Dan Patch episode and also incorporated other amendments from the Disney film, such as the lamb's running away occurring earlier and the episode of the county fair - where the lamb wins a special ribbon while being passed for first place - occurring almost at the story's end.

== See also ==
- So Dear to My Heart
- Sterling, John; Wiese, Kurt (1943). Midnight and Jeremiah. Philadelphia: John C. Winston Company. OCLC 1478415.
