= Saunders Creek (Wisconsin) =

Tributary of the Rock River

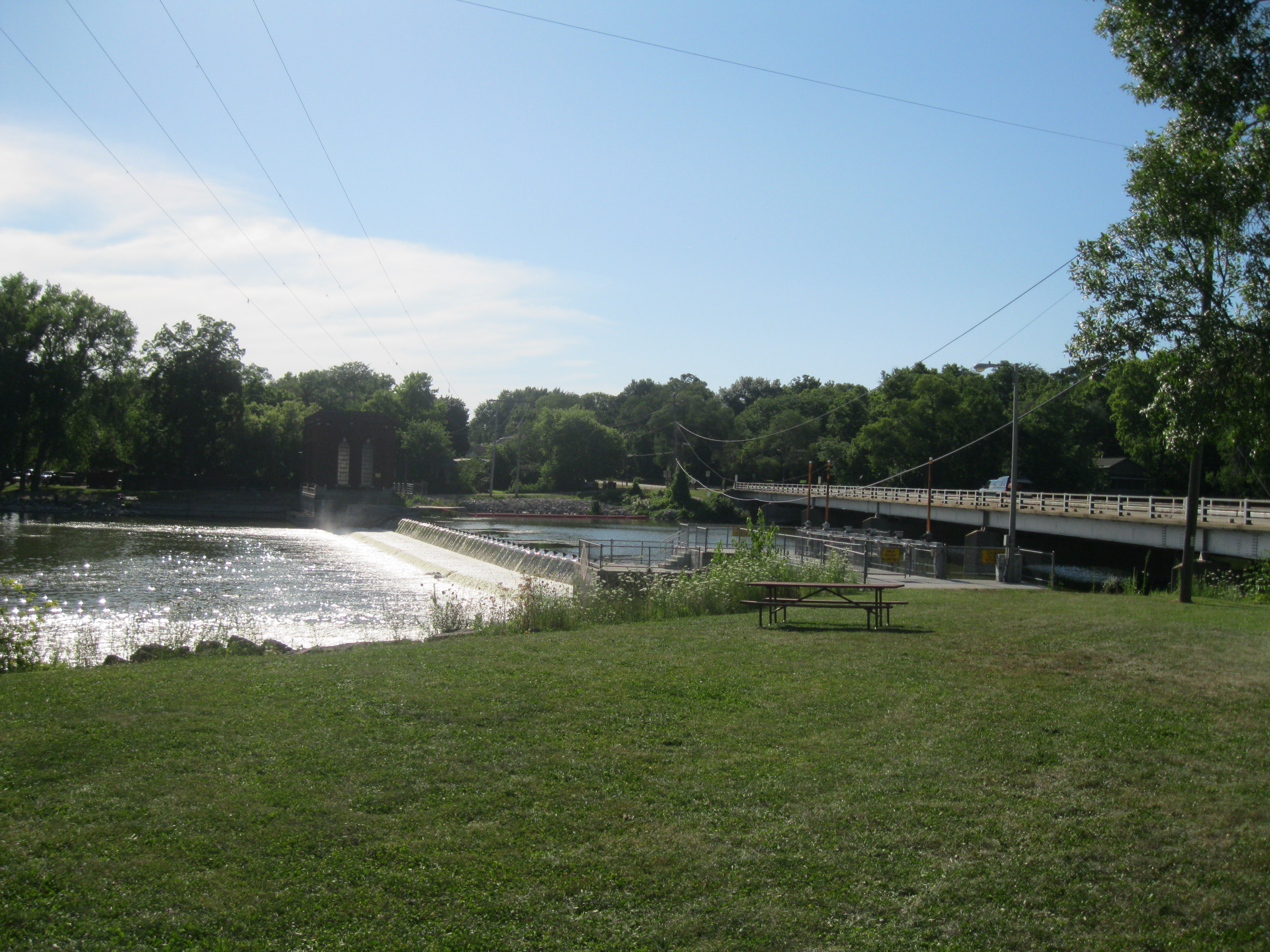
- The Rock River at Indianford, Wisconsin which Saunders Creek flows into.
- Etymology: Named after Jesse Saunders III, a local settler and landowner which the creek ran through.

Location
- Country: United States
- State: Wisconsin
- Region: Dane County, Wisconsin, Rock County, Wisconsin

Physical characteristics
- Source
  - location: Rock River
  - coordinates: 42.8150065°N 89.0651125°W
  - elevation: 778 feet (237 m)
- Mouth
  - location: Rock River (Mississippi River tributary)
  - coordinates: 42.8150065°N 89.0651125°W

Basin features
- River system: Rock River (Mississippi River tributary)
- GNIS: 1573740

Saunders Creek is a tributary of the Rock River which flows northward through both Dane County and Rock County, Wisconsin.

== History ==
Saunders Creek is a northward flowing stream located in the southeastern portion of Dane County, Wisconsin and the northern portion of Rock County, Wisconsin. The creek runs through the city of Edgerton, the township of Albion, and the city of Rockdale, Wisconsin. The creek also runs parallel with U.S. Route 51 in Wisconsin. The creek's Geographic Names Information System number is 1573740.

== Namesake ==
The creek is named after Jesse Saunders III (1789-1888), one of the many early settlers of southern Dane County, Wisconsin. Jesse Saunders came from the Saunders family, a prominent English American family which has its origins in Amersham, a town in Buckinghamshire, England. Jesse Saunders and his wife Esther Stillman Saunders (nee: Coon) (1800-1874) and their family first came to Wisconsin in 1842 from Allegany County, New York and settled the village of Albion alongside Freeborn Sweet (1810-1881), the first settler of Dane County, and Duty Jared Green (1802-1891). Much of Albion at the time were ardent Seventh Day Baptists. By 1861 Saunders owned much of the southernmost land in the village of Albion. Saunders was critical in the foundation of the Albion Academy which was operated by the Northwestern Seventh Day Baptist Association until 1894.
