= A Dangerous Man: Lawrence After Arabia =

1990 British television film

- Written by: Tim Rose Price
- Directed by: Christopher Menaul
- Starring: Ralph Fiennes; Siddig El-Fadil; Denis Quilley
- Country of origin: United Kingdom
- Original language: English

Production
- Producer: Colin Vaines
- Running time: 107 min.
- Production companies: Anglia Films; Enigma Television

Original release
- Network: ITV
- Release: 18 April 1992

A Dangerous Man: Lawrence After Arabia is a 1990 British television film depicting the experiences of T. E. Lawrence and Emir Faisal of the Hejaz at the Paris Peace Conference, after the end of the First World War. One of the conference's many concerns was determining the fates of territories formerly under the rule of the defeated Ottoman Empire. The film stars Ralph Fiennes (in his first film role) as T. E. Lawrence, Alexander Siddig (then credited as Siddig El-Fadil) as Faisal, Denis Quilley as Lord Curzon, and Nicholas Jones as Lord Dyson. It was made by Anglia Films and Enigma Television and first screened on 18 April 1992 on the ITV network, before being aired on PBS in May 1992.

The film was produced in 1990, a year after David Lean's film epic Lawrence of Arabia (1962) was re-released to cinemas. It serves as an unofficial sequel to that earlier film, as it depicts events that happened after the First World War.

The film's screenplay was written by Tim Rose Price. Christopher Menaul directed.

== Synopsis ==
The film starts with a quotation from Lawrence's 1926 book Seven Pillars of Wisdom which is used to provide the title of the film:

"All men dream: but not equally. Those who dream in the dark recesses of the night awake in the day to find all was vanity. But the dreamers of the day are dangerous men, for they may act their dreams with open eyes, and make it possible."

T. E. Lawrence is received before representatives of the British delegation, and urges them to back the claims of the Hashemites, who fought in the Arab Revolt and thus directly benefited British interests in the region but when Faisal arrives at the post-war Paris Peace Conference, 1919 to claim Syria for Arab rule, after the break-up of the Ottoman Empire, he is delayed by French diplomats, uncertain of his intentions. Lawrence joins Faisal's negotiating staff despite attempts by the French and British to exclude the Arabs altogether (The only country portrayed sympathetically is the United States, with Woodrow Wilson’s dictum to let populations decide for themselves, in terms of self-government for colonial and territorial areas).

Lawrence defends Faisal’s claim to Syria by citing previous British undertakings to Faisal’s father in a "secret letter", as well as their joint triumphant march into Damascus against the Turks. Faisal's main demand at the conference is for Syria to be governed by Arabs. France has a stake there, however, and has made previous colonial agreements with Great Britain which complicate matters.

Rebuffed in their initial attempts, Lawrence and Faisal tap into their celebrity status and return to the conference wearing traditional Arab robes thus becoming the talk of Paris. His sincere efforts on behalf of his Arab friends gain him allies, including Gertrude Bell and Winston Churchill but Lawrence's newly-gained popularity after the recent Great War poses a further complication, as popular films promote him, a white European, as the "Uncrowned King of Arabia". The wartime friendship between him and Faisal is thereby strained, most notably when the two are granted an audience with President Wilson, who is more interested in hearing of Lawrence's adventures than listening to Faisal's demands. As negotiations reach a peak, Lawrence is called away to his dying father’s bedside. He arrives too late to see his father again alive and must leave too soon to see him buried. Meanwhile, without Lawrence by his side to handle negotiations, Faisal is forced to accept a French military presence in Syria. Lawrence angrily confronts French Prime Minister Georges Clemenceau, who defends French territorial claims to Syria that date back to the Crusades. Lawrence reminds Clemenceau who it was that actually won The Crusades.

The British and French challenge the Hejaz delegation's claim to Damascus, and Lt General Sir Harry Chauvel, the Australian commander of the Desert Mounted Corps of which the 10th Australian Light Horse Regiment of the 3rd Australian Light Horse Brigade was part of his force, vouches for his regiment having been first to reach the capital and formally accepting the surrender of the city. (Lawrence in theory was the senior British adviser to Faisal's Army and under Chauvel's command-Lawrence did not see it that way.) With his cause crumbling, Lawrence beseeches the American delegation to intervene but an aide to Wilson tells Lawrence that the President has fallen ill and cannot receive him. Even in desperation, Lawrence cannot bring himself to oblige Madame Dumont, the wife of the French emissary, who propositions him. With nothing to lose, Lawrence releases information on the secret agreement between the British and French governments. He is denounced by Lord Curzon and the leaders of the British delegation as having acted like an enemy spy. Lawrence grimly observes that control of petroleum resources in the Middle East had been the primary objective of the British and French all along. Faisal and the Hejaz delegation return to Syria, where he proclaims himself king. Meanwhile, Churchill attempts to console Lawrence, promising to work with him to make things right.

A despondent Lawrence watches a newsreel showing his exploits with Faisal during the Arab Revolt. He then makes his way to see Faisal one more time. The strain in their relationship is relieved, as the two friends embrace again. Faisal expects to be deposed soon by the French, while Lawrence ruefully recalls the newsreels that dubbed him "The Uncrowned King of Arabia." Faisal laments that it is a title that suits both of them.

As newsreel footage of Lawrence and Faisal fades to white, a postscript states that after his overthrow in Syria, Faisal was installed (with help from Lawrence and Churchill) as King of Iraq, where he reigned until his death in 1933. Lawrence receded from public view and served without distinction in the British Army and the Royal Air Force before he died in a motorcycle accident less than two years after Faisal's death.

Throughout the film, Lawrence is shown writing what would become his most lasting publication, Seven Pillars of Wisdom. As in the 1962 film Lawrence of Arabia and many biographies, the film suggests that Lawrence favours relationships with men over women. Ralph Fiennes plays Lawrence as hesitant in the public eye, smiling when forced to, knowing when to be hard in his negotiations, and completely alien to the world of women.

== Cast and characters ==
- Ralph Fiennes as T. E. Lawrence
- Alexander Siddig (as Siddig El-Fadil) as Faisal
- Denis Quilley as Lord Curzon
- Nicholas Jones as Lord Dyson
- Michael Cochrane as Winston Churchill
- Gillian Barge as Gertrude Bell
- Jim Carter as Richard Meinertzhagen
- Paul Freeman as Dumont
- Polly Walker as Madame Dumont
- Robert Arden as Woodrow Wilson
- Arnold Diamond as Georges Clemenceau
- Bernard Lloyd as Lloyd George
- Roger Hammond as Valence
- Peter Copley as Maitland

== Legacy ==
The film was a significant breakthrough for both its leading performers. After seeing Fiennes' performance, Steven Spielberg went on to cast him in the role of Amon Göth in Schindler's List, for which he was brought to international attention and was nominated for the Academy Award for Best Supporting Actor. Siddig's performance caught the attention of Star Trek producer Rick Berman, who invited Siddig to audition for Star Trek: Deep Space Nine. He eventually was cast as the station's doctor, Julian Bashir.

== Awards and nominations ==
=== Awards ===
International Emmys, 1992

- Best Drama
