= Edgerton School District =

School district in Wisconsin, United States

Address
- 200 Elm High Dr Edgerton, Wisconsin, 53534; United States

District information
- Grades: PK–12
- Schools: 4
- Budget: $30 million (2021–22)
- NCES District ID: 5504110

Students and staff
- Students: 1,937 (2024–25)
- Teachers: 128.96 (on an FTE basis)
- Student–teacher ratio: 15.02

Other information
- Website: www.edgerton.k12.wi.us

Additional free text fields Edgerton School District is located in Edgerton, Wisconsin. As of 2024–25 there were about 1,900 students. Edgerton's varsity baseball team won the state championships in 1990. The volleyball team also went undefeated and won the conference championship in 2008.

== Schools ==
The district includes the following schools:

- Community Elementary School
- Yahara Valley Elementary School
- Edgerton Middle School
- Edgerton High School
