= David Blanchard =

American politician (1921–1962)

David J. Blanchard

63rd Speaker of the Wisconsin State Assembly
- In office January 7, 1961 – December 23, 1962
- Preceded by: George Molinaro
- Succeeded by: Robert D. Haase

Member of the Wisconsin State Assembly from the Rock 2nd district
- In office January 3, 1955 – December 23, 1962
- Preceded by: Burger M. Engebretson
- Succeeded by: Carolyn Blanchard

Personal details
- Born: January 5, 1921 Edgerton, Wisconsin, U.S.
- Died: December 23, 1962 (aged 41) Edgerton, Wisconsin, U.S.
- Cause of death: Uremia
- Resting place: Fassett Cemetery, Edgerton, Wisconsin
- Party: Republican
- Spouse: Carolyn Phyllis Jensen
- Parent: George W. Blanchard (father)
- Education: University of Wisconsin Law School
- Profession: lawyer

David James Blanchard (January 5, 1921 – December 23, 1962) was an American lawyer and Republican politician who served as the 63rd speaker of the Wisconsin State Assembly. His father, George Washington Blanchard, was a U.S. congressman.

== Biography ==
Blanchard was born on January 5, 1921, in Edgerton, Wisconsin. His father, George Washington Blanchard, was a member of the United States House of Representatives. Blanchard graduated from the University of Wisconsin and the University of Wisconsin Law School. He practiced law in Edgerton, Wisconsin. He married Carolyn Jensen, on September 29, 1943. Blanchard died of uremia on December 23, 1962, in Edgerton, Wisconsin.

== Career ==
Blanchard was a member of the Assembly from 1955 until his death. He became Speaker in 1961. Additionally, Blanchard was a delegate to the 1960 Republican National Convention. He was succeeded in his Assembly seat by his wife.

Wisconsin State Assembly
Preceded by Burger M. Engebretson	Member of the Wisconsin State Assembly from the Rock 2nd district January 3, 1955 – December 23, 1962	Succeeded by Carolyn Blanchard
Preceded by George Molinaro	Speaker of the Wisconsin State Assembly; January 7, 1861 – December 23, 1962	Succeeded by Robert D. Haase
