= Lewis E. Gettle =

American educator, lawyer, and politician

Lewis E. Gettle (January 28, 1863 – March 18, 1930) was an American educator, lawyer, and politician. He served in the Wisconsin State Assembly during the early 1900s.

== Biography ==
Born on a farm in Lancaster County, Pennsylvania on January 28, 1863, Gettle moved with his parents to a farm in Green County, Wisconsin sometime around 1872. After attending Carthage College in Carthage, Illinois, Gettle became a teacher and principal of schools in Evansville, Edgerton, and Juda, Wisconsin.

In 1898, Gettle received his law degree from University of Wisconsin Law School and then practiced law in Edgerton, Wisconsin.

While living in Edgerton, Gettle served on the Rock County board of supervisors and was chair of the board. He also served on the Edgerton school board and library board and ultimately became president of both boards.

In 1911, Gettle served in the Wisconsin State Assembly as a Republican. Later, Gettle worked for Robert M. La Follette, Sr. when he was Governor of Wisconsin. Later, he practiced law in Janesville and then in 1915, moved to Madison, Wisconsin.

In 1921, Gettle was appointed to the Wisconsin Railroad Commission and was chairman of the railroad commission at the time of his death.

== Death ==
Gettle died in Madison, Wisconsin on March 18, 1930.
