= Sterling North =

American writer

- Born: Thomas Sterling North; November 4, 1906; Edgerton, Wisconsin, U.S.
- Died: December 21, 1974 (aged 68); Whippany, New Jersey, U.S.
- Occupations: Writer, literary critic
- Children: Arielle North Olson
- Relatives: Jessica Nelson North (sister), Justus Henry Nelson (uncle)
- Writing career
- Genres: Novels, children's books
- Notable work: Rascal

Thomas Sterling North (November 4, 1906 – December 21, 1974) was an American writer. He is best known for the children's book Rascal, a bestseller in 1963.

== Biography ==
=== Early life and family ===
North's maternal grandparents, James Hervey Nelson and Sarah Orelup Nelson, were Wisconsin pioneers. Born in Putnam County, New York, James moved first to near Rochester, New York, then to Menomonee Falls, in Waukesha County, Wisconsin (near Milwaukee), then pioneered a farm near present-day South Wayne, in southwestern Wisconsin. His daughter, Sarah Elizabeth Nelson, was Sterling North's mother. She married David Willard North, also the product of a pioneering local family, whose brother ran the family farm. Sarah died of pneumonia when Sterling was seven years old.

North was born on the second floor of a farmhouse on the shores of Lake Koshkonong, a few miles from Edgerton, Wisconsin, in 1906. Surviving a near-paralyzing struggle with polio in his teens, he grew to young adulthood in the quiet southern Wisconsin village of Edgerton, which North transformed into the "Brailsford Junction" setting of several of his books.

North had three siblings: two sisters, Jessica Nelson North who was an author, poet, and editor; Theo (Theodora), who was the martinet in the family; and a brother, Herschel, who survived World War I.

When Sterling North was 11 (in 1917, which would have been the year of his maternal grandfather's 100th birthday), several of his uncles wrote extended biographies about their parents and their pioneer farm life. One of these uncles was Justus Henry Nelson, an early missionary in the Amazon Basin. This writing effort was at the same time as the setting of Rascal and may have been an early literary inspiration to North.

=== Writing career ===
After attending the University of Chicago, North worked as a reporter for the Chicago Daily News, the New York World-Telegram, and the New York Sun, before becoming a full-time freelance writer.

In 1940, in his position as Chicago Daily News literary editor, North was one of the first public figures to denounce the newly popular medium of comic books. Barely two years after the introduction of Superman, North wrote that comics were "a poisonous mushroom growth of the last two years" and that comic book publishers were "guilty of a cultural slaughter of the innocents".

One of North's first books, The Pedro Gorino, published in 1929, was a narrative of the life of Harry Dean, an African-American sea captain. A 1934 North novel, Plowing on Sunday, featured a rare dust jacket illustration by Iowa artist Grant Wood.

North's book Midnight and Jeremiah was made into the Disney movie So Dear to My Heart in 1949. The film was nominated for the Academy Award for Best Original Song for Burl Ives's version of the 17th century English song "Lavender Blue". In addition, North wrote Abe Lincoln: Log Cabin to White House, The Wolfling: A Documentary Novel of the Eighteen-Seventies, Raccoons are the Brightest People, Hurry Spring, and many other books.

In 1956, he became the general editor of Houghton Mifflin's North Star Books. This firm published biographies of American heroes for young adult readers. Although uncredited, North's wife, Gladys Buchanan North, also contributed to the editing process.

==== Rascal ====
North's best-selling and best-known work, Rascal: A Memoir of a Better Era, was published by E. P. Dutton in August 1963. It is a remembrance of a year in his childhood when he raised a baby raccoon, which he named "Rascal". It received a Newbery Honor in 1964, a Sequoyah Book Award in 1966, and a Young Reader's Choice Award in 1966. It was made into the Disney film of the same name in 1969. Additionally, it was made into a 52-episode Japanese anime entitled Araiguma Rasukaru in 1977. The success of the anime was responsible for the introduction of the North American raccoon into Japan.

In addition to chronicling North's raising of a raccoon, Rascal also highlights his loving relationship with his attorney father, dreamer David Willard North, and the aching loss represented by the death of his mother, Elizabeth Nelson North.

== Legacy ==
=== Sterling North Home and Museum ===
- Sterling North House
- U.S. National Register of Historic Places
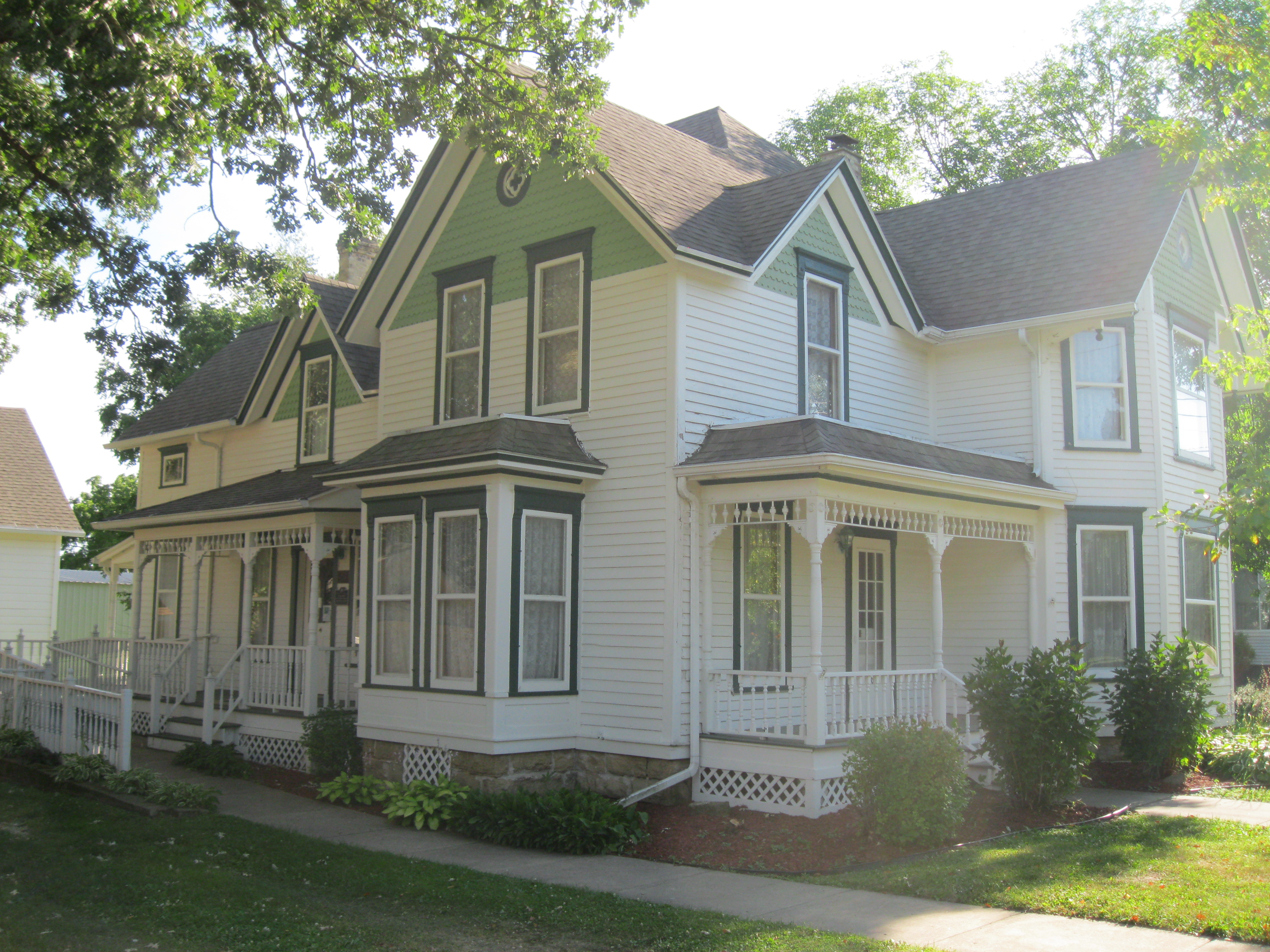

- Location within Wisconsin
- Location: 409 W. Rollin St., Edgerton, Wisconsin
- Coordinates: 42°50′14″N 89°4′4″W
- Area: less than one acre
- Built: 1894
- Architectural style: Queen Anne
- NRHP reference No.: 96001579
- Added to NRHP: January 9, 1997

The house where Sterling spent his later childhood, also the setting for much of Rascal, still stands. It has been restored to its 1917 state and opened to the public.

The house was built in 1894 by Sterling's grandfather Thomas North Jr. when he retired from farming and moved in to Edgerton. It is a rambling 2-story house in a modest version of the Queen Anne style that was popular in 1894. Hallmarks of the style seen in this house are the complex roof, bay windows, the asymmetric front porch decorated with spindle work, and the shingles in the gable ends.

Sterling's grandfather died in 1913, and his mother died of pneumonia the same year. By 1918, when Sterling was twelve, he and his father were living in this house at 409 W. Rollin St., and the stage was set for many of the situations that he would eventually form into the book Rascal. Sterling left the house in 1925 when he graduated from high school.

After the Norths left, the house served as a boarding house, mainly for teachers. Later it was converted to two apartments, and the weatherboard siding was covered by more modern asbestos siding.

In the 1990s the Sterling North Society bought the house. They removed the asbestos siding and restored the house to its 1917 appearance, making it a museum. A bronze sign in front of the home, marking North's significance in the history of this southern Wisconsin community, was dedicated in October 1984. Money for the sign was donated by the school children of Rock County, the Edgerton Area Chamber of Commerce, and friends of Sterling North.

=== Centennial commemoration ===
North's hometown of Edgerton celebrated his 100th birthday during a book festival October 21 and 22, 2006. Journalist Helen Thomas, children's book author Kevin Henkes, Bill Clinton and Vince Lombardi biographer David Maraniss, Wisconsin writer and volunteer firefighter Michael Perry, and North's daughter and children's book author Arielle North Olson appeared. Since then, there have been annual book festivals held in Edgerton honoring the memory of Sterling North.

== Death ==
North died in Whippany, New Jersey, on December 21, 1974, at the age of 68.
