= Colin Vaines =

British film and television producer

Colin Vaines is a British film and Emmy-winning television producer and creative consultant whose credits include The Unforgivable, starring Sandra Bullock, Film Stars Don't Die in Liverpool, Gangs of New York, Coriolanus, The Young Victoria, and The Rum Diary.

== Early career ==
Colin Vaines began his career in the film industry in 1977 as a journalist with the trade paper Screen International, which he went on to edit. In 1984, he left journalism to run the UK's National Film Development Fund, and act as consultant to parent body British Screen Finance. In 1987, he oversaw UK development for Columbia Pictures during David Puttnam's tenure at the studio, subsequently becoming head of development for Puttnam's own production company, Enigma, working on films including Memphis Belle. He made his debut as a producer in 1992 with the Emmy-winning TV film A Dangerous Man: Lawrence After Arabia, which introduced Ralph Fiennes in the title role.

During this time, in addition to developing projects as an independent producer, Vaines was artistic director of both the Performing Arts Screenwriting Lab in the UK, and the writers' lab SCRAWL in South Africa. Among the writers he handpicked to develop their projects at these workshops were Simon Beaufoy, who went on to write The Full Monty, John Hodge, who went on to write Trainspotting, Lee Hall, who went on to write Billy Elliot, Paul Laverty, who went on to write many films for Ken Loach including Cannes Palme d'Or winner The Wind that shakes the barley, and John Michael McDonagh, who went on to write and direct The Guard.

After co-producing Michael Radford's B. Monkey, Vaines supervised production and development for UK lottery franchise The Film Consortium from 1997 to 1999, overseeing movies including Hideous Kinky, starring Kate Winslet.

== 1999–2010: Miramax Films, The Weinstein Company, GK Films ==
In 1999, he was appointed Executive Vice-President, Development for New York-based Miramax Films, becoming Executive Vice-President, European Production and Development in 2002. He was co-executive producer of Martin Scorsese's Gangs of New York, and Executive in Charge of Production on Anthony Minghella's Cold Mountain.

He was an executive producer of Anthony Minghella's Breaking and Entering, starring Jude Law, and Chris Noonan's Miss Potter, starring Renée Zellweger. He also developed and oversaw production on numerous projects for The Weinstein Company, including The Reader, Factory Girl and Minghella's final film for television, The No. 1 Ladies' Detective Agency.

He joined Graham King's GK Films in Los Angeles as Co-President of Production in 2007, where he became Executive Producer of The Young Victoria, The Rum Diary, starring Johnny Depp, and London Boulevard, the directing debut of Oscar-winning writer William Monahan, starring Keira Knightley and Colin Farrell.

== 2010–present: freelance production and creative development consultancy ==
Returning to freelance production in 2010, Vaines produced Coriolanus, which marked the directing debut of its star, Ralph Fiennes, twenty years after Vaines and Fiennes first worked together on A Dangerous Man. The film also stars Gerard Butler and Vanessa Redgrave, who won best supporting actress at the 2011 British Independent Film Awards for her role in the movie. It received its European premiere at the 2011 Berlin Film Festival, and its North American premiere at the 2011 Toronto Film Festival.

Vaines was co-producer of WE, the directing debut of Madonna, which stars Abbie Cornish, Andrea Riseborough, Oscar Isaac, and James D'Arcy.The film was premiered at the 2011 Venice Film Festival, and had its North American premiere at the 2011 Toronto Film Festival. He was a co-executive producer of My Week With Marilyn, starring Michelle Williams and Kenneth Branagh, both of whom were Oscar-nominated for their performances.

In 2015, he produced The Marriage of Reason and Squalor, directed by Turner-nominated artist Jake Chapman, and starring Rhys Ifans and Sophie Kennedy Clark. Written by Brock Norman Brock from the book by Jake Chapman, this surreal take on romance novels was financed largely by Sky Arts, who transmitted a four-part version. A feature version for the international theatrical market premiered at the Edinburgh International Film Festival.

He was an executive producer of Red Dog: True Blue, the prequel to the hugely successful Australian movie Red Dog. The film, which stars Jason Isaacs and Levi Miller, opened in Australia through Village Roadshow on Boxing Day 2016.

Film Stars Don't Die in Liverpool was released in 2017. Directed by Paul McGuigan, the movie stars Annette Bening, Jamie Bell, Kenneth Cranham, Stephen Graham, Vanessa Redgrave and Julie Walters, and is produced by Vaines and Bond producer Barbara Broccoli. Matt Greenhalgh wrote the screenplay, from the book by Peter Turner. The film, which premiered to critical acclaim at the 2017 Telluride Film Festival and went on to screen at the Toronto and London film festivals, was released through Sony Classics in North America, and Lionsgate in the UK. The film was nominated for three British Academy awards: best actress, best actor, and best adapted screenplay.

Koko: A Red Dog Story, the latest in the Red Dog saga, on which Vaines is an executive producer, was released in Australian cinemas and on demand at the end of 2019.

In 2021, Vaines was executive producer of The Unforgivable for Netflix, starring Sandra Bullock. Based on the British mini-series Unforgiven by Sally Wainwright, it was written by Peter Craig, Hillary Seitz, and Courtenay Miles and directed by Nora Fingsheidt. The film was a massive hit for Netflix, taking the number one spot worldwide just 24 hours after it was released, and becoming one of Netflix's all time top ten films just three weeks later.

In 2022, he was executive producer of Doctor Who Am I, a documentary by Matthew Jacobs and Vanessa Yuille about fandom and the controversial 1996 Doctor Who movie which Matthew Jacobs wrote and which featured Paul McGann as the Eighth Doctor. The film had its premiere at the Sci-Fi London festival in May 2022, where it won the audience award, and went on to play successfully at film festivals and conventions around the world. It received its US premiere in March 2023.

Vaines is executive producer of Branded (2024), the feature debut of artist Pauline Amos, who wrote, directed and performs in the film.

He is producer with Lee Brazier on The Beauty of Sharks, a thriller set in Italy written by Rob Green and to be directed by Peter Chelsom.

With Julia Taylor-Stanley, he is executive producer of Faithfull, a biography of the iconic singer Marianne Faithfull.

Other current projects include Honourable, a contemporary British TV drama with writer Brock Norman Brock, and a major international drama series with acclaimed writer James Graham.

A founder member with musician Tim Arnold and actors Stephen Fry and Benedict Cumberbatch of the lobbying group Save Soho, he has contributed articles on Soho issues to The Huffington Post and The Observer newspaper.
