= So Dear to My Heart =

1948 film by Walt Disney

- Theatrical release poster
- Directed by: Harold D. Schuster; Hamilton Luske
- Screenplay by: John Tucker Battle
- Adaptation by: Maurice Rapf; Ted Sears
- Based on: Midnight and Jeremiah by Sterling North
- Produced by: Walt Disney
- Starring: Burl Ives; Beulah Bondi; Harry Carey; Luana Patten; Bobby Driscoll
- Cinematography: Winton C. Hoch
- Edited by: Lloyd L. Richardson
- Music by: Paul Smith
- Production company: Walt Disney Productions
- Distributed by: RKO Radio Pictures
- Release dates: November 29, 1948 (Chicago); January 19, 1949 (Indianapolis)
- Running time: 82 minutes
- Country: United States
- Language: English
- Budget: $1.5 million
- Box office: $3.7 million (U.S. rental) + $575,000 (foreign rental)

So Dear to My Heart is a 1948 American musical drama film produced by Walt Disney and released by RKO Radio Pictures. Its world premiere was in Chicago, Illinois, on November 29, 1948. Like 1946's Song of the South, the film combines animation and live action. It is based on the 1943 Sterling North book Midnight and Jeremiah. The book was revised by North to parallel the film's storyline amendments and then re-issued under the same title as the film.

The film was a personal favorite of Walt Disney, since it re-created on film one of the most memorable times of his life, growing up on a small farm in the American Midwest at the turn of the twentieth century. Walt said: "So Dear was especially close to me. Why, that's the life my brother and I grew up with as kids out in Missouri". Walt had intended that this would be the first all live-action Disney feature film, but his distributor, RKO, convinced him that when audiences saw the word "Disney", they expected animation. Thus they split the difference.

So Dear to My Heart was the final film appearance of Harry Carey.

== Plot ==
In 1903, in the fictional town of Fulton Corners, Pike County, Indiana, young Jeremiah Kincaid lives with his Granny on her homestead. Jeremiah idolizes the race horse Dan Patch and dreams of owning and raising a similar champion horse. These dreams change when Granny's sheep have new lambs, including a black-wool lamb whose mother rejects him. Taking pity on him, Jeremiah convinces Granny to allow him to keep the lamb as a pet, who he names Danny after the horse. A Wise Old Owl who features in cards that Jeremiah keeps in his scrapbook advises Danny that "it's what you do with what you've got that counts"; using the story of when David defeated Goliath, and the story of when Joshua blasts down the Walls of Jericho; encouraging him to strive for greatness despite his black wool being a disadvantage.

Danny soon becomes a nuisance, underfoot and destructive in nature. To Granny's consternation, Jeremiah begins neglecting his chores and becomes single-mindedly preoccupied with Danny. With the encouragement of his Uncle Hiram and friend Tildy, Jeremiah becomes determined to enter Danny at the Pike County Fair and win a blue ribbon. After a particularly destructive rampage, Granny resolves to get rid of Danny, but cannot bring herself to do it seeing how Jeremiah cares for him.

Uncle Hiram attempts to broach the subject of the County Fair to Granny, but Granny refuses on financial grounds. The Wise Old Owl instructs Jeremiah to persevere, with the stories of Christopher Columbus and Robert the Bruce illustrating "stick-to-it-ivity". Eager to make money to change Granny's mind, Jeremiah and Tildy go looking for scarce wild honey to sell to the general store. Their search takes them into a swamp, where they find a tree swarming with bees, which yields enough honey to fill two tubs' worth, earning Jeremiah a considerable amount of money. Upon returning home, Hiram and Jeremiah learn from Granny that Tildy and Danny have gone missing. Jeremiah runs after Danny, and Tildy returns shortly after. When Jeremiah does not return home before dark, Granny goes out into a storm to look for him, bringing him home without Danny over his protests. When Granny advises Jeremiah that Danny is in God's hands, Jeremiah protests that God cannot take Danny away from him. Granny scolds Jeremiah for becoming selfish and fixated on the prizes Danny can win over genuine love for him.

Jeremiah sets out early the next morning and finds Danny. Jeremiah reveals to Granny that he prayed and promised God that if He let him find Danny, he would give up his vain dreams. Granny, seeing that Jeremiah has learned his lesson, tells a white lie that she promised God that if He let Jeremiah find Danny, they could go to the fair, reasoning that since she has known God longer, he will be all right with her promise taking precedent.

At the fair, Granny advises Jeremiah to accept loss as gracefully as victory. Jeremiah falters slightly when showing Danny, overwhelmed at the high pedigrees of the competition, and Danny causes slight embarrassment by ramming into one of the judges, though the judge is more impressed than offended. Jeremiah is dismayed when another sheep wins the blue ribbon, but maintains his dignity. The judge Danny rammed compliments Jeremiah and Danny, telling the crowd that Danny is in a class of his own, echoing the Owl's advice "it's what you do with what you've got that counts", and awards Jeremiah and Danny a special award. The family returns to Fulton Corners to the admiration of the community, with Danny now accepted and celebrated.

== Cast ==
- Bobby Driscoll as Jeremiah "Jerry" Kincaid
- Luana Patten as Tildy
- Burl Ives as Uncle Hiram Douglas
- Beulah Bondi as Granny Kincaid
- Harry Carey as Head Judge at County Fair
- Raymond Bond as Pete Grundy, Storekeeper
- Walter Soderling as Grampa Meeker
- Matt Willis as Mr. Burns, Horse Trainer
- Spelman B. Collins as Judge
- Bob Haymes as Singer Bob Haymes

=== Voices ===
- John Beal as Adult Jeremiah/Narrator
- Ken Carson as The Owl
- Bob Stanton as Danny
- Marion Darlington as Whistling Sound Effects
- Thurl Ravenscroft as the Bull, Robert Bruce
- Clarence Nash as Vocal Sound Effects
- The Rhythmaires as Vocal Ensemble/Bluebirds

== Awards and honors ==
The film was nominated for the Academy Award for Best Original Song for Burl Ives's version of the 17th-century English folk song "Lavender Blue", but lost to "Baby, It's Cold Outside" from Neptune's Daughter.

Bobby Driscoll received a special Juvenile Award from the Academy, honoring him as "the outstanding juvenile actor of 1949". In addition to So Dear to My Heart, he had garnered critical acclaim for his dramatic performance in the RKO melodrama The Window.

The film is recognized by American Film Institute in this list:

- 2004: AFI's 100 Years...100 Songs:
  - "Lavender Blue" – Nominated

== Production ==
The train depot in the film was later relocated to Ward Kimball's Grizzly Flats Railroad in his backyard. After the railroad closed, John Lasseter relocated it to the Justi Creek Railway.

== Critical response ==
Film critic Bosley Crowther wrote on The New York Times that "a little aphoristic fantasy (…) has the imagination and special charm which the film, in general, lacks. For, with all its innocence and simplicity, which are commendable on the modern screen, So Dear to My Heart is not distinguished by its story or cinematic style. It is just a pleasant fiction for the kiddies who fancy lively pets and for the oldsters who like to vision childhood in an illusory, kerosene-lamp glow."

== Release ==
The film returned rentals to RKO by 1951 of $2,775,000 with $2,200,000 being generated in the U.S. and Canada.

The film was re-released in 1964 and earned an estimated $1.5 million in rentals in the U.S. and Canada.

So Dear to My Heart was released on home video in 1986. It was then re-released in 1992 and released on video in 1994 as part of the Walt Disney Masterpiece Collection. The film was originally planned for a US DVD release as part of the Walt Disney Gold Classic Collection, but was cancelled, with no particular reason given. Six years after seeing a region 2 DVD release, it was released in the US on DVD in July 2008 as a Disney Movie Club Exclusive.

In Italy, So Dear to My Heart was released on home video in 1997. It was re-released on DVD format in 2003.

As of April 2025, it is one of the few Disney movies that is not available for streaming on Disney+.

== See also ==
- 1948 in film
- List of American films of 1948
- List of Walt Disney Pictures films
- List of films with live action and animation
