= More Bones: Scary Stories From Around The World =

Children's Book and Scary Story Collection

- Author: Arielle North Olson, Howard Schwartz
- Cover artist: E. M. Gist
- Language: English
- Genre: Childrens
- Publication date: 2008

More Bones: Scary Stories From Around The World is a 2008 book of children's short stories from around the world. The stories were selected and retold by Arielle North Olson and Howard Schwartz, with illustrations by E.M. Gist.

It has been reviewed by Kirkus Reviews.
