= Rascal (book) =

1963 children's book by Sterling North

- First edition
- Author: Sterling North
- Illustrator: John Schoenherr
- Language: English
- Genre: Memoir, Children's literature
- Publisher: E. P. Dutton
- Publication date: August 5, 1963
- Publication place: United States
- Media type: Print (Hardcover)
- Pages: 189

Rascal: A Memoir of a Better Era, often referred to as Rascal, is a 1963 children's book by Sterling North about his childhood in Wisconsin, illustrated by John Schoenherr.

== Publication ==
Rascal was published on August 5, 1963 by Dutton Children's Books. The book is a remembrance of a year in the author's childhood during which he raised a baby raccoon named "Rascal".

== Summary ==
Subtitled "A Memoir of a Better Era", North's book is about being young and having a pet raccoon. Rascal chronicles young Sterling's loving yet distant relationship with his father, dreamer David Willard North, and the aching loss represented by the death of Sterling's mother, Elizabeth Nelson North. The book also touches on young Sterling's concerns for his older brother Herschel, off fighting in World War I in Europe. The boy reconnects with society through the unlikely intervention of his pet raccoon, a "ringtailed wonder" charmer. The book begins with the capture of the baby raccoon and follows his growth to a yearling.

The story is also a personal chronicle of the era of change between the (nearly) untouched forest wilderness and agriculture; between the days of the pioneers and the rise of towns; and between horse-drawn transportation and automobiles, among other transitions. The author recounts through the eyes of himself as a boy his observations during expeditions in and around his hometown, contrasted with his father's reminiscences of the time "when Wisconsin was still half wilderness when panthers sometimes looked in through the windows, and the whippoorwills called all night long", provide a glimpse of the past, as the original subtitle suggests.

The book has humorous moments. His sister Theo cannot understand Sterling's building of a canoe in the living room and is "startled nearly out of her wits" when Rascal, who had been lying on and blending into Uncle Justus' Amazonian jaguar rug, stands up. Later in the book, Rascal joins him in a pie-eating contest, and they win but are partially disqualified, although his friend, Oscar Sunderland, takes first prize because of it. Rascal also enjoyed riding in his bicycle's basket and helped him sell magazines

The book also has serious moments. The author's brother, Herschel, is serving in the military during World War I, and Sterling longs for a word from him. Rascal is confined after he bites Slammy Stillman for snapping him with a rubber band. Later, Sterling catches a mild case of the Spanish flu during the epidemic. The book states his Aunt Lillie, caring for him during his sickness, said Sterling's mother had wanted him to be a writer, which he achieved.

Eventually, the problems with Rascal's raids into fields and henhouses become too much; the neighbors' irritation with the boy's pet can no longer be ignored, and Rascal runs the constant peril of being shot. Also, Rascal has become a young adult and, as such, is getting attention from jealous male and interested female raccoons. Sterling travels for hours in the newly completed canoe to release Rascal in the woods at the far side of nearby Lake Koshkonong. One of his biggest regrets is that his brother Herschel won't be back in time to see his pet.

The author's sister, poet and art historian Jessica Nelson North, wasn't particularly pleased with how her brother portrayed her family in Rascal (but was proud of her brother's achievement, regardless).

== Awards ==
- Dutton Animal Book Award – 1963
- Newbery Honor – 1964
- Lewis Carroll Shelf Award – 1964
- Dorothy Canfield Fisher Children's Book Award – 1965
- Sequoyah Book Award – 1966
- William Allen White Children's Book Award – 1966
- Pacific Northwest Library Association Young Reader's Choice Award – 1966

== Derivative works ==
In 1965 North published Little Rascal, an abridged children's book version illustrated by Carl Burger.

The book was made into the Disney film Rascal in 1969 starring Bill Mumy as Sterling North. The film also featured the voice of Walter Pidgeon as the reminiscing grown Sterling North, Steve Forrest as his father Willard, and Pamela Toll as his sister Theo.

It was also made into a 52-episode Japanese anime entitled Araiguma Rasukaru. The success of the animated series was responsible for the accidental introduction of the raccoon into Japan.

== The Sterling North Museum and book locations ==
The setting of the book, their childhood home in Edgerton, Wisconsin (known as Brailsford Junction in the book), is preserved as a museum. The author's daughter, Arielle North Olson, a respected children's author in her own right, is an honorary director of the museum. Rascal-related items at the museum include the high chair where Rascal tried to eat the sugar cube, the barn where Rascal's entrance hole has been patched, the oak tree where Rascal stayed, Sterling's scratched sentiment of "Damn Kaiser Bill" on the barn (his brother was serving in WWI), Sterling's initials painted inside the garage with the same green paint that went on his canoe, and a recreation of the chicken wire screen protecting their Christmas tree.

Other nearby locations mentioned in the book are Lake Koshkonong, the Rock River, and the Indianford dam.

== Okazaki retrospective ==
In 2008, the Okazaki World Children's Art Museum in Japan created an exhibition entitled "A Retrospective Rascal". 50,000 people toured the display, timed to correspond to Sterling's 100th birthday and the 30th anniversary of the anime, Araiguma Rasukaru, based on the book. The canoe paddle was specially sent to Japan to be the exhibit's centerpiece. Many other items borrowed from individuals in the Edgerton area were displayed.
