= Justus Henry Nelson =

American missionary (1850–1937)

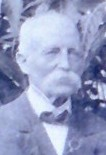
Justus Henry Nelson in South America in 1920

Justus Henry Nelson (December 22, 1850 – February 6, 1937) established the first Protestant church in the Amazon basin and was a self-supporting Methodist missionary in Belém, Pará, Brazil for 45 years.

== Early years ==
Justus was born December 22, 1850, in Menomonee Falls, Wisconsin, near modern-day Milwaukee, Wisconsin. His parents, James Hervey Nelson and Sarah Orelup Nelson were Wisconsin pioneers, later establishing an early farm in South Wayne, Wisconsin, near the Illinois border. He was the second of nine children, the first six of which were boys, followed by three girls.

== Education ==
At 18, he attended Evansville Seminary for six months. He finally was able to attend Lawrence University for five years when he was 21, graduating with a B.A. It was there that he decided to be a preacher.

He "studied Theology for four years at Boston University by borrowing $120 from Cousin Nelson Ladue and earned the rest preaching." He received a S.T.B. degree from the Boston University School of Theology.

He also studied "for two years at the Boston University School of Medicine to prepare himself to meet some of the emergencies he would inevitably be called on to alleviate."

== Marriage ==
While Justus was studying in Boston, he met Miss Fannie Bishop Capen, who had been born in Stoughton, Massachusetts, in 1852. Her father's family had roots in Holland and France, and her mother's family had early New England roots. His family had been in New York for five generations before his parents moved to Wisconsin. She was working as a matron in an orphanage. They married on April 13, 1880, in Stoughton, Massachusetts.

== Becoming missionaries ==
Justus had learned that Bishop William Taylor was establishing self-supporting missions in Africa and South America in the late 1870s. This seemed "not only a challenge but a definite call". Not long after Justus and Fannie married, they left for Belém, Pará, Brazil, which is on the southern edge of the mouth of the Amazon River.

=== Trip to Brazil and tragedy ===
Justus and Fannie arrived in Pará on June 19, 1880, along with Bishop Taylor. They established a school for boys. Additional missionaries were needed to help with their teaching. William Taylor sent Justus' brothers John & Willet, Willet's bride - Hattie Batchelder (Nelson), and Miss Clare Blunt. Shortly thereafter, their school building burned down and two of the group, John Nelson and Hattie Batchelder (Nelson) died of Yellow Fever. Fannie became ill with Yellow Fever but survived. This double tragedy caused the school to be closed.

== Self-supporting missionaries ==
They became self-supporting missionaries. Justus remained in Brazil for forty-five years, only returning three times. Fannie spent a large amount of time in Brazil but returned to the Boston area when it was time for their children's education.

=== First Protestant Church in Amazonia ===
On July 1, 1883, he established the first Protestant church in the Amazon Basin - the Igreja Metodista Episcopal no Pará (Methodist Episcopal Church of Pará). It was located on the Rua dos Martires (current Rua 28 de Setembro, 28 September Street), near the corner of the Av. 15 of August (the current Av. President Vargas).

=== Publication of O Apologista Christão Brazileiro ===
He published and personally printed a newsletter for many years entitled O Apoligista Christão Brazileiro (The Brazilian Christian Advocate). It was launched on January 4, 1890. The motto of the paper (as well as his personal motto) was "Saibamos e pratiquemos a verdade custe o que custar." "Let us know the truth and practice it, no matter the cost."

This publication included Sunday School lessons, religious articles, and other items of interest. It called attention to fighting idolatry, masonry, gambling, alcohol, tobacco, and native spiritualism. The periodical also spread the ideals of representative democracy and republicanism in Brazil, defending the separation of church and state, elections, and advances in education.

=== Arrest ===
In an early issue, he printed items that were inflammatory to the local Catholic officials. These officials had enough control over the local government to have him arrested. He was tried and sentenced to four weeks but served four months. While he was imprisoned, his wife Fannie took him his meals out of fear that he would be poisoned.

=== Medical service ===
His "medical training proved to be of value in his mission work, mostly in obstetrics, minor surgery and treatment of skin diseases such as boils and ulcers. No record remains of the number of childbirths at which the father officiated. He was called upon for this part of his mission work at any hour of day or night. ... Along with his medical work, he also pulled a great many teeth. One year, by actual count he pulled over 5000 teeth."

=== Song translation ===
Justus translated a number of religious songs into Portuguese. Nine of these translations are in the modern Portuguese Methodist hymnal Hinário Evangélico. Included in these are Ao contemplar a rude cruz (When I Survey the Wonderous Cross), Fonte és Tu de toda bênção (You Are the Source of All Blessing), Prece ao Trino Deus, Saudai o nome de Jesus (All Hail the Power of Jesus’ Name), Presença Divina, Contemplação, Reino Universal, Ebenézer, Rei Excelso, and Coroai.

Justus' translation of Coroai was recorded in 1998 by Marina de Oliveira on her CD Momentos - vol.2. His translation of Lino Dos Vales was recorded in 2003 by João Inácio and Ranúzia in 2003 on their album Grata Memória.

== Family ==
They had five children in Belém, one of which died of malaria. Three of their children, William "Will", Luther, and Sarah Louise "Louise" graduated from Boston University. Their youngest daughter Elizabeth "Bess" graduated from Reed College. Luther graduated from Harvard Medical School and practiced medicine in Portland, Oregon. Louise received a second degree from Oregon State University, taught at Modesto Junior College, and married entomologist Charles E. Woodworth. Justus presided over their 1926 Berkeley, California, wedding.

== His devotion to service and retirement ==
His son wrote: "His relatives and friends would write and ask him from time to time why he didn't take some time off and come home for a vacation. his answer would be 'I'm having a perpetual picnic here. Why take a vacation?'. His ambition was to finish out a half century of service on the mission field, but times were hard and it became more and more difficult to earn a living besides supporting a mission, so he was forced to retire in 1925 at age 75 even though he was vigorous physically and active mentally."

=== Later years ===
He retired to Portland, Oregon, living near his son Luther. While there he continued printing for two local churches as well as a monthly periodical for the Anti Liquor League, all gratis. He died in Portland of viral pneumonia at age 86 on February 6, 1937.

== Mention in Rascal ==
In 1917, which would have been the year of his father James Hervey Nelson's 100th birthday, Justus and two of his brothers wrote extended biographies about their parents and their pioneer farm life in Wisconsin. These biographies may have served as literary inspiration to his nephew Sterling North.

Justus is mentioned in the award-winning children's book Rascal that was written by Sterling North in 1963 about the author's memories of 1918.

"His [Rascal's] virtual invisibility was due to the fact that he was lying on a large Jaguar-skin rug which Uncle Justus had sent us from Para, Brazil. The mounted head had realistic glass eyes which Rascal often fondled and sometimes tried to dislodge. The little raccoon blended perfectly in the handsomely marked pelt of the once-ferocious jungle cat."

"When Rascal began to rise from that skin, like the disembodied spirit of the Amazonian jaguar, it startled Theo nearly out of her wits."

Also mentioned in the book was Justus' niece, poet, and editor Jessica Nelson North.
