= Jessica Nelson North =

American author, poet and editor

- Born: September 7, 1891; Madison, Wisconsin
- Died: June 3, 1988 (aged 96); Downers Grove, Illinois
- Education: Lawrence College, University of Chicago
- Occupation: Author
- Relatives: Sterling North (brother), Arielle North Olson (niece), Justus Henry Nelson (uncle)

Jessica Nelson North (September 7, 1891 – June 3, 1988) was an American writer, poet and editor.

== Early life and family ==
Jessica Nelson North was born in Madison, Wisconsin, the daughter of David Willard North and Sarah Elizabeth "Elizabeth" (Nelson) North. She grew up on the shore of Lake Koshkonong near to what later became St. Joseph's College in the vicinity of Edgerton, Wisconsin. She was the older sister of Sterling North, author of Rascal and many other children's books. Jessica Nelson North is one of the major characters portrayed in her brother's well-known book, which was set when she was 25. Jessica and Sterling's family home (the setting of Rascal) in Edgerton has been restored to its 1917 setting and is open as a museum. Sterling North recalled (in Rascal, Chapter 2) that "Both sisters had taken tender care of me after Mother died, Jessica in particular, postponing her career and marriage."

Jessica's grandparents, James Hervey Nelson and Sarah Orelup Nelson, were Wisconsin pioneers. In 1917, which would have been her grandfather James Hervey Nelson's 100th birthday, several of North's uncles wrote extended biographies about their parents and their pioneer farm life. These writing efforts may have been a literary inspiration to both her and Sterling.

Jessica was the aunt of author Arielle North Olson who was Sterling's daughter. Jessica was also the niece of Justus Henry Nelson, an early missionary in the Amazon.

Genealogy was one of Jessica Nelson North's avocations.

== Education and marriage ==
She received a bachelor's degree from Lawrence College in Appleton, Wisconsin, where she was a member of Alpha Delta Pi, and went on to graduate school at the University of Chicago. North married Reed Inness MacDonald on June 11, 1921, in Edgerton, Wisconsin, and had two children.

== Writing career ==
During college, North was the president of the University of Chicago Poetry Club and was the editor of the Adelphean and the History of Alpha Delta Pi.

North published her first novel, Arden Acres, in 1935. It is a family drama and social commentary set in the Great Depression told from the point of view of the oldest daughter of a family in the fictional Arden Acres, Illinois. She also published Miss Missouri, The Long Leash (1928), The Prayer Rug and The Pocket. Her poem about a child's tea party is one of her most beloved works. It starts:

I had a little tea party

this afternoon at three.
Twas very small,
three guests in all,

I, Myself, and Me!

In the thirties and forties, North was an editor of Poetry magazine, one of the leading poetry magazines of the English-speaking world. She also published The Giant's Shoe in 1967, an illustrated children's book. Her work has been included in textbooks including Golden Trails.

Jessica Nelson North died on June 3, 1988, in Downers Grove, Illinois.

== Awards ==
- The Long Leash was selected by the Poetry Club as one of the best volumes of the year.
- Arden Acres won the Friends of American Writers first novel award
