= Rascal the Raccoon =

Japanese anime series by Nippon Animation

- Title card
- あらいぐまラスカル
- Genre: Drama
- Based on: Rascal by Sterling North
- Screenplay by: Akira Miyazaki; Shōgo Ōta; Kasuke Satō
- Directed by: Masaharu Endō; Hiroshi Saitō (1-33); Shigeo Koshi (34-52)
- Music by: Takeo Watanabe
- Country of origin: Japan
- Original language: Japanese
- No. of episodes: 52

Production
- Executive producer: Koichi Motohashi
- Producers: Junzō Nakajima; Yoshio Katō
- Editor: Takeshi Seyama
- Production companies: Nippon Animation; Fuji Television

Original release
- Network: FNS (Fuji TV)
- Release: 2 January – 25 December 1977

Rascal the Raccoon (あらいぐまラスカル, Araiguma Rasukaru; literally Raccoon Rascal, with the Japanese word for raccoon meaning "washing bear") is a 1977 Japanese animated TV series by Nippon Animation. The series is based on the 1963 autobiographical novel Rascal, A Memoir of a Better Era by Sterling North. It aired on Fuji TV as part of the World Masterpiece Theater staple.

As a result of the series' popularity, raccoons were imported to Japan as exotic pets, which caused them to become an invasive species in the country.

== Plot ==
The series revolves around a young boy who decided to provide shelter to a raccoon that was discovered by a hunter. As the boy attempted to domesticate the wild animal as part of his family, he soon realized through trials and tribulations that his efforts were futile and decided to release Rascal back into the wild.

== Cast ==
- Masako Nozawa as Rascal and Greta Sunderland
- Toshihiko Utsumi as Sterling North
- Yoshiko Matsuo as Theodora "Theo" North
- Michiru Haga as Jessica North
- Masato Yamanouchi as Willard North
- Kuniko Kashii as Elisabeth North
- Yūji Shikamata as Oscar Sunderland
- Akio Nojima as Carl
- Eken Mine as Federiko
- Hisako Kyouda as Clarissa
- Ichirô Nagai as Thurman
- Kazuko Sugiyama as Sensei
- Masahiko Murase as Conway
- Masaya Taki as Slammy
- Miina Tominaga as Alice
- Mikio Terashima as Doctor Michel
- Miyoko Asō as Hacket
- Takako Sasuga as Martha
- Takeshi Kuwabara as Arthur
- Tohru Furuya as Tom
- Toshiya Ueda as Futon

== Episodes ==
- Episode 1: Cute Fella with the Black Mask
- Episode 2: My New Friend
- Episode 3: Friendship
- Episode 4: Milwaukee Moon
- Episode 5: A Gift for Oscar
- Episode 6: Good Bye Skunks
- Episode 7: Which Is Faster, House or Car?
- Episode 8: Frog and Boxing
- Episode 9: Mother's Return
- Episode 10: First Exploration

== Music ==
The series uses two pieces of music for the opening theme and the ending theme. The opening theme song is called "Rock River e" (ロックリバーヘ, Rokku Ribâ e; lit. 'To Rock River'), and the ending theme is "Oide Rascal" (おいでラスカル, Oide Rasukaru; lit. 'Rascal Come'), both written by Eriko Kishida and sung by the Japanese vocalist by Kumiko Oosugi. The show's music was composed by Takeo Watanabe, who worked on many Japanese animated TV series of the 1970s and 1980s.

== Impact ==
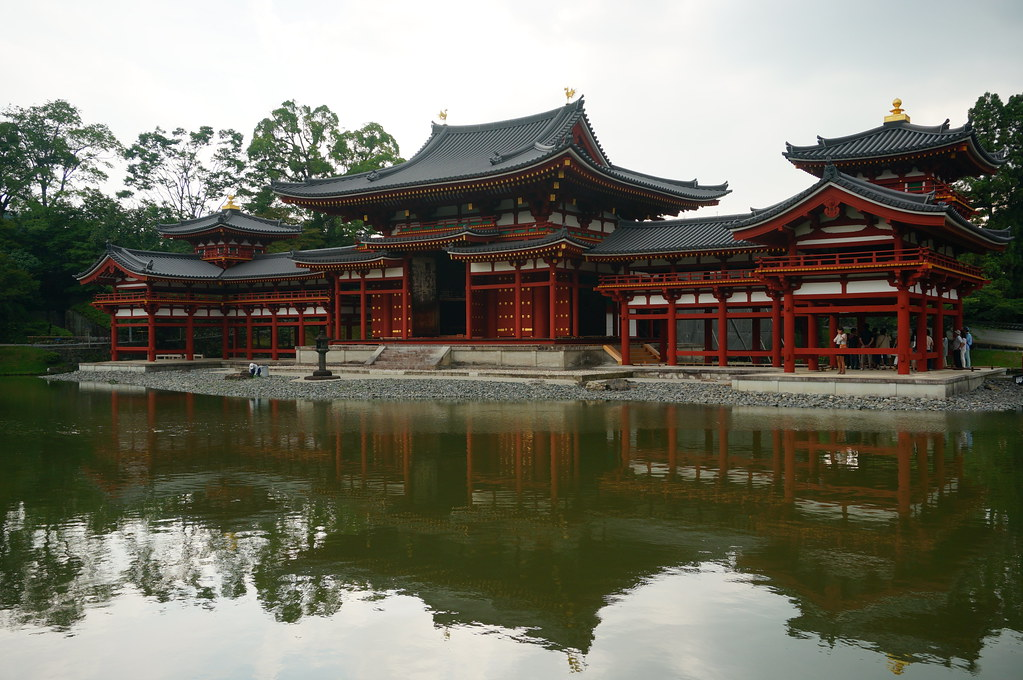
Byōdō-in in Kyoto, Japan

Raccoons are an invasive species in Japan and there is evidence that Rascal the Raccoon has contributed enormously to the problem of invasive raccoons in Japan. Like other invasive species, raccoons in Japan have few natural predators.

Although Rascal the Raccoon's storyline revolves around the difficulties of taking in a raccoon as a pet, Japanese citizens became inspired to import raccoons into the country as exotic pets, leading to unforeseen consequences. In Japan, up to 1,500 raccoons were imported as pets each year after the success of Rascal the Raccoon. In 2004, the descendants of discarded or escaped animals lived in 42 of 47 prefectures and then to all 47 prefectures by 2008. These raccoons are now a pest in Japan and imports of raccoons are now banned.

The importation of raccoons was banned after Japanese citizens started releasing their pet raccoons into the wild —especially after the final episode of Rascal the Raccoon aired on Japanese television. Additionally, raccoons can become aggressive and hard to handle as adults, which further encouraged people to release them.

This negatively affected Japan's natural ecosystem and man-made infrastructures and it was estimated that about 80% of Japanese temples were damaged by raccoons including Byōdō-in in Kyoto which has more than 900 years of history. Raccoons attributed to Rascal also caused the destruction of crops in the agricultural sector and Japan suffers an estimated 30,000,000 yen annually from the effects in the agricultural sector alone.

Even with backlash from animal advocates, the Japanese government decided to adopt the 0% tolerance policy where the goal is to cull as many raccoons as possible. This includes killing thousands of raccoons each year. The government also placed a lot of tight sanctions to minimize the chances of being able to import any more raccoons into the country. In 2003, the Hokkaido government specifically implemented the 10-year plan to completely eradicate raccoons in Japan, but these attempts proved to be mostly futile as there was not enough financial support.

== Rascal appearances ==
Rascal has appeared in commercials, games and spin-off media:

- The Adventures of Peter Pan (1989)
- Pokapoka Mori no Rascal (2006, aired on Kids Station as the studio's first animated series for pre-school children)
- Araiguma Rascal Special in Monster Strike game (game and CM)
- Meitantei Rascal (2014, aired on NHK Educational TV)
- Line, a South Korean communication application

== Video games ==
- Araiguma Rascal: Raccoon Rascal, a puzzle game released in Japan for the Super Famicom on March 25, 1994
- Oide Rascal, action game developed by Agatsuma Entertainment and published by Tam in April 2001 for the Game Boy Color.

== Spin-off ==
A spin-off series, titled Araiguma Calcal-dan, was announced on December 12, 2024, and aired from April 4 to September 12, 2025.
