= The Perils of Pauline =

The Perils of Pauline may refer to:

- The Perils of Pauline (1914 serial), a silent film serial
- The Perils of Pauline (1933 serial), a film serial from Universal Studios
- The Perils of Pauline (1947 film), from Paramount Pictures
- The Perils of Pauline (1967 film), from Universal Pictures
- "The Perils of Pauline", a famous and controversial essay by author Renata Adler about film critic Pauline Kael
