= Edward Grassman =

American politician

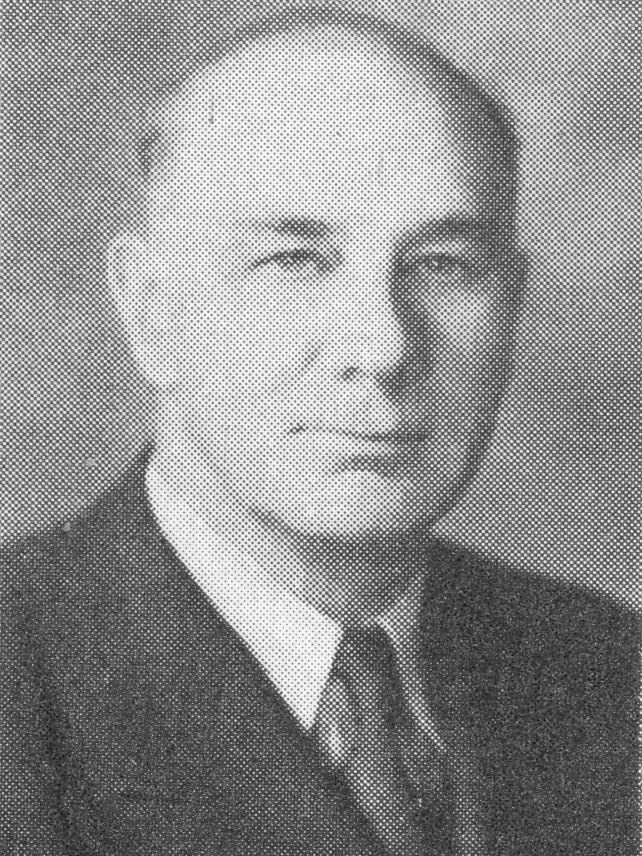
Grassman circa 1940

Edward Grassman (November 16, 1882 – September 20, 1952) was a member of the Wisconsin State Assembly.

== Biography ==
Grassman was born on November 16, 1882, in Richland County, Wisconsin. He graduated from high school in Sextonville, Wisconsin before attending the University of Wisconsin–Whitewater and Valparaiso University. Grassman died on September 20, 1952.

== Career ==
Grassman was a member of the Assembly from 1933 until his death. Additionally, he was an alderman and Mayor of Edgerton, Wisconsin and Supervisor of Rock County, Wisconsin. He was a Republican.
