= Pauline of Württemberg =

Pauline of Württemberg may refer to several different members of Württemberg royalty:

- Pauline Therese of Württemberg (1800–1873), daughter of Duke Louis of Württemberg and third wife of King William I of Württemberg
- Princess Pauline of Württemberg (1810–1856), daughter of Prince Paul of Württemberg and second wife of William, Duke of Nassau
- Princess Pauline of Württemberg (1877–1965), daughter of William II of Württemberg and wife of William Frederick, Prince of Wied
