= Charles E. Woodworth =

American entomologist

Charles E. Woodworth

Charles E. Woodworth (1897–1966) served as a major in the United States Army during World War II and as an entomologist for the United States Department of Agriculture Agricultural Research Service.

== Birth ==
He was born in Berkeley, California, on September 25, 1897. His father, Charles W. Woodworth, would become a Professor Emeritus of the University of California, Berkeley and is a noted figure in the history of Entomology; his mother was Leonora Stern.

== Early life and education ==
Woodworth graduated with a BS and an MS from the University of California, Berkeley. His 1923 Masters thesis was entitled "The Sawflies of California". He took a job as a teacher at Modesto Junior College where he met and married the widow Sarah Louise Nelson Vickers, who was the daughter of early Amazon missionaries Justus Henry Nelson and Fannie Bishop Capen. Justus presided over their 1926 wedding in Berkeley. He adopted her son, James Vickers Woodworth. While in Modesto, they had a daughter, Elizabeth Louise Woodworth who was born very premature, but survived. A newspaper article about her survival detailed how "she could be put in a cigar box" and was picked up by the Associated Press. They lived at 322 Johnson Street in Modesto.

The young couple then moved to Wisconsin where Woodworth attended the University of Wisconsin–Madison where he received a Ph.D. in Entomology. His 1930 122 page Ph.D. dissertation was entitled "The effect of reduced pressure on the respiration of the honey bee."

== Military service ==
During World War I, he entered the United States Army and was in training when the armistice was declared. In World War II, during a twenty-six month period in the South Pacific, Burma and China, he was commanding officer of the Army's 33rd Mosquito Control Unit. Their job was to find the breeding place of the mosquitoes and to teach the soldiers how to protect themselves. He received special citations and ended his service as a major. He returned in October 1945. His lungs were significantly damaged during this service. He had to hang upside down in numerous occasions for the rest of his life to drain them. This service injury also contributed to his somewhat early death of a respiratory ailment in 1966.

== Entomology career ==
He had a long career with the USDA Agricultural Research Service. He was a leader of the Vegetable Insects Laboratory in the Blalock Tracts at College Place, Washington. His principal research was into the wireworm, although he worked on many other things during his long career. The fact that the wireworm lives underground makes them difficult to exterminate. Much of his work had to do with techniques to allow reasonable crop yield in the presence of wireworms. He also did work on controlling Onion maggot flies. Thirty-one insect specimens that were collected by him are in the Essig Museum of Entomology at the University of California, Berkeley.

== Community service ==
He was listed in "Who's Who in the West" and "Who's Who in Washington". He was a charter member of the College Place Kiwanis Club and was its secretary for its first 15 years. He also led several Community Chest drives. He was also a member of the First Congregational Church of Walla Walla. The Mayor of College Place described him as "a supporter of community, cultural, and spiritual aims who always could be counted on."
