= Pauline Jacobus =

American artist (1840–1930)

Pauline Jacobus (born December 13, 1840 – 1930) was an American studio potter from Chicago who worked in Edgerton, Wisconsin.

Jacobus, the wife of a Chicago merchant of the 1880s, was an accomplished painter of porcelain before she decided to try her hand at crafting and decorating the very first art pottery in Chicago in 1883. Her firm "Pauline Pottery" moved to Edgerton in 1888. Although the move to Edgerton allowed the firm to expand, employing up to 40 people during its most active phase, the 1893 death of Pauline Jacobus' husband, businessman Oscar, and the simultaneous financial panic that spread across America that same year, doomed the struggling art pottery company. A studio phase of the pottery continued until Jacobus' rural Edgerton home, "The Bogart," was destroyed in a fire in July 1911. Jacobus died at a Dousman, Wisconsin retirement home, neglected and forgotten in 1930.

In 2005, a large collection of Pauline Pottery went on permanent display in a museum located in the former Edgerton 1906 train depot. The collection is owned by the Arts Council of Edgerton.
