= Janet Soergel Mielke =

20th century American politician

Janet Soergel Mielke (born Janet A. Soergel, June 30, 1937) is a retired American secretary, union officer, and Democratic politician from Rock County, Wisconsin. She served two terms in the Wisconsin State Assembly, from 1971 through 1975.

== Biography ==
Born in Edgerton, Wisconsin, Mielke graduated from Milton Union High School and was a secretary. Mielke served in the Wisconsin State Assembly as a Democrat in 1971 and 1973.
