= Pauline Amos =

English artist

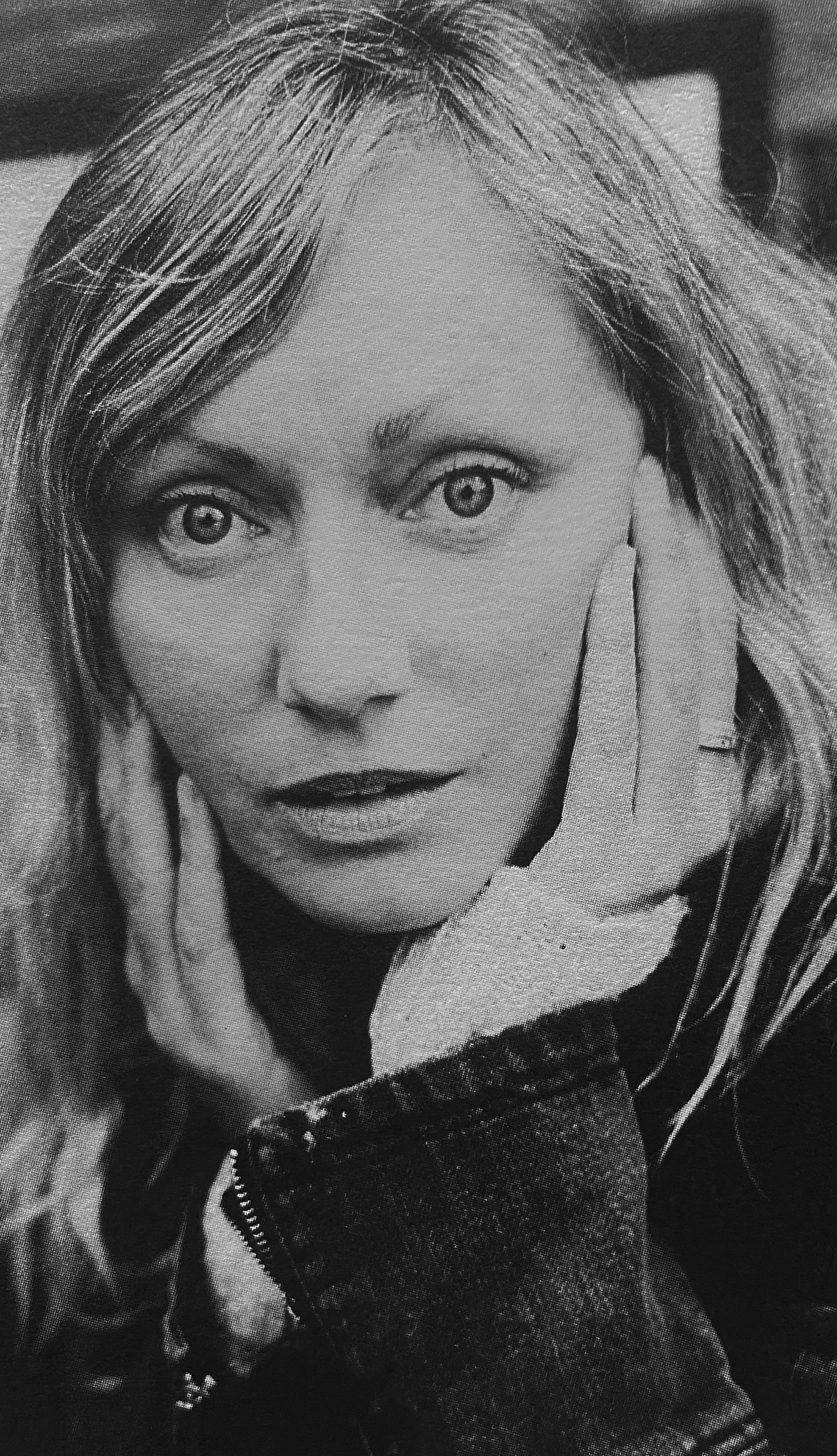
- Pauline Amos
- Born: Liverpool
- Known for: Performance Art
- Website: https://paulineamos.co.uk/

Pauline Amos is an English artist, born in Liverpool, and known for Performance Art, painting, improvising and multidisciplinary work. Amos has a PhD from Dartington College of Arts. Professor Edward Cowie was her supervisor, and has drawn international acclaim for her "provocative, powerful, and bold works".

== Career ==
Amos experimented in Liverpool's music and acting scene in the early 1990s before incorporating her experience into painting and performance art. Acting roles in Coronation Street and BBC TV series Bread

In the early 2000s, Amos held a series of in-gallery performances entitled "My Flesh My Canvas", which led to exhibitions and performances throughout Europe and Asia. In 2009 she had an exhibition and performance in London titled "Atomic Forms and Their Corruptions", using her naked body as a canvas, working in the moment, and placing herself within the painting, to become part of it. Amos was interviewed by Jenni Murray on BBC Radio 4 Woman's Hour about the use of the naked female body in art and the sexual content of the performance objectifying her body. Amos replied: "I want people to see a person".

Amos first came to media attention in 2005. A 24-hour performance in The Opera Paese Gallery, Rome, resulted in Amos launching her first London exhibition at the private members club, Home House, in London, with a performance painting on sale priced at £1.3m, a comment on the art/commodities market. The price was purposefully provocative, causing media comment and opinion. The work later became known as "The £1.3m".

In 2009, Amos and classically trained ballet dancer Anna-Mi Fredriksson collaborated to present an exhibition and performance of painting, sound and movement. William Orbit joined the collaboration and LUXOR was created. Luxor performed at Shunt, London in 2009 and The Lowry, Manchester in 2010.

Recent exhibitions include "The Power of She", 2023, at The Bowman Gallery, London, a ground-breaking exhibition celebrating women in the arts.

Amos has written, directed, and produced the feature film "Branded – ЗАТАВРОВАНА" or "Born Criminal", a Ukrainian–British production (also accompanied by a book of the same name). A Ukrainian soldier Kateryna Polishchuk, aka Ptashka from Azovstal, is the voice of the film. Branded toured the UK with screenings in cinemas followed by Q&A March-April 2024. The film is listed on the British Council database and focuses on the importance of freedom of artistic expression, as written about in Amos' article for Pen International and reviewed by Ecran Magazine. Amos cites a film by Robert Enrico called An Occurrence at Owl Creek Bridge, based on the story of the same name by Ambrose Bierce (An Occurrence at Owl Creek Bridge), as an influential film for her. Curiosity with film making and having a close connection with film producer Colin Vaines has enabled new work in films that have been shown in various festivals including the short film festival at Cannes, the most recent being "Love Scars" with Meredith Ostrom.

Amos has published two poetry books: In Person (2024) and Miriam My Mamre Oak (2025). The latter is accompanied by a film of the same name.
