= Alexander E. Matheson =

American politician

Alexander E. Matheson (July 11, 1868 – November 11, 1931) was an American jurist and legislator.

Born in Eagle, Waukesha County, Wisconsin, Matheson received his bachelor's and master's degrees from Beloit College and his law degree from University of Wisconsin Law School. Matheson practiced law in Janesville, Wisconsin. Matheson served on the Janesville Common Council and on the local draft board during World War I. In 1921 and 1923, Matheson served in the Wisconsin State Assembly as a Republican. Matheson then served as postmaster of Janesville, Wisconsin and then, in 1928, was appointed Rock County judge. He was elected to the full term in 1929 and served until his death. Matheson died at his home in Janesville, Wisconsin after being ill for a few weeks.
