= Alva Garey =

American politician

Member of the Wisconsin Senate from the 15th district
- In office 1923–1926

Personal details
- Born: June 2, 1883 Edgerton, Wisconsin, United States
- Died: September 9, 1971 (aged 88) Madison, Wisconsin, United States

Alva Edward Garey (June 2, 1883 – September 9, 1971) was an American educator, soldier, and politician.

== Background ==
Garey was born on June 2, 1883, in Porter, Wisconsin. He was educated in the public school at Stebbinsville. He farmed, took the University of Wisconsin's short course in agriculture as a correspondence course on the farm, studied at Milton Academy, and graduated with a B. A. degree from Milton College. In 1917 he received his law degree from the University of Georgia. During World War I, Garey enlisted in the United States Army as a private, reaching the rank of captain. After the war, he went into the United States Army Reserve as a major, and would eventually reach the rank of colonel.

He started legal practice in Edgerton. In June 1920, he received an M.A. degree from the University of Wisconsin, having finished his coursework after the war.

== Political office ==
In 1922, Garey was elected to represent the newly apportioned 15th district of the Wisconsin State Senate (Rock County) from 1923 to 1926. He was a Republican, and was unopposed.

== Civil service and later years ==
Wisconsin Governor Philip La Follette appointed Garey Wisconsin state director of personnel and he instituted reforms for the Wisconsin civil service. In 1936, Garey was one of the founders of the American Federation of State, County and Municipal Employees. Garey died on September 9, 1971, in a nursing home in Monona, Wisconsin.
