= Di Paolo =

Di Paolo is an Italian surname, and may refer to:

- Andrea Di Paolo (born 1978), Italian pianist and composer
- Ezequiel Di Paolo (born 1970), Argentine cognitive scientist
- Fabricio Di Paolo (born 1980), Brazilian pianist known as Lord Vinheteiro
- Giannicola di Paolo (c. 1460–1544), Italian painter
- Giovanni di Paolo (c. 1403–1482), Italian painter
- Jacopo di Paolo (c. 1345–c. 1430), Italian painter
- Luca di Paolo da Matelica (c. 1435 to 1441–1491), Italian painter
- Marco Di Paolo (born 1986), Italian footballer
- Nick Di Paolo (born 1961 or 1962), American standup comedian, writer, actor and radio personality
- Paolo Di Paolo (1925–2023), Italian photographer
- Patrizia Di Paolo, Italian 21st century musician
- Tonio di Paolo (fl. 1970s–2010), American opera singer

== See also ==
- Antonia di Paolo di Dono (1456–1491), Italian painter
- Giovanni di Paolo Rucellai (1403–1481), Italian merchant
- DiPaolo, variant
