= Paolo (disambiguation) =

Paolo is a masculine given name. It may also refer to:

- List of storms named Paolo
- Paolo (coin), a pontifical coin
- SS Sardinia (1888), a passenger-cargo ship previously known as Paolo V
- Paolo (surname)

== See also ==
- Di Paolo, a surname
- DiPaolo, a surname
- San Paolo (disambiguation)
