= Paolo =

- Pronunciation: Italian: [ˈpaːolo]
- Gender: male
- Language: Italian
- Name day: June 29

Other names
- Related names: Paul, Pablo, Paola, Paulo, Paavo, Pavel, Paulus

Paolo is a masculine given name, the Italian form of the name Paul. It may refer to:

== People ==
=== Art ===
- Paolo Abbate (1884–1973), Italian-American sculptor
- Paolo Agostino (1583–1629), Italian composer and organist
- Paolo Alboni (1671–1734), Italian painter
- Paolo Antonio Barbieri (1603–1649), Italian painter
- Paolo Buggiani (born 1933), Italian contemporary artist
- Paolo Carosone (born 1941), Italian painter and sculptor
- Paolo Moranda Cavazzola (1486–1522), Italian painter
- Paolo Farinati (c. 1524 – c. 1606), Italian painter
- Paolo Fiammingo (c. 1540–1596), Flemish painter
- Paolo Domenico Finoglia (c. 1590–1645), Italian painter
- Paolo Grilli (1857–1952), Italian sculptor and painter
- Paolo de Matteis (1662–1728), Italian painter
- Paolo Monaldi, Italian painter
- Paolo Pagani (1655–1716), Italian painter
- Paolo Panceri (1833–1877), Italian anatomist and zoologist
- Paolo Persico (c. 1729–1796), Italian sculptor
- Paolo Pino (1534–1565), Italian painter
- Paolo Gerolamo Piola (1666–1724), Italian painter
- Paolo Porpora (1617–1673), Italian painter
- Paolo Romano (died c. 1470), Italian sculptor
- Paolo Sarti (born late 1700s), Italian painter
- Paolo Schmidlin (born 1964), Italian sculptor
- Paolo Uccello (1397–1475), Italian painter
- Paolo Veneziano (died c. 1362), Italian painter
- Paolo Veronese (1528–1588), Italian painter

=== Business ===
- Paolo Cuccia (born 1953), Italian businessman
- Paolo Pininfarina (born 1958), Italian businessman and engineer
- Paolo Zampolli (born 1970), Italian businessman

=== Film and television ===
- Paolo Ballesteros (born 1982), Filipino actor and television personality
- Paolo Bediones (born 1974), Filipino newscaster and television host
- Paolo Bonacelli (1937–2025), Italian actor
- Paolo Bonolis (born 1961), Italian television personality
- Paolo Carlini (1922–1979), Italian actor
- Paolo Contis (born 1984), Filipino actor and comedian
- Paolo Andrea Di Pietro (born 1986), Italian actor and singer
- Paolo Montalban (born 1973), Filipino-American actor
- Pier Paolo Pasolini (1922–1975), Italian film director
- Paolo Rossi (actor) (born 1953), Italian actor and comedian
- Paolo Seganti (born 1964), Italian actor
- Paolo Sorrentino (born 1970), Italian film director

=== Government, politics and law ===
- Paolo Borsellino (1940–1992), Italian judge
- Paolo Boselli (1838–1932), Italian politician
- Paolo Calcinaro (born 1977), Italian politician
- Paolo Cappa (1888–1956), Italian journalist, lawyer and politician
- Paolo Duterte (born 1975), Filipino politician
- Paolo Grossi (judge) (1933–2022), Italian judge
- Paolo Romani (born 1947), Italian politician
- Paolo Alberto Rossi (1887–1969), Italian diplomat
- Paolo Rossi (politician) (1900–1985), Italian lawyer and politician
- Paolo Ruggiero (born 1957), Italian general

=== Literature ===
- Paolo Berlusconi (born 1949), Italian publisher
- Paolo Cognetti (born 1978), Italian writer
- Paolo Giordano (born 1982), Italian writer
- Paolo Volponi (1924–1994), Italian writer

=== Music ===
- Paolo Buonvino (born 1968), Italian composer
- Paolo Conte (born 1937), Italian singer
- Paolo Andrea Di Pietro (born 1986), Italian opera singer
- Paolo Fresu (born 1961), Italian musician
- Paolo Meneguzzi (born 1976), Swiss-Italian singer
- Paolo Montarsolo (1925–2006), Italian opera singer
- Paolo Nutini (born 1987), Scottish singer
- Paolo Rossi, former bassist of Fleshgod Apocalypse
- Paolo Rustichelli (born 1953), Italian musician
- Paolo Silveri (1913–2001), Italian opera singer
- Paolo Vallesi (born 1964), Italian singer-songwriter

=== Religion ===
- Paolo Alberi (died 1591), Roman Catholic archbishop
- Paolo Angelo Ballerini (1814–1897), Italian Roman Catholic archbishop
- Paolo Bertoli (1908–2001), Italian cardinal
- Paolo Burali d'Arezzo (1511–1578), Italian cardinal
- Paolo Emilio Cesi (1481–1537), Italian cardinal
- Paolo Dall'Oglio (born 1954), Italian Jesuit priest
- Paolo Dezza (1901–1999), Italian cardinal
- Paolo di Campofregoso (1427–1498), Italian Roman Catholic archbishop
- Paolo Giobbe (1880–1972), Italian cardinal
- Paolo Marella (1895–1984), Italian cardinal
- Paolo Pezzi (born 1960), Italian Roman Catholic archbishop
- Paolo Romeo (born 1938), Italian cardinal
- Paolo Sardi (1934–2019), Italian cardinal
- Paolo Segneri (1624–1694), Italian Jesuit priest
- Paolo Emilio Sfondrati (1560–1618), Italian cardinal

=== Science and medicine ===
- Paolo Boffetta (born 1958), Italian epidemiologist
- Paolo Chiavenna, Italian astronomer
- Paolo Macchiarini (born 1958), Italian surgeon
- Paolo Sassone-Corsi (1956–2020), Italian molecular biologist

=== Sports ===
==== Football ====
===== A–E =====
- Paolo Acerbis (born 1981), Italian footballer
- Paolo Agabitini (born 1959), Italian footballer
- Paolo Agosteo (1908–2008), Italian footballer
- Paolo Alcocer (born 2000), German footballer
- Paolo Baiocco (born 1989), Italian footballer
- Paolo Baldieri (born 1965), Italian footballer
- Paolo Barison (1936–1979), Italian footballer
- Paolo Bianco (born 1977), Italian footballer and manager
- Paolo Borelli (born 1958), Italian footballer
- Paolo Branduani (born 1989), Italian footballer
- Paolo Bugas (born 1994), Filipino footballer
- Paolo Campinoti (born 1990), Italian footballer
- Paolo Di Canio (born 1968), Italian football manager
- Paolo Cannavaro (born 1981), Italian footballer
- Paolo Carbonaro (born 1989), Italian footballer
- Paolo Carbone (born 1982), Italian footballer
- Paolo Cardozo (born 1989), Uruguayan footballer
- Paolo Castellazzi (born 1987), Italian footballer
- Paolo Castelli (born 1980), Italian footballer
- Paolo Castellini (born 1979), Italian footballer
- Paolo Cimpiel (born 1940), Italian footballer
- Paolo Conti (born 1950), Italian footballer
- Paolo Dametto (born 1993), Italian footballer
- Paolo De Ceglie (born 1986), Italian footballer
- Paolo Dellafiore (born 1985), Argentine-born Italian footballer

===== F–M =====
- Paolo Facchinetti (born 1984), Italian footballer
- Paolo Alberto Faccini (born 1961), Italian footballer
- Paolo Faragò (born 1993), Italian footballer
- Paolo Farinola (born 1984), Brazilian-born Greek footballer
- Paolo Fernandes (born 1998), Spanish footballer
- Paolo Foglio (born 1975), Italian footballer
- Paolo Frangipane (born 1979), Argentine footballer
- Paolo Frascatore (born 1992), Italian footballer
- Paolo Dal Fiume (born 1953), Italian footballer
- Paolo Ghiglione (born 1997), Italian footballer
- Paolo Gigantelli (born 1979), Swiss footballer
- Paolo Ginestra (born 1979), Italian footballer
- Paolo Giovannelli (born 1960), Italian footballer
- Paolo Goltz (born 1985), Argentine footballer
- Paolo Gozzi (born 2001), Italian footballer
- Paolo Grillo (born 1997), Italian footballer
- Paolo Grossi (footballer) (born 1981), Italian footballer
- Paolo Guastalvino (born 1979), Italian footballer
- Paolo Guerrero (born 1984), Peruvian footballer
- Paolo de la Haza (born 1983), Peruvian footballer
- Paolo Hurtado (born 1990), Peruvian footballer
- Paolo Ivani (born 1997), Albanian footballer
- Paolo Jacobini (1919–2003), Italian footballer
- Paolo Maino (born 1989), Italian footballer
- Paolo Maldini (born 1968), Italian footballer
- Paolo Marchi (born 1991), Italian footballer
- Paolo Mariotti (born 1979), Sammarinese footballer
- Paolo Mastrantonio (born 1967), Italian footballer
- Paolo Mavolo (born 1992), Hungarian footballer
- Paolo Mazza (1901–1981), Italian football manager
- Paolo Mazzoleni (born 1974), Italian football referee
- Paolo Medina (born 1999), Mexican footballer
- Paolo Monelli (born 1963), Italian footballer
- Paolo Montagna (born 1976), Sammarinese footballer
- Paolo Montero (born 1971), Uruguayan footballer and manager

===== N–Z =====
- Paolo Negro (born 1972), Italian footballer and manager
- Paolo Orlandoni (born 1972), Italian footballer
- Paolo Ortiz (born 1985), Paraguayan footballer
- Paolo Patrucchi (1908–?), Italian footballer
- Paolo Pellicanò (born 1995), Italian footballer
- Paolo Persoglia (born 1994), Sanmarrinese judoka
- Paolo Pestrin (1936–2009), Italian footballer
- Paolo Poggi (born 1971), Italian footballer
- Paolo Ponzo (1972–2013), Italian footballer
- Paolo Pulici (born 1950), Italian footballer and manager
- Paolo Regoli (born 1991), Italian footballer
- Paolo Ríos (born 2000), Mexican footballer
- Paolo Rozzio (born 1992), Italian footballer
- Paolo Sabak (born 1999), Belgian footballer
- Paolo Sammarco (born 1983), Italian footballer
- Pier Paolo Scarrone (born 1951), Italian footballer
- Paolo Seppani (born 1986), Italian footballer
- Paolo Signorelli (footballer) (1939–2018), Italian footballer
- Paolo Sirena (born 1945), Italian footballer
- Paolo Sollier (born 1948), Italian footballer and manager
- Paolo Stringara (born 1962), Italian footballer and manager
- Paolo Suárez (born 1980), Uruguayan-Salvadoran footballer
- Paolo Tagliavento (born 1972), Italian football referee
- Paolo Todeschini (1920–1993), Italian footballer and manager
- Paolo Tornaghi (born 1988), Italian footballer
- Paolo Tramezzani (born 1970), Italian footballer and manager
- Paolo Valagussa (born 1993), Italian footballer
- Paolo Vanoli (born 1972), Italian footballer
- Paolo Vernazza (born 1979), English footballer
- Paolo Viganò (1950–2014), Italian footballer
- Paolo Yrizar (born 1997), Mexican footballer
- Paolo Ziliani (born 1971), Italian footballer

==== Other sports ====
- Paolo Bacchini (born 1985), Italian figure skater
- Paolo Banchero (born 2002), Italian-American basketball player
- Paolo Bertolucci (born 1951), Italian tennis player
- Paolo Boi (1528–1598), Italian chess player
- Paolo Bossini (born 1985), Italian swimmer
- Paolo Camossi (born 1974), Italian triple jumper
- Paolo Casarsa (born 1975), Italian decathlete
- Paolo Di Girolamo (born 1994), Italian rower
- Paolo Grecucci (born 1952), Italian racewalker
- Paolo Lepori (born 1959), Italian sprint canoer
- Paolo Lorenzi (born 1981), Italian tennis player
- Paolo Luschi (born 1970), Italian sprint canoer
- Paolo Pizzo (born 1983), Italian fencer

=== Other ===
- Paolo Brera (1949–2019), Italian economist
- Paolo Hewitt, English music journalist
- Paolo Malatesta (c. 1246–1285), best known for the story of his affair with Francesca da Polenta, portrayed by Dante in the Inferno
- Paolo Di Paolo (1925–2023), Italian photographer
- Paolo Renda, Italian-Canadian mobster
- Paolo Ruffini (mathematician) (1765–1822), Italian mathematician
- Paolo Soleri (1919–2013), Italian architect

== Fictional characters ==
- Paolo (Dune), in the Dune universe
- Paolo, a character appearing in several Friends Season One episodes as Rachel's boyfriend

== See also ==
- Paola, feminine form of the name
- Paolo (surname)
- Paulo
