= Patrizia Di Paolo =

Italian musician and stage director

Patrizia Di Paolo is an Italian musician and stage director.

== Performance ==
Patrizia Di Paolo has performed as principal viola in the European Community Chamber orchestra, the Rai Orchestra in Milan, the Toscanini Orchestra in Parma, Bologna City Theatre and the Teatro La Fenice in Venice.

She currently plays viola in the Venetian ensemble Musica a Palazzo.

== Productions ==
In 2005 Di Paolo oversaw the direction of all the grand operas presented in Venice by Musica a Palazzo in the Palazzo Barbarigo Minotto in Venice.

In 2007, she oversaw the direction of La Traviata presented at the Royal Pavilion for the 41st Brighton International Festival (UK). The production received The Argus press award for the best production of the Festival.

In 2008, she directed theBarbiere di Siviglia at the Potsdam International Festival in Germany.

In 2012, she directed Rigoletto at Teatro Comunale in Ferrara.

In 2013, she directed "Rigoletto" at Teatro Comunale in Treviso.

== Reviews ==
Press

- The Daily Telegraph "Captivated by the quality of the music, the splendour of the setting, the power and passion of the singing"
- The Argus "This Opera of love and loss is totally stunning, fully engaging and sometimes raises the hairs on the back of your neck."
- La Nuova Ferrara "Patrizia Di Paolo, firm hand and not bizarre ideas for her direction, already loved by the audience."
