= Paolantoni =

Paolantoni is an Italian surname derived from the given names Paolo and Antonio. Notable people with the surname include:

- Francesco Paolantoni (born 1956), Italian actor and comedian
- Philippe Paolantoni (born 1952), French civil servant and administrator

== See also ==
- Paolantonio
