= Bruce Weber (photographer) =

American photographer and film director (born 1946)

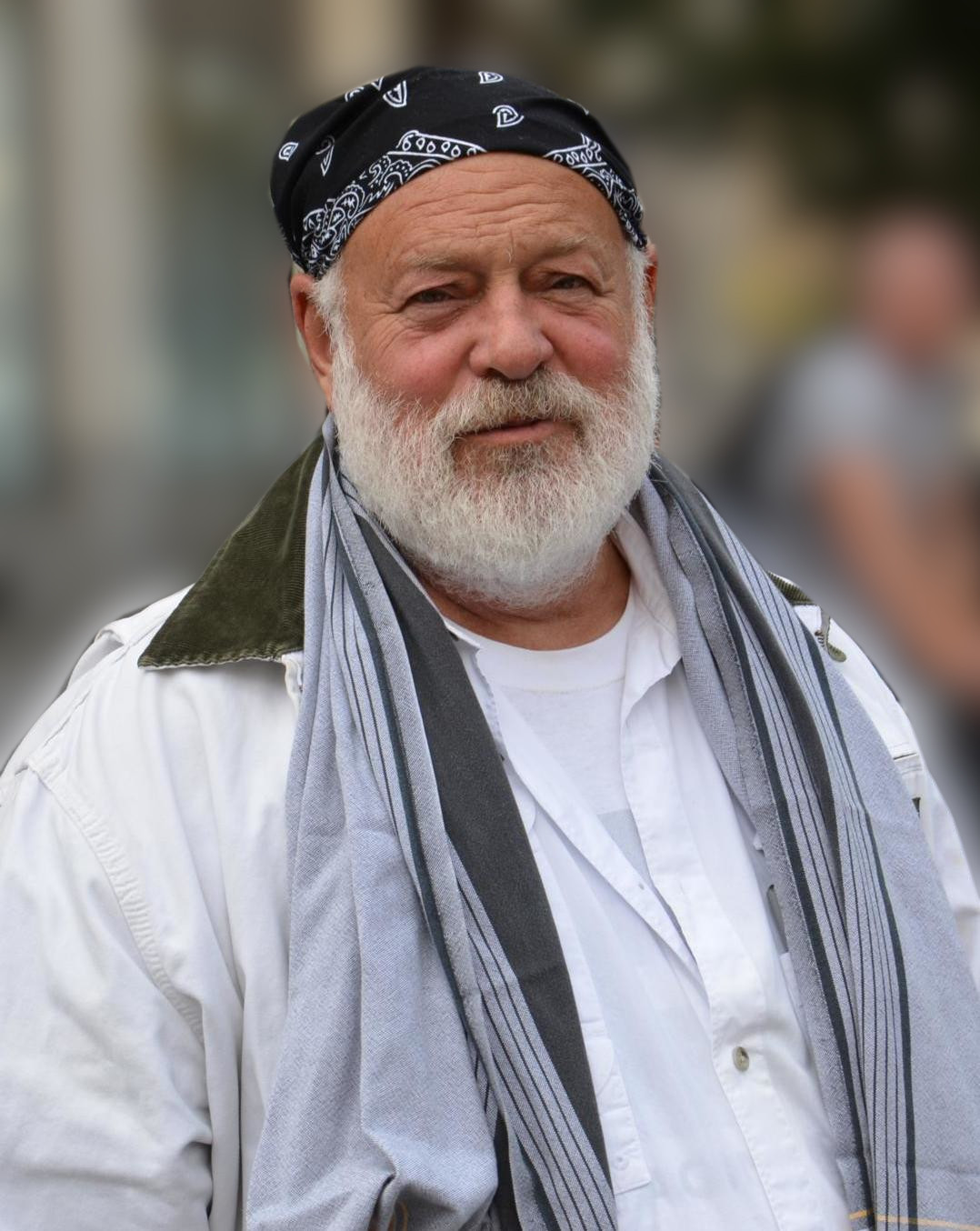
- Weber in 2011
- Born: March 29, 1946 (age 80); Greensburg, Pennsylvania, U.S.
- Occupations: Photographer; film director
- Spouse: Nan Bush
- Website: bruceweber.com

Bruce Weber (born March 29, 1946) is an American fashion photographer and film director known for his work with fashion brands and magazines.

Weber has directed several films, including Let's Get Lost (1988), a documentary about jazz musician Chet Baker, and Chop Suey (2001), a portrait of a wrestler. Let's Get Lost received an Academy Award nomination for Best Documentary Feature and a Cinecritica Award at the Venice Film Festival. Weber is also the founder and co-owner of Little Bear Press, which publishes books and the independent arts magazine All-American.

Weber has been accused of sexual assault by more than 20 models, and has been the subject of three lawsuits, all of which have reached settlements. He currently resides in Miami and is married to Nan Bush, who is also his agent.

== Life and work ==
Weber was born in Greensburg, Pennsylvania, to a Jewish family. His fashion photography first appeared in the late 1970s in GQ magazine, where he had frequent cover photos. Nan Bush, his longtime companion and agent, was able to secure a contract with Federated Department Stores to shoot the 1978 Bloomingdales mail catalog. He came to the attention of the general public in the late 1980s and early 1990s with his advertising images for Calvin Klein. He was first approached by Klein to work on an underwear campaign, and Weber took inspiration from Herbert List's shoot in Santorini. His straightforward black-and-white shots, featuring an unclothed woman and man on a swing facing each other, two clothed men in bed, and model Marcus Schenkenberg suggestively holding jeans in front of himself in a shower, catapulted them both into the national spotlight. His photograph for Calvin Klein of Olympic athlete Tom Hintnaus in white briefs is an iconic image. He photographed the winter 2006 Ralph Lauren Collection.

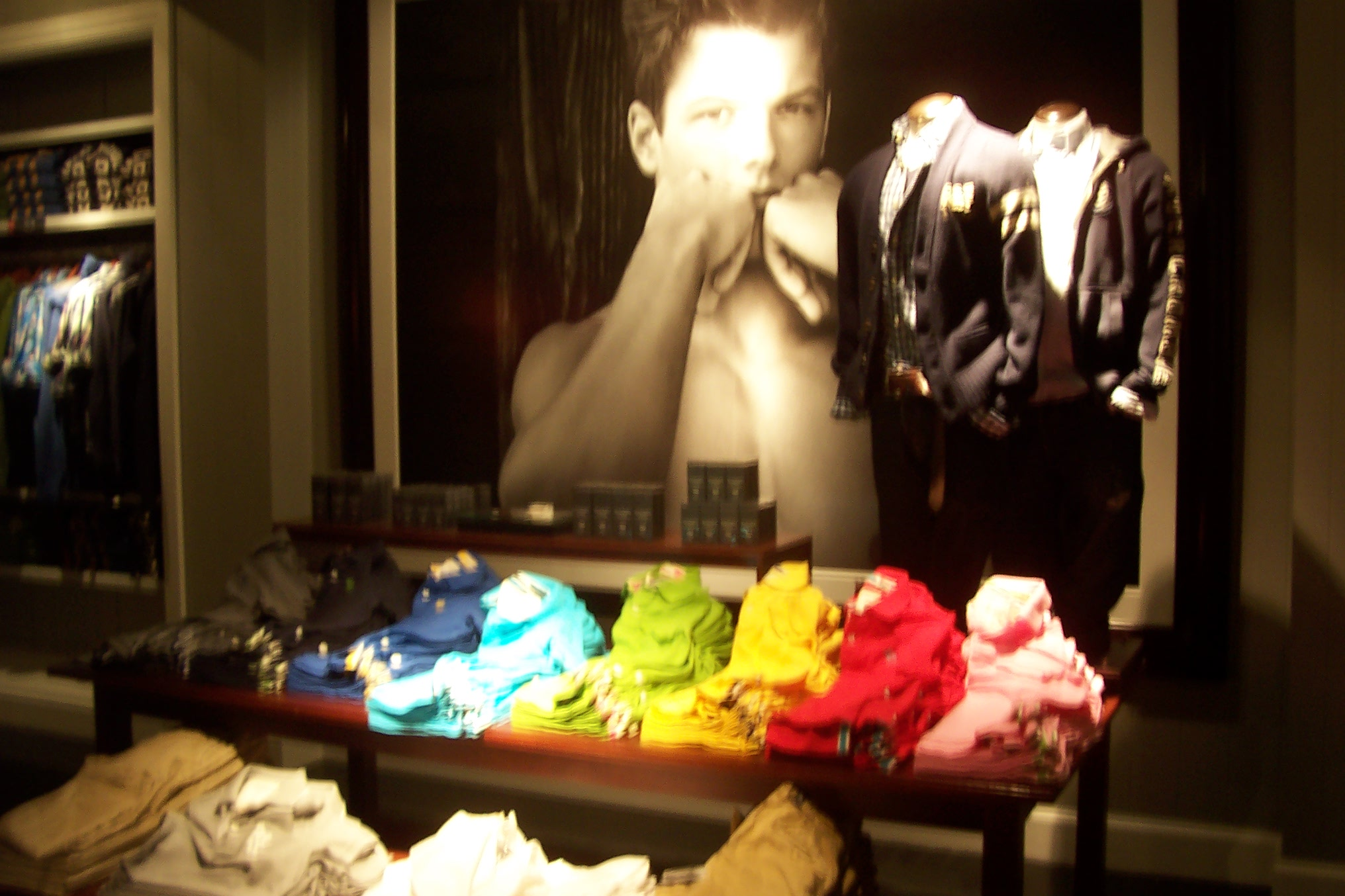
A Weber photograph in the background on display at an Abercrombie and Fitch store

Some of Weber's earliest fashion photography appeared in the SoHo Weekly News and featured a spread of men wearing only underwear. The photos became the center of controversy and Weber was told by some that he would never find work as a fashion photographer again. This reputation stuck with him as he says: "I don't really work editorially in a large number of magazines because a lot of magazines don't want my kind of photographs. It's too risky for them."

After doing photo shoots for and of famous people (many of whom were featured in Andy Warhol's Interview magazine), Weber made short films of teenage boxers (Broken Noses), his beloved pet dogs, and later, a longer film entitled Chop Suey. He directed Let's Get Lost, a 1988 documentary about jazz trumpeter Chet Baker.

Weber's photographs are occasionally in color; however, most are in black and white or shades of a tone. They appear in compilations in books including A House is Not a Home, as well as Bear Pond and Gentle Giants. The latter two are books of his photographs of his pet dogs.

Weber began collaborating with crooner Chris Isaak in the mid-1980s, photographing Isaak in 1986 for his second album, Chris Isaak. In 1988, Weber photographed a shirtless Isaak in bed for a fashion spread in Rolling Stone. Isaak appeared in Let's Get Lost and Weber has directed a music video for Isaak. Weber photographed Harry Connick, Jr. for his 1991 album Blue Light, Red Light. In 1993, Weber photographed singer-songwriter Jackson Browne for his 1993 album I'm Alive.

His ad campaigns include projects for Calvin Klein, Ralph Lauren, Pirelli, Abercrombie & Fitch, Revlon, Miu Miu, Armani, Louis Vuitton and Gianni Versace. His editorial work has appeared in Vogue, GQ, Vanity Fair, Elle, Life, Interview, and Rolling Stone magazines.

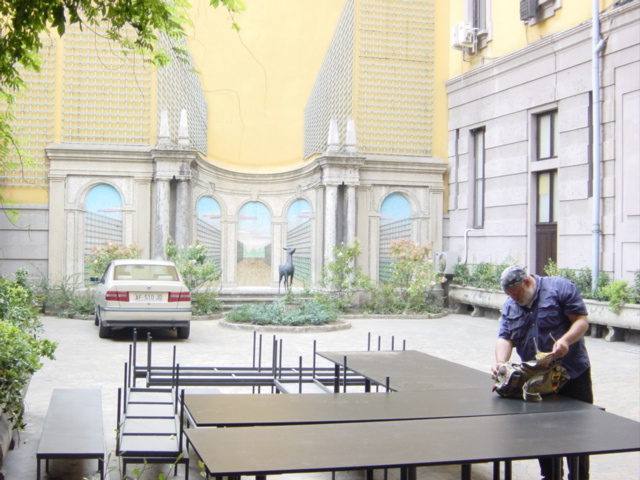
Weber at Condé Nast publishing house in Milan

=== Museums and libraries ===
Weber exhibits his work in prominent museums around the world, often working closely with the curator and art director Dimitri Levas to realize his vision. Weber's most recent solo shows include Far From Home at Dallas Contemporary (2016), Detroit: Bruce Weber at the Detroit Institute of Arts (2012), and Haiti/Little Haiti (2010) at the Museum of Contemporary Art in North Miami.

== Filmmaking ==
Weber's cinematic works—including his five feature-length films—often begin with a photo sitting. "All my films begin from finding someone I want to take a photograph of", Weber told The Sunday Times of London in 2008.

Broken Noses (1987)

While he was photographing the Olympic hopefuls for Interview in 1984, Weber met Andy Minsker, a young boxer from Oregon, and started interviewing him on camera. While he originally intended to make a short to accompany an exhibition he was opening in Paris, Weber became very excited when he reviewed the dailies and decided to continue the story. Broken Noses (1987), the resulting feature documentary, was nominated for the Grand Jury Award at Sundance in 1988.

Let's Get Lost (1988)

As Weber was completing work on Broken Noses, he met the jazz trumpeter and vocalist Chet Baker and began filming him, again with a mind to creating a short film based on their portrait sitting. But filming with Baker continued right through the presentation of Broken Noses in Cannes that year—with Weber ultimately assembling the footage of travel, recording sessions, and interviews into his second feature, Let's Get Lost (1988). The film debuted in Venice (where it won the Cinecritica award) and was subsequently nominated for a Grand Jury Award at Sundance, and for an Oscar for Best Documentary Feature. Filming took a year with Weber approaching it, as he told The Times of London, "like his [Baker's] interpretation of a song, open-ended, not lyrical or strict." The film features clips of Baker "in his prime in the 1950s ... combined with his drug-damaged incarnation in the film's present day: gaunt and spaced out but still striking." Baker, Weber said, "was like a geyser in a national park. Exploding up and raining and raining back down, falling apart on everyone."

Chop Suey (2001)

Chop Suey, a kaleidoscopic portrait of the wrestler Peter Johnson, was released in 2001. The Sunday Times of London reviewed it as "an aesthetic autobiography, in which he ruminates on some of his heroes and inspirations." According to a New York Times review at the time the film "moves easily between video and film and between black-and-white and color as Mr. Weber explores the world around him, a world that he finds full of beauty and erotic possibility. One of his most engaging discoveries is the 91-year-old Sir Wilfred, who as a young desert explorer made photographs of Bedouin tribesman that prefigure Mr. Weber's own work."

A Letter to True (2004)

Weber released the impressionistic anti-war film A Letter to True in 2004, in the aftermath of 9/11, and addressed to one of Weber's beloved golden retrievers." The film is an 'audiovisual scrapbook' In a review of the film The Sunday Times of London details how Weber rhapsodises over some of his favourite people, memories and ideas. (He) is a shameless old softie for whom dogs are emblematic of a happy home, (and)‘cherishes domestic security amid the fear created by the…attacks."

The Treasure of His Youth (2022)

Weber's fifth feature-length film focuses on the prominent Italian photojournalist Paolo Di Paolo, who was 94 when Weber began shooting the documentary.

Short films

His work-in-progress Robert Mitchum feature, Nice Girls Don't Stay for Breakfast was screened at the New York Film Festival in 2017. He has also directed seven short films: Beauty Brothers, Parts I-IV (1987), Backyard Movie (1991), Gentle Giants (1994), The Teddy Boys of the Edwardian Drape Society (1995), Wine and Cupcakes (2007), The Boy Artist (2008), and Liberty City is Like Paris to Me (2009).

== Sexual assault allegations ==
In December 2017, model Jason Boyce sued Weber in New York State Supreme Court, claiming sexual assault, including inappropriate touching and kissing during a 2014 casting session. The suit also targets Jason Kanner of Soul Artist Management, which managed Boyce when the alleged assault took place, and Little Bear Inc., the production company operated by Weber's companion, Nan Bush. A second model, Mark Ricketson, came forward in December 2017 alleging similar claims and joined Boyce's lawsuit against Weber.

Weber has denied the allegations, stating to The New York Times that the allegations were "untrue" and that he had "never touched anyone inappropriately".

In January 2018, The New York Times detailed sexual assault allegations by 15 male models against Weber.

In January 2019, it was reported that Weber asked to dismiss the original suit by Jason Boyce, with evidence provided that the model sent him racy photos and texts prior to and after the shoots.

By 2020, the Plaintiffs' cases against Weber began to face apparent setbacks, and in June 2020, Lisa Bloom, a high-powered harassment claims lawyer representing Weber's accusers in various suits, was ordered to pay Weber $28,000 in legal costs after Boyce refused to answer certain questions at a deposition.

By September 2021, the three cases against Weber were each either dismissed or settled for undisclosed sums.

On April 3, 2024, The Hollywood Reporter published an interview on Alan Ritchson wherein the Reacher star comments on prior allegations against Weber and Mario Testino reported by The New York Times:

Some of the stories were just like mine. I was just starting to build a platform and get my voice in the business, and I wondered, "Should I say something?" Because all of the stories that those models were telling were my own. It's all true.

== Personal life ==
Weber is married to Nan Bush who is also his agent and one of his collaborators.

In a 2002 interview he said, "I've had a lot of great romances. Men and women, I mean I feel like I can fall in love almost every day. I feel sorry for people who don't feel that."

He has lived in Miami since 1998.

== Films ==
Year	Title	Length	Cast
1987	Broken Noses	75:00	Andy Minsker
1987	Beauty Brothers (Part I-IV)	12:26	Paul Dillon, Brian Dillon, Tim Dillon, Rodney Harvey, Maya Oloe
1988	Let's Get Lost	119:25	Chet Baker, Chris Isaak, William Claxton, Flea, Lisa Marie, Rodney Harvey
1991	Backyard Movie	8:55	
1994	Gentle Giants	14:35	
1995	The Teddy Boys of the Edwardian Drape Society	3:45	Tobey Maguire
2000	Chop Suey	94:00	Peter Johnson, Robert Mitchum, Diana Vreeland, Frances Faye, Jan-Michael Vincent
2003	A Letter to True	78:00	Julie Christie (narrator), Marianne Faithfull (narrator), Dirk Bogarde, Elizabeth Taylor, Paul Smith, Tully Jensen
2006	The Legend of True	11:35	
2006	A Tribute To The Delta Society	2:23	
2006	Best Friends	3:44	
2007	Wine and Cupcakes	12:10	Angela McCluskey, Paul Cantelon
2008	Looking for Chet, Again, In All The Familiar Places	25:00	
2008	The Boy Artist	9:00	
2008	You Feel Me?	3:36	
2009	Liberty City Is Like Paris To Me	16:00	
2014	Iris	79:00	Iris Apfel
2022	The Treasure of His Youth: The Photographs of Paolo Di Paolo	105:00	Paolo Di Paolo
	'All-American' Documentary Series		(Work-in-progress)
	Nice Girls Don't Stay For Breakfast: Robert Mitchum Documentary, Paolo Di Paolo Documentary (Work-in-progress)		(Work-in-progress)
	CZ Guest Documentary project		(Work in progress)

=== Music videos ===
In 1990, Weber directed the music video for the Pet Shop Boys single "Being Boring". He filmed a party with a diverse group of models. The video was filmed in one day by two film crews in a house on Long Island. Content including male and female nudity prevented the video from being played on MTV in the United States. In 1996 he directed the video for the Pet Shop Boys single "Se a vida é (That's the Way Life Is)" on location in a Wet 'n' Wild, a water park near Orlando, Florida. In 2002, he again directed a Pet Shop Boys video, for the song "I Get Along" from the album Release. Weber filmed this video on location at his own Little Bear studio in New York City. He also directed the music video for the Chris Isaak song "Blue Spanish Sky".

Year	Song title	Length	Artist	Album
1988	Everything Happens to Me	3:42	Chet Baker	Let's Get Lost (Soundtrack album)
1990	Being Boring	4:55	Pet Shop Boys	Behaviour
1991	Blue Spanish Sky	4:13	Chris Isaak	Wicked Game
1996	Se a vida é (That's the Way Life Is)	4:50	Pet Shop Boys	Bilingual
2002	I Get Along	5:46	Pet Shop Boys	Release
2002	Light My Fire	3:44	Will Young	From Now On

== Bibliography ==
=== Books and monographs ===
Year	Title	Publisher	Genre
1977	Looking Good: A Guide For Men	Hawthorn Books (U.S.)	by Charles Hicks; all pictures by Weber
1978	Etre Beau: Un Guide Pour Les Hommes	Guy Authier (France)	French edition of Looking Good: A Guide For Men
1983	Bruce Weber	Twelvetrees Press (U.S.)	First monograph
1983	The Sun and the Shade; Florida Photography, 1885–1983	Norton Gallery; West Palm Beach (U.S.)	Exhibition catalog for an exhibit curated by Weber
1984	Interview Magazine	Andy Warhol/Interview (U.S.)	Special edition on American Athletes of the 1984 Olympic Games; all pictures by Weber
1984	Photographs Of Athletes	Olympus Gallery (U.K.)	Published upon the exhibition held in London (U.K.) at the Olympus Gallery
1986	O Rio De Janeiro	Alfred A. Knopf (U.S.)	Monograph
1986	Summer Diary 1986	Condé Nast (Vogue Italia) (Italy)	Special insert of the Italian magazine Per Lui; all pictures by Weber
1987	The Andy Book	Doeisha Co., Ltd. (Japan)	Monograph on Andy Minsker, star of Broken Noses
1987	Bruce Weber	Idea Books (Italy)	Catalogue of the exhibition held in Venice (Italy) at Palazzo Fortuny
1989	Bruce Weber	Alfred A. Knopf (U.S.)	Monograph
1990	Bear Pond	Bulfinch Press (U.S.)	Monograph
1990	Great Contemporary Nudes; 1978–1990	C-Two Gallery (Japan)	Published upon the exhibition held in Tokyo. (Box containing three books dedicated to the three participating photographers, Weber, Robert Mapplethorpe and Herb Ritts.)
1991	Bruce Weber	Fahey Klein Gallery; Parco Exposure Gallery (U.S. / Japan)	Published upon the exhibition held in: New York at the Fahey Klein Gallery and in Tokyo at the Parco Exposure Gallery
1991	Calvin Klein Jeans	Condé Nast (Vogue); Calvin Klein (U.S.)	Speciale insert of Vanity Fair, all pictures by Weber
1991	Bear Pond	Treville	Monograph
1992	Hotel Room With A View: Photographs by Bruce Weber	Smithsonian Institution (U.S.)	"Photographers at Work", A Smithsonian Series
1994	Gentle Giants	Bulfinch Press (U.S.)	Monograph dedicated to the Newfoundland dogs
1994	No Valet Parking	Photology (Italy)	published upon the exhibition held in Milan (Italy) at the Galleria Photology
1996	A House Is Not A Home	Bulfinch Press (U.S.)	Monograph
1996	You Can Take The Boy Out Of Vietnam; But You Can't Take Vietnam Out Of The Boy	Condé Nast (Vogue Italia) (Italy)	Special insert of the Italian magazine L'Uomo Vogue published upon the exhibition Vietnam, Versace, Viaggi, Weber, held in Milan at Palazzo Reale
1997	Branded Youth and Other Stories	Bulfinch Press (U.S.)	Monograph
1997	Pirelli Calendar	Pirelli (Italy)	1998 Calendar, starring: Patricia Arquette • Georgina Grenville • Daryl Hannah • Shalom Harlow • Eva Herzigova • Kirsty Hume • Elaine Irwin Mellencamp • Milla Jovovich •Kiara Kabukuru • Tanga Moreau • Carolyn Murphy • Rachel Roberts • Stella Tennant and B.B. King • Bono • Paul Cadmus • Francesco Clemente • Kris Kristofferson • John Malkovich • Ewan McGregor • Dermot Mulroney • Dan O'Brien • Sonny Rollins • Kelly Slater • Fred Ward
1998	The Chop Suey Club	Arena Editions (U.S.)	Monograph on Peter Johnson
2000	Stern Magazine	TeNeues Publishing; Stern Portfolio (Germany)	Spezial Fotografie Portfolio Number 22
2001	Roadside America	TeNeues Publishing; Stern Portfolio (Germany)	Monograph No. 22 of the "Stern Portfolio" series
2001	Pirelli Calendar	Pirelli (Italy)	2003 Calendar, starring: Alessandra Ambrosio • Mariacarla Boscono • Sophie Dahl • Yamila Diaz-Rahi • Isabeli Fontana • Bridget Hall • Filippa Hamilton • Heidi Klum • Karolína Kurková • Jessica Miller • Sienna Miller • Rana Raslan • Eva Riccobono • Lisa Seiffert • Valentina Stilla • Natalia Vodianova and Marcelo Boldrini • Stéphane Ferrara • Tomasino Ganesh • Alessandro Gassman • Jak Krauszer • Ajay Lamas • Richie Lamontagne • Enrico Lo Verso • Davide Battista • Massimo Boninsegna • Giuseppe Conte • Luca di Marino • Pasquale Malzone • Raffaele Marciano • Alberto Perini • Serafino Roncacè
2003	Hope: A Letter To True	Condé Nast (Vogue Italia) (Italy)	Special insert of the Italian magazine L'Uomo Vogue
2004	Stern Magazine	TeNeues Publishing; Stern Portfolio (Germany)	Spezial Fotografie Portfolio Number 38 "Home Is Where The Heart Is"
2005	Blood Sweat And Tears: Or How I Stopped Worrying And Learned to Love Fashion	TeNeues Publishing (Germany)	Monograph
2005	Filmography	Kinetique Tokyo (Japan)	Published upon the exhibition held in Tokyo at the Original True Gallery
2006	Kate Moss; Is The Girl That Got Away	Condé Nast (Vogue Paris) (France)	Special insert of the French magazine Vogue Hommes International on Kate Moss
2007	Sex And Words	Visionaire (U.S.)	Monograph
2009	Roberto Bolle; An Athlete In Tights	TeNeues Publishing (Germany)	Monograph on Roberto Bolle
2009	Cartier; I Love You	TeNeues Publishing (Germany)	Celebrating 100 Years of Cartier in America
2010	Standing Tall: Portraits of the Haitian Community in Miami, 2003–2010	Museum of Contemporary Art North Miami (U.S.)	Published for the exhibition held in Miami at the Museum of Contemporary Art
2012	All-American Volume 12: A Book Of Lessons	TeNeues Publishing (Germany)	12th book of the "All-American" series
2013	All-American Volume 13: Born Ready	TeNeues Publishing (Germany)	13th book of the "All-American" series
2014	Detroit Has Been Good To Me	Little Bear Press (U.S.)	Monograph
2014	All-American Volume 14: Affairs of the Heart	TeNeues Publishing (Germany)	14th book of the "All-American" series
2015	All-American Volume 15: Leap of Faith	TeNeues Publishing (Germany)	15th book of the "All-American" series
2019	Holiday Magazine; The Egypt Issue	Holiday Magazine (France)	Photography capturing the essence of Egypt's people and culture

=== Little Bear Press ===
Bruce and his wife, Nan, began the publishing imprint Little Bear Press where, in addition to monographs and exhibition catalogs, they have published an independent arts journal titled All-American. While some volumes have been published by external publishers, the bulk of the series has been published by Little Bear Press. The All-American publishes works by artists, photographers, essayists, poets and other personalities. The subjects of the journal are sometimes already well known but just as often, the participants and subjects of All-American are noteworthy not for fame, but because their stories or accomplishments reveal something that Weber believes will resonate with readers on a deeper and more personal level. His dedication to the All-American project is motivated by a desire to connect, inspire, and support the work of emerging artists.

Year	Title	Publisher	Genre
1988	A Film Journal by Bruce Weber	Little Bear Films (U.S.)	Published in conjunction with the feature film Let's Get Lost
1990	Sam Shepard by Bruce Weber	Little Bear Press (U.S.)	Monograph on Sam Shepard starring Jessica Lange
1999	Shu Fly	Little Bear Press (U.S.)	Monograph
2001	All-American	Little Bear Press (U.S.)	1st book of the "All-American" series
2002	All-American II: Short Stories	Little Bear Press (U.S.)	2nd book of the "All-American" series
	Mothers Days: Imogen Cunningham	Little Bear Press (U.S.)	A collection of works mostly taken in the 1920s and 30s by female photographer Imogine Cunningham.
2003	All-American III: Family Albums	Little Bear Press (U.S.)	3rd book of the "All-American" series
2003	Thank Your Lucky Stars: John R. Hamilton	Little Bear Press (U.S.)	A behind the scenes look at Hollywood celebrity by Hollywood photography veteran, John R. Hamilton. Foreword by Peter Bogdanovich
2003	Like a Moth: Jim French	Little Bear Press (U.S.)	The pioneering male-figure photographer Jim French's collection of 1972 nude studies of model David Skrivanek
2004	All-American IV: Otherworldly	Little Bear Press (U.S.)	4th book of the "All-American" series
2005	All-American V: Is Love Enough?	Little Bear Press (U.S.)	5th book of the "All-American" series
2006	All-American VI: Larger Than life	Little Bear Press (U.S.)	6th book of the "All-American" series
2006	People I May Know Johnny Dark	Little Bear Press (U.S.)	Part memoir/part travelogue by Johnny Dark
2007	All-American VII: 'Til I Get It Right - An Anthem For The South	Little Bear Press (U.S.)	7th book of the "All-American" series
2007	Live Here, Rent Free	Little Bear Press (U.S.)	Monograph
2008	All-American VIII: Nature's Way	Little Bear Press (U.S.)	8th book of the "All-American" series
2009	All-American IX: A Near-Perfect World	Little Bear Press (U.S.)	9th book of the "All-American" series
2010	All-American X: Written In The Stars	Little Bear Press (U.S.)	10th book of the "All-American" series
2011	All-American Volume 11: Just Life	Little Bear Press (U.S.)	11th book of the "All-American" series
2014	Detroit Has Been Good to Me	Little Bear Press (U.S.)	Monograph
2016	All-American Volume 16: Wild Blue Yonder	Little Bear Press (U.S.)	16th book of the "All-American" series
2016	Far From Home	Little Bear Press (U.S.)	Dallas Contemporary
2017	All-American Volume 17: Glory Be	Little Bear Press (U.S.)	17th book of the "All-American" Series
2018	All-American Volume 18: Facing The World	Little Bear Press (U.S.)	18th book of the "All-American" series
2018	Azzedine Bruce Joe	Little Bear Press (U.S.)	Foundation Azzedine Alaia
2018	"Nice Girls Don't Stay for Breakfast" Film Journal	Little Bear Films (France only)	La Rabbia
2019	All-American Volume 19 No Small Thing, Desire	Little Bear Press (U.S.)	19th book of the All-American series
2020	All-American Volume 20: Coming Home	Little Bear Press (U.S.)	20th book of the All-American series
2021	All-American Volume 21 Time Will Tell	Little Bear Press (U.S.)	21st book of the All-American series
2022	All-American Volume 22: The Towering Feeling	Little Bear Press (U.S.)	22nd book of the All-American series
2023	All-American Volume 23: Let's Take an Old Fashioned Walk	Little Bear Press (U.S.)	23rd book of the All-American series

=== Other books ===
- Rolling Stone: The Photographs, Simon & Schuster (1989)
- Pictures Of Peace, Alfred A. Knopf (1991)
- Bruce Hainley and David Rimanelli, Shock of the Newfoundland: Bruce Weber's canine camera, "Artforum International 33" (April 1995), pp. 78–81.
- Il Tempo E La Moda, Skira; Exhibition Catalogue: "Biennale Firenze" (1996)
- Gianni Versace, Rock and Royalty, Abbeville (February 1997)
- David Leddick, The Male Nude, New York: Taschen (1998)
- Pirelli Calendar 1964–2004, Rizzoli (2004)
- Heel To Heal (2004)
- Paintings of New York, 1800–1950 (2005)
- Monica Bellucci, Rizzoli (2010)
- Kate Moss, Rizzoli (2012)
