= Paola =

- Pronunciation: Italian: [ˈpaːola]
- Gender: Female
- Language: Italian

Other names
- See also: Paula (given name)

Paola is a female given name, the Italian form of the name Paula. In Greek it is Polina. Notable people with the name include:

== People ==
=== In arts and entertainment ===
- Angelica Paola Ibba (born 2001), know professionally as Angie, Italian singer-songwriter
- Paola Beatriz (born 1984), Brazilian activist
- Paola Del Medico (born 1950), Swiss singer
- Paola Di Benedetto (born 1995), Italian television presenter, radio personality, television personality, showgirl and model
- Paola & Chiara, pop music duo consisting of two sisters born in Milan, Italy
- Paola Ferrari (journalist) (born 1960), Italian journalist and television presenter
- Paola Foka (born 1982), Greek singer
- Paola Gaviria, known as Power Paola (born 1977), Colombian-Ecuadorian cartoonist
- Paola Iezzi (born 1974), Italian singer-songwriter, record producer and television personality
- Paola Lázaro (born 1994), Puerto Rican actress and playwright
- Paola Marella (1963–2024), Italian television presenter
- Paola Masino (1908–1989), Italian writer
- Paola Oliveira, Brazilian actress
- Paola Rey (born 1979), Colombian actress
- Paola Rojas (born 1976), Mexican television news personality
- Paola Turbay (born 1970), Colombian actress

=== In politics ===
- Paola Balducci (born 1949), Italian politician and jurist
- Paola Boscaini (born 1954), Italian politician
- Paola Concia (born 1963), Italian politician
- Paola De Micheli (born 1973), Italian politician
- Paola Deiana (born 1985), Italian politician
- Paola Pabón (born 1978) Ecuadorian politician and feminist
- Paola Pinna (born 1974), Italian politician
- Paola Pisano (born 1977) Italian academic and politician
- Paola Severino (born 1948), Italian politician
- Paola Taverna (born 1969), Italian politician

=== In sports ===
- Paola Borović – Croatian long and triple jumper (born 1995)
- Paola Cardullo (born 1982), Italian volleyball player
- Paola Cavallino (born 1977), Italian swimmer
- Paola Croce (born 1978), Italian volleyball player
- Paola Duguet (born 1987), Colombian swimmer
- Paola Ferrari (basketball) (born 1985), Paraguayan player
- Paola Ogechi Egonu (born 1998), Italian volleyball player
- Paola Espinosa (born 1986), Mexican diver
- Paola Longoria (born 1989), Mexican racquetball player
- Paola Moro (born 1952), Italian long-distance runner
- Paola Mosca Barberis (born 1977), Italian alpine skier
- Paola Paggi (born 1976), Italian volleyball player
- Paola Pereira da Silva (born 2003), Brazilian footballer
- Paola Pezzo (born 1969), Italian mountain bike racer
- Paola Reis (born 1999), Brazilian BMX rider
- Paola Suárez (born 1976), Argentinian tennis player
- Paola Vukojicic (born 1974), Argentinian field hockey player

=== In other fields ===
- Paola De Luca (born 1966), Italian designer
- Paola del Medico (born 1950), Italian singer
- Paola Drigo (1876–1938), Italian writer
- Paola Flocchini, Italian-Canadian computer scientist
- Paola Grosson (1866–1954), Italian journalist, writer, activist
- Paola Leone, Italian biologist
- Paola Loreti, Italian mathematician
- Paola Voci, academic specialising in Chinese language and culture
- Queen Paola of Belgium (born 1937), Belgian queen consort
- Paola Nogales-Ascarrunz (born 1994), Bolivian biologist credited with discovering the tilcayo

=== Surname ===
- Andrea De Paola (born 1990), Italian footballer
- Danna Paola (born 1995), Mexican actress and singer
- Suzanne Paola (born 1956), American poet and author

== See also ==
- Paola (Maltese: Raħal Ġdid), a town in Malta
- Paolo
