= Pietro Baldancoli =

Italian painter

Pietro Baldancoli (December 7, 1834 – 1901) was an Italian painter.

== Biography ==
He was born in Florence, where he initially studied ornamentation with Vincenzo Saccardi, and at the age of 12 years, he apprenticed with Alessandro Maffei at the Academy of Fine Arts of Florence. At the age of 14, his right arm was amputated during a hunting accident. He then began to paint with his left arm, and by eighteen years of age, began to paint ceiling decorations. He studied figure painting with Paolo Sarti. In 1857, Baldancoli moved to Livorno to paint various ceilings in the Palazzi Papudoff and Maurocordato. Returning to Florence, he decorated the rooms for Conte Fossombroni with a design that recalled the Florentine Renaissance.

== Works ==
He also decorated the Casino Borghesi, painting the walls in chiaroscuro and the ceiling in color. He helped decorate the Palazzo Cecchi near the Villino Favard; the facade in graffito for the Palazzo of Prince Corsini in Corso de'Tintori; the great hall of the Villino Lemmi in Via della Scala, and in this same Villino, several ceilings in chiaroscuro, in a diversity of styles baroque, Gothic, Pompeian, and fantasy; several ceilings in the first floor of Palazzo Crispi in Via della Scala. He painted the dining room, principal hall, salotto and private rooms in the Palazzo Salviati in Via do'Pinti (commission by Count Gastone di Larderel); a facade in graffito in Via Cimabue; the ceilings for the Teatro Alfieri, Teatro di Campi, and Teatro di Signa; two rooms and a gallery in the Palazzo Stibbert; two ceilings in the style of Poccetti in Pompeian style for the Palazzo della Banca Nazionale; the ceiling of the Loggetta of the Studio Gordigiani; three rooms of the Palazzo Matteini near Via Niccolini (figures on the ceiling in chiaroscuro 1400s style were painted by Federico Andreotti).

He painted several rooms of Palazzo Conti at the Viale in Curva; the ceiling of the entrance to the Museum of Fine Arts of Bern (1878); two ceilings, the entry and the vestibule of the Museum of Natural History of Bern (1880, likely destroyed); several decorative works for the Villa Gordigiani in Rome; frieze painted in chiaroscuro for the studio of the painter Gelli; several works al Palazzo Philipson in Piazza dell' Indipendenza, frieze for the studio of the painter Federico Andreotti; several works al Palazzo Ferrari-Corbelli in Piazza dell' Indipendenza (the figures in the Salon are by painter Ernesto Bellandi); the graffito of Palazzo Pisani, and the rooms in the second floor; various works for the Palazzo James in Via dell' Orivolo; a chapel in a style recalling 1300s in the Palazzo Pestellini in Via Ricasoli; ceiling and walls of the studio of Stefano Ussi, painted in an Arabic style; many other works for Villino Sforni in Via Pier Capponi, for Villino Aulani, and at the Villa Stibbert (1889).

He was named honorary professor of the Royal Academy of Fine Arts of Florence in 1884 and correspondent academic in 1888.
