= John R. Hamilton =

John R. Hamilton may refer to:

- John R. Hamilton (photographer) (1923–1997), American photographer
- John R. Hamilton (architect), English-American architect
- John Ronald Hamilton (1871–1940), New Zealand politician
