= Paolantonio =

Paolantonio is an Italian surname derived from the given names Paolo and Antonio. Notable people with the surname include:

- Alessandro Di Paolantonio (born 1992), Italian footballer
- Sal Paolantonio, American sports reporter

== See also ==
- Paolantoni
