= Bear Pond (book) =

1990 book by Reynolds Price

- Author: Bruce Webber, Reynolds Price
- Publisher: Little, Brown and Company
- Publication date: 1990

Bear Pond, published by Little, Brown and Company in 1990, is an "infamous book" of nude photography by Bruce Weber and poetry by Reynolds Price.
