= DiPaolo =

DiPaolo is a surname of Italian origin. Notable people with the surname include:

- Anthony DiPaolo (born 1958), American businessman
- Dante DiPaolo (1926–2013), American dancer
- Frank DiPaolo (1906–2013), American politician
- Ilio DiPaolo (1926–1995), Italian professional wrestler
- Joey DiPaolo (born 1979), American AIDS activist
- Nick DiPaolo (born 1962), American stand-up comedian, actor and writer

== See also ==
- Di Paolo, variant
