= Leopoldo Maggi =

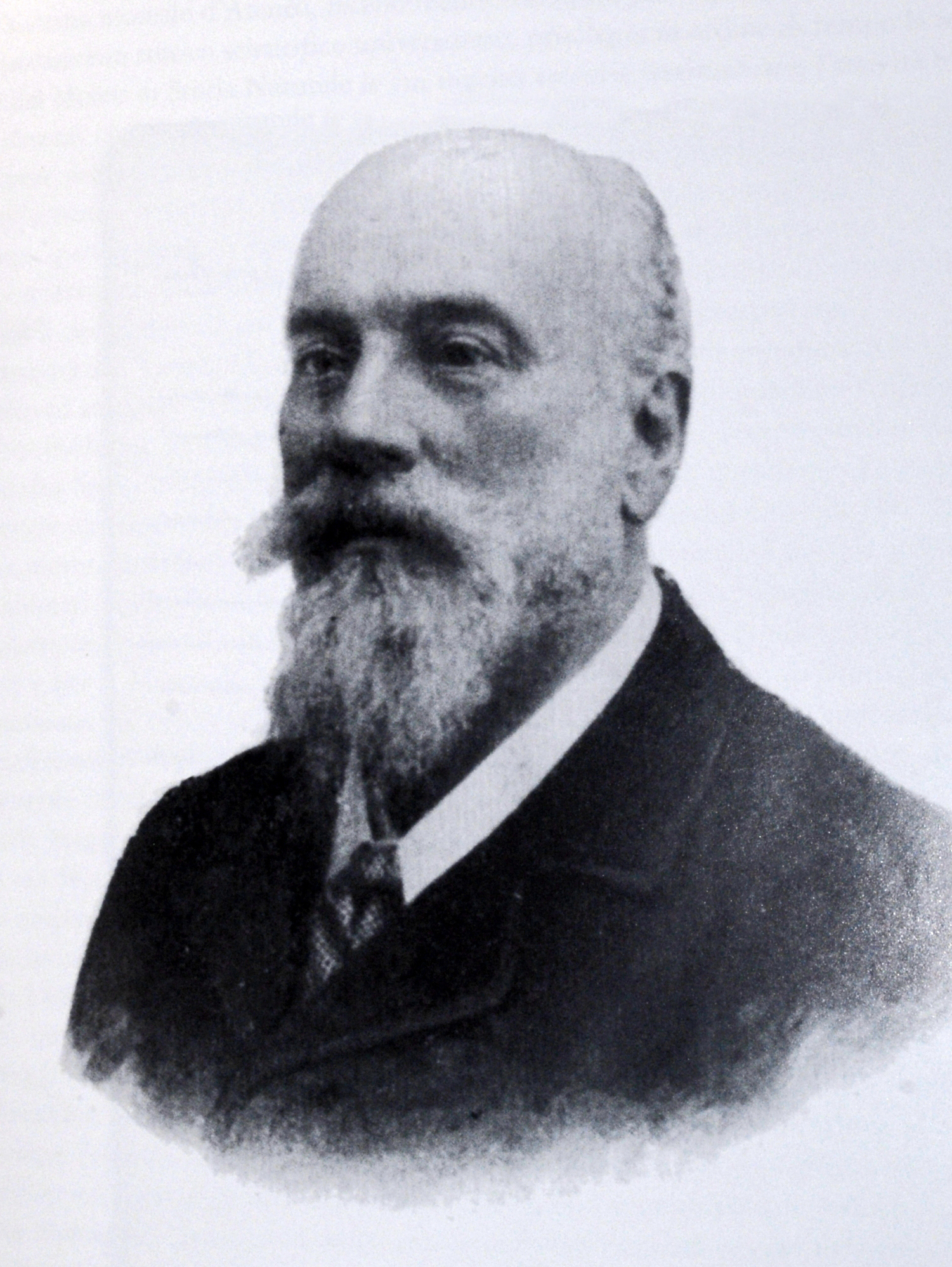
- Born: 15 May 1840; Rancio Valcuvia, near Varese
- Died: 7 March 1905 (aged 64); Pavia
- Scientific career
- Fields: naturalist

Leopoldo Maggi (Rancio Valcuvia, near Varese, 15 May 1840 – Pavia, 7 March 1905) was an Italian physician, craniologist and naturalist.

He completed his studies at the University of Pavia. In 1863, he obtained two degrees: in Natural Sciences and in Medicine and Surgery, and became assistant first to Paolo Panceri (1833-1877), the teacher of several other outstanding Italian zoologists of the end of the 19th century and then to Giuseppe Balsamo Crivelli. In 1864, he was appointed lecturer in Mineralogy and Geology at Pavia, where from 1874 he held the professorship of Zoology and Comparative Anatomy. When zoology became a separate subject in 1875, he held the chair of Comparative Anatomy and Physiology, occupying this until his death.

For years, he devoted himself to biology and especially to comparative anatomy, but also to Mineralogy, Osteology, Prehistoric archaeology, craniology and Protistology.

He was the first Italian to pay attention to Protozoa and his studies on Protozoa and Protistology are of considerable importance, although conditioned by the belief in spontaneous generation and Monera and by the adherence to the doctrines of Ernst Haeckel. The Haeckel and Maggi theories declined at the beginning of 1900.

The studies of Leopoldo Maggi, at first eminently descriptive with the discovery of numerous taxa, had a rapid evolution in the medical field and converged in bacteriology. Also noteworthy are his research on the skull, conducted with comparative and evolutionary address. Many of his interpretations are nowadays outdated, but the descriptive part remains valid.

== Works ==
- A proposito dei protisti cholerigeni(1885), I piccoli benefattori dell’umanita(1886),
- I microbi vantaggiosi per l'uomo (1888).
- Intorno alla determinazione della specie batteriche secondo Pflugge
- Nuovi orizzonti della protistologia medica (1884)
- Catalogo delle rocce della Valcuvia, in Atti della Società italiana di scienze naturali, XXI (1879), pp. 858–876;
- Cenni sulla costituzione geologica del territorio di Varese, in G.C. Bizzozzero, Varese e il suo territorio, Varese 1874, pp. 9–46;
- Di alcune soluzioni di coltura e loro sterilizzazione, ibid., XIX (1886), pp. 850–855;
- Gl'invisibili del Varesotto, in Boll. scientifico, III (1881), 3, pp. 91–95;
- Le idee dell'Haeckel intorno alla morfologia dell'anima, in Riv. di filosofia scientifica, I (1882), 4, pp. 436–445;
- L'Istituto di anatomia e fisiologia comparate e di protistologia della R. Università di Pavia, in Boll. scientifico, XXI (1899), pp. 120–127.
- Protistologia (1882) - U. Hoepli, Milano
- Sulla distinzione morfologica degli organi negli animali, in Rendiconti del R. Ist. lombardo di scienze e lettere, s. 2, XVIII (1885), pp. 481–491;
- Sull'analisi protistologica delle acque potabili, ibid., XIV (1881), pp. 621–626;
- Sull'esistenza dell'uomo in epoca terziaria, in Rendiconti del R. Ist. lombardo di scienze e lettere, s. 2, III (1870) pp. 223–230;
- Sull'influenza delle alte temperature nello sviluppo dei microbi, in Boll. scientifico, VI (1884), 3-4, pp. 77–115;
- Tecnica Protistologica (1895) - U. Hoepli, Milano

== Bibliography ==
- C. Jucci, Contributo dell'Università di Pavia al progresso della biologia naturalistica, in Discipline e maestri dell'ateneo pavese. Università di Pavia, 1361-196, pp. 109–151;
- C. Rovati, C. Violani – Leopoldo Maggi (1849-1905), una lezione per immagine – Università degli Studi di Pavia
- E. Artini, Comm. di L. M., in Rendiconti dell'Ist. lombardo di scienze e lettere, s. 2, XL (1907), pp. 88–97;
- E. Bonardi, Intorno ad alcuni punti del pensiero e dell'opera scientifica di L. M. di fronte all'attuale momento scientifico, ibid., XLVI (1913), pp. 591–600;
- G. Armocida - S. Contini - E. Vaccari - L. M. (1840-1905): un naturalista eclettico nella Lombardia del secondo Ottocento. Atti del Convegno, Cuveglio, 2002
- G. Cattaneo, L. M., in Monitore zoologico italiano, XVI (1905), pp. 78–84;
- G. Landucci, M. L., in Dictionnaire du Darwinisme et de l'évolution, a cura di P. Tort, II, Paris 1996, pp. 2757–2759;
- Rainer Brömer - Plastidules to humans : Leopoldo Maggi (1840-1905) and Ernst Haeckel's naturalist philosophy in the Kingdom of Italy : with an edition of Maggi's letters to Ernst Haeckel
