= Luca di Paolo da Matelica =

Italian painter (1435/1441–1491)

Luca di Paolo di Niccolo' da Matelica (c. 1435/1441 – 1491) was an Italian painter mainly active in Matelica in the Marche region.

== Life and career ==
The few details known of his life have only been collected in the 21st century. By 1455, he was an orphan under the care of his uncle. The 1462 polyptych of Ex-Pugin, a work that had found its way to the collection of English art collector Augustus Welby Pugin of Derby, England, is attributed to this artist. A panel from a larger 1462 polyptych, once attributed to Francesco di Gentile da Fabriano, depicting St Catherine and St Michael Archangel which once belonged to English art collector George Sitwell, has also been attributed to Luca by art historian Pietro Zampetti. One of these two polyptychs was displayed for some time at St. Mary's Church, Derby.

A Crucifixion and Stories of the True Cross, attributed to Luca, once displayed at the oratory of the Confraternity della Santa Croce, is now displayed at the Museo Piersanti in Matelica. Another of Luca's works, a Madonna and Child in Glory with St Jerome and St Francis (1488) is on display in the Musée du Petit Palais of Avignon. Virgin and Child with a Pomegranate, considered to be a collaborative work by Luca and Francesco, was owned by American art collector John G. Johnson till his death in 1917, when he bequeathed it to the Philadelphia Museum of Art. Annunciazione, Dio Padre benedicente; is also attributed to Luca and dated between 1475 and 1499. This painting was for some time on display at the Church of Annunciation in Cerreto d'Esi. Luca may or may not have been in contact with the painters Carlo Crivelli or Niccolò di Liberatore.
