= Palazzo Barbarigo Minotto =

Palace in Venice, Italy

Coordinates: 45.4317°N 12.3322°E

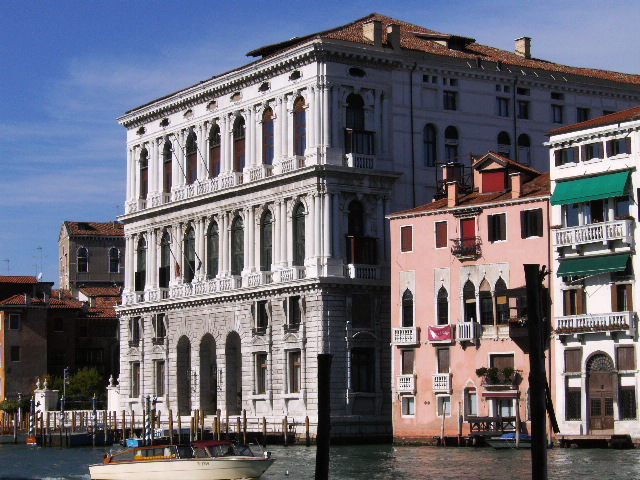
View of the Palazzo Corner and the Palazzo Barbarigo Minotto. The pink building in the middle is the Palazzo Barbarigo Minotto.

The Palazzo Barbarigo Minotto (also called Palazzo Minotto Barbarigo) is a 15th-century palace on the Grand Canal in Venice, northern Italy, next to the much larger Palazzo Corner. Built in the Venetian Gothic style, it was originally two palaces, Palazzo Barbarigo and Palazzo Minotto, later joined together. The Barbarigo palace was owned by the Barbarigo family for several centuries and was the birthplace of Gregorio Barbarigo, who once refused the Papal Crown. It was later owned by the Minotto and Martinengo families.

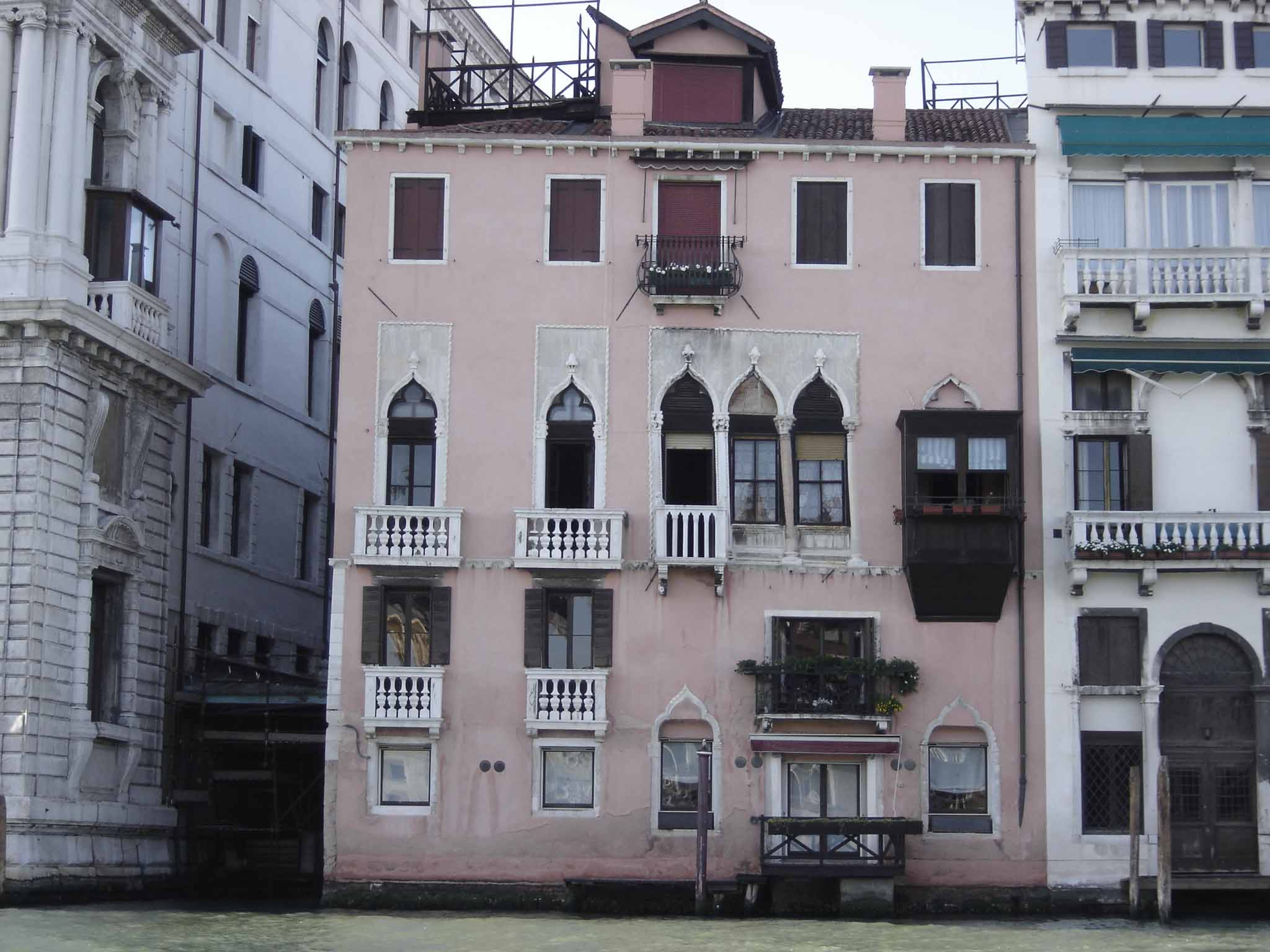
The facade of Palazzo Barbarigo-Minotto on the Grand Canal of Venice.

Three staterooms face the Grand Canal and another three face Rio Zaguri. In the first half of the 18th century frescoes and paintings by Giovanni Battista Tiepolo, Francesco Fontebasso and Carpoforo Tencalla were commissioned by Pietro Barbarigo. Its chapel has Louis XIV Style elm flooring inlaid with olive-root marquetry. The palace's doors, are in the same style, banded in walnut with bronze handles shaped as vine leaves. The floors of the staterooms are a blend of terrazzo paving and Venetian "pastellone" paving.

== Description ==
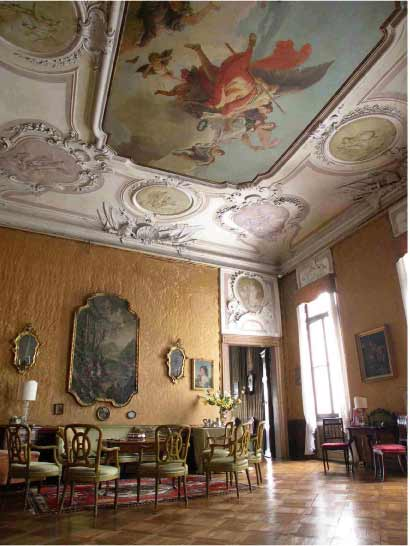
The so-called "Tiepolo's Room", almost entirely decorated by the Venetian Master.

The palace is actually formed by two different buildings, merged in the 17th century. The oldest part is a 15th-century Venetian-Gothic palace featuring 12th century Byzantine-style friezes. This was originally known as the Palazzo Minotto; the newer part, Palazzo Barbarigo, was built in the 17th century.

On the occasion of Gregorio Barbarigo's marriage with Caterina Sagredo in 1739, the greatest artists of the time were called to embellish the palace in both its parts, which had been unified by then. Among these guests were; Gianbattista Tiepolo, Francesco Fontebasso, Gerolamo Mengozzi Colonna, and Carpoforo Mazzetti.

In 1741 the Ferrarese quadraturist Mengozzi Colonna painted the domestic chapel located in a recess of the building and hidden by two wooden leaves. Around it a Louis XIV-style elm floor inlaid with olive-root and other wood marquetry. The following year Mengozzi Colonna contributed the Venetian terrazzo paving to the central hall or portego.

The palace's doors are Louis XIV style, banded in walnut and with bronze handles shaped as vine leaves.

Gianbattista Tiepolo started his work here in 1741, painting the grisailles and two of the overdoor paintings that frame the central canvas, "The triumph of Virtue and Nobility over Ignorance". The original oil painting is now part of Cà Rezzonico's collection and has been replaced here with a 20th-century copy.

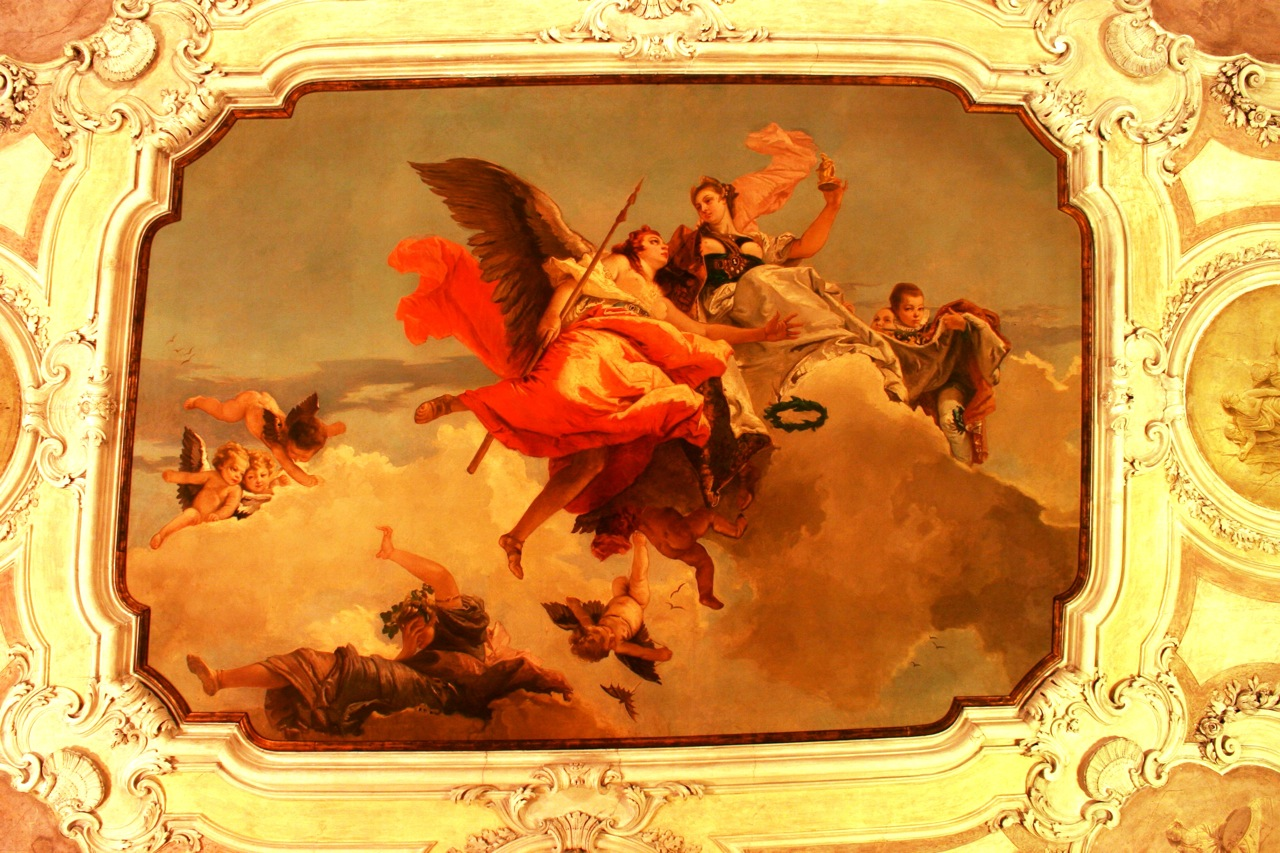
The 20th century copy of Tiepolo's "Triumph of Virtue over Ignorance" (1745), oil on canvas. The original painting is now part of Cà Rezzonico's collection.

The whole pictorial decoration represents the cultural interests of Gregorio and Caterina, freshly married. Four grisailles represent Sciences: History, Astronomy, Geography and Astrology. The other four represent the Arts: Painting, Sculpture, Music and Poetry. The frescoes in the overdoors depict Merit and Abundance. This whole cycle is influenced by the neoclassical trend that conquered the whole city during that period, through its ornamental motifs, ancient-looking sculptures, sarcophagi, amphorae and vases, together with the "Olympic grace" of its figures. The parlor is also known as "the room of Wisdom", since it exalts the commissioner's idea of the arts and sciences giving wealth and nobility.

The central oil on canvas was painted by Tiepolo in 1744-1745. Next to the two female figures representing Virtue and Nobility there is a young page holding a drape of their vest: it is probably a portrait of the painter's son, Giuseppe Maria. Behind him we notice another figure, supposedly a self-portrait of the artist himself. Ignorance, defeated, falls down dragging with her a winged genie who is holding a bat, allegory of Vice. This celebrative representation, dear to the masters of the house, is also an example of Tiepolo's artistic maturity, highly influenced by Veronese models.

Carpoforo Mazzetti, pupil of another Ticinese artist, Abbondio Stazio, molded the stuccos in the rocaille style alcove. The decorations originate from the central opening where the bed is placed, branching out on both sides to reach the doors, adorned with mirrors. Above them, the crest and its shield-carrying angels overlook the room.

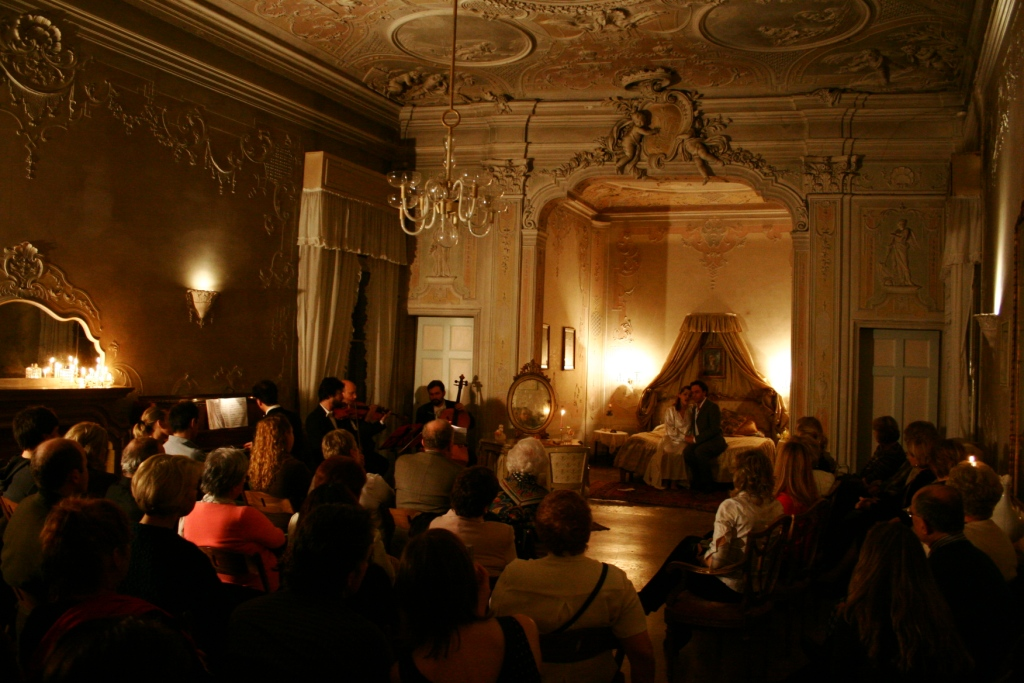
The Alcove with its rich stuccos, photographed during a performance of Verdi's "Traviata", by the ensemble of "Musica a Palazzo".

Mazzetti worked also on the dining room's stuccos, where he represented mythological scenes in pale colours and very realistic and colourful animals to adorn the ceiling.

Musica a Palazzo, a cultural association of classical musicians, has leased the piano nobile since 2005 and uses it for small-scale opera productions.

== See also ==
The Barbarigo family owned several other palaces in Venice which still bear their name, most notably the Palazzo Barbarigo. The others are Palazzo Barbarigo alla Maddalena, Palazzo Barbarigo della Terrazza, and Palazzo Barbarigo Nani Mocenigo.

== Sources ==
- Chiappini di Sorio, Ileana (1999). Stanze veneziane. Palazzi esclusivi e dimore segrete a Venezia. Vicenza: Balto.
- Elementi per la Ricostruzione dell'attività artistica di Gerolamo Mengozzi Colonna in "Bollettino dei Musei Civici Veneziani", 1983-1984.
- Piana Bistrot Annalisa, Ritornano a Palazzo Barbarigo i monocromi di GiambattistaTiepolo, in "Arte Veneta", n.49, 1996.
- Muraro Michelangelo, L'Olympe de Tiepolo in Gazette de Beaux – Arts",1960.
- Magrini Marina, Il Fontebasso nei Palazzi Veneziani, in "Arte Veneta",1974
- Pedrocco Filippo, Ca' Rezzonico, museo del Settecento veneziano, Venezia : Marsilio, 2001. - 78 p. : ill.; 24 cm.
- Giuseppe Tassini, Curiosità veneziane, ovvero Origini delle denominazioni stradali di Venezia, Rist. – Venezia, Filippi, 1990.
- Judith Martin, No Vulgar Hotel: The Desire and Pursuit of Venice, 2007, ISBN 978-0-393-33060-1
