= Anthony DiPaolo =

American businessman

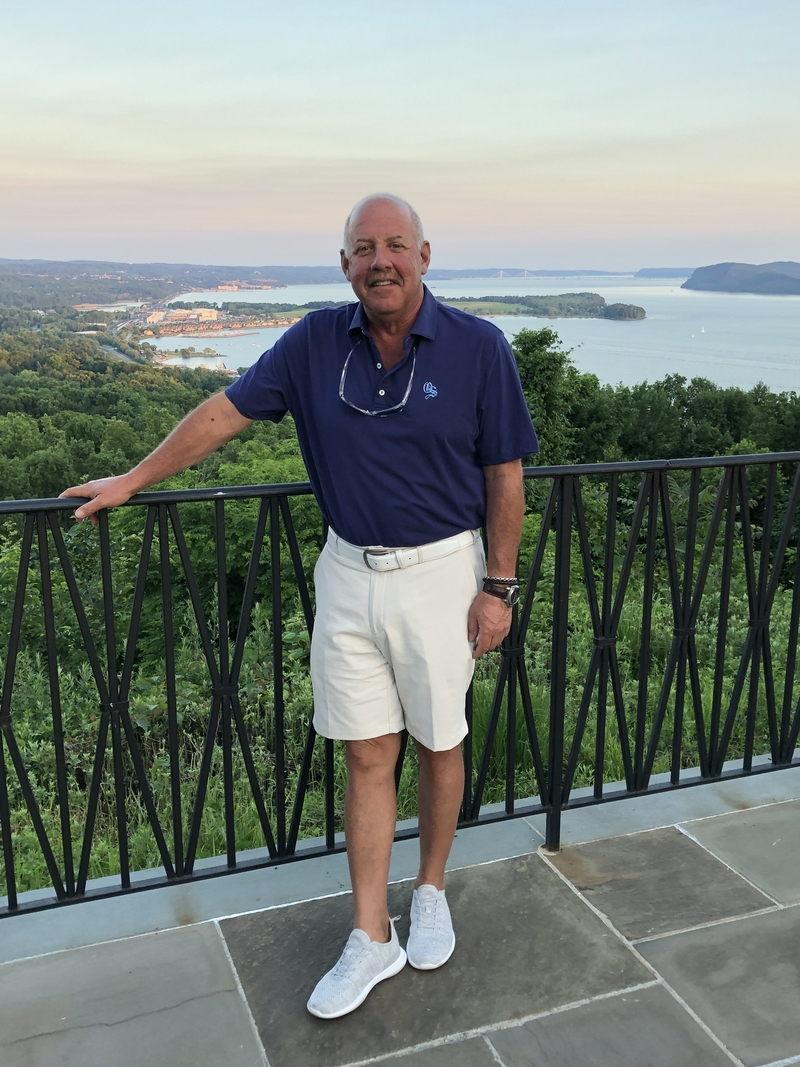
- Anthony DiPaolo
- Born: September 19, 1958 (age 67)
- Other name: Tony DiPaolo
- Education: George Washington University (B.S.)
- Occupations: President and CEO of Work 'N Gear
- Years active: 2002-Present
- Board member of: South Shore Art Center in Cohasset, Massachusetts

Anthony DiPaolo is an American businessman and the president and chief executive officer (CEO) of Work 'N Gear, a workwear and healthcare fashion retailer.

== Career ==
=== Early career ===
DiPaolo's career began at Mitsubishi where he was a footwear sales representative responsible for $20 million in sales and product development. While at Mitsubishi, he traveled throughout Europe, the Far East and Eastern Bloc countries to broker trade agreements between Dow Chemical, the Government of Romania and the other Eastern Bloc countries. DiPaolo later joined Shoe Visions, a United States footwear brand sold in major American retailers such as JCPenney, G.R. Kinney Company and Thom McAn.

=== Herman Survivors ===
In 1990, DiPaolo acquired Herman Survivors from former owners, Stride Rite Corporation, and its sales later rose from $8 million to $50 million. In 2001, he sold Herman Survivors to the American public multinational corporation, Walmart.

=== Work 'N Gear ===
In 2002, DiPaolo purchased Work 'N Gear, which was in bankruptcy, and became the president and CEO where he raised $40 million in investments from venture capitalists. Since then, he formed a new management team and brand focused on the workwear marketplace.

=== Scrubology ===
In 2011, DiPoalo launched Scrubology—a new "store-within-a-store" concept that caters to healthcare consumers. In conjunction with Sears Holdings Corporation, Scrubology was launched in 39 Sears and Kmart locations across the United States.

Sears Holdings Corporation named Scrubology the 2012 "Partner in Transformation" and agreed to launch an additional 52 stores in major metropolitan locations within California, Minnesota, New Jersey, New York, Philadelphia and Washington, DC. Scrubology's flagship website was launched in June 2012 to expand the brand's reach beyond brick-and-mortar locations around the United States.
