= Paola De Luca =

Italian luxury trends forecaster (born 1966)

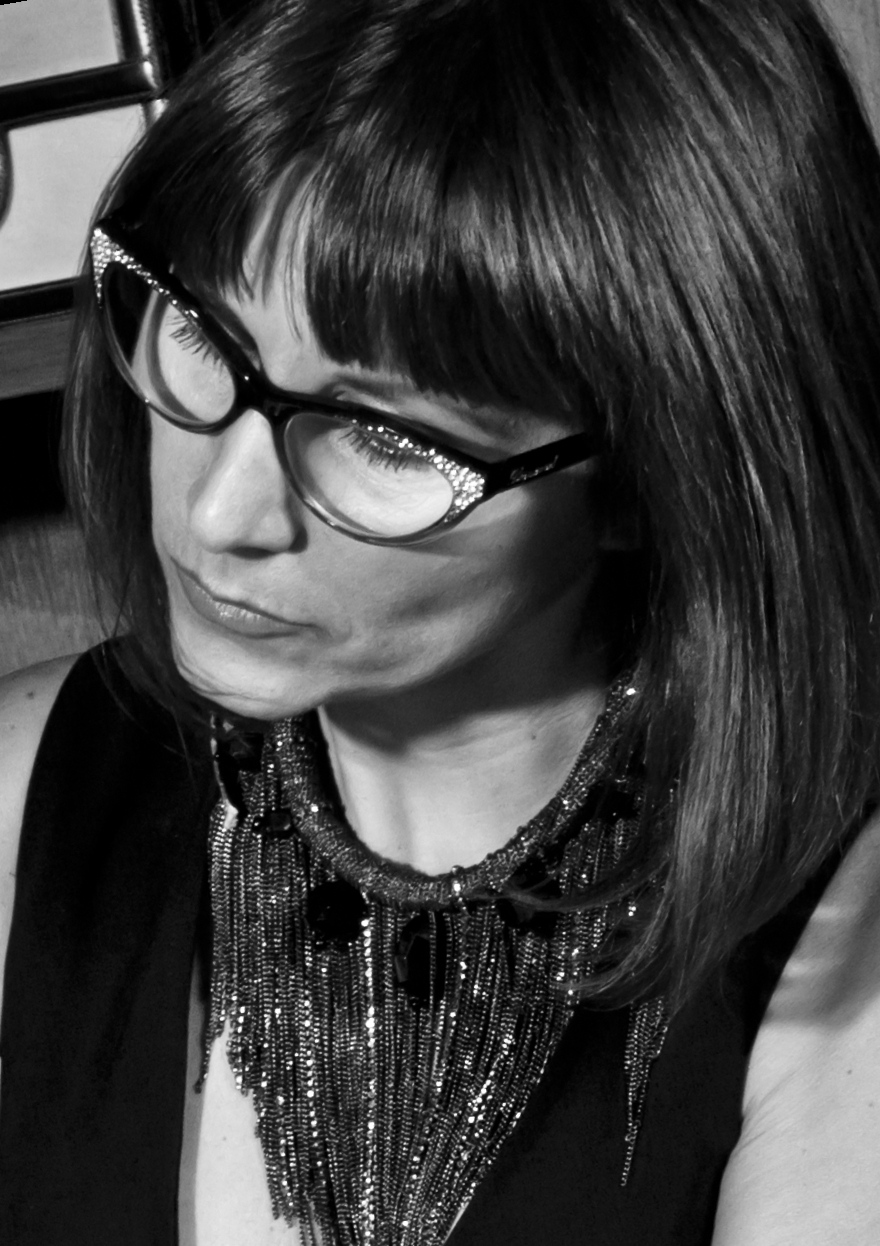
- Paola De Luca, en 2012.
- Born: 18 November 1966 (age 59)
- Occupation: Luxury Trend Forecaster

Paola De Luca (born November 18, 1966) is an Italian luxury trends forecaster most known for developing a trend book on global jewellery design. She also worked as a jewellery designer and has been the Design Director of Rio Tinto Diamonds since 2010.

Tracing her roots as a jewellery designer, De Luca grew up and went to school in Rome. As a teenager, she observed the local culture of Via Condotti after school, getting inspiration from the fashion and accessory trends near Rome’s fashion district adjacent to the Spanish Steps.

In 2002, De Luca established TJF Group Ltd, a research company primarily focused on global jewellery design trends, in partnership with CRU Group of London. For a decade, TJF Group focused on researching jewellery branding and design trends, and published TJF Magazine, which is a print periodical distributed within the international jewellery trade. TJF Group launched the "TJF Trend Book", one of the world's first authoritative publications on jewellery trends and research.

== Biography ==
De Luca founded The Futurist Ltd, a research and creative intelligence company in the global luxury sector. She also pioneered jewellery design trend forecasting reports, which she started as an in-house research while working for UnoAErre.

De Luca studied goldsmithing, metalwork, fashion and art design in Rome before moving to New York City in her early 20s. There, she worked as a fashion and design director for UnoAErre and other brands such as Fendi.

== Career ==
Tracing her roots as a jewellery designer, De Luca grew up and went to school in Rome. As a teenager, she observed the local culture of Via Condotti after school, getting inspiration from the fashion and accessory trends near Rome’s fashion district adjacent to the Spanish Steps.

In 2002, De Luca established TJF Group Ltd, a research company primarily focused on global jewellery design trends, in partnership with CRU Group of London. For a decade, TJF Group focused on researching jewellery branding and design trends, and published TJF Magazine, which is a print periodical distributed within the international jewellery trade. TJF Group launched the "TJF Trend Book", one of the world's first authoritative publications on jewellery trends and research.
