= Andrea Di Paolo =

Italian composer

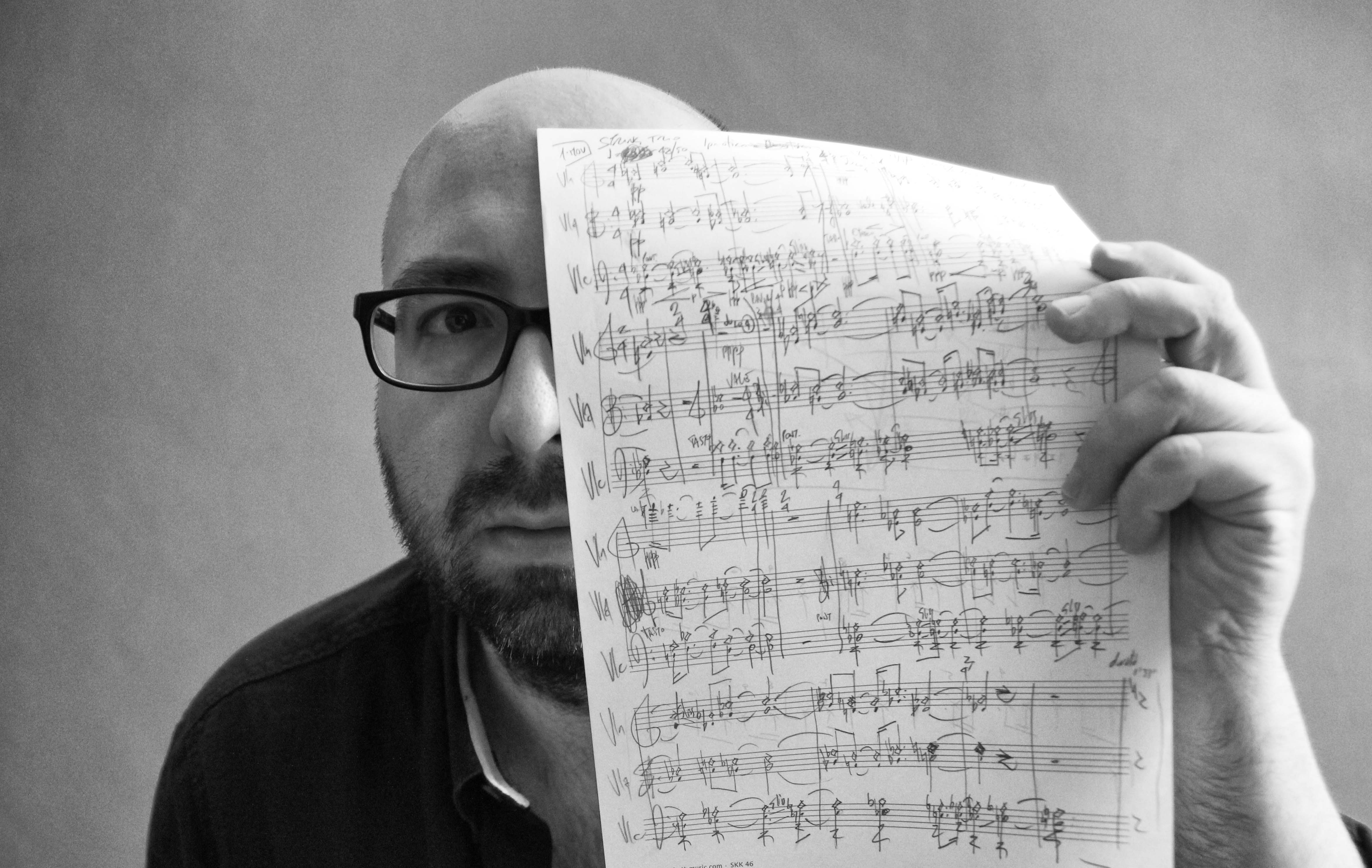
- Born: 24 February 1978 (age 48); Atessa, Italy
- Occupations: Pianist and Composer

Andrea Di Paolo (born in Atessa, Italy, on 24 February 1978) is an Italian pianist and composer of modern classical, contemporary, postminimalism and neoclassical music.

== Biography ==
Andrea Di Paolo began studying music at age 8. He studied piano (Bachelor and Master degree) with Maria Cristina Boccadamo at the "D'Annunzio" Conservatory in Pescara (Abruzzo - Italy) and Composition at the Cité de la Musique et de la Danse, Conservatoire de Strasbourg (Strasbourg, France) with Mark André. In 2010, he got a Diploma of high specialization in Composition at the National Academy of Santa Cecilia (Rome, Italy) with Ivan Fedele; fundamental in his human and artistical development was his meeting with composer Valentyn Sylvestrov in Kyiv (Ukraine).

He attended composition classes of Luciano Berio, Arvo Part, Gyorgy Kurtag, Salvatore Sciarrino, Beat Furrer. His works, for solo instrument, ensemble and orchestra, were performed in Europe, Russia and the USA, broadcast by Radio France and Radio RAI.

In 2008, he won the International Competition for composers “From Romanticism to Contemporary” in Bucharest (Romania), sponsored by the European Commission with his work “L’azur” from a Mallarmé’s text.

Andrea Di Paolo has collaborated with: Lvyv Symphonic Orchestra, Valentin Silvestrov, Ensemble Algoritmo, Ensemble "Accroche Note", Solisti Aquilani, Armand Angster, Mario Caroli, Liliya Gratyla, Luce Zurita, Valeria Kurbatova, Dima Nikolaev, Ensemble Ricochet, Olexandr Kozarenko, Francois Kubler, Marco Rogliano, Lamberg String Quartet, Ivanna Mytrogann, Alexander Zagorinski, Marco Angius, Modular Quartet, Dmytro Tavanets, Clement Fauconnet, Galician Camera Choir, Pauline Haas, Vasil Yazziniak, Igor Shcherbakov, Tonino Guerra, Aram Gharabekian, National Chamber Orchestra of Armenia.

In 2015, his first album Das Universum for String Quartet was published and in 2021, his Piano Solo album titled Planetarium (Preludes for piano, book 1) followed by Musica Humana (Preludes for piano, book 2), released in 2025, published by the record label classicadalvivo

His music is published and distributed by Universal Edition in Wien.

Since 2008 he teaches Composition, Harmony and Analysis in Italian music Conservatories; he is currently teaching Harmony and Analysis at the ''“Luisa D'Annunzio" Conservatory'' in Pescara (Italy).

== Selected works ==
- L'azur - for Soprano and Piano (2007, score on UE WIEN) -
- Five Spaces of Stones - for Ensemble (2009) -
- Noravank - for Ensemble (2009)
- Rudere - for Harp and String quartet (2010, score on UE WIEN) -
- Tundra - for Amplified Ensemble (2010) -
- Arcaica - for Percussion Ensemble (2011, score on UE WIEN) -
- Sonata - for Violoncello solo (2011, score on UE WIEN) -
- Nur - for String Trio (2012, score on UE WIEN) -
- Das Universum - for String quartet (2012, score on UE WIEN) -
- Temple of Hera - for String Orchestra (2012, score on UE WIEN) -
- In Quiete for Morton F. - for Flute and Harp (2014, score on UE WIEN) -
- Planetarium - 10 preludes for Piano (book 1, 2021, score on UE WIEN)
- Musica Humana - 10 preludes for Piano (book 2, 2025, score on UE WIEN)

== Discography ==
- 2015: Das Universum (for string quartet) listen on Spotify
- 2021: Planetarium (for piano) listen on Spotify
- 2025: Musica Humana (for piano) listen on Spotify
