= John R. Hamilton (photographer) =

American photographer

John R. Hamilton (November 12, 1923 – February 7, 1997) was an American photographer. Hamilton began as a magazine photojournalist, then became known for his photographs of actors on film sets. The first movie Hamilton worked on was The Searchers in 1956 with John Ford and John Wayne. He worked on 77 films and his photographs appeared in Life, Look, Time and other newspapers and periodicals.

Hamilton photographed Steve McQueen, Paul Newman, Kirk Douglas, Elizabeth Taylor, Natalie Wood, Clint Eastwood, Elvis and Jayne Mansfield. His portrait of John Wayne was used on the cover of Life in 1965.

In 2003, photographer Bruce Weber's Little Bear Press published a book of Hamilton's celebrity photos titled Thank Your Lucky Stars. Weber says Hamilton's "photographs were intimate and sexy and no one captured our heroes in American cinema like he did. He gave us an insider's view of incredibly private people caught in a special world somewhere between a movie set and home."

== Background ==
Hamilton was born in Philadelphia, Pennsylvania in 1923. He was a sergeant in the Marines during World War II. After the war, he moved to California to attend the Art Center School of Photography.

== Publications ==
- Apache Boy. Grosset & Dunlap, 1968. ASIN B000B78CAC.
- Thunder in the Dust. Abrams, 1987. ISBN 978-1556700064.
- Thank Your Lucky Stars. Little Bear, 2003. ISBN 978-0970574541. With an introduction by Peter Bogdanovich.

== Exhibitions ==
- Thunder in the Dust, Academy of Motion Picture Arts and Sciences, Beverly Hills, CA, 1988;
- International Photography Hall of Fame and Museum, Oklahoma City, OK, 1989.
- Hollywood Exposed, Art Basel, Miami Beach, FL, December 2014.
- Hollywood Cool, Morrison Hotel Gallery, Sunset Marquis Hotel, February 2015.
- John R. Hamilton: Hollywood and the American West, National Cowboy & Western Heritage Museum, February 3, 2017 – May 14, 2017.
