= Paolo Sarti =

Italian painter

Paolo Sarti (born in late 1700s, in Florence) was an Italian painter.

== Biography ==
He mainly painted frescoes, including one in the ceiling (1838) of the Sala degli Esperimenti (Hall of Experiments) in the Collegio di San Giovannino, found adjacent to the Church of San Giovannino degli Scolopi, Florence. The fresco depicts Christian religion reveals science.

Sarti also painted the sipario (theater curtain) of the Teatro della Piazza Vecchia. He depicted Dante legge l'episodio di Francesca da Rimini alla corte di Guido da Polenta (Dante reads the episode of Francesca da Rimini before the Court of Guido II da Polenta). Pietro Baldancoli was a pupil of Sarti.
