= Paolo Panceri =

Italian anatomist and zoologist (1833–1877)

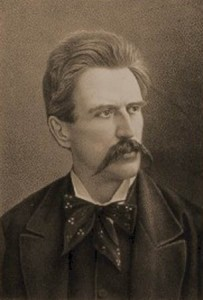
Paolo Panceri photo by da Gasco, published in 1878

Paolo Panceri (1833, in Milan – 1877, in Naples) was an Italian naturalist. Panceri graduated in medicine at the University of Pavia where he began his research. In 1861 he took the Chair of Comparative anatomy at the University of Naples, where he directed the Zoology Museum. Panceri was cautious about the scientific validity of evolutionary theories but was instrumental in the foundation of the Stazione Zoologica Anton Dohrn (Dohrn was a Darwinian). His findings on the bioluminescence of marine invertebrates and studies of Amphioxus led to fame in Italy and abroad. In 1874 he sold his books and scientific papers to Biblioteca Universitaria di Napoli to pay for an expedition to Egypt. They constitute an example of a nineteenth-century library specializing in the natural sciences and comparative anatomy. His students in Naples include Carlo Emery, Leopoldo Maggi and Antonio della Valle. He died aged 44.

== Works ==
- Prelezione al corso di anatomia comparata nella R. Università di Pavia (Milano 1861);
- Note di Anatomia comparata, raccolte dalle lezioni del prof. Paolo Panceri da Antonio Della Valle (Napoli 1875);
- Speranze nell’avvenire delle scienze naturali. Discorso inaugurale (Napoli 1875).
