= Lord Vinheteiro =

Brazilian pianist (born 1980)

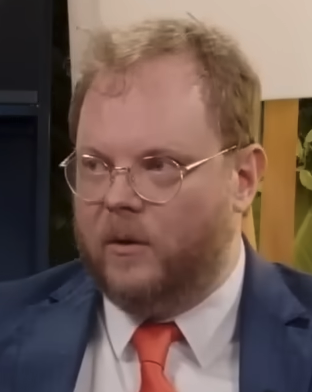
- Vinheteiro in 2026

Background information
- Born: Fabrício André Bernard Di Paolo; January 22, 1980 (age 46); São Paulo, Brazil
- Occupations: Musician, pianist, YouTuber, sound engineer, commentator, aquarist
- Instruments: Piano, accordion, rubber chicken and slide whistle
- Years active: 2008–present

Fabrício André Bernard Di Paolo (born 1980), known professionally as Lord Vinheteiro, is a Brazilian pianist, accordionist, sound engineer, musician, aquarist, and YouTuber. He is best known for playing piano covers on his YouTube channel, where he has over 7 million subscribers and over 1 billion views.

Vinheteiro was a part of the Pânico program produced by Brazilian radio station Jovem Pan FM. He has been known to be critical of brazilian music, especially funk carioca, and for his alignment with right-wing politics.

== Career ==
In 1988, at the age of 8, Vinheteiro started learning music. He took private lessons in piano and violin.

Vinheteiro enrolled in the Arts Institute (IA) of State University of São Paulo. He did not finish the course.

Besides piano and violin, Vinheteiro is a music producer and sound engineer, and he has also taught himself harpsichord, electric bass, guitar, drums, synthesizer, accordion, and, more recently, rubber chickens.

In 2008, Vinheteiro created the YouTube channel Lord Vinheteiro, where he plays piano covers of classic songs from television, cinema, anime, and video games. He participated in Brazilian programs such as Jornal Nacional and The Noite com Danilo Gentili and performed in China with local musicians.

Vinheteiro produces content weekly for his YouTube channel, which has over 7 million subscribers.

== Personal life ==
In 2019, Vinheteiro started dating technology analyst Roberta Klein. In February 2024, they have a son.
