= Paolo Seppani =

Italian footballer

Personal information
- Full name: Paolo Seppani
- Date of birth: 18 August 1986 (age 40)
- Place of birth: Giuliano di Roma, Italy
- Position: Defender

Youth career
- A.S. Roma

Senior career*
Years	Team	Apps	(Gls)
2006–2008	A.S. Roma	0	(0)
2006	→ Frosinone (loan)	0	(0)
2007–2008	→ Val di Sangro (loan)	16	(0)
2016	Città di Anagni	25	(0)
- * Club domestic league appearances and goals

Paolo Seppani (born 18 August 1986 in Giuliano di Roma, Frosinone) is an Italian football (soccer) defender. He currently plays for Città di Anagni Calcio.

He also has played for A.S. Roma, after having played the first half of the 2006/2007 season with Frosinone Calcio.

Seppani played for Pol. Val di Sangro in Serie C2 during the 2007–08 season.
