= Federico Andreotti =

Italian painter

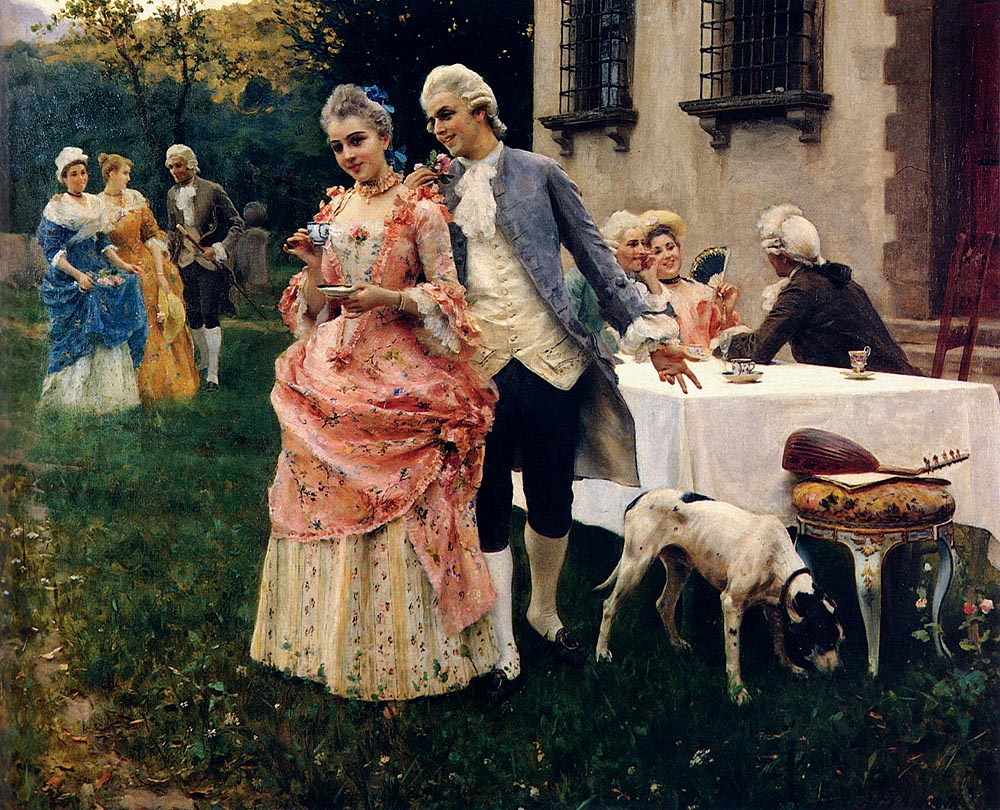
An Afternoon Tea

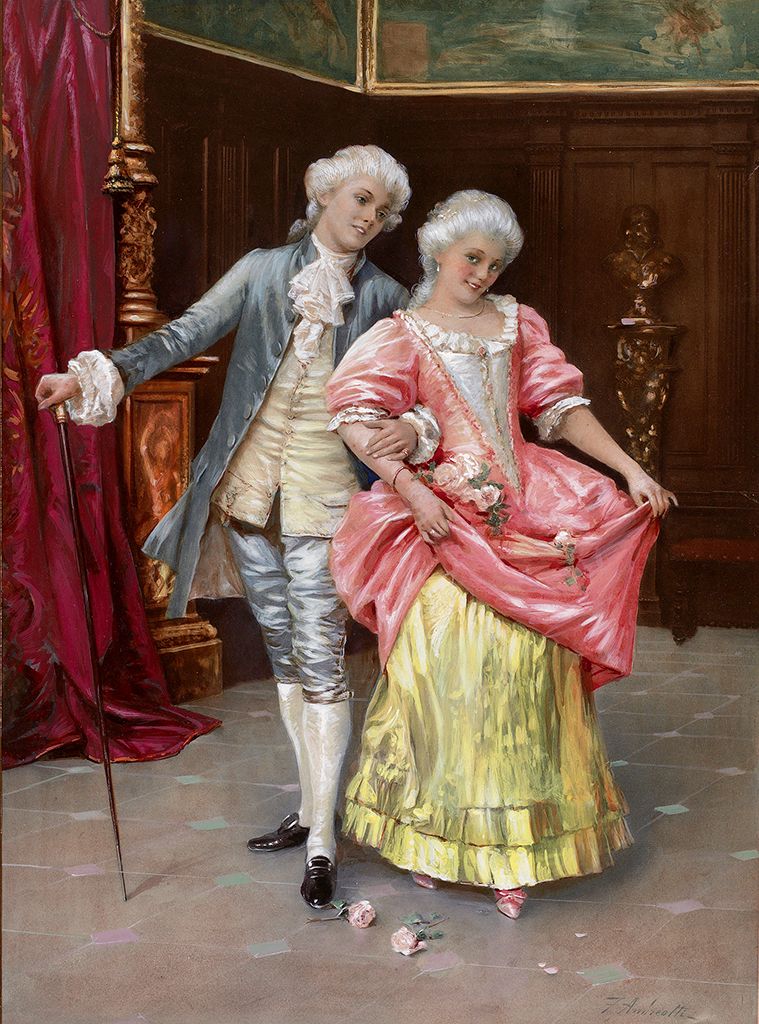
Rococo Pair

Federico Andreotti (6 March 1847 – 1930) was an Italian painter.

== Biography ==
Andreotti was born in Florence. He initially studied with Angiolo Tricca, Stefano Ussi, and at the Florentine Academy of Fine Arts. At a contest, he won a stipend and ultimately gained an appointment as a professor at the Academy. He was prolific as a painter of canvases in Rome, Florence, and other cities. He painted realistic genre and aristocratic scenes, often in dress from the eighteenth centuries. The elaborate period dress and affected airs give his paintings, sometimes described as Rococo Revival, a retardataire focus.

Among his works are:

- I Crapuloni
- The Tavern
- The Reconciliation
- The Music Teacher
- A chi dei due
- Una battuta de'aspetto
- Returning from the Fields
- Half-figure of Old Man
- The Grandfather
- Interrupted Dance
- Countryside Idyll
- The Love Letter

Frescos by Andreotti also decorate the interior of the Teatro Mario Del Monaco in Treviso.
