= Musica a Palazzo =

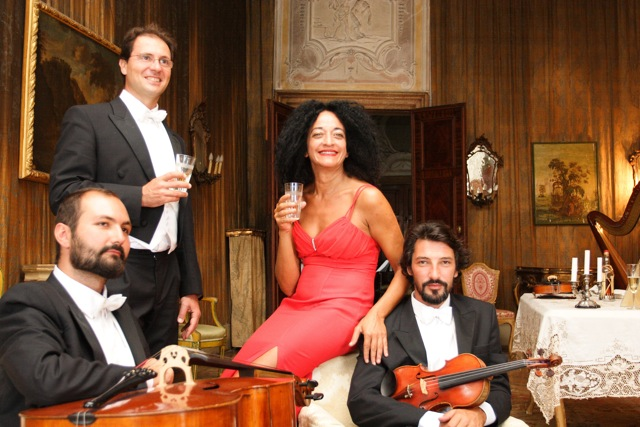
The ensemble of classic musicians that founded Musica a Palazzo

Musica a Palazzo, since 2005, have produced opera performances staged in the Palazzo Barbarigo Minotto, a Venetian Gothic palace facing the Grand Canal. The piano nobile of the palace, with its backdrop of frescoes by Tiepolo and sculptures by Carpoforo Tencalla, is its main performing space. The performing style follows the 19th-century Italian practice of "Salotto Musicale" (Musical Salon). The operas are performed without a stage, with the audience becoming part of the scene.

The program alternates famous operas, such as Verdi's La traviata and Rossini's The Barber of Seville, with Duetti d'amore, a selection of love duets from La bohème, Tosca, Don Giovanni, Rigoletto and other popular operas.

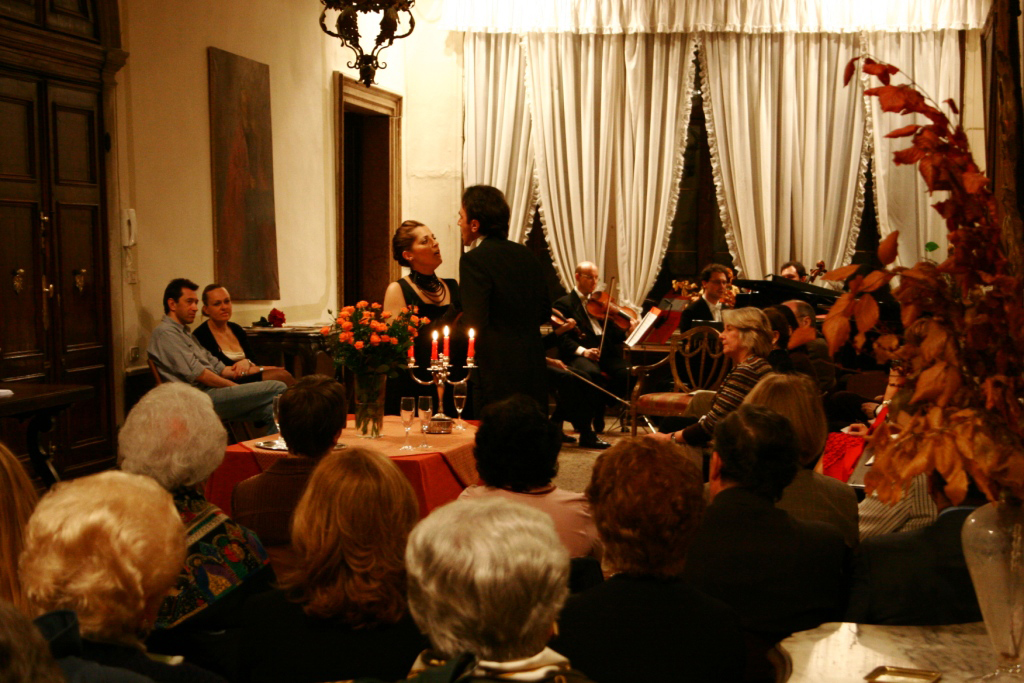
Act 1 of La traviata at Palazzo Barbarigo Minotto. Starring: Antonella Meridda as Violetta

The musicians, a string trio and a piano, have performed in concert halls around the world, including Lincoln Center, Musikverein, La Scala and the Mozarteum. The ensemble staged La traviata at the Royal Pavilion during the 41st Brighton Festival and won the Argus Angel Award for the best production of the festival.

Although some other artists might be hired on particular occasions, the original "Musica a Palazzo Ensemble" is formed by:

- Diego Revilla – violin
- Patrizia Di Paolo – viola
- Patrick Monticoli – cello
- Giovanni Dal Missier – piano

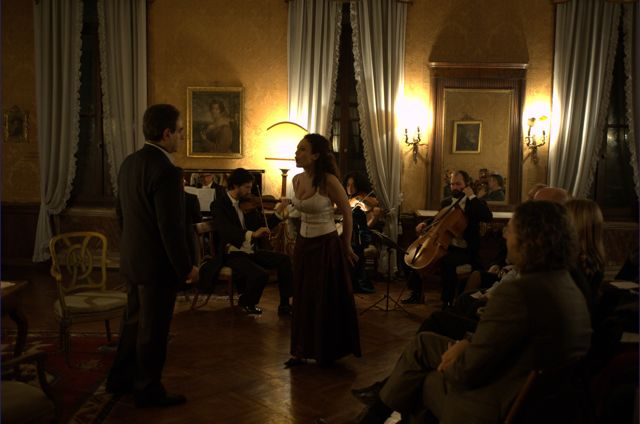
La traviata, act 2, Tiepolo's Room in Palazzo Barbarigo Minotto. Natalia Roman as Violetta, Andrea Zese as Giorgio Germont, Ensemble Musica a Palazzo

== Reviews ==
Press

- The Daily Telegraph – "We are captivated by the quality of the music, the splendour of the setting (Tiepolo frescoes), the power and passion of the singing..."
- The Times – "Grand opera reconceived as tea-room tinkle..."
- Il Gazzettino – "Wonderful stuccos tinted by time and frescos are the perfect frame for a dive into the past, on the notes of romantic and ravishing musics."
- Weltexpress – "Four musicians succeed in what usually takes a whole orchestra ... this is a whole new experience, to experience great voices and strong emotions so closely."
- The Argus – "This Opera of love and loss is totally stunning, fully engaging and sometimes raises the hairs on the back of your neck."

Guide books

- Lonely Planet – "Venice"
- Bootsnall – "Venice"
- Chiavi d’oro delle tre venezie – "Un ospite a Venezia"
- Marco Polo – "Venedig"
- La guide de Routard – "Venice"
- Time Out – "Venice, Verona, Treviso & the Veneto"
- Condé Nast – "Traveller"
- Meridiani – "Laguna veneta"
