= Paolo Ortiz =

Paraguayan footballer (born 1985)

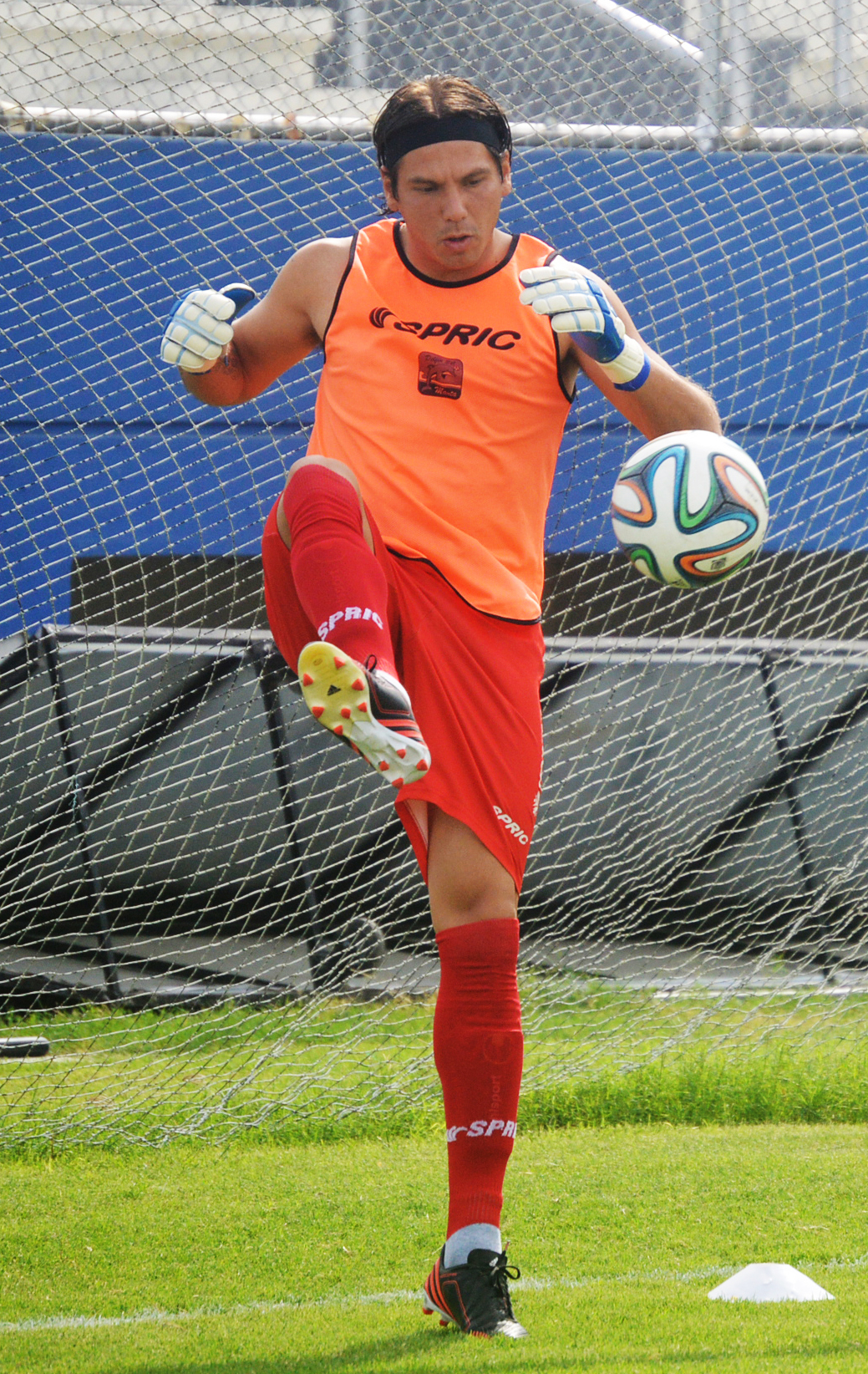

Personal information
- Full name: Paolo Roberto Ortiz
- Date of birth: 14 January 1985 (age 41)
- Place of birth: Asunción, Paraguay
- Height: 1.85 m (6 ft 1 in)
- Position: Goalkeeper

Team information
- Current team: General Caballero

Senior career*
Years	Team	Apps	(Gls)
2006–2010	Cerro Porteño	1	(0)
2008	→ 3 de Febrero (loan)	16	(0)
2008	→ Real Arroyo Seco (loan)	19	(0)
2011–	General Caballero	1	(0)
- * Club domestic league appearances and goals

Paolo Roberto Ortíz (born 14 January 1985) is a Paraguayan football goalkeeper who currently plays for General Caballero.

== See also ==
- Football in Paraguay
- List of football clubs in Paraguay
