= Paolo (surname) =

Paolo may be a surname. Notable people with the surname include:

- Connor Paolo (born 1990), American actor
- Juddha Paolo, Filipino actor
- Gianni Paolo (born 1996), Italian-American actor, writer and director
