= Paolo Di Paolo =

Italian photographer (1925–2023)

Paolo Di Paolo (17 May 1925 – 12 June 2023) was an Italian photographer.

Di Paolo was born into a poor family in the town of Larino, Molise, Italy, the son of Michele Di Paolo, who ran a small shop selling tobacco and salt, and Michelina (née Lallo), a smallholder, painter and embroiderer. He died in Termoli on 12 June 2023, at the age of 98.
