= Claude Philippe =

British-born French-American restaurateur

Philippe in 1970

Claudius Charles Philippe, also known as Philippe of the Waldorf or The Host of the Waldorf, (10 December 1910—24 December 1978) was a British-born French-American restaurateur, catering director, hotelier and businessman, who was the hotel banquet manager of the prestigious Waldorf Astoria New York hotel in the 1940s and 1950s. From 1961 until 1963 he worked as executive vice president of Loews Hotels, and was responsible for the planning and building of six new New York hotels.

Philippe is best remembered for founding the April in Paris Ball at the Waldorf Astoria in 1951, which he ran with Elsa Maxwell until his sacking from the hotel in 1959. The balls were major events in the US socialite calendar, and raised millions of dollars for American and French charities over the 28 years of its existence. His Lucullus Circle dinners also attracted some of the wealthiest businessmen of the day to feast on six to eight course meals. During his career at the Waldorf Astoria it has been estimated that Philippe was responsible for his clients spending $150 million alone on banquets, which led him to be referred to as "one of the truly great men this industry has ever produced" by George Lang.

The suave Philippe led a colorful life, with many lovers including Grace Kelly and Barbara Walters, and three wives. He was investigated for tax evasion in 1958 and admitted guilt one count, for which he was fined the maximum $10,000. He had numerous other business interests and investments, and was responsible for building at least three restaurants, a casino, a theater, and an eighteen-hole golf course in Guadeloupe in the 1960s.

== Career ==
=== Background ===
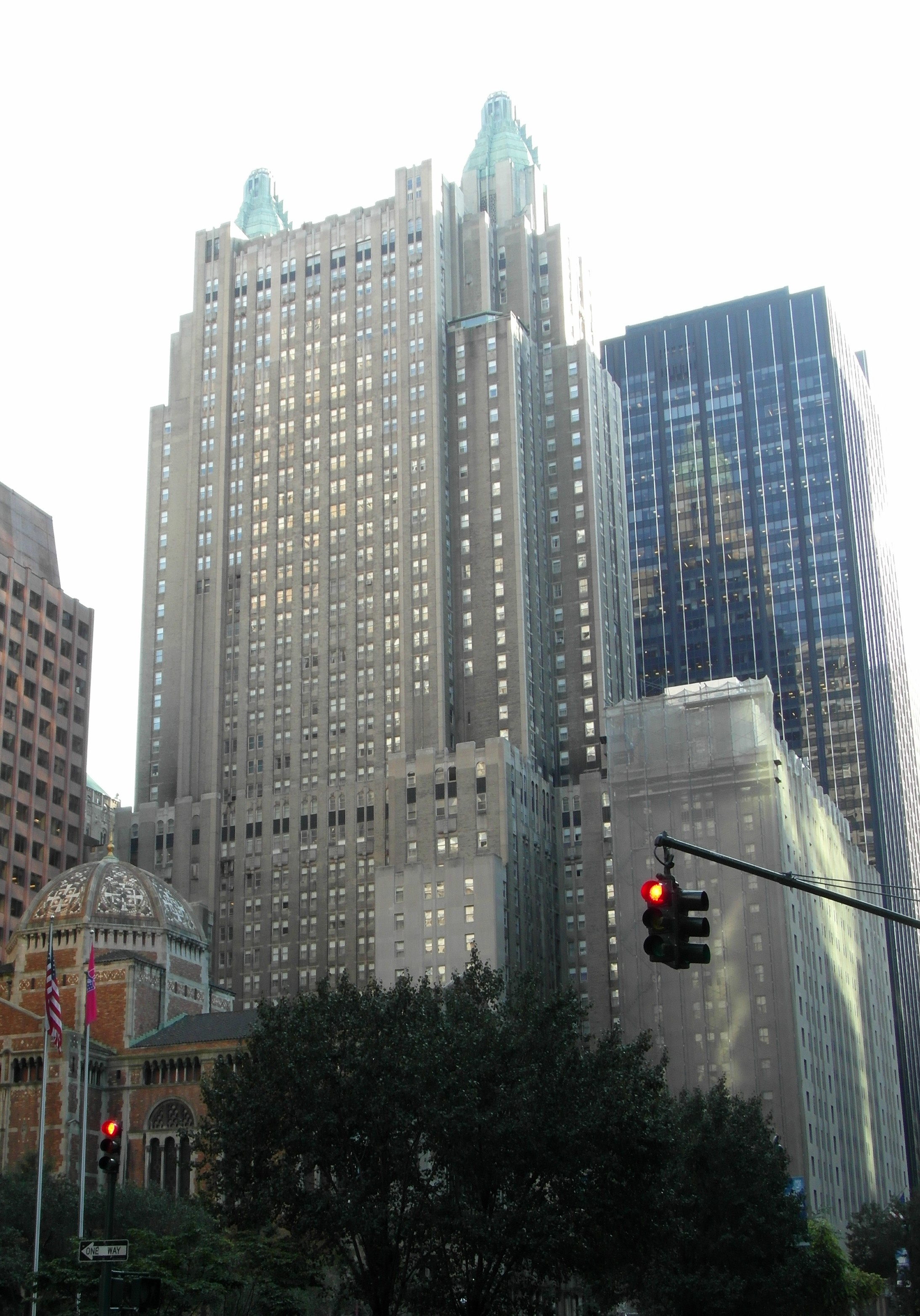
The Waldorf Astoria New York Hotel

Philippe was born in London in 1910, the son of a chef, and was trained at the Hôtel de Crillon in Paris. By age 20, he had settled in the United States and was an assistant to the Waldorf's Oscar Tschirky. Upon Oscar's retirement in 1943, Philippe stepped into this position as Maître d'hôtel. He went on to become "one of New York's cuisine kingpins". In July 1948, Philippe hired Alexis Lichine to buy wines in Europe for the Waldorf Astoria; the two men would become close friends and business partners.

=== Social events ===
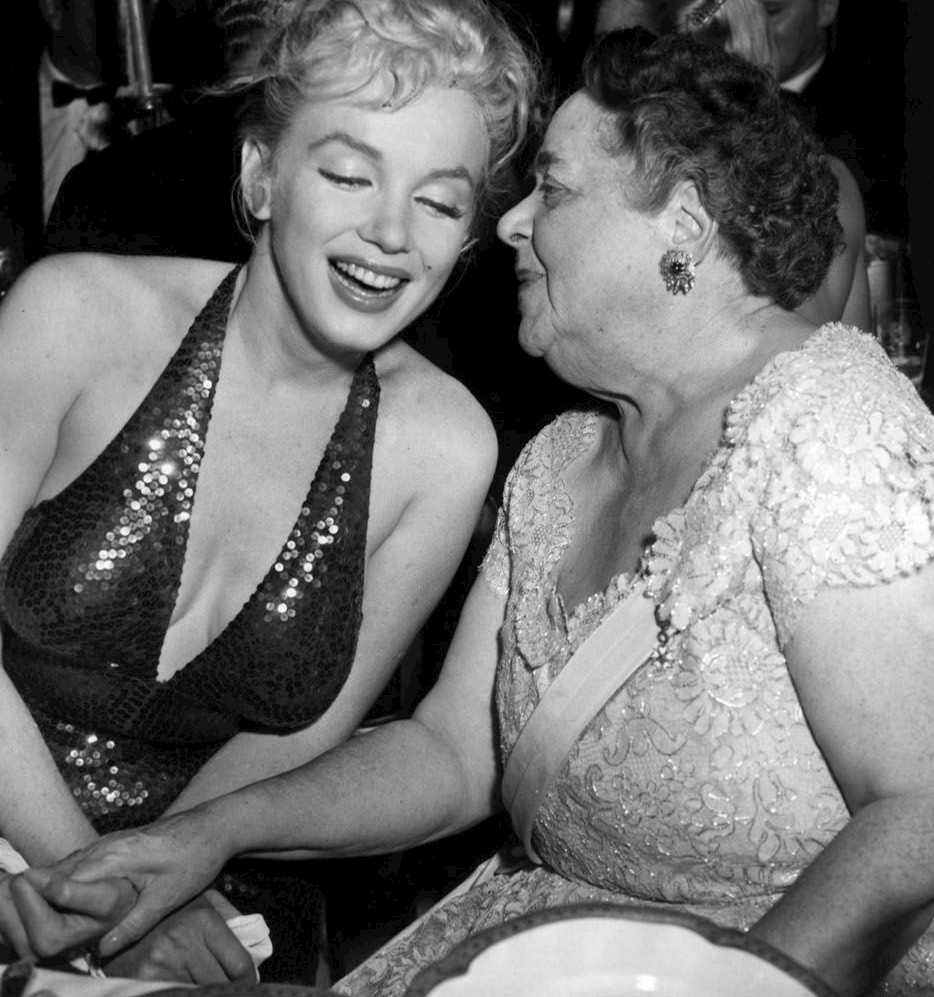
Marilyn Monroe with organizer Elsa Maxwell at the 1957 April in Paris Ball

In 1951 Philippe founded the April in Paris Ball at the Waldorf. It was initially held annually in April 1952, but according to Ann Vaccaro, former executive director of the ball, it was changed to October because "Mr. Philippe decided that because there are so many balls in the spring he would make it in October". After being changed to October, it often marked the start of the US fall social season; the balls were major events in the socialite calendar, and raised millions of dollars for American and French charities over the 28 years of its existence. It was staged in the Grand Ballroom at the Waldorf for eight years before moving to the Hotel Astor in 1960, the Seventh Regiment Armory in 1961, and other venues. The ball was designed to cater for "very, very high-class people" according to Vaccaro. Raffle tickets cost US$100 per person and offered opulent prizes such as a US$5000 bracelet and other jewels, expensive furs, perfumes and even cars. It attracted many of the most famous people of the day, including Marilyn Monroe and Marlene Dietrich. By the mid 1970s his balls were charging $185 per person; the 1974 ball netted roughly $175,000. During his career at the Waldorf Astoria it has been estimated that Philippe was responsible for his clients spending $150 million alone on banquets.

Philippe was also noted for his Lucullus Circle dinners and women-only luncheons, which were both very popular. The Lucullus Circle dinners, inaugurated in 1951, brought about a "new golden age of gastronomy", attracting some of the wealthiest businessmen in the world at the time to feast on some "six to eight food courses and two wines with each course". Philippe "enjoyed acting like a cross between a benevolent dictator and a kindly father" at the dinners according to George Lang. The ninth dinner featured a menu of "heroic proportions", 17 inches (430 mm) high and 12 inches (300 mm) wide, with over eight pages. On 10 May 1965, Claude Philippe threw a party for Chevalier off his usual site, this time in the Oscar's Delmonico wine caves. By 1972, however the dinners had begun to lose their appeal. New York Magazine noted that the dinners were still appreciated for their "enormous stocks of wine" but that it no longer seemed to "have the appeal of the other groups". They nonetheless continued. After Philippe's death, his wife, Helga, took over planning the gentlemen's dinners, as well as coordinating the wines and greeting the attendees; she was the only woman present at these events.

=== Later work and interests ===
After being sacked from the Waldorf Astoria in 1959, Philippe was appointed executive vice president of the Zeckendorf Hotels Corporation for two years, which at the time owned the Commodore, the Manhattan and Drake hotels. From 1961 until 1963 he worked as executive vice president of Loews Hotels, and was responsible for the planning and building of six new New York hotels, including the Summit Hotel. After 1963 he presided his own consulting firm, taking responsibility of the April Paris Ball until his death in 1978. Philippe was the head of a group of investors who bought the noted Le Pavillon in 1967. The restaurant came on the market after the sudden death of its previous owner, Henri Soulé, in 1966. However, Philippe and his investment group did not own the restaurant very long; it was forced to close in October 1972 due to a lack of patronage. He was taken gravely ill three days before the 1978 ball in October and died by Christmas of that year.

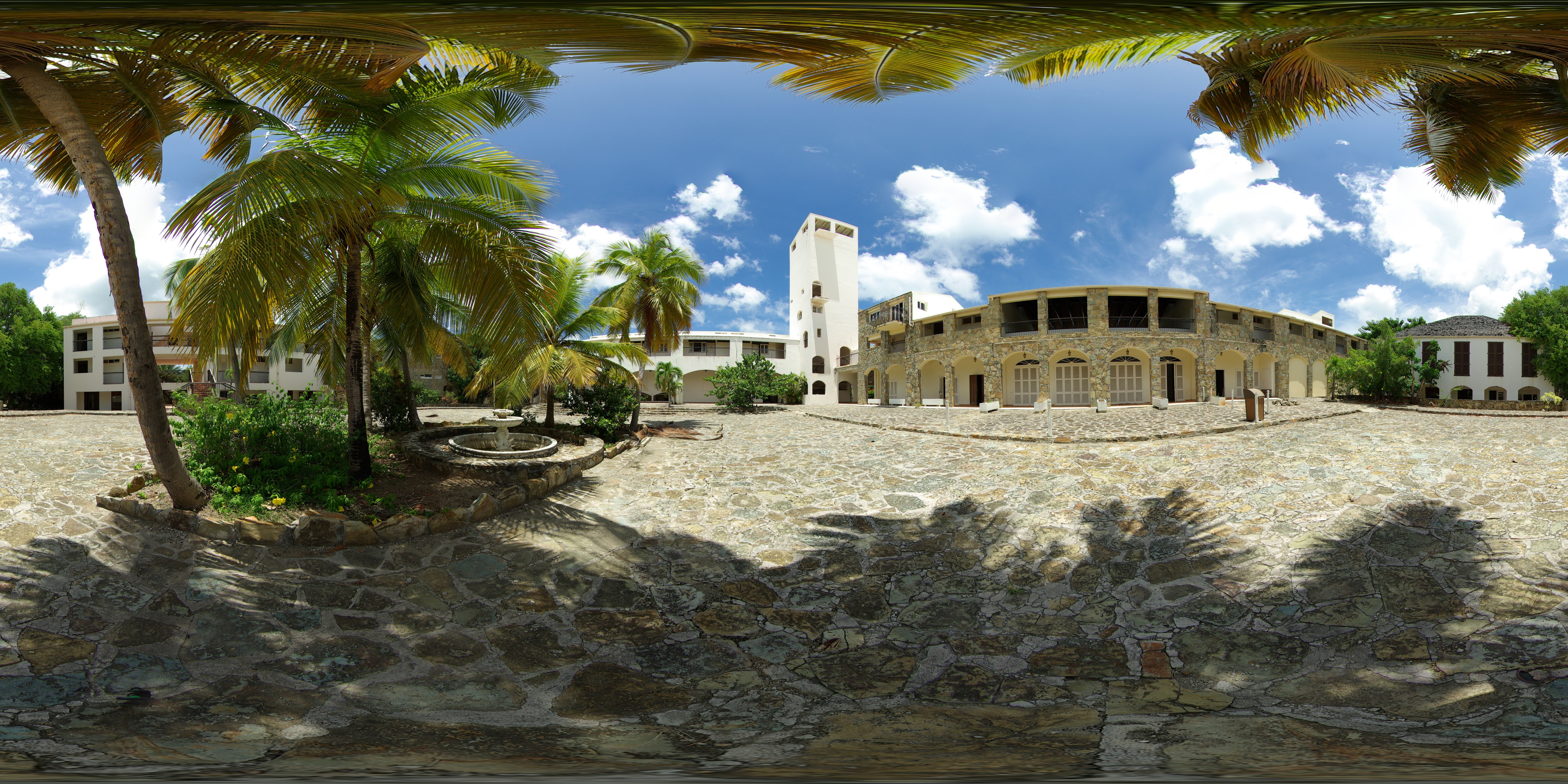
The La Belle Creole resort in 2007

Philippe had numerous business interests and investments, and was responsible for building at least three restaurants, a casino, a theater, and an eighteen-hole golf course in Guadeloupe in the 1960s. By 1960, Alexis Lichine and Philippe owned an extensive stretch of beach called Jacks Bay near the East End of Saint Croix in the United States Virgin Islands. They bought a large parcel of undeveloped land in the French portion of Saint Martin around 1964, Philippe's dream had been to build a luxury resort called La Belle Creole which would be like a tiny portion of France in the Caribbean. Philippe's intended guests were the people he had been acquainted with through his hotel work. His plans were also for a casino, a nightclub and various luxury shops as part of the resort. The French government was interested enough in the project to assist Philippe by providing a desalination plant and a paved road leading to the potential resort. Philippe hired architects and designers who estimated that it would cost about $5.5 million to make the dream a reality. It was decided to break ground after an investment of $2.5 million, which was enough to construct buildings and begin the resort plans. However, Philippe's funds ran out by 1969 and work on La Belle Creole was suspended.

Philippe was able to get an emergency loan of $250,000 from a Lebanese company, but this did not go very far to completing the work on the project. He got some help in redrawing his budget and a larger loan of $500,000 from a large Paris bank through J. Jay Frankel, a financier on Wall Street. Philippe's investors believed that the re-budgeting and additional loan would complete at least half of the resort and allow it to open for business, but Philippe continued to make expensive changes in the project such as adding more windows to all of the suites. When it was evident that the project was once again in financial trouble, one of the investors in the property offered Philippe a loan for an additional $750,000, provided that the project would now result in a more modest resort. Philippe was highly insulted and told the investor offering the additional funding, "I have created a Cadillac. You want to put into it a Chevrolet engine."

By the summer of 1970, funds to continue building were exhausted; work stopped on La Belle Creole and Philippe was forced to abandon his project. The resort eventually went into the receivership of the French government, who eagerly sought a buyer. Potential new investors were interested in the property, Club Med and Marriott among them, but lost their interest upon learning of the financial tangle. Aristotle Onassis also thought about La Belle Creole, but changed his mind after his representative had inspected the property. The resort began to slip into deterioration and theft was very common-resort furniture could be easily found in many local homes. Two men set up shop at the resort with the claim that they were liquidating the property's assets for its creditors, but they had no connection to the investors or the resort. Philippe refused to admit failure with La Belle Creole and until his death in 1978, continued to tell friends that his glorious resort would open soon. It was not until 1989 that the resort was completed and opened for guests for the first time. The casino and nightclub never materialized and the size of the property was reduced to 25 acres. In 1995, Hurricane Luis forced the closing of La Belle Creole and the resort has remained closed since that time. (Note: A US investor purchased the property in 2004, but was told at the time that studies indicated the construction of a hotel was not feasible. He then explored the idea of turning the property into residencies in 2009; obtaining clear titles for the lots became an issue. In 2013, it was reported that the investor decided to return to the original plan of constructing a five-star hotel on the property, which would mean clearing all existing buildings for a new structure. The developer indicated to the French government that if he did not receive the necessary permits in a timely manner, he would withdraw his support for the project.)

== Personal life and reception ==
Philippe was described as being tall, dark and lanky of frame, with an aquiline nose, long bony fingers and an acid tongue. He was cited as being of a "suave" and "polished" demeanor, and Life magazine remarked that he was "suave enough to charm the most difficult hostess". He was a "strange, extremely creative, intelligent, but a somewhat warped individual"; yet one, according to George Lang, who was "an amazingly generous person" who would frequently invite guests to his country estate at Watch Hill Farm. Victor Borge referred to Philippe as a "one-man atom".

A workaholic, and a sometimes controversial figure, in 1958 he was indicted on four counts of tax evasion, with the Federal prosecutor believing him to have collected $300,000 in gratuities in 1952-55 alone. He pleaded guilty to one count of the indictment, and was fined a maximum $10,000.

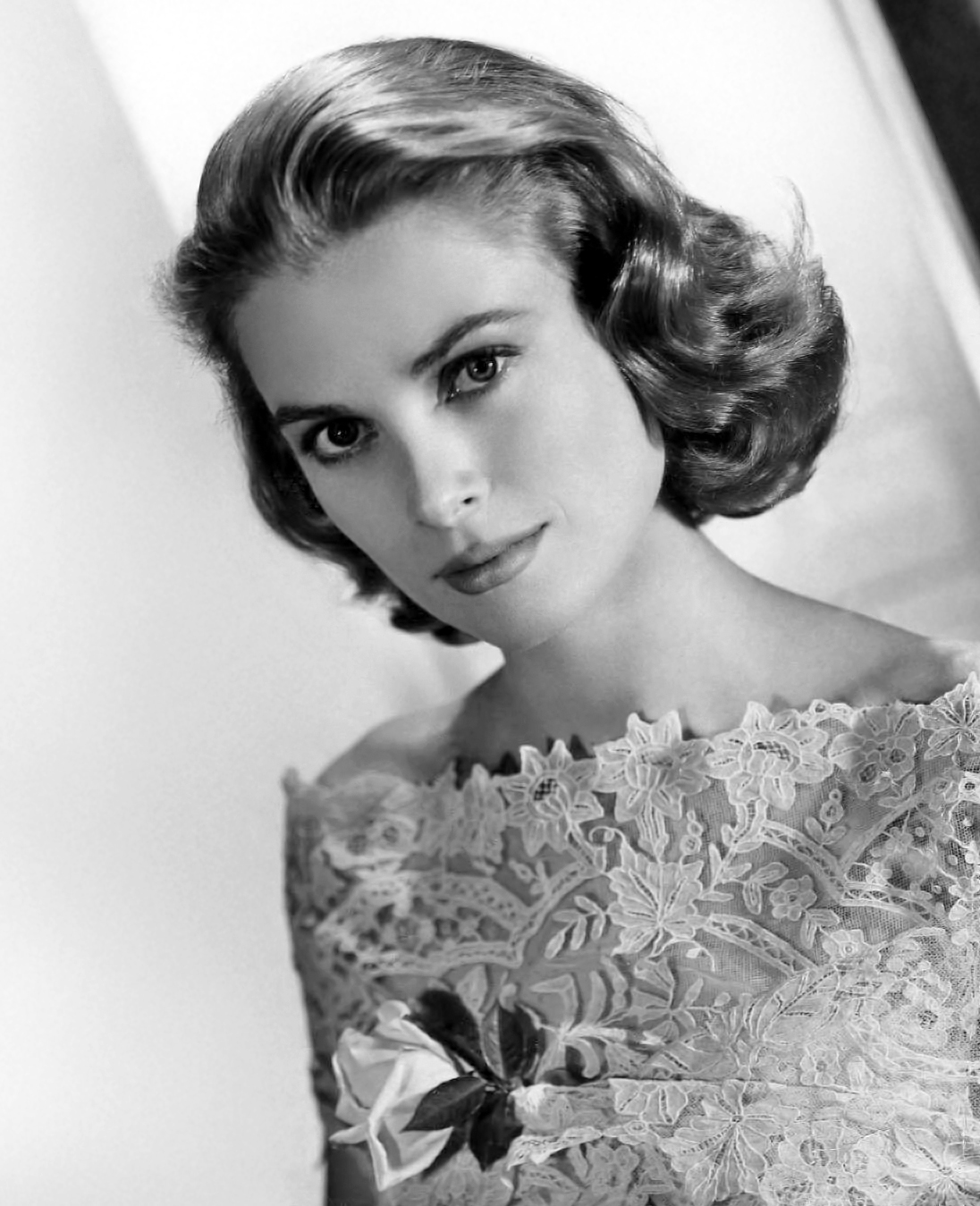
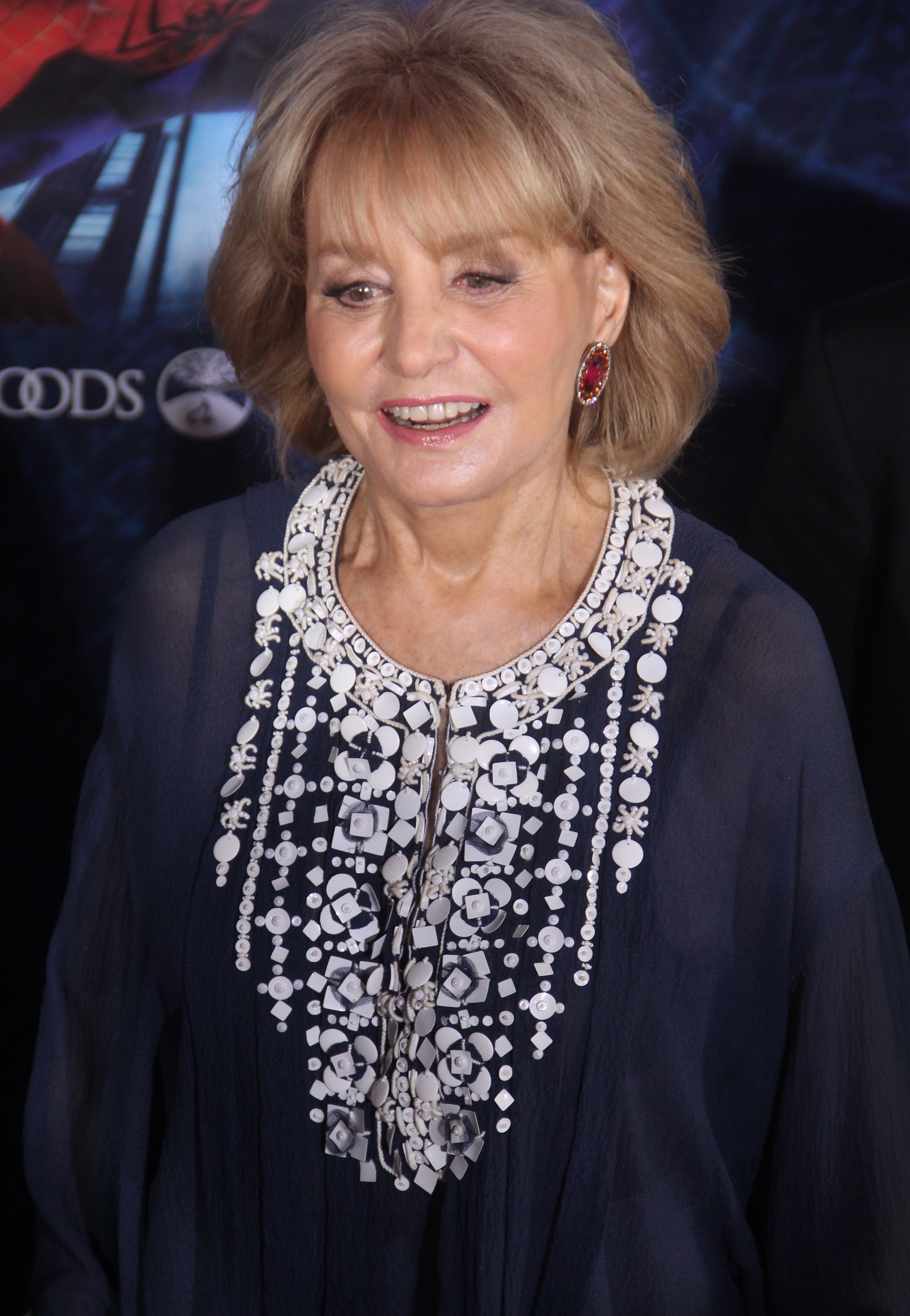
Grace Kelly and Barbara Walters

Philippe was a womanizer and was extremely popular with women; when visiting the hotel, "nearly every society lady in New York of the 1950s insisted that she either knew or was served personally by the great Claudius Charles Philippe". He was married three times, first to food writer Poppy Cannon from 1941 to 1949, with whom he had a daughter, Claudia; Cannon went on to marry Walter White. His second wife from 1952 to about 1961 was Comédie-Française actress Mony Dalmès, who incidentally doubled for Marilyn Monroe in a number of films, and his third and last wife was Helga in the 1970s. He was romantically involved with numerous women, including Grace Kelly before her marriage and Barbara Walters. In 1977, Philippe was said to be writing his memoirs; it is not known if he intended them to be published.

George Lang of the Waldorf believed that the hotel tried to cover up his misdemeanors, noting that he had a "kind of arrogance, an unnecessary arrogance very often, which was counterproductive". However, he referred to Philippe as "one of the truly great men this industry has ever produced". Alphonse Salamone similarly remarked that "Claude Philippe brought an ingredient to this industry that I don't think has been surpassed". Jorge Hansen of Hilton Hotels stated that Philippe was "probably the outstanding creative sales catering director of any hotel. He knew also when sat on the client side how to get the very best for the client".

== Bibliography ==
- Avery, Jeanne (1 December 2004). Astrological Aspects. American Federation of Astr. ISBN 978-0-86690-553-4.
- Hannau, Hans W. (1967). Guadeloupe. W. Andermann; Garden City, N. Y., Doubleday.
- Jacobson, Julius H. (2008). The Classical Music Experience. Sourcebooks, Inc. ISBN 978-1-4022-4809-2.
- Lang, George (December 2005). Nobody Knows the Truffles I've Seen. iUniverse. ISBN 978-0-595-37743-5.
- Morehouse III, Ward (1991). The Waldorf Astoria: America's Gilded Dream. Xlibris Corp. ISBN 978-1413465044.
- Ullman, James Ramsey; Dinhofer, Alfred D. (1968). Caribbean here & now: the complete vacation guide to 52 sunny islands and vacation lands in the Caribbean Sea. Macmillan.
