= April in Paris =

April in Paris may refer to:

- "April in Paris" (song), a 1932 popular standard written by Vernon Duke and E. Y. Harburg
- April in Paris (film), a 1952 musical starring Doris Day and Ray Bolger
- April in Paris (album), a 1957 album by the Count Basie Orchestra
- "April in Paris," a 1962 short story by Ursula K. Le Guin, first anthologized in The Wind's Twelve Quarters
- April in Paris, a 1992 play by John Godber
- April in Paris Ball, an annual US gala event
