= Esther B. Aresty =

Esther B. Aresty (March 26, 1908 — December 23, 2000) was a cookbook collector and culinary historian who wrote on cooking, cookbooks, cuisine, and etiquette.

== Early life and education ==
Esther Bradford was born March 26, 1908, in Syracuse, New York, to Lithuanian immigrants. Her family later moved to Chariton, Iowa. Her mother was a talented pianist and cook.

== Marriage, collecting and publishing ==
Esther met Jules Aresty while working for Mandel Brothers Department Store in Chicago. In 1941, he became a co-owner of the S.P. Dunham and Co. department store in Trenton, New Jersey.

After their marriage they settled in Trenton, New Jersey. They had two children. Aresty began to collect rare books during the couple's frequent travels to Europe. Her collection eventually included 576 books and 13 manuscripts from five centuries and cultures all over the world. Small but carefully chosen, it has been called "one of the country's most valuable troves of cookbook treasures".

Her own publications include The Delectable Past (1964), The Best Behavior (1970), and The Exquisite Table (1980). The Delectable Past is an extensive culinary history, which she described as covering "the joys of the table - from Rome to the Renaissance, from Queen Elizabeth I to Mrs. Beeton." In addition to recreating more than 700 recipes of the past, the book discusses menus and manners, placing them in their historical context. In The Best Behavior, she again drew upon her collection, discussing the development of manners as shown through courtesy and etiquette books. The Exquisite Table focused on the history of French cooking. Aresty is credited with foreshadowing current academic work on women and the kitchen, introducing the "liberating idea that food was a suitable, if indeed not essential, subject of discourse".

She wrote both non-fiction and fiction. Her first published book was an adult romance, The Grand Venture (1963). She later published a teen romance novel, Romance in Store (1983) under the pseudonym Elaine Arthur. Aresty also worked as a writer and producer on Elsa Maxwell's radio show, Elsa Maxwell's Party Line.

She held a position on the board of advisors of the American Institute of Wine and Food.

== Esther B. Aresty Collection of Rare Books on the Culinary Arts ==
Aresty and her husband donated the Esther B. Aresty Collection of Rare Books on the Culinary Arts to the University of Pennsylvania in 1996. The collection includes, among others, the first cookbook ever printed, De Honesta Voluptate by Bartholomew de Platina, produced in Venice in 1475; a 15th-century Roman manuscript written by admirers of the Roman gourmet Apicius and an encomium in rhyme, written by Frederick the Great of Prussia in praise of his cook in 1772.
