= Paulette =

Paulette may refer to:

- Paulette (given name), a French feminine given name
- DJ Paulette (born 1966), English house music DJ
- Paulette (tax), a French tax instituted in 1604
- Paulette Caveat, a 1973 legal caveat filed by a group of Dene chiefs against the government of Canada
- Paulette (comics), a 1971–1984 comic by Georges Wolinski
- Paulette (film), a 2012 French film.
