= Leonidas C. Dyer =

American politician (1871–1957)

Member of the U.S. House of Representatives from Missouri's 12th district
- In office March 4, 1915 – March 3, 1933
- Preceded by: Michael J. Gill
- Succeeded by: James R. Claiborne
- In office March 4, 1911 – June 18, 1914
- Preceded by: Harry M. Coudrey
- Succeeded by: Michael J. Gill

Personal details
- Born: June 11, 1871 near Warrenton, Missouri, U.S.
- Died: December 15, 1957 (aged 86) St. Louis, Missouri, U.S.
- Party: Republican
- Spouse: Clara Hyer
- Children: Martha Dyer Collins, Catherine Verwoert
- Education: Central Wesleyan College; Washington University in St. Louis
- Occupation: Politician, attorney

Leonidas Carstarphen Dyer (June 11, 1871 – December 15, 1957) was an American politician, attorney, civil rights activist, and military officer. A Republican, he served eleven terms as a U.S. representative from Missouri from 1911 to 1933. In 1898, enlisting in the U.S. Army as a private, Dyer served notably in the Spanish–American War; and was promoted to colonel at the war's end.

Working as an attorney in St. Louis, Dyer started an anti-usury campaign and was elected to Congress as a Republican in 1910. As a progressive reformer, Dyer authored an anti-usury law in 1914 that limited excessive loan rates by bank lenders in the nation's capital, then still governed by Congress.

Horrified by the East St. Louis riots in 1917 and the high rate of reported lynchings in the South, Dyer introduced the Dyer Anti-Lynching Bill in 1918. In 1920, the Republican Party supported such legislation in its platform from the National Convention. In January 1922, Dyer's bill was passed by the House, which approved it by a wide margin due to "insistent countrywide demand". The bill was defeated by filibusters by white conservative, Southern Democrats in the U.S. Senate in December 1922, in 1923, and 1924.

In 1919, Dyer authored the motor-vehicle theft law, which made transporting stolen automobiles across state lines a federal crime. By 1956, the FBI reported that the law had enabled the recovery of cars worth more than $212 million. In terms of Prohibition, Dyer voted against various anti-liquor laws, including the Eighteenth Amendment to the U.S. Constitution. Dyer served in Congress from the 62nd Congress to the 72nd Congress. He was defeated for re-election in 1932.

== Early life and education ==
Dyer was born near Warrenton in Warren County, Missouri, the son of James Coleman Dyer and Martha E. (Camp) Dyer. His father's family had roots in Virginia, where his uncle David Patterson Dyer was born; he was elected as a Republican Congressman from Missouri (1869–71).

Leonidas attended common schools and Central Wesleyan College. He studied law at Washington University in St. Louis, received his LL.B. degree in 1893, and was admitted to the bar.

== Service in Spanish–American War ==
When the Spanish–American War began, Dyer joined the United States Army and served in combat during the Santiago campaign as a private in 1898. He was promoted to colonel during the war, and served as a member of the staff of Herbert S. Hadley, future Governor of Missouri.

== St. Louis attorney and reformer ==
After the war, Dyer served as assistant circuit attorney in St. Louis, where he championed an anti-usury reform campaign that eventually gained national attention. Dyer successfully represented a railroad clerk who was being charged 34% monthly (408% annual) interest on a $100 loan after having paid $480 interest in 14 months. None of the interest payment to the money lender was used to pay off the principal. The money lender, in front of Att. Dyer, tore up the railroad worker's loan. Dyer organized a group of wealthy merchants in St. Louis who through investigations were able to keep interest rates low in Missouri.

== Congressional career ==
Leonidas C. Dyer from Missouri was elected to Congress in 1910. In 1918 he authored the Dyer anti-lynching bill. Although passed in the House in 1922, the bill was defeated in the Senate by a Southern Democratic filibuster. Dyer's motto: "We have just begun to fight."

In 1910, Dyer successfully ran and was elected Congressman to the U.S. House of Representatives. He was repeatedly re-elected, though his time in Congress was briefly interrupted between 1914 and 1915 due to a dispute over 1912 election results, but was reelected in 1914.

Dyer was defeated for re-election from his district in 1932, 1934 and 1936, and decided to retire from politics. Dyer represented the 12th District of Missouri, which had a majority African-American population. They were disappointed by the Republican failure to pass an anti-lynching bill during the 1920s, and attracted to Democratic candidates during the Great Depression, after Franklin D. Roosevelt had started some of his work and welfare programs. Dyer followed Harry Coudrey, also a Republican.

=== Anti-usury law ===
Dyer continued his anti-usury campaign in 1914 by authoring a law that prevented banks from charging excessive interest rates on loans in Washington, D.C., which was then governed by Congress. Dyer believed that money lenders went after financially vulnerable people, authorizing loan contracts for unnecessary purposes. Dyer stated that usury was "an ancient moral crime against the poor and helpless." He advocated for each state to pass similar anti-usury laws.

=== Advocated postal pneumatic tube system ===
On March 29, 1916, Dyer spoke before a Senate Committee advocating H.R. 10484, to fund a U.S. Postal pneumatic tube service in St. Louis. Under the existing service, U.S. mail was transported by compressed air vacuum tubes in the St. Louis area. Dyer asked the committee to extend the pneumatic tube service from two to five miles, at a cost of $50,000. According to Dyer, the tube extension would promote business and private citizens in East St. Louis by reducing delivery time by 11 hours and 50 minutes. By comparison, the city of Boston had eight miles of U.S. Postal pneumatic tube service.

=== Anti-lynching bill ===
==== St. Louis riots 1917 ====
In May 1917, a riot broke out in St. Louis; white ethnic workers, out on strike, attacked black strikebreakers, brought in to replace them. In July, mob violence broke out in East St. Louis against blacks, also against a background of competition over jobs. Two white police officers were killed early in the confrontation. In retaliation, white mobs killed 35 blacks, mutilated the bodies, and threw them into the Mississippi River. White rioters openly targeted and lynched several blacks. Those who attempted to stop the lynchings were threatened by the white mob with physical violence. As blacks fled into St. Louis, white rioters threatened to kill them upon their return. White Illinois National Guardmen, sent to quell the riot either did nothing to stop the violence or participated in the attacks on the black community instead. One black child was shot and thrown into a burning building, while white prostitutes openly attacked black women. After the riots, of the 134 persons indicted, only nine whites who were put on trial went to prison while 12 indicted blacks who went to trial were imprisoned. Nearly one-third of the total 134 persons indicted were black. The conviction rate, mathematically, was more than doubled for blacks than for whites.

Dyer was distressed by such mob violence, with its disregard for the courts and the rule of law. His district in St. Louis had mostly African-American residents and he wanted to protect his constituents and other citizens. Many black people from his district had migrated to St. Louis from the South, in the exodus known as the Great Migration. They settled in St. Louis along with immigrants from southern and eastern Europe where industrialization had led to a strong economy and an increase in jobs. Dyer also knew of the continuing high rate of lynchings, mostly of blacks by whites in the South. Working with W. E. B. Du Bois and Walter White of the National Association for the Advancement of Colored People (NAACP), who had been working on a national anti-lynching campaign, Dyer helped develop and agreed to sponsor anti-lynching legislation.

==== Dyer Anti-Lynching Bill introduced 1918 ====
Calling for an end to mob violence, on April 1, 1918, Dyer introduced the Dyer Anti-Lynching Bill, which would have made lynching a federal crime. In his speech, he anticipated some members likely objections about the federal government sponsoring "social" legislation, and noted that lynching violated individuals' rights under the 14th Amendment. In addition, he noted that Congress had passed child labor laws and the Prohibition amendment. He said:

If Congress has felt its duty to do these things, why should it not also assume jurisdiction and enact laws to protect the lives of citizens of the United States against lynch law and mob violence? Are the rights of property, or what a citizen shall drink, or the ages and conditions under which children shall work, any more important to the Nation than life itself?

Black leaders in the North had insisted that the Republican Party National platform for the presidential election of 1920 include support for anti-lynching legislation. After the election, the black community complained when months passed without Harding's getting a bill introduced and passed by Congress.

Dyer introduced a revised version of the bill in the House of Representatives in 1921. U.S. President Warren G. Harding, a Republican spoke in favor of Dyer's anti-lynching bill at an appearance in Birmingham, Alabama, and stated he would sign the bill if it was passed by the Senate. With high interest in the bill across the country, described as an "insistent country-wide demand", the bill passed by a large margin (230 to 119) on January 26, 1922. The first such federal legislation to gain House passage in the twentieth century, it would have enabled the federal government to prosecute the crime. Southern authorities seldom did so. In the South, most blacks had been disfranchised from 1890 to 1911 by constitutional changes and discriminatory legislation after southern Democrats regained power in the state legislatures. Unable to vote, blacks were disqualified from serving on juries or holding any political office; they had virtually no political power within the official system. In the few cases that came to trial, all-white juries generally never convicted a white of lynching a black.

Proponents of Dyer's anti-lynching bill believed that lynching and mob violence took away African-American citizens' rights under the Fourteenth Amendment. These rights included a speedy and fair trial by an impartial jury. Other citizen rights included the right to be informed of the nature of the crime accused, the ability to have witnesses in the defense's favor, and to be represented by counsel in court. Many blacks felt betrayed by the Republicans due to the bill's slow process to the Senate. A silent protest march by many blacks took place in front of the Capitol grounds and White House in 1922 while the bill's constitutionality was being contemplated. A protest sign read, "Congress discusses constitutionality while the smoke of burning bodies darkens the heavens."

==== Senate filibuster 1922 ====
U.S. Sen. Lee Slater Overman from North Carolina, Harris & Ewing, 1914. Southern Democratic senators filibustered the Dyer Anti-Lynching Bill in December 1922 and twice more to prevent its passage.

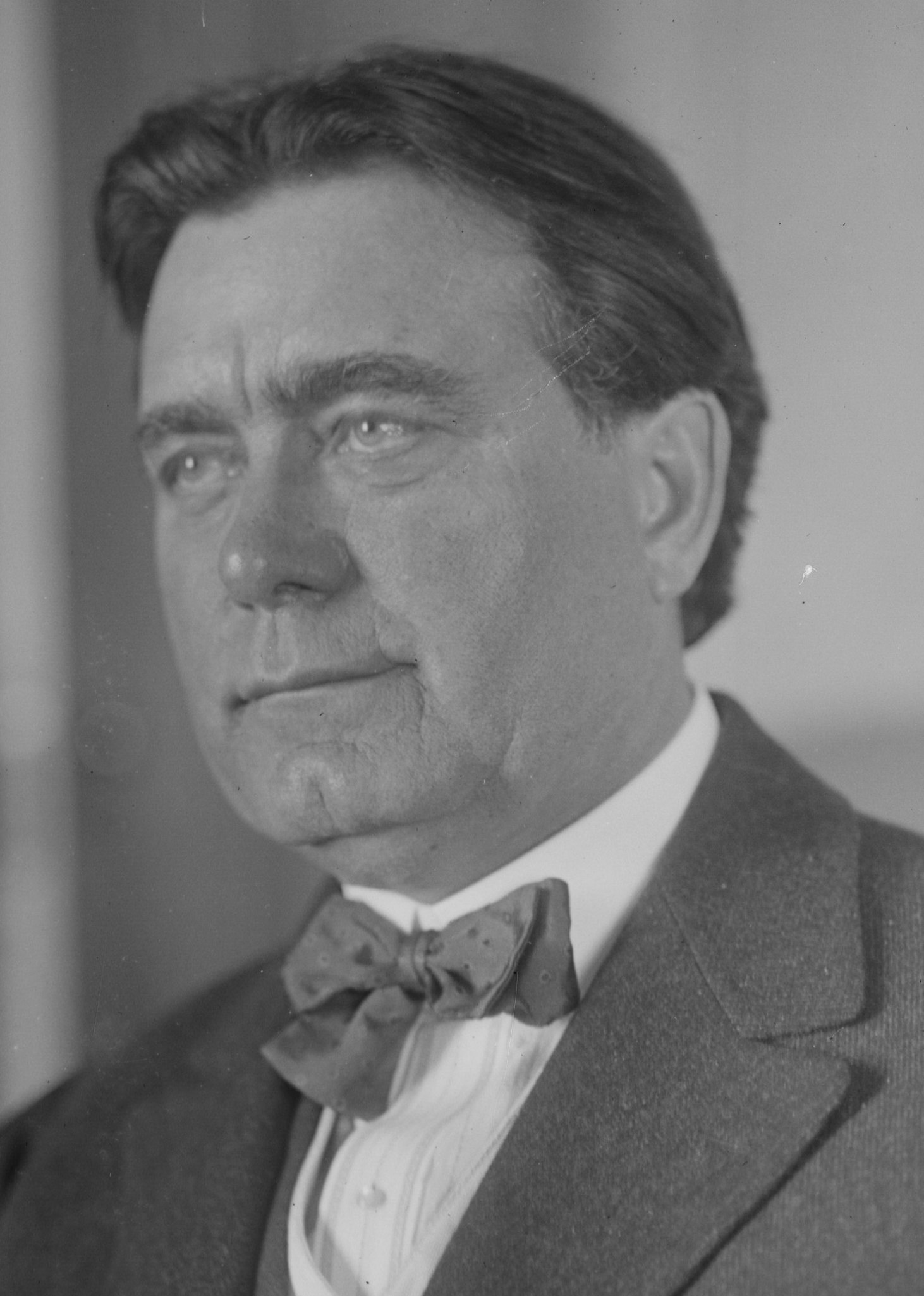
William Borah c. 1919–1925

After Dyer's bill reached the Senate and received a favorable report from the Judiciary Committee, some Republican senators, including most prominently William Borah, an otherwise progressive Senator from Idaho, spoke against it. Borah was concerned about issues of state sovereignty and believed that the bill was not constitutional. He was especially concerned about the clause that provided for federal authorities to punish state officials "remiss in the suppression of lynchings."

A prolonged filibuster by Southern white Democrats prevented consideration of the bill and defeated it. After the Democrats had held up voting on all the national business in the Senate for a week in December 1922 by their filibuster, the Republicans realized they could not overcome the tactic and finally conceded defeat on Dyer's bill. Senator Lee S. Overman of North Carolina told The New York Times that the "good negroes of the South did not want the legislation for 'they do not need it'."

==== Aftermath and legacy ====
Following the defeat of his first bill in the Senate in 1922, Dyer tried unsuccessfully twice more to get it passed by the Senate. Some of the bill's opponents claimed that the threat of lynching protected white women from sexual advances from black men. The studies by the journalist Ida B. Wells in the late 1890s had shown that black lynch victims were accused of rape or attempted rape only one third of the time. Rather, the murders of blacks were an extreme form of white extrajudicial punishment and community control, often targeting blacks who were economic competitors with whites, who were trying to advance in society, who were in debt to landowners (settlement season for sharecroppers was a time of high rates of lynchings in rural areas), or those who failed to "stay in their place". In 1919, according to the Pittsburgh Gazette Times, many Southerners viewed the practice of lynching as a sporting event.

In 1923, to gain national support for his anti-lynching bill, which was to be heard again that year in the Senate, Dyer toured the western United States to generate public support. His motto for his anti-lynching campaign was "We have just begun to fight." (This was the statement made famous by John Paul Jones.) Dyer attracted mixed black and white audiences in Denver, Portland, Los Angeles, Omaha, and Chicago. He thanked the National Association for the Advancement of Colored People (NAACP) for supporting his bill and praised their continuing to publicize the terrible human toll of lynching in the United States. In Chicago, 4000 people attended his anti-lynching rally. Dyer's campaign received positive coverage by the white mainstream press, which helped strengthen an anti-lynching movement in the West.

The national attention received by Dyer's anti-lynching bill and speaking campaign may have helped reduce lynchings in the South. More significantly, the Great Migration was underway, and black workers by the tens of thousands were leaving the South for Northern and Midwestern industrial cities, for jobs, education, and a chance to escape Jim Crow laws and violence. By 1934, when the Costigan-Wagner anti-lynching bill was introduced, lynchings had dropped to 15 per year. In 1935 and 1938, Senator Borah repeated his constitutional arguments against the bill; he added that he believed such legislation was no longer needed, because the rate of lynchings had fallen so dramatically. By 1940, 1.5 million blacks had left the South in the Great Migration. Another five million left from 1940 to 1970.

The political power of the white Democrats in the South came from their having disfranchised most blacks from 1890 to 1910. The South was essentially a one-party, Democratic region in which only whites voted and held office, well into the 1960s, but Congressional representation was based on the total population. The situation of disfranchisement did not change markedly until passage in the 1960s of federal civil rights legislation that protected and enforced the constitutional rights of voting and citizenship for African Americans and other minorities.

From 1882 to 1968 "...nearly 200 anti-lynching bills were introduced in Congress, and three passed the House. Seven presidents between 1890 and 1952 petitioned Congress to pass a federal law." None was approved by the Senate because of the powerful opposition of the Southern Democratic voting bloc. In June 2005, through passing a bipartisan resolution sponsored by senators Mary Landrieu of Louisiana and George Allen of Virginia, the US Senate officially apologized for not having passed an anti-lynching law "when it was most needed."

=== Anti-automobile theft law ===
In 1919, Dyer authored an anti-crime law that made transporting stolen cars across state borders a federal crime, to be prosecuted by federal law enforcement. In 1956, the FBI Director J. Edgar Hoover said that the law had led to the recovery of 227,752 stolen automobiles worth $212,679,296 (equivalent to $2.52 billion in 2025).

=== Advocation of Philippine independence ===
In December 1922, Dyer had traveled to the Philippines, then a U.S. territory, according to the 1898 Treaty of Paris. On December 22, he spoke before the Philippine Senate in Manila, stating that he believed the Philippines would be independent by the next Congress. He stated he favored Philippine independence. He said that the US would always "be proud of the Philippines and what we have accomplished here for the Filipinos and for the American people." The Philippines were granted commonwealth status in 1935 and finally given independence in 1946.

=== Contraband liquor stock ===
The New York Curb Exchange (NYCE) on April 10, 1929, had received a letter written by Dyer that demanded he be returned money after he had bought and sold at a loss Canadian whiskey company Hiram Walker stock. Dyer contended he did not know that the company made liquor, a contraband product in the U.S. during Prohibition and was forced to sell at a loss. He believed Hiram Walker and other company liquor stocks had been sold on the NYCE without acknowledgement that these were whiskey companies.

Dyer had voted against the Prohibition Eighteenth Amendment, the Volstead Act, the Volstead Act overriding presidential veto, and the Jones law. These laws authorized federal enforcement and essentially prohibited the sale of liquor in the United States. Saint Louis had a large beer-brewing industry, and before Prohibition, Missouri was the second-largest wine-producing state in the country. Both industries had been started and developed by German immigrants to the state. Prohibition would seriously damage the economies of Dyer's major city and state.

=== Terms and voting record ===
Dyer served 11 terms in office for Missouri's 12th District. During his second term in office, on June 19, 1914, he was suspended from taking his seat in the House of Representatives due to contested voting election returns in 1912 in Missouri's 12th District. According to The New York Times, Dyer had nothing to do with the voting fraud. The House voted to unseat Dyer, who was active in legislative work, by a 147-to-98 vote. During the vote to oust Dyer, 22 Representatives voted "present", rather than give a vote for or against. By a 126 to 108 vote to replace Dyer, the House seated a Democrat, Michael J. Gill, who took the oath of office.

Gill served in the House from June 19, 1914, until March 3, 1915. He was defeated by Dyer in the 1914 elections.

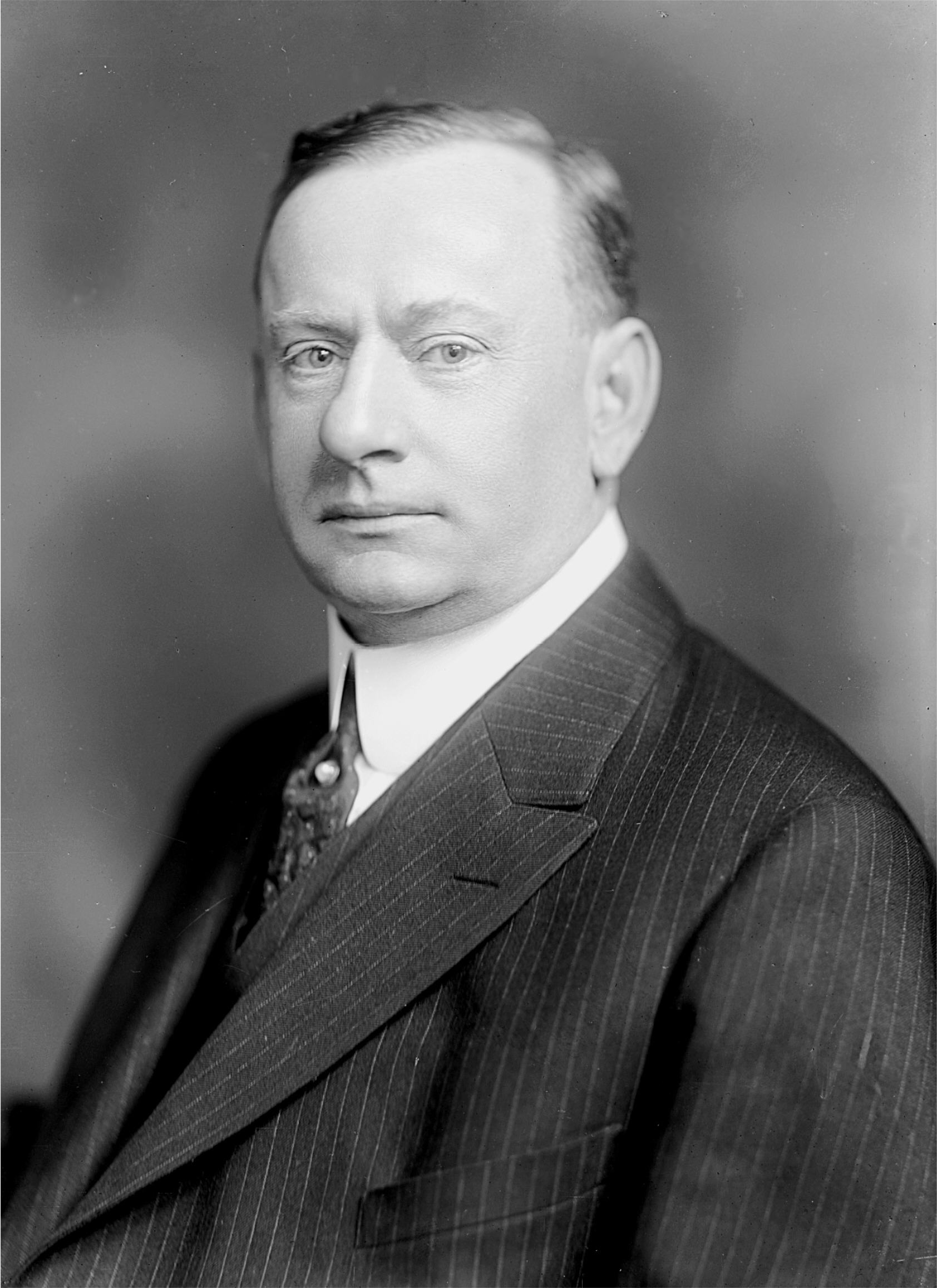
Dyer, between 1905 and 1945

| Term | Year started | Year ended |
|---|---|---|
| First | 1911 | 1913 |
| Second | 1913 | 1914 |
| Third | 1915 | 1917 |
| Fourth | 1917 | 1919 |
| Fifth | 1919 | 1921 |
| Sixth | 1921 | 1923 |
| Seventh | 1923 | 1925 |
| Eighth | 1925 | 1927 |
| Ninth | 1927 | 1929 |
| Tenth | 1929 | 1931 |
| Eleventh | 1931 | 1933 |

Dyer voted 1,556 times out of 2,035 Congressional roll calls. He missed voting 482 times, or 28%, in the Congressional time frame starting on April 5, 1911, and ending on March 1, 1933. The two time periods when Dyer missed voting 80% of the time were April–June 1912, and October–December 1922.

== Retirement from public office ==
Dyer ran unsuccessfully for re-election in 1932, 1934 and 1936, during the Great Depression. Black voters had been disappointed that the Republicans had failed to deliver on their promise to pass an anti-lynching law, part of the national platform in 1920, and by President Hoover's approach to dealing with economic problems. The administration of President Franklin D. Roosevelt attracted many voters to Democratic candidates because he was putting people to work through the Works Progress Administration and providing social aid programs.

After three successive defeats, Dyer retired from politics and returned to private law practice as an attorney.

== Death ==
Dyer died in St. Louis, on December 15, 1957, aged 86. Dyer was buried in the Oak Grove Cemetery, in St. Louis.

== General sources ==
=== Books ===
- Howard, Marilyn K.; Rucker, Walter C.; Upton, James N. (2007). Encyclopedia of American race riots. Westport, Connecticut: Greenwood Press. ISBN 978-0-313-33301-9.

=== Newspapers ===
- Morrow, James B. (June 21, 1914). "Usury The Bugbear of the Poor". Boston Daily Globe. Boston, Massachusetts. p. SM 10.

=== Internet ===
- "Anti-Lynching Legislation Renewed", Historical Essay: The Negroes' Temporary Farewell: Jim Crow and the Exclusion of African Americans from Congress, 1887–1929, Black Americans in Congress, US Congress
- "Senate Apologizes for Not Passing Anti-Lynching Laws". Fox News. Associated Press. June 13, 2005.

U.S. House of Representatives
| Preceded by Harry M. Coudrey | Member of the U.S. House of Representatives from Missouri's 12th congressional district 1911–1914 | Succeeded by Michael J. Gill |
| Preceded by Michael J. Gill | Member of the U.S. House of Representatives from Missouri's 12th congressional district 1915–1933 | Succeeded by James R. Claiborne |
