= Lucullus Circle =

The Lucullus Circle was a US society based in New York City.

== History ==
It was inaugurated on 11 December 1951 at the Waldorf-Astoria Hotel by Claude Philippe. He created the group as "he felt the city needed a simon-pure, amateur gourmet society". At the black-tie dinners, he functioned as "a cross between a benevolent dictator and a kindly father". The society was known for its wine stock and for its elaborate dinners, initially only for men, but later including the Ladies Dinner. For $250 per year, a member could attend five lavish dinners, and these dinners were attended by some of the wealthiest and most notable men in the world.

The Lucullus Circle dinners brought about a "new golden age of gastronomy", attracting some of the wealthiest businessmen in the world at the time to feast on some "six to eight food courses and two wines with each course". The third dinner occurred on 10 March 1952 in honor of the Iranian ambassador. At one dinner guests dined on gold dishes with gold knives and forks, while at another, the room was adorned with objets d'art from important collections. Members came from the arts, business, politics as well as other professions. Many of the members resided at the Waldorf Towers. "Lucullans" were characterized as the "most sensitive and cultivated palates in New York, a sometimes questionable center of civilization and sophistication". Numbering approximately 50 gentlemen at a time, the dinner attendees were prohibited from conversing about business, politics, and religion. After the first year, the Lucullus Circle lost only two members, one who died and the other who resigned due to his health.

By 1972, however the dinners had begun to lose their appeal. New York Magazine noted that the dinners were still appreciated for their "enormous stocks of wine". but that it no longer seemed to "have the appeal of the other groups". They nonetheless continued. After Philippe's death, his wife, Helga, took over planning the gentlemen's dinners, as well as coordinating the wines and greeting the attendees; she was the only woman present at these events.

== Bibliography ==
- Atlantic Monthly Company (1977). The Atlantic Monthly. Atlantic Monthly Company.
- Avery, Jeanne (1 December 2004). Astrological Aspects. American Federation of Astr. ISBN 978-0-86690-553-4.
- Hines, Duncan (1955). Duncan Hines' Food Odyssey. Crowell.
- Heublein, Inc. (1981). Premiere National Auction of Rare Wines. Vol. 11. Heublein.
- Jacobson, Julius H. (2008). The Classical Music Experience. Sourcebooks, Inc. ISBN 978-1-4022-4809-2.
- Lang, George (December 2005). Nobody Knows the Truffles I've Seen. iUniverse. ISBN 978-0-595-37743-5.
- New York Media, LLC (23 October 1972). "New York Magazine". Newyorkmetro.com. New York Media, LLC. ISSN 0028-7369.
- Sutton, Horace (1953). Confessions of a Grand Hotel: The Waldorf-Astoria. Holt.
- University of Texas at Austin (1995). The Library chronicle of the University of Texas at Austin. Humanities Research Center, University of Texas at Austin.
