= Michael Joseph Gill =

American politician (1864–1918)

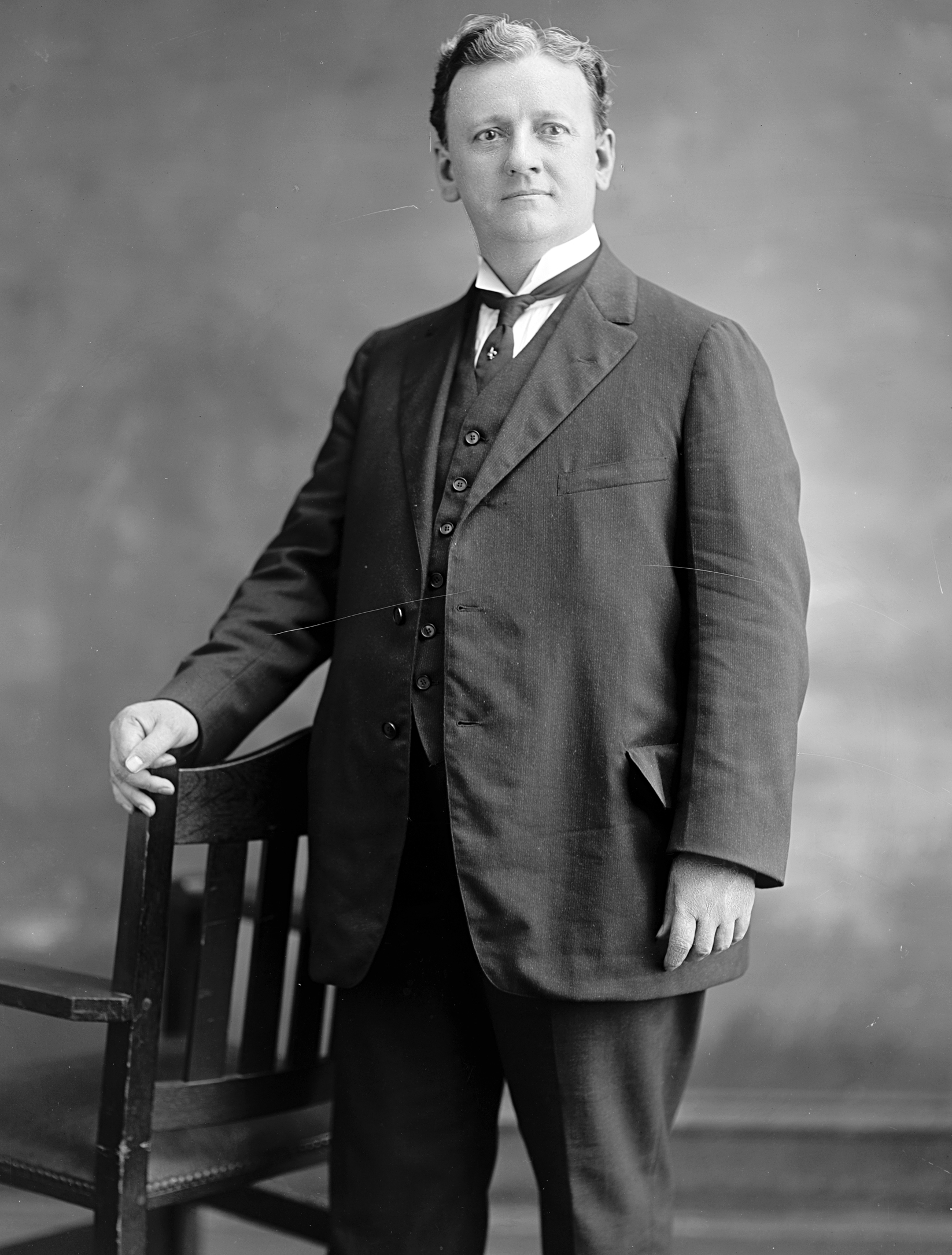
- Gill c. 1905–1918

Member of the U.S. House of Representatives from Missouri's 12th district
- In office June 19, 1914 – March 3, 1915
- Preceded by: Leonidas C. Dyer
- Succeeded by: Leonidas C. Dyer

Member of the Missouri House of Representatives
- In office 1892–1896

Personal details
- Born: December 5, 1864 Covington, Kentucky, U.S.
- Died: November 1, 1918 (aged 53) St. Louis, Missouri, U.S.
- Resting place: Calvary Cemetery
- Party: Democratic
- Profession: Politician, bureaucrat

Michael Joseph Gill (December 5, 1864 – November 1, 1918) was an American politician and bureaucrat from Missouri.

Gill was born in Covington, Kentucky and attended the common schools and Oberlin College. He then engaged in the glass manufacturing business and became an executive member of the National Bottle Blowers' Association in 1892–1912.

He moved to St. Louis, MO and entered into politics, serving in the Missouri state house of representatives in 1892–1896. In 1898 he ran for Congress in Missouri's 10th District and lost. He later served as delegate to the Democratic National Convention in 1912.

He ran for Congress again in 1912 in the 12th District and appeared to lose to Leonidas C. Dyer, but he contested the election claiming fraud. During the investigation of the 1910 race, which was also contested, it was somehow discovered that Gill had voted for Dyer over the Democrat, Thomas Kinney. This discovery came to light after Kinney had died and Gill had been nominated in the 1912 race. Though he denied it, Gill drew the ire of Democratic leaders, including Kinney's brother, who illegally scratched Gill's name from many ballots. The committee found that "The evidence establishes the fact that a conspiracy was formed and existed between the judges and clerks of election in many of the precincts of the fifth ward to deprive Gill of votes cast for him and if possible to count him out" and once fraudulent votes were excluded Gill was named the winner. He was sworn in to the Sixty-third Congress and served from June 19, 1914, to March 3, 1915. He ran again in 1914, 1916 and 1918, losing in the primary every time - though he was the Democratic nominee in 1916 anyway.

After leaving Congress, he briefly served as government labor conciliator from March 31 to May 31, 1916, and from July 1 to October 2, 1916.

He died in St. Louis, Missouri, November 1, 1918, and was interred in Calvary Cemetery.

U.S. House of Representatives
Preceded by Leonidas C. Dyer	Member of the U.S. House of Representatives from Missouri's 12th congressional district 1914–1915	Succeeded by Leonidas C. Dyer
