= Poppy Cannon =

South African-born author

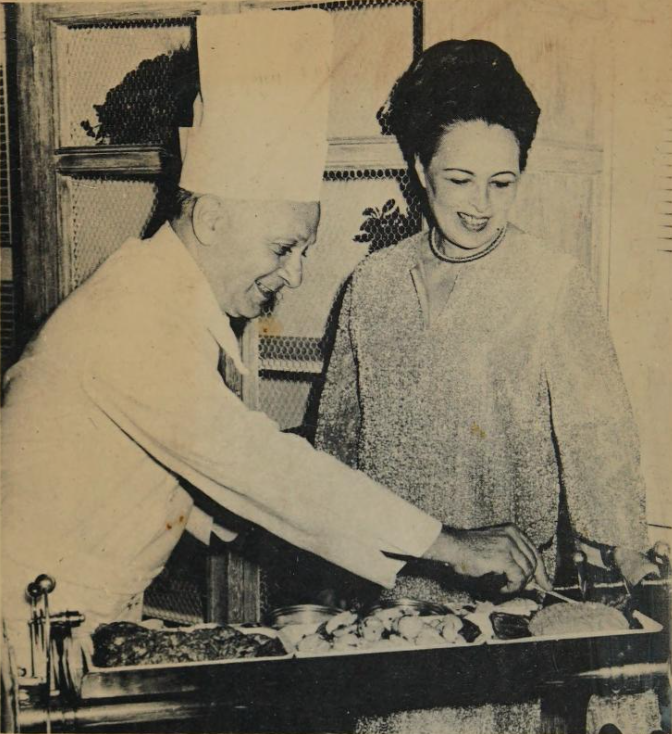
Cannon circa 1968

Poppy Cannon (August 2, 1905 – April 1, 1975) was a South African-born American author, at various times the food editor of the Ladies Home Journal and House Beautiful, and the author of several 1950s cookbooks. She was an early proponent of convenience food: her books included The Can Opener Cookbook (1951) and The Bride's Cookbook (1954). Other books included The President's Cookbook: Practical Recipes from George Washington to the Present (1968).

== Career ==
Her writing style was distinctive and has been described as "relentless." Her recipes might call for such measurements as "a splotch of wine," "a flurry of coconut," or "a great swish of sour cream," and she once advised readers that they could "rassle a lemon pie in a jiff" with "the new wonderstuff called Clovernook."

She was a contemporary of James Beard and Julia Child, and she collaborated with Alice B. Toklas on Aromas and Flavors of the Past and Present.

== Biography ==
Poppy Cannon was born Lillian Gruskin in Cape Town as part of a large Lithuanian Jewish community in South Africa. Her parents had been called Robert and Henrietta Gruskin, but had apparently changed their names to Robert and Marion Whitney at the time of their immigration to Pittsburgh, Pennsylvania, in 1908. Her sister Anne Fogarty became a popular fashion designer during the 1950s. Cannon's parents were not present for parts of her childhood: her father abandoned the family by the time she was 14, and her mother was intermittently institutionalized due to ongoing mental health issues.

Poppy Cannon married four times and had three children. Her third husband was restaurateur Claude Philippe of the Waldorf Astoria New York, with whom she had a daughter, Claudia. In 1949 she became the second wife of the NAACP leader Walter Francis White (with whom she had an affair while he was married to his first wife, Leah Gladys Powell White) at a time when such a marriage was viewed as scandalous, not least within the Black community, some of whom viewed White's marriage to a white woman as a betrayal. The couple lived in New York until White's death in 1955. She wrote a biography of White, Gentle Knight, published the following year. (According to the family history of her fourth husband, he was descended from the ninth president.)

Cannon died on April 1, 1975, after falling from the 23rd-floor balcony of her apartment in New York City. She was 69 years old, and had been in failing health in recent years.

== Sources ==
- Stewart, Claire (2021). "Consuming Poppy Cannon". In Harde, Roxanne; Wesselius, Janet (eds.). Consumption and the Literary Cookbook. New York and Abingdon, Oxon: Routledge. ISBN 978-0-367-63530-5.
