= The Fire in the Flint =

1924 book by Walter White

- Author: Walter Francis White
- Language: English
- Genre: Fiction, medical fiction, bildungsromans
- Publisher: Knopf
- Publication date: 1924
- Publication place: United States
- Pages: 300 (1996 University of Georgia Press Edition)
- ISBN: 9-780-8203-1742-7

The Fire in the Flint is a 1924 novel by civil rights activist and writer Walter White, it was published by Knopf. The novel was written during the Harlem Renaissance and contains themes consistent with the New Negro Movement as well as promoting anti-racist themes and shedding light on racial oppression during the early 20th century. The novel tells the story of Dr. Kenneth Harper, an African American doctor and World War I veteran, who moves back to his hometown in Georgia to open a clinic and practice medicine after graduating from medical school. Dr. Harper, who is initially unwilling to be involved in racial tensions in the town, eventually fights against the Ku Klux Klan after he is subjected to hostile racism from the white residents.

== Reception ==
The book was received positively among many literary critics and civil rights activists. Writing for the magazine The Crisis, W.E.B. Du Bois hailed the novel as "a stirring story and a strong bit of propaganda against the white Klansman and the black pussyfoot." Writing for The Nation, Konrad Bercovici stated that the novel was "the voice of the new Negro". Sinclair Lewis called it one of the two most important books of the autumn. Historian Kevin Boyle, in his 2004 book Arc of Justice stated: "The novel's publication was one of the signal events of the Harlem Renaissance's breakthrough year. Somerset Maugham stated it was "a terrible book, but a very powerful one, and it gives one a tragic feeling of truth." However, the book was not well received amongst many southern newspapers published for a white readership, with one newspaper in Georgia calling it "A book of lies".
