= April in Paris Ball =

Annual American gala event

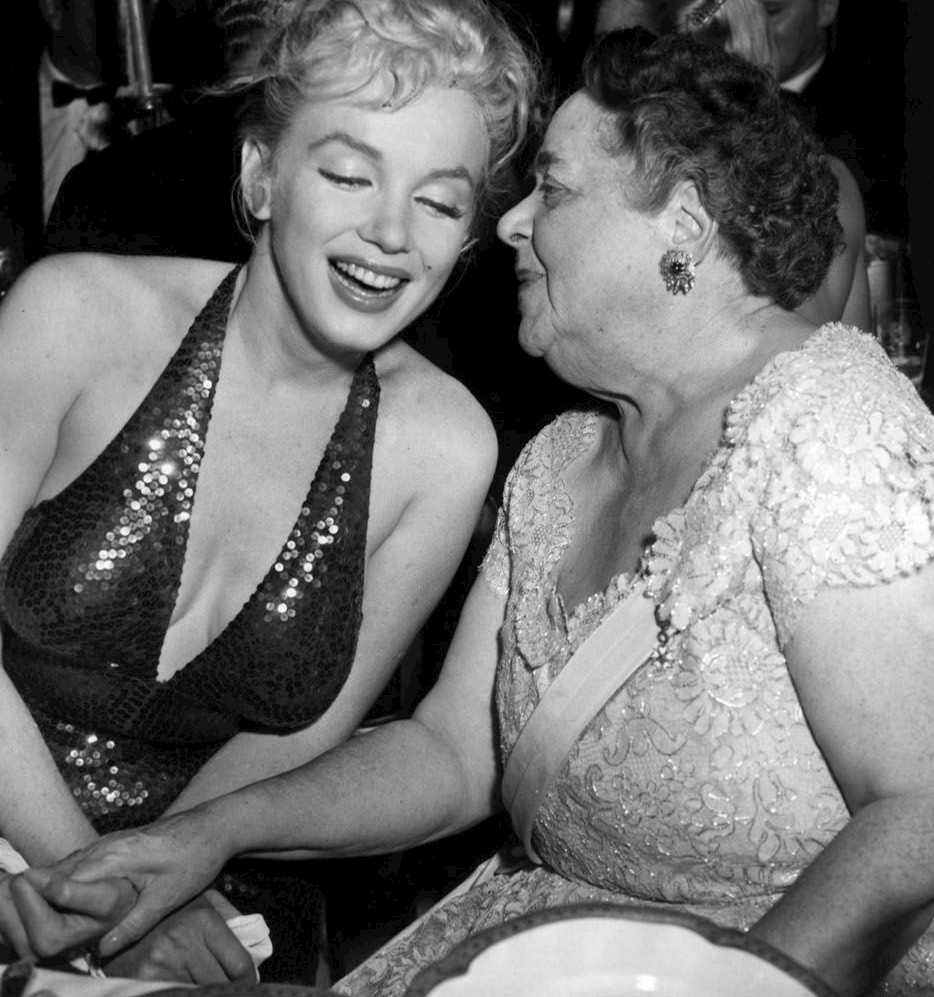
Marilyn Monroe with organizer Elsa Maxwell at the 1957 April in Paris Ball

The April in Paris Ball was an annual US gala event whose mission was to serve charity and Franco-American relations. Established in 1952 at the Waldorf Astoria New York in New York City, it was the idea of Claude Philippe, the hotel's banquet manager, who enlisted Elsa Maxwell to help organize it.

The first event was a celebration of the 2,000th birthday of the city of Paris and was held in 1951. When it was decided to make the ball an annual event, the name was changed to the April in Paris Ball.

== Organization ==
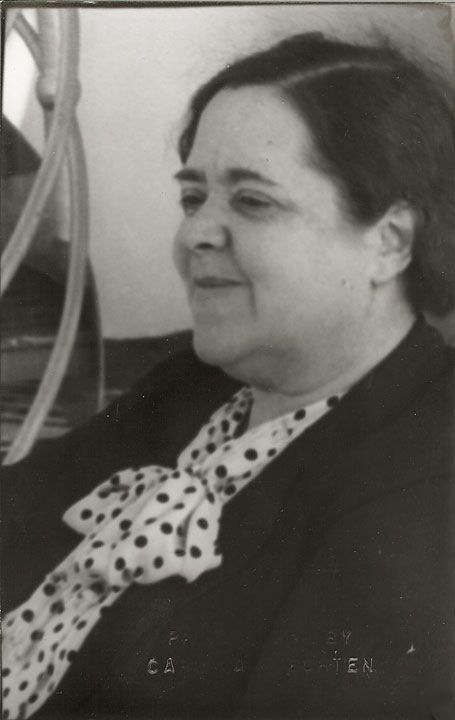
Organizer Elsa Maxwell

The April in Paris Ball was the brainchild of Claude Philippe, the banquet manager of the prestigious Waldorf Astoria, with the chief goal being to improve Franco-American relations, to share cultures, and to help provide assistance to US and French charities, aside from commemorating the 2000th anniversary of the founding of Paris. The first ball was called the Paris Birthday Ball and was held on May 7, 1951. When the ball became an annual event, its name became the April in Paris Ball. While the hotel's management handled invitations and publicity, other details were coordinated by socialites. Elsa Maxwell was given the primary responsibility in organizing it. Mrs. William C. T. Gaynor served as general chairman of the ball in 1954-57.

It was initially held annually in April, but according to Ann Vaccaro, former executive director of the ball, it was changed to October because "Mr. Philippe decided that because there are so many balls in the spring he would make it in October". After being changed to October, it often marked the start of the US fall social season. It was staged in the Grand Ballroom at the Waldorf for eight years before moving to the Hotel Astor in 1960, the Seventh Regiment Armory in 1961, and other venues.

The ball was designed to cater for "very, very high-class people" according to Vaccaro. Raffle tickets cost US$100 per person and offered opulent prizes such as a US$5000 bracelet and other jewels, expensive furs, perfumes and even cars. In the 1960 event, prizes given included a Ford Thunderbird car, a Chinchilla coat, a Renault Dauphine, a TV Hi-Fi system, an electric typewriter, 25 cases of expensive French wines, original paintings and porcelains, jewels, clocks, evening bags and a pedigree poodle, with gift boxes given to guests which included gold key rings and jewelry, champagne and brandy, Maxim ashtrays, pipes, silver bottle openers, hats and scarves, and flowers. Every guest was said to have gone home with at least one gift in return. In the 1979 event, some US$106,000 worth of prizes were given out. Over its history, the ball, which was exempt from tax, earned millions of dollars, which went primarily to over 20 American charities such as the American Cancer Society, with 15 to 20% going towards French charities. A staff of three people were paid full-time throughout the year to organize it. Of the expenses of the ball, founder Philippe stated "We charge the most, give the most, and make the most — it's a success formula". Bernard F. Gimbel served as chief treasurer.

== Events ==
=== 1952 ===
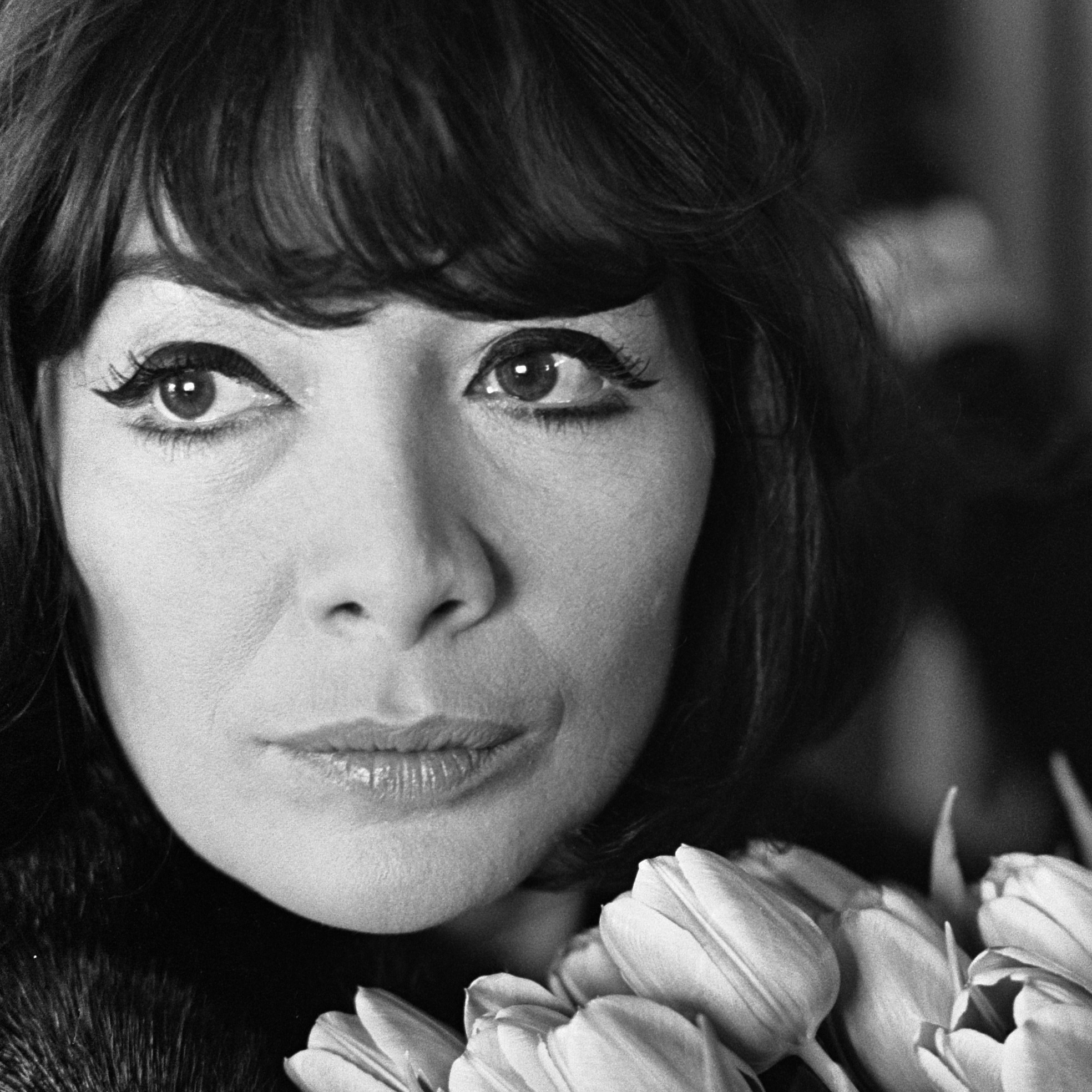
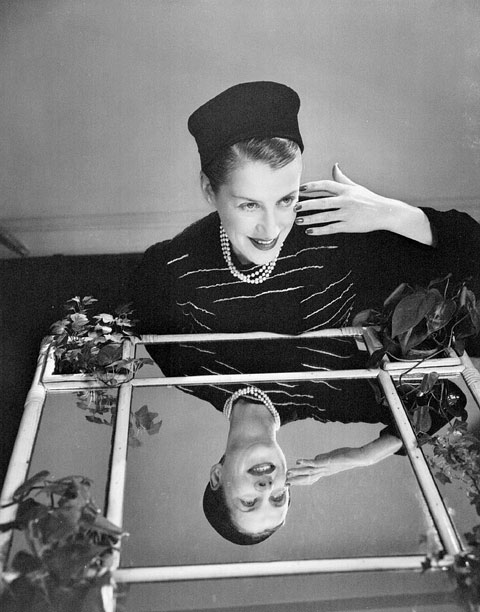
Juliette Gréco (left) and Beatrice Lillie (right) starred in the inaugural ball of 1952

The initial show, held on 9 April 1952, featured a "three-hour spectacular of five tableaux, directed by Stuart Chaney", [depicting] a twelfth century scene of troubadours at the court of Eleanor of Aquitaine, Henry VIII's meeting at the Field of the Cloth of Gold, Louis XIV at Versailles, and a fashion show of forty creations by Dior, Fath, Balmain, Dessès and Givenchy". Most of designer Jean Desses' mid-season collection was shown at the ball before his Paris showings in May. Court jesters, singers, numerous dancers, dwarf wrestlers, jousters, trained animals loaned by John Ringling, and three dozen Scotch pipers were also a feature. French stars Juliette Gréco, Jean Sablon, Beatrice Lillie, John Loder, and many others were flown over for the ball. Maxwell and Lillie, dressed as a beturbaned maharajah from India and a harem girl, arrived with brooms and buckets, following an elephant. The coatroom charge was a surprise to the guests; instead of the usual two bits, it was raised to US$0.35 per item.

=== 1953 ===
The second ball, held on 20 April 1953 was organized to celebrate the 400th anniversary of the death of French Renaissance writer and humanist François Rabelais. A spectacular of six tableaux were put on, consisting of Le Moyen Age, with costumes by Marcel Rochas, Le Cardinal aux Chats, with costumes by Jacques Fath, Dans les Jardins de Marly, with costumes by Jeanne Lanvin, Les Chinois a Versailles, with costumes by Nina Ricci and Arturo López Willshaw, Cendrillon de Paris, a fashion show featuring gowns by Balenciaga, Balmain, Desses, Diro, Fath, Givenchy, Gres, Lanvin, Patou and Schiaparelli and hats by Gilbert Orcel, Legroux Soeurs, Paulette and Caroline Reboux, and finally a François Rabelais play, starring Walter Slezak as Rabelais, Tom Ewell as Panurge, Betsy von Furstenberg as Lady Dantern, Albert Hecht as Friar John, and John Cromwell as Bird. The Ringling Bros. and Barnum & Bailey Circus provided a gymnast, dwarf, a juggler, a gargantua and animals. Roger Dunn, Tyrone Power and Reginald Gardiner were invited to conduct the master of ceremonies, with special mention to French actress Suzy Delair. Furniture, tapestries and banners from 17th and 18th century France were provided by French & Co., Lace and Tulle by the Federation Nationale Francaise de Dentelles Tulles Broderies et Passementeries, and jewels by Cartier.

=== 1954 ===
Robert Joffrey fitted out the ballroom as the court of Versailles for the 1954 ball, with students from the Joffrey Ballet and American Ballet Theatre as performers, and Victor Borge cast as Louis XIV. With Audrey Hepburn too ill to perform as John Paul Jones, Gloria Vanderbilt stepped in at the last minute, which impressed Gilbert Miller. Jacqueline Kennedy was an attendee.

=== 1957 and 1958 ===
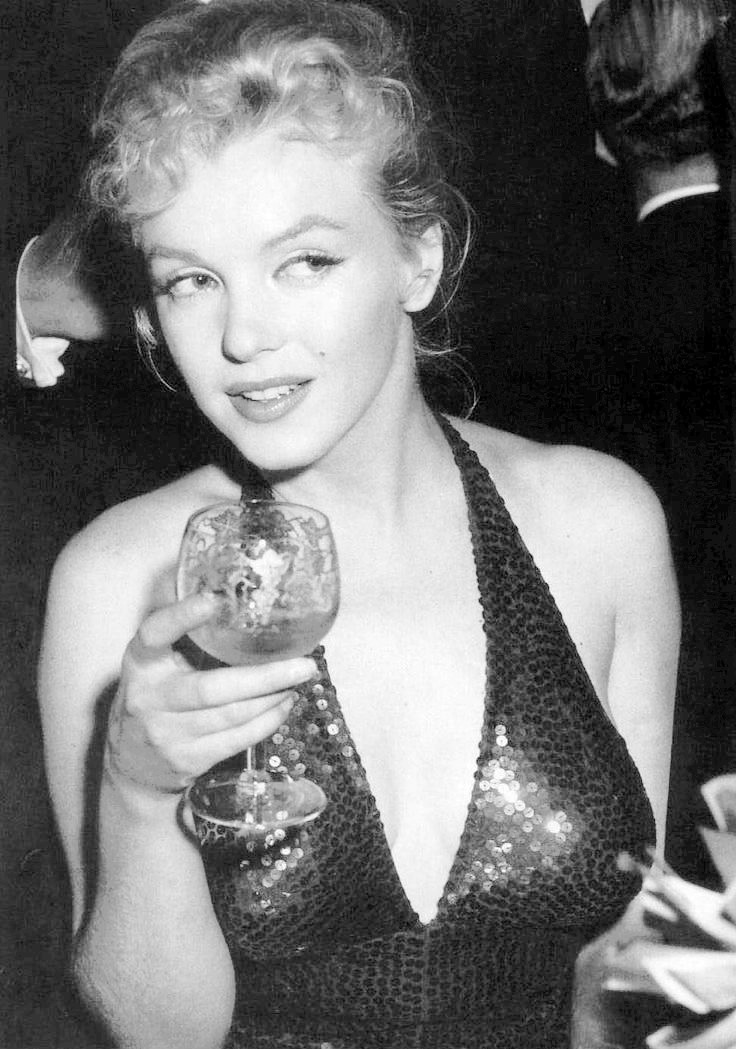
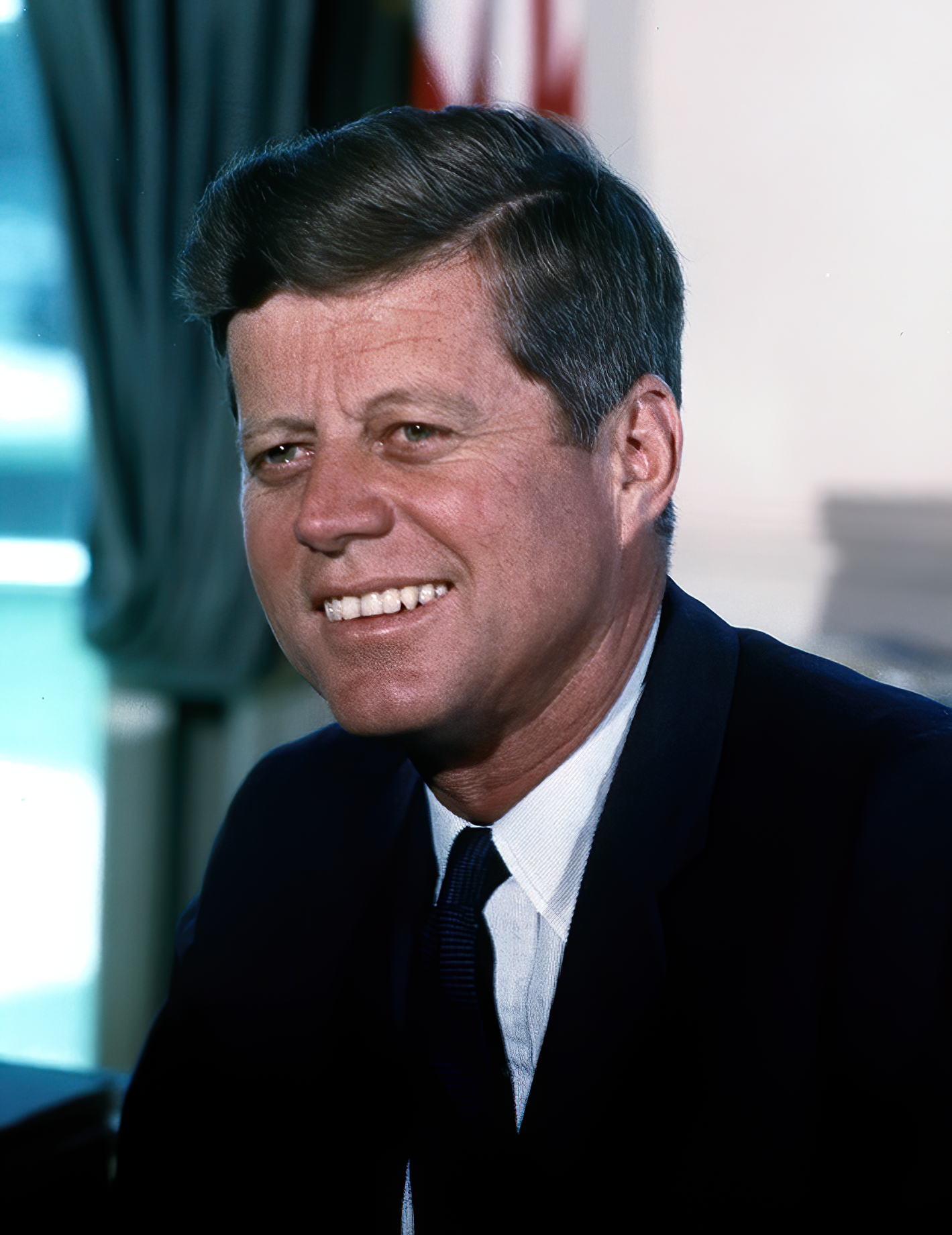
Marilyn Monroe and John F. Kennedy attended the 1957 ball

The 1957 event, attended by Senator John F. Kennedy, his wife, Jackie, and Marilyn Monroe, included 1300 guests, who paid $100 each and donated $130,000 to charities; the Duke and Duchess of Windsor attended as well. The Duchess and Elsa Maxwell had reportedly had a major falling out at another ball four years earlier and sat far apart from each other and didn't speak even when they were in the elevator together. The Duke and Duchess were the guests of honor and were seated at the most visible table in the ballroom. One article in The Times Standard even claimed that Maxwell had invited Monroe to the ball to publicly embarrass the Duchess; when Monroe arrived more than 30 photographer abandoned her to photograph Monroe. After the ball, a wealthy New York broker offered to donate $50,000 to charity if Maxwell and the Duchess would abandon their feud and shake hands in front of press photographers. Maxwell was most willing to end the quarrel in this way, but the Duchess declined the offer. The following year, the ballroom was decorated with 30 feet (9.1 m) high chestnut trees. The event brought in US$170,000 for charities.

=== 1959 ===
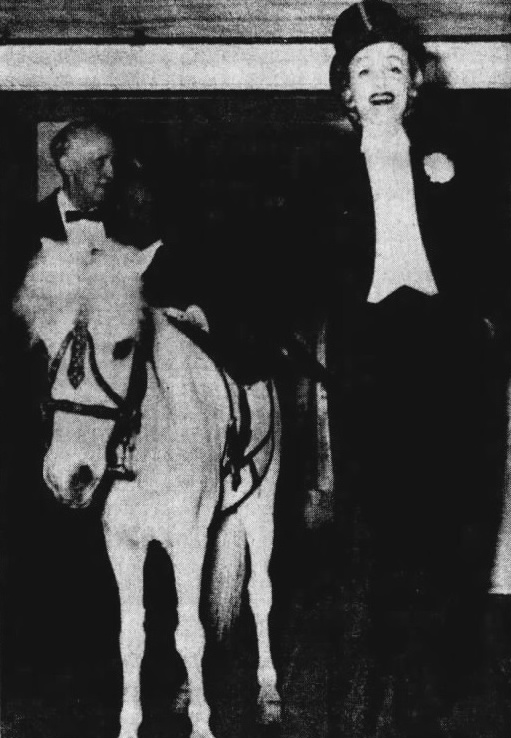
Dietrich at the April in Paris Ball in 1959

The 1959 ball, the final one to be held at the Waldorf on 10 April 1959, centred around the theme of the Parisian circus of the 18th century. 1000 people attended, paying $150 per ticket. Genuine circus costumes from the period were flown over from France, and the ball featured Marlene Dietrich as a ringmaster in trousers, a waistcoat, top hat and white gloves. Dietrich sang two Maurice Chevalier songs, "Louise" and "Mimi". Cecil Beaton designed a big top of ruby velvet with a "hedge of colored fountains" and thousands of purple flowers.

=== 1960 ===
Due to conflict between Philippe and the Waldorf-Astoria staff, he was exiled from the Waldorf in 1960, and the ball was moved to the Hotel Astor that year, where the likes of Dietrich, Maurice Chevalier, Joan Crawford and organizer Elsa Maxwell helped transform it into the Paris Opera House. A photomural of the Paris Opera House was "mounted on plywood and superimposed in front of Astor Hotel creating the illusion of [the] actual opera house", and photomurals of the interior completed the transformation. Held on 9 April 1960 under the title of Un Bal Masque a l'Opéra de Paris, the show featured a series of tableaux entitled L'Elegance de Paris, with costumes by Revillon, La Couture, with designs by Pierre Cardin, Jean Desses, Christian Dior, Gres, Jacques Heim, Hermès, Guy LaRoche, Nina Ricci and Jean Patou, La Couleur Opera, featuring "La Cabaret de l'Aurore" and the Lester Lanin orchestra and the US premiere of the 1735 Jean-Philippe Rameau French opera-ballet "Les Indes Galantes", starring Mony Dalmes, Jean-Pierre Aumont and Jean Jacques Strauss, Les Fleurs, with Parisian and European opera and ballet stars such as Claude Besny, Pierre LaCotte, George Zoritch, Judith Raskin, and Madeleine Rizzo, and finally Les Savages & La Chaconne, featuring Cathryn Damon, Dorothy Straiger, Constance Carpenter, Gretchen Wyler, Charlton Heston and Myles Easton.

=== Later balls ===
Several ball committee members felt that the name of the ball should be changed, since it was no longer held in April, but in the fall. In 1968, the ball's name was changed to Bal de l'Amitie. The new name lasted only one year and it once more became known as the April in Paris ball in 1969. Moune de Rivel fr was invited to the 1970 event, while in 1973, Josephine Baker was its star. Russell Edwards of The New York Times stated that even in 1974 the Paris Ball "remains the most prestigious, with its national and international guest list, but not necessarily the most social".
