= Elsa Maxwell =

American gossip columnist and author (1883–1963)

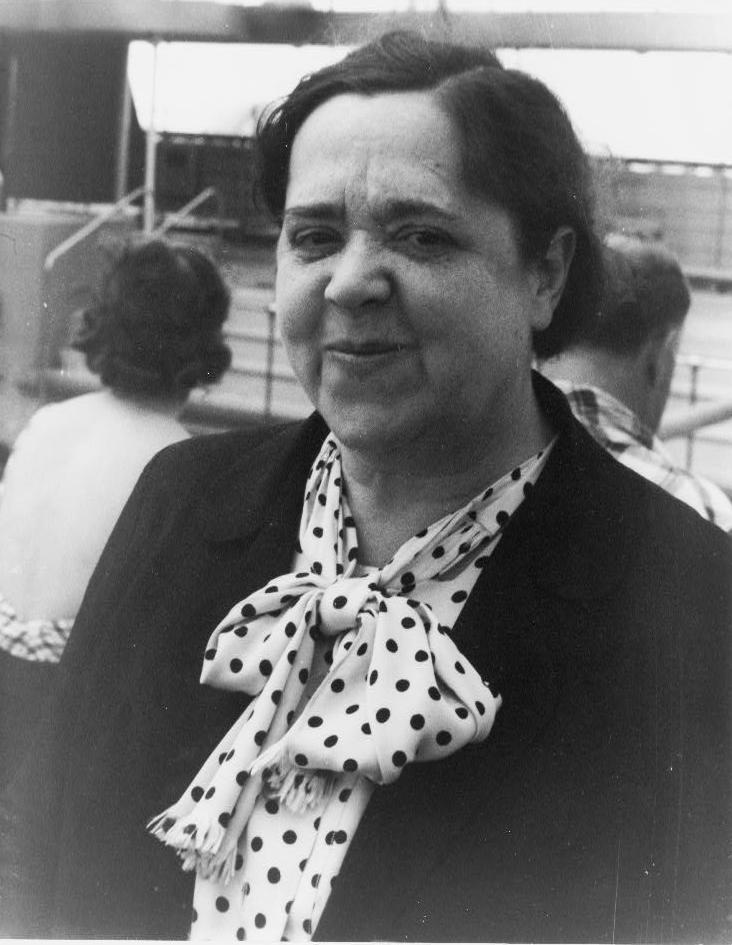
- Maxwell photographed by Carl van Vechten in 1935
- Born: May 24, 1883; Keokuk, Iowa, U.S.
- Died: November 1, 1963 (aged 80); New York City, U.S.
- Occupations: Gossip columnist, author, songwriter, hostess, screenwriter, radio personality

Elsa Maxwell (May 24, 1883 – November 1, 1963) was an American gossip columnist and author, songwriter, screenwriter, radio personality and professional hostess renowned for her parties for royalty and high society figures of her day.

Maxwell is credited with the introduction of the scavenger hunt and treasure hunt for use as party games in the modern era. Her radio program, Elsa Maxwell's Party Line, began in 1942; she also wrote a syndicated gossip column, based at the New York Post, beginning that same year. She appeared as herself in the films Stage Door Canteen (1943) and Rhapsody in Blue (1945), as well as co-starring in the film Hotel for Women (1939), for which she wrote the screenplay and a song.

== Biography ==
In spite of the persistent rumor that Elsa Maxwell was born in a theater in Keokuk, Iowa, during a performance of the opera Mignon, she actually admitted late in life that the outlandish story was a fabrication that she went along with, since she was actually born at her maternal grandmother's home in the same town. She was raised in San Francisco, where her father sold insurance and did freelance writing for the New York Dramatic Mirror. Maxwell never completed grammar school because her father did not believe in formal education; as a result, he tutored his daughter at home. Her interest in parties began when she was 12 years old and was told she would not be invited to a party because her family was poor. She developed a gift for staging games and diversions at parties for the rich, and began making a living devising treasure-hunt parties, come-as-your-opposite parties and other sorts, including a scavenger hunt in Paris in 1927 that inadvertently created disturbances all over the city.

In Venice in the early 1920s, Maxwell attracted stars like Cole Porter, Tallulah Bankhead, Noël Coward and Fanny Brice to Venice's Lido shoreline to enjoy its daytime amenities and nightly parties. Later, the principality of Monaco employed Maxwell's services to put it on the map as a tourist destination as she had done for the Lido. Maxwell and Porter were lifelong friends, and he mentioned her in several of his songs, including "I'm Throwing a Ball Tonight" from Panama Hattie (sung by Ethel Merman) and "I'm Dining with Elsa (and her ninety-nine most intimate friends)." She is also mentioned in Rodgers and Hart's "I Like to Recognize the Tune" from Too Many Girls, Irving Berlin's "The Hostess With the Mostes' on the Ball" from Call Me Madam and in "Listen, Cosette!" from Sherry!

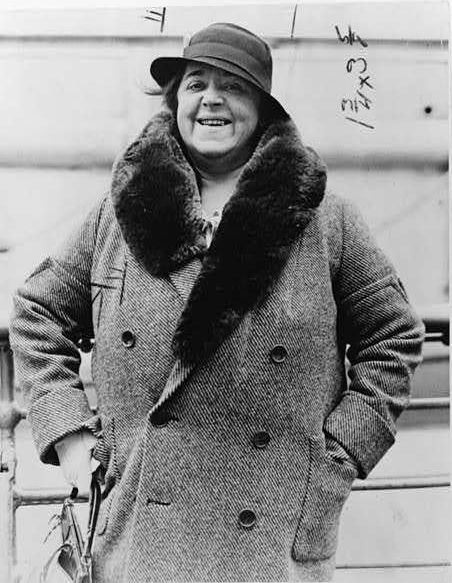
Elsa Maxwell, 1933

Returning to the U.S., Maxwell worked on movie shorts during the Depression, unsuccessfully. "Her imprimatur of social acceptability carried so much weight that the Waldorf Astoria gave her a suite rent-free when it opened in New York in 1931 at the height of the Depression, hoping to attract rich clients because of her." Following World War II, she gained an audience of millions as a newspaper gossip columnist. Beginning in 1942 she also hosted a radio program, Elsa Maxwell's Party Line, for which Esther Bradford Aresty was a writer and producer.

French writer, Simone de Beauvoir, met her at a Los Angeles party in March of 1947 and described her as "A heavy, voluble old lady, her bulk none too well hidden in black satin, she embodies all the faults of America with non of its virtues. She is almost a caricature. [...] 'In America' she says, 'no one needs to read because no one thinks. Look at me -- hundreds of thousands of people think nothing but what I tell them to think in my daily column, and I myself don't think. It's find this way. People who think are wasting their time -- it's anarchy. [...] Her optimism brings her a great deal of money and prestige. Even the sight of Buchenwald would not have shaken such a comfortable faith."

Maxwell was responsible for the success of ventriloquist Edgar Bergen. Bergen had been playing small theaters for 17 years; when he decided to ask for Maxwell's help, he was persistent enough in his telephone calls that Maxwell agreed to meet with him. When Bergen arrived, Maxwell asked him if he was a singer; Bergen replied that he was a ventriloquist and told her he wanted her to meet Charlie McCarthy. Charlie's meeting with Maxwell was an instant success; Maxwell asked crooner Rudy Vallée to find him a place on his radio program.

Maxwell was a closeted lesbian who publicly condemned same-sex love despite enjoying an almost 50-year partnership with the Scottish singer Dorothy Fellowes-Gordon ("Dickie"). The two met in 1912 and remained together until Maxwell's death.

In the 1950s, her friendship with the Duke of Windsor and Wallis Simpson, the Duchess of Windsor, attracted much publicity in the United States, as did her long running feud with the Duchess. She had encountered the Duke several times when he was the Prince of Wales, and became acquainted with him and the Duchess in 1946 when they were all living at the Waldorf Astoria Apartments in New York. They became friends the following year, in France. The Duke and Duchess frequently entertained her and sometimes Fellowes-Gordon at their chateau on the Riviera and over the coming years they attended Elsa's parties in Paris, Monte Carlo, New York and elsewhere.

A fall-out between Elsa and Wallis was first reported in May 1953, rumored to have started at a charity event the previous January, although reports from that event suggest they were friendly. Over the next few years the feud was much detailed in US gossip columns. In April 1957, Cholly Knickerbocker announced there had been a "peace treaty" between them. It followed a reconciling letter from Elsa after newspapers accused her of deliberately trying to upstage Wallis by inviting her to a party and then getting Marilyn Monroe to make a grand late entrance, driving all attention away from Wallis.

Maxwell took credit for introducing Rita Hayworth to Prince Aly Khan in the summer of 1948. In 1953, Maxwell published a single issue of her magazine, Elsa Maxwell's Café Society, which had a portrait of Zsa Zsa Gabor on the cover. Anne Edwards's biography of Maria Callas (Callas, 2001) and Peter Evans's biography of Aristotle Onassis both claim that Maxwell introduced Callas to Onassis. Edwards also claims that Maxwell fell obsessively in love with Callas, 40 years Maxwell's junior. Callas biographer Stelios Galatopoulos produced love letters from Maxwell written to Callas, who was less than receptive.

Maxwell told interviewer Mike Wallace in 1957:

I did not feel fit, to be only married. I belong to the world. I knew it instinctively when I was quite young. I belong to the world. Certainly I am the most shall we say immodestly, [among] the best-known people in the entire world today. Why, because I did not marry and I felt that I was not for marriage. It wasn't my ... thing to do.

In the late 1950s, Loretta Swit worked as Maxwell's personal secretary.

She died of heart failure in a Manhattan hospital. Maxwell's last public appearance came a week before her death. She attended the annual April in Paris Ball, which she had helped found, in a wheelchair. Fellowes-Gordon was Maxwell's sole heir. She is buried at Ferncliff Cemetery, Hartsdale, New York.

== Filmography ==
Elsa Maxwell appeared as herself in all of these films unless otherwise noted.

- Hotel for Women (1939) as Mrs. Tilford
- Public Deb No. 1 (1940)
- The Lady and the Lug (1941) (short subject)
- Throwing a Party (1941) (short subject)
- Stage Door Canteen (1943)
- Rhapsody in Blue (1945)
- Main Street to Broadway (1953)

== References in popular culture ==
In Action Comics, number 3 (1938) by Jerome Siegel and Joe Shuster a partygoer comments "Elsa Maxwell has nothing on Blakely when it comes to throwing a novel party".

Lyricist Tom Adair referenced Maxwell in the song "Will You Still Be Mine" (first recorded by Tommy Dorsey in 1941). The song's fourth chorus has the following lines: "When Elsa's parties are no fun / When FDR declines to run / When Eleanor of 'My Day' is done / Will you still be mine?"

In The Second Confession by Rex Stout, published in September 1949, Nero Wolfe's assistant Archie Goodwin references Elsa Maxwell after being congratulated for helping a more slender woman out of the pool.

Elsa Maxwell was the name of Higa Jiga's goat that was used to test the sweet potato brandy in the 1956 movie Teahouse of the August Moon, starring Marlon Brando and Glenn Ford.

In an episode of I Love Lucy titled "Housewarming", which originally aired on April 1, 1957, Ethel Mertz (Vivian Vance) derisively refers to Betty Ramsey (Mary Jane Croft) as "the Elsa Maxwell of Westport".

In The Spy Went Dancing by Aline, Countess of Romanones (1991), Elsa Maxwell is mentioned as being a society hostess who held "fabulous parties" in 1947 New York.

In Season 1, Episode 5 of The Adventures of Ozzie and Harriet, entitled The Halloween Party, Ozzie and his neighbor Thorny decide they are going to take over the planning and organizing of the annual neighborhood Halloween party. As Ozzie tells Harriet about their big plan, he notes: "And a well-planned party is a successful party."; to which Harriet responds: "Thank you, Elsa Maxwell." The episode originally aired on October 31, 1952.

Elsa Maxwell was also referred to by JFK impersonator Vaughn Meader on The First Family LP (1962). On track 15, "Saturday Night, Sunday Morning", Maxwell calls President Kennedy (Meader) to see if he and Jackie (Naomi Brossart) would be interested in going to a party she was hosting that evening. The President, however, politely declines because he is too embarrassed to admit that he and the First Lady have not already made Saturday night plans themselves.

In Season 6 Episode 31 of Leave It to Beaver ("The Poor Loser"), June jokingly refers to herself as "a regular Elsa Maxwell."

In Season 1 Episode 31 of The Beverly Hillbillies ("The Clampetts Entertain") which originally aired on April 24, 1963, the character Martin Van Ransohoff mentions Perle Mesta and Elsa Maxwell.

Elsa Maxwell in Venice in 1925 is depicted in Laurie R. King's novel Island of the Mad.

In Sunset Boulevard (1950), Jack Webb’s character refers to himself as the “Elsa Maxwell of assistant directors.”

Elsa Maxwell is an integral part of the book Diva by Daisy Goodwin, showing her friendship with Maria Callas. St. Martin's Press. January 2024

== Bibliography ==
- RSVP: Elsa Maxwell's Own Story by Elsa Maxwell, Little, Brown and Company (1954)
- I Married the World by Elsa Maxwell, William Heinemann (1955)
- How to Do It, or the Lively Art of Entertaining by Elsa Maxwell, Little, Brown and Company (1957)
- Inventing Elsa Maxwell by Sam Staggs, St. Martin's Press (2012) ISBN 978-0-312-69944-4
