= Walter White (activist) =

American civil rights activist (1893–1955)

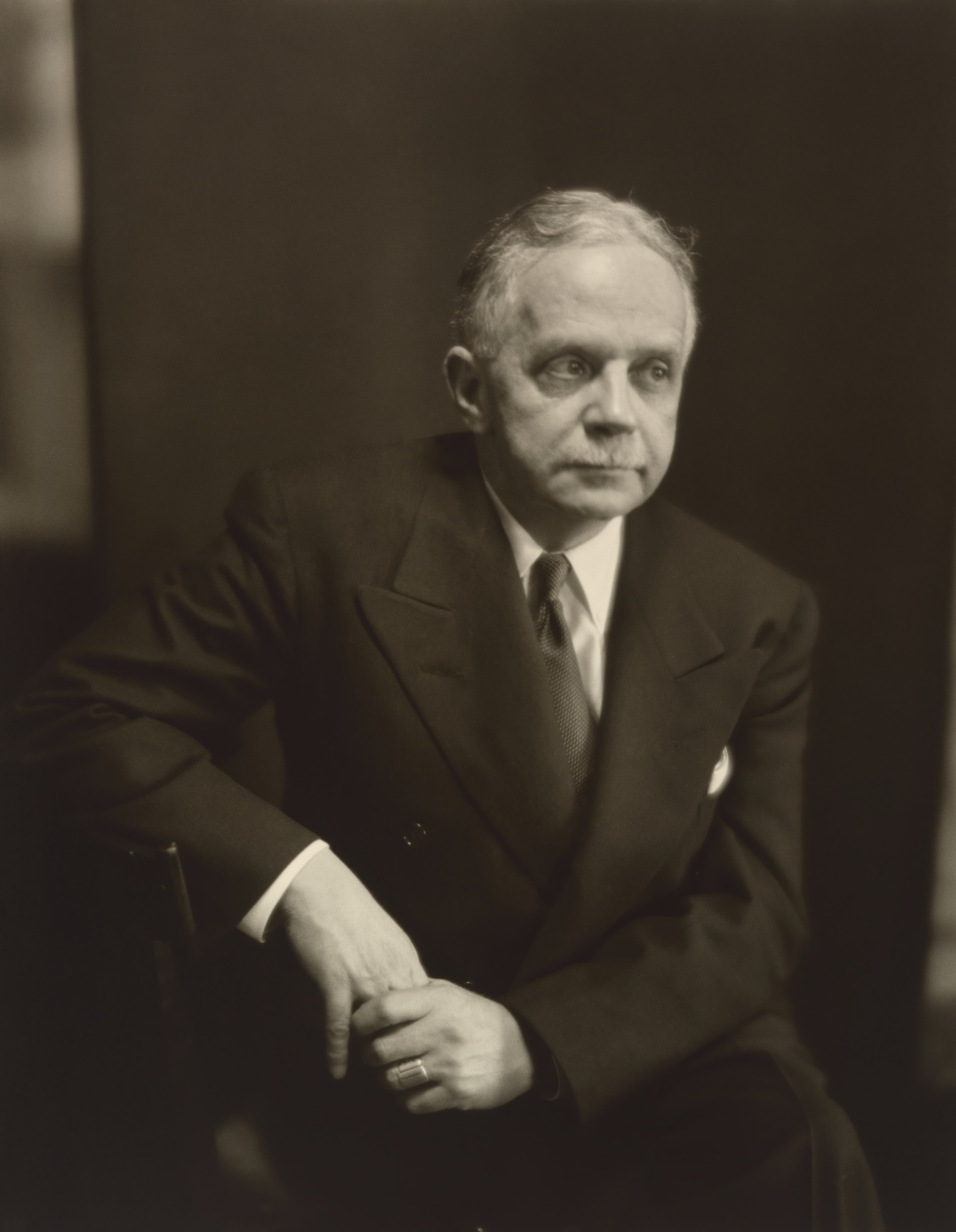
- White c. 1950

Executive Secretary of the NAACP
- In office 1929–1955
- Preceded by: James Weldon Johnson
- Succeeded by: Roy Wilkins

Personal details
- Born: Walter Francis White; July 1, 1893 Atlanta, Georgia, U.S.
- Died: March 21, 1955 (aged 61) New York City, U.S.
- Spouses: Gladys Powell (m. 1922; div. 1949) Poppy Cannon (m. 1949)
- Children: 2, including Jane
- Education: Atlanta University (BA)

Walter Francis White (July 1, 1893 – March 21, 1955) was an American civil rights activist who led the National Association for the Advancement of Colored People (NAACP) for a quarter of a century, from 1929 until 1955. He directed a broad program of legal challenges to racial segregation and disfranchisement. He was also a journalist, novelist, and essayist.

White first joined the NAACP in 1918, at the invitation of James Weldon Johnson, the NAACP's Executive Secretary. As Johnson's assistant he traveled to the South to investigate lynchings and race riots. Being light-skinned, he was able to pass as white to facilitate his investigations and protect himself in tense situations.

White succeeded Johnson as the head of the NAACP in an acting capacity in 1929, taking over officially in 1931, and led the organization until his death in 1955. White led the NAACP in campaigning for a federal law against lynching, to bar employment discrimination in defense industries during World War II, and to end the segregation of the armed forces after the war. Under White's leadership, the NAACP set up its Legal Defense Fund, which conducted numerous legal challenges to segregation and disfranchisement and achieved many successes. Among these was the Supreme Court ruling in Brown v. Board of Education (1954), which determined that segregated education was inherently unequal.

White confronted a number of challenges, both internal and external, to his and the NAACP's strategies for achieving civil rights for African Americans. White also saw NAACP membership quintuple to nearly 500,000 during his leadership.

== Early life ==
=== Family background ===
Walter was the son of George and Madeline White. His father had attended Atlanta University, one of the South's historically black universities, and had become a postal worker, an admired position in the federal government; Walter helped his father complete his rounds by driving the wagon used to carry the mail.

His mother had graduated from the same institution and became a teacher. She had been briefly married in 1879 to Marshall King, who died the same year.

White and his family identified as Negro and lived among Atlanta's Negro community, despite White and his siblings inheriting a bit less than 16 percent African ancestry and being able to pass as white. He emphasized in his autobiography, A Man Called White (p. 3): "I am a Negro. My skin is white, my eyes are blue, my hair is blond. The traits of my race are nowhere visible upon me." Of his 32 great-great-great-grandparents, only five were black, and the other 27 were white. All members of his immediate family had fair skin, and his mother, Madeline, was also blue-eyed and blonde. White learned how to pass for white, a skill he used later to preserve his safety as a civil rights activist in the South.

Marie Harrison was White's grandmother. Born into slavery to a mother named Dilsia, she was fathered by future President William Henry Harrison, who had five other children with Dilsia.

According to the oral history of White's mother's family, when Harrison decided to run for president he concluded that it would not be politically advantageous for him to have "bastard slave children" in his home. He gave four of Dilsia's children, including Marie Harrison, to his brother, who sold them to Joseph Poythress, one of the earliest white settlers of LaGrange, Georgia.

Held in enslavement in LaGrange, Georgia, where she had been sold, Marie became a concubine to Augustus Ware. The wealthy white man bought her a house, had four children with her, and passed on some wealth to them.

The White family belonged to the influential First Congregational Church, founded after the Civil War by freedmen and the American Missionary Association, based in the North. Of all the Black denominations in Georgia, the Congregationalists were among the most socially, politically and financially powerful, making membership in First Congregational the ultimate status symbol in Black Atlanta.

Their social status within the Black community did not, on the other hand, protect White from the realities of living in the Jim Crow South as a young boy: when he was eight, he threw a rock at a white child who called him a derogatory name for drinking from the fountain reserved for black people. When he was thirteen he and his family endured the 1906 Atlanta race massacre in which white mobs attacked Black Atlantans and invaded their homes and businesses, killing more than 25 people over three days. At one point a group of whites bearing torches came to White's neighborhood intending to burn it down, but fled when one of his neighbors fired at them.

This experience cemented White's view of himself. As he described that night years later:

As a boy there in the darkness amid the tightening fright, I knew the inexplicable thing—that my skin was as white as the skin of those who were coming at me. The mob moved toward the lawn. I tried to aim my gun, wondering what it would feel like to kill a man....In that instant there opened up within me a great awareness; I knew then who I was. I was a Negro....

...There were white men who said Negroes had no souls, and who proved it by the Bible. Some of these now were approaching us, intent on burning our house....

After that night I knew I never wanted to be a white man. I knew which side I was on.

=== Education ===
George and Madeline White took a kind but firm approach in rearing their children, encouraging hard work and regular schedules. In his autobiography, White relates that his parents ran a strict schedule on Sundays; they locked him in his room for silent prayer, a time so boring that he almost begged to do homework. His father forbade Walter from reading any books less than 25 years old so he chose to read Dickens, Thackeray, and Trollope by the time he was 12.

Walter attended the Atlanta public schools, graduating from the Atlanta University high school in 1912, and from the university in 1916. This period of study enabled White to spend eight years in the old Atlanta's unusual atmosphere at its zenith. White's life work reflected on the "Old Atlanta University's pioneer and still unequaled contributions in Southern colored institutions of higher learning."

Although W. E. B. Du Bois had already moved to the North before White enrolled at Atlanta University, Du Bois knew White's parents well and had taught two of White's older siblings at Atlanta University. White also benefited from Du Bois' legacy of scholarship and activism at Atlanta University, both as a professor of history and economics and as the organizer of the Atlanta Conference of Negro Problems, an annual conference that focused on issues such as the inequality of supposedly "separate but equal" segregated schools for Black students in the South.

=== Early civil rights activism ===
After graduating in 1916, White took a position with the Standard Life Insurance Company, one of the new and most successful businesses started by black people in Atlanta. He also worked to organize an Atlanta chapter of the NAACP, which had been founded in 1909.

He and other local leaders were successful in getting the Atlanta School Board to support improving education for Black children, who were taught in segregated schools, which were traditionally underfunded by the white-dominated legislature. Black people had been effectively disfranchised at the turn of the century by Georgia's passage of a new constitution making voter registration more difficult, as had all the other former Confederate states.)

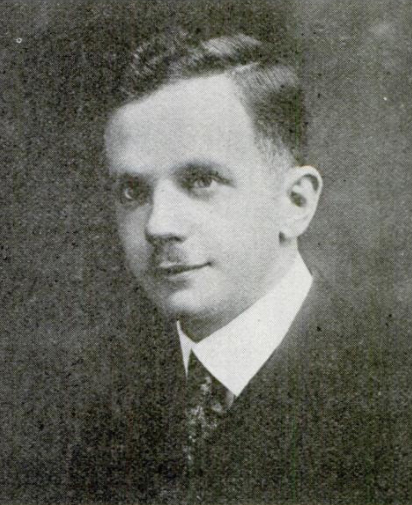
White in 1918

Activist and writer James Weldon Johnson, at that time the NAACP'S field secretary, first encountered White when he appeared as the featured speaker at a mass meeting that White had organized in March 1917 to celebrate their recent victory for Black schoolchildren and to lay the groundwork for an Atlanta chapter of the NAACP. White impressed Johnson with his energy and effectiveness; as Johnson later wrote, "I left Atlanta having made a strong mental note of him."

== Years with the NAACP ==
Several months later Johnson invited White, then 24 years old, to come to work for the NAACP at its national headquarters in New York City. After discussing the offer with his parents, White finally accepted it, arriving in February, 1918.

White replaced Johnson as acting executive director of the NAACP in 1929, then served as executive director from 1931 until his death in 1955.

=== Investigative and journalistic work ===
White began work as Johnson's assistant, corresponding with the NAACP's chapters and other organizational details. His job changed radically, however, within a few weeks.

White became an undercover agent in investigating lynchings in the South, which were at a peak. Within weeks of his arrival in New York, White volunteered to go to Estill Springs, Tennessee, where a Black man accused of rape had recently been tortured and burned and a Black pastor shot to death for allegedly aiding him. Posing as a white traveling salesman, White hung out at the local general store, where local whites provided him with a detailed account of these murders. White's account made news across the country.

White's report on the two murders was reprinted in the NAACP's magazine The Crisis, which was sent out to the local chapters and their members throughout the country. That sparked a wave of responses from the field that led the NAACP to send White on a speaking tour throughout the South, where his name, linked to his report on Estill Springs, attracted large crowds.

White continued his investigative work. Such work was dangerous: "Through 1927 White would investigate 41 lynchings, 8 race riots, and two cases of widespread peonage, risking his life repeatedly in the backwaters of Florida, the piney woods of Georgia, and in the cotton fields of Arkansas." With his keen investigative skills and light complexion, White proved to be the NAACP's secret weapon against white mob violence.

White investigated similar murders in Lowndes and Brooks counties, Georgia later in 1918. White's report, which identified thirteen of the murderers, not only attracted widespread public attention, but prompted President Woodrow Wilson to issue a statement condemning lynchings and asking state and local law enforcement "to make an end of this disgraceful evil." The Governor of Georgia also acknowledged receipt of White's report, but none of the persons named in it were questioned or arrested, much less tried for their crimes.

White went on to investigate the Elaine massacre, in which white vigilantes and Federal troops in Phillips County, Arkansas killed more than 100 Black residents in September and October 1919. Granted press credentials from the Chicago Daily News, White gained an interview with Arkansas Governor Charles Hillman Brough, who gave White a letter of recommendation and his autographed photograph.

According to his own account, White had been in Phillips County for a brief time when he learned there were rumors floating about him. He quickly took the first train back to Little Rock. The conductor told the young man that he was leaving "just when the fun is going to start", because they had found out that there was a "damned yellow nigger passing for white and the boys are going to get him." When White asked what the boys would do to the man, the conductor told White that "when they get through with him he won't pass for white no more!"

After the massacre ended an all-white Arkansas state grand jury returned indictments against 122 Black people, with 73 charged with murder. The trials were held in 1920 in the county courthouse in Elaine, Phillips County. Mobs of armed whites milled around the courthouse and some of the white audience in the courtroom also carried firearms. Twelve of the defendants were sentenced to death, in many cases after trials that lasted less than an hour in which juries took less than ten minutes to find them guilty and sentence them to death. 67 were condemned to sentences from 20 years to life. No white man was prosecuted for any of the many Black deaths.

White published his findings about the massacre and trial in the New York Daily News, the Chicago Defender, and The Nation, as well as the NAACP's own magazine, The Crisis. Governor Brough asked the United States Postal Service to prohibit mailings of the Chicago Defender and The Crisis to Arkansas and others tried to get an injunction against distribution of The Defender at the local level.

White was sent to Orange County a few days after on Election Day on November 2, 1920, to investigate the Ocoee massacre, in which whites murdered more than 30 African American residents and burned down most Black-owned homes and businesses in north Ocoee. Local whites, aided by the KKK, later drove out the remaining Black residents, turning Ocoee into an all-white or "sundown town".

White arrived in Orange County a few days after the massacre to investigate. Posing as a white northerner interested in buying orange grove property he found that the whites there were "still giddy with victory". A local real estate agent and a taxi cab driver told him that about 56 African Americans were killed in the massacre. White's NAACP report recorded around thirty dead.

After the NAACP and others urged the House Committee on the Census to investigate the murders and voter suppression in Florida, White, Johnson, and William Pickens, the NAACP's assistant field secretary, were called to testify. White later met with the United States Department of Justice to ask it to investigate. White volunteered, when an Assistant Attorney General promised White that the department would investigate the KKK if he could provide evidence that it had been involved in the killings and arson, to infiltrate the Klan; the NAACP's board of directors thought that too risky and directed him to drop the proposal.

However, when agents from the Bureau of Investigation (later the FBI) showed up in Orange County a few weeks later, they made it clear they weren't investigating murder, arson or assault but were interested only in election fraud. The leader of the mob later became mayor of Ocoee.

White continued his investigative work throughout the decade. During the Tulsa race massacre in 1921, White was inadvertently deputized. One of his fellow deputies told him he could shoot any black person and the law would be behind him.

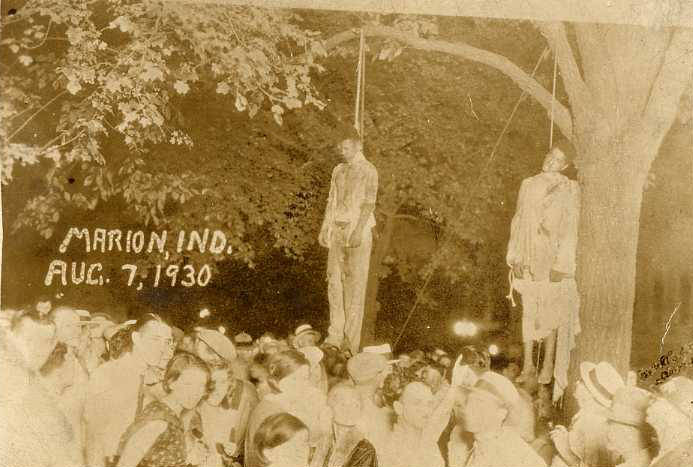
Thomas Shipp and Abram Smith, lynched in Marion on August 7, 1930

At the end of the decade White traveled to Marion, Indiana to investigate the lynching of three Black men, one of whom survived. White's investigation identified a large number of the persons responsible for dragging the three out of jail and then killing them. The local prosecutor refused to charge any members of the lynch mob and instead prosecuted the one man whom the mob had not killed.

White was able by constant appeals to the State, coupled with widespread publication of his report and the now-iconic photograph of the two hanged men, to persuade the Attorney General of the State of Indiana to bring charges. All of the perpetrators were, however, acquitted by all-white juries. White considered it a victory of sorts that the surviving lynching victim was not sentenced to death, but only to a year in prison on lesser charges.

=== Anti-lynching legislation ===
At the same time that White and the NAACP were pursuing justice for individual victims of lynching they also launched a campaign to obtain a federal anti-lynching law to permit the federal government to intervene when local officials refused to prosecute members of lynch mobs. Representative Leonidas C. Dyer introduced the Dyer Anti-Lynching Bill in 1918 in the aftermath of the East St. Louis massacre of the year before; that bill made little progress until after the Tulsa race massacre of 1921. Even then, although the bill passed the House by a wide margin, a prolonged filibuster by Southern Democrats killed it.

The NAACP renewed its campaign in the 1930s with the Costigan–Wagner Bill, sponsored by Senator Edward P. Costigan of Colorado and New York Senator Robert F. Wagner in 1934. Senate leaders tried to persuade President Franklin D. Roosevelt to support the bill, but Roosevelt was concerned about a provision of the bill that called for the punishment of sheriffs who failed to protect their prisoners from lynch mobs would cause him to lose both the support of white voters in the South and the 1936 presidential election. The emerging Southern Caucus in the Senate defeated it.

White was furious with the Roosevelt Administration for its failure to support the bill. He resigned from the Advisory Council for the Government of the Virgin Islands to which Roosevelt had appointed him in 1934, writing Roosevelt:

It is my belief that the utterly shameless filibuster could not have withstood the pressure of public opinion had you spoken out against it. In justice to the cause I serve I cannot continue to remain even a small part of your official family. The Anti-Lynching Bill of 1937, also known as the Gavagan-Wagner Act, was proposed in response to Costigan–Wagner's failure, but was similarly blocked by the Senate after passing the House.

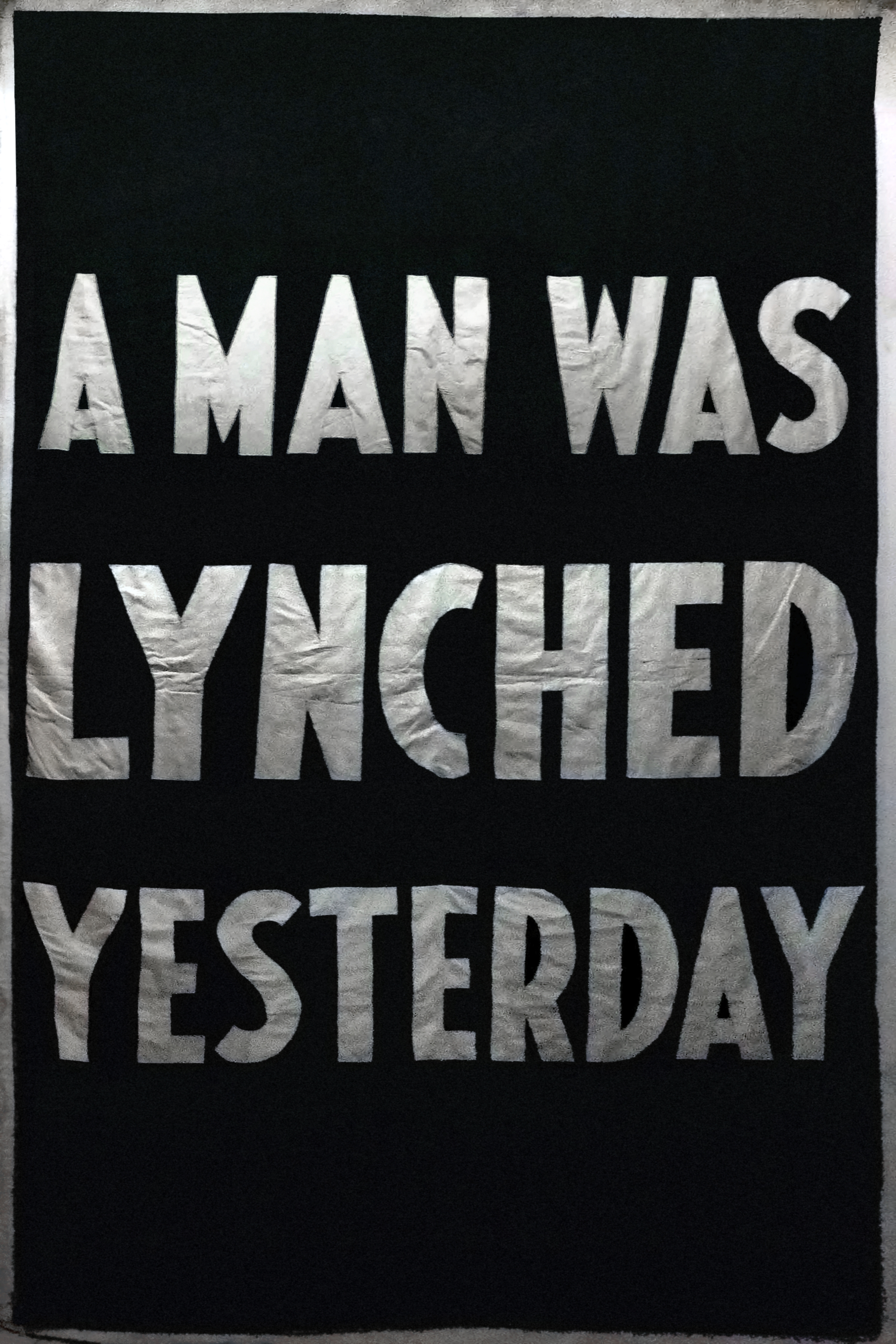
The NAACP flag exhibited by the Library of Congress

The NAACP regularly displayed a black flag stating "A Man Was Lynched Yesterday" from the window of its offices in New York to mark each lynching.

=== Advancing civil rights through the courts ===
The NAACP had been active in fighting racism through the judicial system since its earliest days, when it took part in the challenge to Oklahoma's discriminatory grandfather clause in Guinn v. United States (1915), and sued to invalidate local zoning ordinances that mandated racial segregation in housing in Buchanan v. Warley (1917). In the 1920s the organization began taking on representation of criminal defendants, whether denied due process in cases such as Moore v. Dempsey (1923), a case growing out of the Elaine Massacre, or charged with murder when resisting murderous attacks, as in the Sweet trials in Detroit.

The NAACP devoted even more time and resources to litigation in the 1930s. This was due in large part to the hiring in 1933 of Charles Houston, who embarked on a years-long campaign to overturn the Supreme Court's decision in Plessy v. Ferguson that culminated in Brown v. Board of Education as Special Counsel, followed by Thurgood Marshall, who argued Brown before the Supreme Court. While the NAACP had relied in past years on outside lawyers such as Clarence Darrow and Scipio Africanus Jones to advance its causes in court, the NAACP soon had a team of young lawyers who took on all manner of cases that reshaped the law regarding freedom of speech, privacy, and jury trials, to list a few areas. The NAACP formally incorporated its legal department as the NAACP Legal Defense and Educational Fund in 1940.

=== Opposing the Parker Nomination ===
The NAACP joined forces with the American Federation of Labor (AFL) to oppose Herbert Hoover's 1930 nomination of John J. Parker to serve as an Associate Justice of the United States Supreme Court. The AFL opposed Parker for his authorship of a 1926 Fourth Circuit Court of Appeals decision barring the United Mine Workers from organizing a coal mine's employees based on antitrust law and yellow-dog contracts. The NAACP objected to remarks Parker had made while a candidate for governor in 1920 about the participation of African Americans in the political process:

The participation of the Negro in politics is a source of evil and danger to both races and is not desired by the wise men in either race or by the Republican Party of North Carolina.

White sent Parker a telegram asking him whether he had been quoted correctly, and whether he still held such views; Parker never replied. In response, the NAACP initiated a grassroots campaign against the nomination and White testified before the Judiciary Committee.

On April 21, 1930, the committee voted 10–6 to forward the nomination to the full Senate with an adverse recommendation. Anticipating a close vote, White sent a telegram to Vice President Charles Curtis imploring him, if the vote ended in a tie, to cast his tie-breaking vote against confirmation. On May 7, 1930, the Senate rejected Parker's nomination by a 39–41 roll call vote.

This was the first Supreme Court nomination rejected by the Senate since that of Wheeler Hazard Peckham in 1894. The NAACP followed this victory by actively campaigning against Senators from outside the South who had voted for Parker. This turn toward electoral politics, and the NAACP's alliance with organized labor, represented an early version of what became the New Deal coalition in the years to come.

=== Pushing for the desegregation of the armed forces and defense industries ===
White made himself unpopular with the White House before and during World War II by insistently demanding that the Administration desegregate the armed forces. White and A. Philip Randolph, head of the Brotherhood of Sleeping Car Porters, made no headway when they met in September 1940 with Roosevelt, Secretary of War Henry Stimson, and Secretary of the Navy Frank Knox, who reiterated the Administration's refusal to enlist Black soldiers or sailors.

Randolph and White made more progress in desegregating defense industries by threatening to bring tens of thousands of Black citizens to Washington D.C. for a March on Washington. They canceled the march when Roosevelt issued an Executive Order banning racial discrimination by defense contractors and creating the Fair Employment Practices Commission to enforce that Order.

Randolph and White did not give up on their goal of desegregating the military even though they did not achieve it in the agreement to call off their March on Washington. The NAACP was one of twenty civil rights organizations that issued the "Declaration of Negro Voters," which demanded the racial integration of the armed forces. Truman responded to their pressure by issuing Executive Order 9980, which desegregated federal employment, and Executive Order 9981, which desegregated the military.

=== Competition with Marcus Garvey ===
In 1920 the NAACP faced a serious challenge to its claim to leadership of the Black community: Marcus Garvey and his United Negro Improvement Association, which championed Black pride and advocated a return to Africa. Garvey, a Jamaican immigrant, was a charismatic speaker who offered escape to African Americans who continued to face lynching and a resurgent Ku Klux Klan, as well as the anti-Black violence that broke out in both the North and South during the Red Summer of 1919.

The NAACP rejected Garvey's separatist platform, which James Weldon Johnson summarized as "absolute abdication...and the recognition that this is a white man's country, a place in which the Negro has no place, no right, no chance, no future." W. E. B. Du Bois was especially contemptuous of Garvey; after Edward Young Clarke of the Ku Klux Klan revealed in 1923 that he had held secret discussions with Garvey, used the pages of The Crisis to label Garvey a lunatic and a traitor and to call for him to be locked up or deported. White, for his part, found a silver lining in Garvey's collapse when he was convicted of mail fraud while his shipping company, the Black Star Line, went out of business: looking back at the end of his life White wrote "It made clear that this vision of escape for the Negro from his problems in the United States was pure illusion."

=== Clashes with the Communist Party ===
Both the Communist Party and the NAACP hoped to establish themselves as the foremost representative of the Black community. This competition for power and influence reached its high point in the fight over which organization would represent the defendants, known as "the Scottsboro boys", on trial for rape and facing the death penalty in Scottsboro, Alabama in 1931.

The defendants were nine black teenagers looking for work who were arrested after a fight with a group of white teens as the train they were riding on passed through Scottsboro, Alabama. Two of the white teens were girls dressed as boys. When originally questioned both denied that they had been raped; later, in order to avoid a charge of vagrancy, one of them accused the black teenagers of rape.

The defendants and their case did not, from what information was presented to the NAACP's board of directors, appear at first to be one that the NAACP would take on: some of the defendants had testified that the others had raped the two girls (while insisting that they were innocent), and none of them were the sort of respectable strivers, such as the defendants in the Sweet case, whom the NAACP had defended in the past. White had a low opinion of both the defendants and their families, which he did not conceal from them or others.

While the Chattanooga, Tennessee chapter of the NAACP had retained an attorney to represent some of the defendants, by the time the NAACP had decided to take on their appeals the CPUSA and its legal arm, the International Labor Defense, had taken over their defense. The Communists believed that a Scottsboro victory was a way to solidify their standing in the African American community over the NAACP, which they attacked as slow and timid. Frozen out of the case, White and the NAACP turned instead to attacking the CPUSA, drawing the condemnation of the most influential African American newspapers.

The Communist Party could also be a difficult partner to work with, assuming that it was willing to collaborate at all. The Party had attacked the NAACP during the 1920s as an organization of "middle-class accommodationists" controlled by white philanthropists. During the CPUSA's "Third Period" beginning in 1928 it moved even further away from the NAACP's integrationist program, taking the position that Black farmers in the South were an incipient revolutionary force and that Blacks in the United States were a separate national group who were entitled to self-determination within a swath of counties with a majority-Black population extending from eastern Virginia and the Carolinas through central Georgia, Alabama, the delta regions of Mississippi and Louisiana and the coastal areas of Texas. Although the Communist Party attracted support from a number of prominent African Americans, including W. E. B. Du Bois and William Pickens of the NAACP, it failed to attain the leadership role it sought. As White later wrote: "The shortsightedness of the Communist leaders in the United States (led to their eventual failure); Had they been more intelligent, honest, and truthful there is no way of estimating how deeply they might have penetrated into Negro life and consciousness."

Ultimately, each side's approach to the case reflected the conflicting ideals of the two organizations. In part this represented strategic considerations: White feared that African Americans would find themselves even more isolated and vulnerable if they identified with communism. As White wrote, "Communism meant that blacks have two strikes against them: blacks were aliens in white society where skin color was more important than initiative or intelligence, and blacks would also be Reds which meant a double dose of hatred from white Americans." White believed the NAACP had to keep its distance and independence from the Communist Party for this reason, while at the same using the Communist Party as leverage in dealing with white America, arguing that if the NAACP's more moderate demands were not met the Black community might embrace more radical alternatives.

=== Infighting with W. E. B. DuBois ===
Relations between White and Du Bois had deteriorated over the years since James Weldon Johnson hired White. Du Bois disagreed with White's focus on lobbying and litigation, which conflicted with the intellectual analyses and international perspective that Du Bois brought to The Crisis, which he had edited since its creation. In addition Du Bois treated White as his intellectual inferior and rejected his political outlook.

These differences became critical in 1931, when the NAACP was facing severe fiscal problems as a result of the Great Depression. White proposed layoffs and salary cuts, as well as a review of the finances of The Crisis, which Du Bois had edited since its creation. That proposal triggered a furious response from Du Bois, who accused White of financial mismanagement and misuse of NAACP funds. Once the battle lines were drawn it proved impossible to overcome the split between Du Bois and White, even when plans to eliminate The Crisis were dropped.

Du Bois escalated what had been an internecine fight the following year by publishing an essay entitled "Segregation" in The Crisis in which he called for a system of separatism, in which Blacks and whites would live in the same country, but with separate cultures and destinies—a rejection of the NAACP's efforts to reverse Plessy v. Ferguson and overcome Jim Crow over the past quarter century. When White submitted a statement for the next issue of The Crisis to stress that the NAACP had always opposed segregation in all its forms, Du Bois originally refused to print it and then relented to the extent of running a much shorter version of White's piece.

Du Bois then increased the rancor of the debate even further by responding in the next issue of The Crisis by claiming that the last quarter century of effort by the NAACP has produced nothing of any value and that White was "white", not "colored". White refrained from responding publicly, but tensions remained high until Du Bois resigned his position in the NAACP, to be replaced as editor of The Crisis by Roy Wilkins, a year later.

Du Bois returned to the NAACP in 1944, but was fired in 1948 for endorsing Henry Wallace for president, while criticizing White for positioning the nominally non-partisan NAACP in support of Truman.

=== Youth activism ===
In 1933, White wrote a memo to the NAACP Board of Directors critiquing the organization's lack of direction for its youth branches. He said that it was "one of the greatest weaknesses of the Association's program" and unfortunately discouraged the participation and ideas of promising young people. At the time, the junior branches and college chapters of the organization were understaffed, underfunded, and barely organized. Juanita Jackson, a Baltimore NAACP activist, lobbied hard for the formation of a new youth program, and in 1935, the NAACP Board voted to establish a new youth division, formed in 1936 as the Youth and College Division, and helmed by Jackson. From 1935 to 1938, Jackson also worked as special assistant to White, stating that White had asked her to work with him in New York to develop the organization's youth program. Jackson restructured youth councils and connected their mentorship and oversight with senior branches or the national youth office. The program's guidelines were to prepare future NAACP leaders and activists, educate youth on black history, support campaigns for civil rights or against lynching, and foster interracial cooperation. Youth were frequently used to support political campaigns, protests, and legal tests.

== Literary career ==
Through his cultural interests and his close friendships with white literary power brokers Carl Van Vechten and Alfred A. Knopf, Sr., White was one of the founders of the "New Negro" cultural flowering. Popularly known as the Harlem Renaissance, the period was one of intense literary and artistic production. Harlem became the center of black American intellectual and artistic life. It attracted creative people from across the nation, as did New York City in general.

Writer Zora Neale Hurston accused Walter White of stealing her designed costumes from her play The Great Day. White never returned the costumes to Hurston, who repeatedly asked for them by mail.

After Hattie McDaniel was the first African-American to win an Oscar, the 1939 Academy Award for Best Supporting Actress in Gone with the Wind and beating Olivia de Havilland, White accused her of being an Uncle Tom. McDaniel responded that she would "rather make seven hundred dollars a week playing a maid than seven dollars being one"; she further questioned White's qualification to speak on behalf of blacks, since he was light-skinned and only one-eighth black.

White was the author of two novels, both based on his experience with the murderous conditions for Blacks in the South, published during his lifetime: Fire in the Flint (1924) and Flight (1926). His non-fiction book Rope and Faggot: A Biography of Judge Lynch (1929) was a study of lynching. Additional books were A Rising Wind (1945, which inspired Nevil Shute to write the popular novel The Chequer Board two years later), his autobiography A Man Called White (1948), and How Far the Promised Land (1955). Unfinished at his death was Blackjack, a novel on Harlem life and the career of an African-American boxer.

To become a popular leader, White had to compete with the appeal of Marcus Garvey; he learned to display a skillful verbal dexterity. Roy Wilkins, his successor at the NAACP, said: "White was one of the best talkers I've ever heard."

== Marriage and family ==
White married Gladys Powell in 1922. They had two children, Jane White, who became an actress on Broadway and television; and Walter Carl White, who lived in Germany for much of his adult life. The Whites' 27-year marriage ended in divorce in 1949.

Because White was a public figure of a noted African-American rights organization, he generated great public controversy shortly after his divorce by marrying Poppy Cannon, a divorced white South African woman, who was a magazine editor with connections in the emerging television industry. Many of his black colleagues and acquaintances were offended. Some claimed the leader had always wanted to be white; others said he had always been white.

Gladys and their children broke off with White and his second wife. White's sister said that he had wanted all along simply to pass as a white person. His son changed his name to Carl Darrow, signifying his disgust and desire to separate himself from his father.

== Awards and honors ==
- 1927 – White received the Harmon Award (William E. Harmon Foundation Award for Distinguished Achievement among Negroes) for his book Rope and Faggot: An Interview with Judge Lynch, a study of lynching.
- 1937 – Awarded the Spingarn Medal by the NAACP, for outstanding achievement by an African American.
- 2002 – Molefi Kete Asante listed Walter Francis White on his list of 100 Greatest African Americans.
- 2009 – White was inducted into the Georgia Writers Hall of Fame.

== Death ==
White died of a heart attack in New York City on March 21, 1955, at the age of 61.

== See also ==
- List of civil rights leaders
- List of people from Harlem
