= Elsa Maxwell's Party Line =

American radio talk show (1942–1947)

Elsa Maxwell's Party Line is an American radio talk show. It was broadcast on the Blue Network from January 2, 1942, to June 26, 1942, and then was carried on Mutual from 1943 to 1947.

== Blue Network version ==
Elsa Maxwell, "reputed to be the world's best party giver", was the host of the program, which featured her telling stories about celebrities whom she knew, such as Lord Beaverbrook of England on the February 27, 1942, episode. Guests on the program included Darryl Zanuck. Another feature was answering questions from listeners' letters. She answered about a dozen letters each week from the nearly 1,000 that usually arrived. Maxwell said that she was surprised when she was contacted about hosting the program. She said, "I know nothing about radio.".

One ongoing segment during the broadcasts focused on Maxwell's efforts to lose weight from her 190 pounds when the series began, Once a week, she weighed on the air, providing regular reports of her progress, after describing herself at the beginning of the series as "Just a human potato sack with a belt around my middle". Graham McNamee was the announcer. The show was initially broadcast from 10 to 10:15 p.m. Eastern Time on Fridays. Effective May 1, 1942, it was moved to 9:45 to 10 p.m. E. T. The sponsor was Ralston Purina Company, promoting Ry-Krisp.

== Mutual version ==
After Ralston Purina ended the series on the Blue Network, it was revived as a 15-minute weekday series on Mutual from 1943 to 1947. Maxwell broadcast from her apartment with Marvin Best as announcer and Lony LaFrano as producer. An item in the August 1946 issue of Tune In magazine described the program as having "limited appeal, but more exciting than many daytime shows."
