= Paulette (given name) =

- Pronunciation: po-LET
- Gender: Female

Origin
- Origin: Roman
- Meaning: "small" or "humble"

Other names
- Related names: Pauline, Paulina, Paul

Paulette (po-LET) is the French feminine given name diminutive of the French/English/German given name Pauline, a derivative of the Latin Paulina, from the Roman family name Paulus, meaning "small" or "humble". The masculine given name Paul comes from the same cognate. It is uncommon as a surname. People with the name "Paulette" include:

- Madame Paulette (1900–1984) - French headwear designer
- Paulette Marcelline Adjovi (born 1955), Beninese politician
- Paulette Bethel - a Bahamian ambassador
- Paulette Bourgeois (born 1951) - Canadian children's author
- Paulette Carlson (born 1952) - American singer-songwriter
- Paulette Cooper (born 1942) - an American author
- Paulette Cruz (born 1989) - a Mexican beach volleyball player
- Paulette Doan - a Canadian ice dancer
- Paulette Dubost (1910–2011) - a French stage and film actress
- Paulette Duval (1889–1951) - an Argentine-born French/American actress
- Paulette Fink (1911–2005) was a French-Jewish nurse and resistance worker
- Paulette Frankl (born 1937) - an American courtroom artist and author
- Paulette Gebara Farah (2005–2010) - a Mexican girl whose death was controversial
- Paulette Goddard (1910–1990) - an American film actress
- Paulette Hamilton (born 1962 or 1963), British politician
- Paulette Irons (born 1952) - an American politician
- Paulette Jiles (1943–2025) - an American-born Canadian poet and novelist
- Paulette Libermann (1919-2007) - French mathematician, the Libermann foliation in symplectic geometry is named after her.
- Paulette McDonagh (1901–1978) - an Australian film director
- Paulette Moreno (born 1969), former professional tennis player from Hong Kong
- Paulette Noizeux (1887–1971) - a French film and stage actress
- Paulette Phillips - a Canadian artist
- Paulette Rakestraw (born 1967), American politician from the state of Georgia
- Paulette Randall (born 1961) - an English theatre director
- Paulette Reck (born 1968) - an American beauty pageant contestant
- Paulette Schwartzmann (1894–1953) - a Latvian–born French/Argentine chess player
- Paulette Van Roekens (1895–1988) - a French-born American artist
- Paulette Wilson (1956–2020) - a British immigration activist
- Paulette Zang Milama (born 1987) - a Gabonese track and field sprint athlete
