= The Potters (artists group) =

Women's art group in Missouri, US

- Formation: 1904; 122 years ago
- Founded at: St. Louis, Missouri, United States
- Dissolved: 1907; 119 years ago
- Type: Artists group
- Leader: Williamina Parrish
- Mentor: Lillie Rose Ernst

The Potters was an informal group of American female artists in St. Louis, Missouri, who printed their original art, poetry and prose in The Potter's Wheel, a monthly artistic and literary magazine produced from November 1904 to October 1907. The group was mentored by Lillie Rose Ernst, assistant superintendent of education in the St. Louis public school system. Several members of the group went on to have successful careers in the arts, notably Sara Teasdale, Caroline Risque, and the Parrish Sisters.

== Name ==
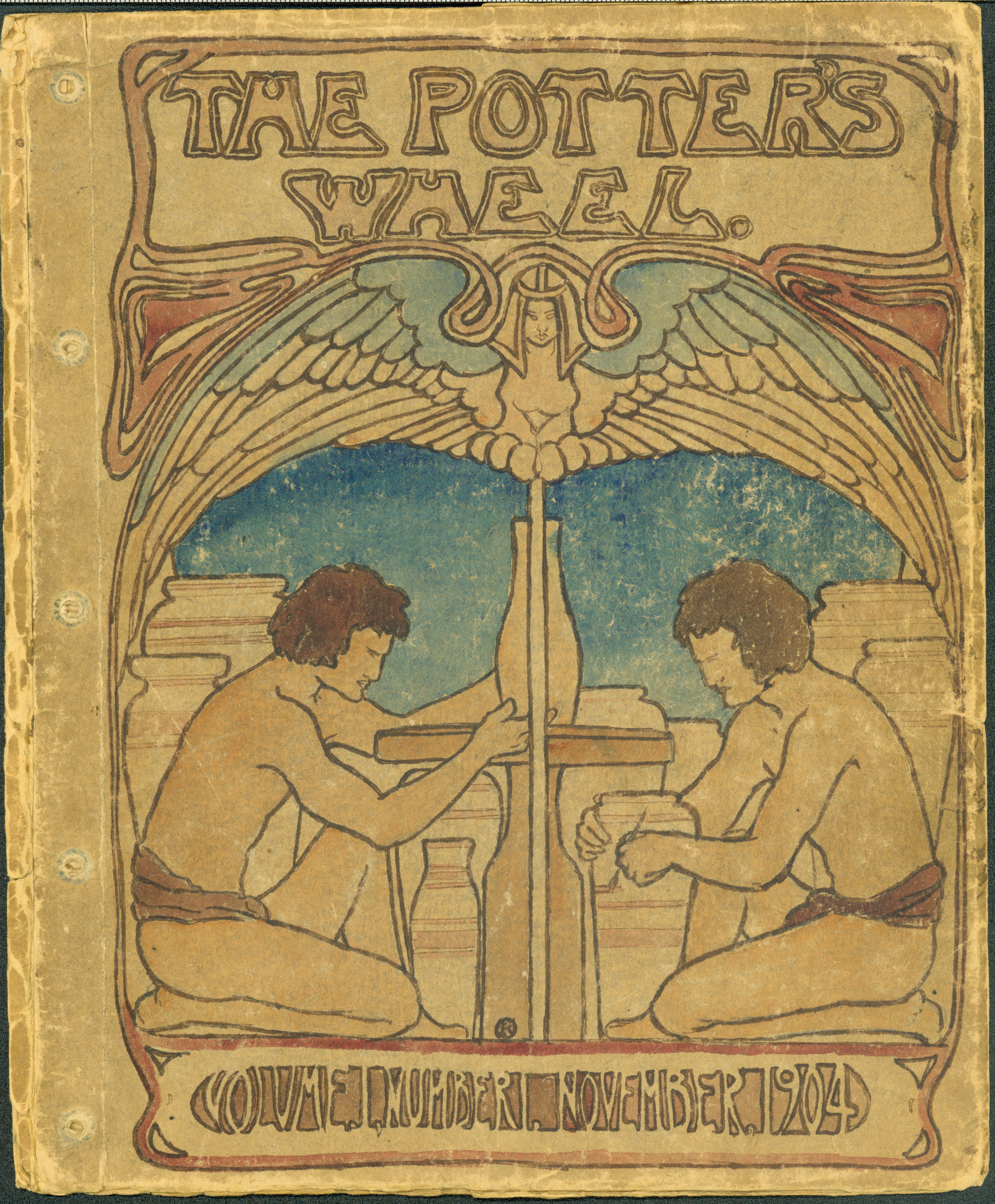
Inaugural cover of The Potter's Wheel, November 1904

The name The Potter's Wheel was inspired by Caroline Risque's cover art for the inaugural edition in November 1904, which depicted a pair of potters sitting opposite one another. Williamina Parrish, who acted as editor-in-chief of the magazine, preferred to call the group the "Self and Mutual Admiration Society".

== Members ==
The members of the group were in their teens and early twenties. They included:

- Grace Parrish (1882–1954) and Williamina Parrish (1880–1940), respected photographers who worked together as the Parrish Sisters. Williamina "Will" Parrish was considered the leader of The Potters. Grace Parrish, Will's younger sister, was a very successful photographer. She was also a model and a violinist.
- Sara Teasdale (1884–1933), lyric poet. Will Parrish played a major role in Sara Teasdale's life, helping her organize the poems for her first collection. They met in 1903 and Teasdale was among the initial members of The Potters.
- Guida Richey (b. 1881) writer, lived one block down the street from the Parrish Sisters. Grace and Guida remained close friends and often travelled together.
- Caroline Risque (1883–1952) American painter and sculptor.
- Petronelle Sombart (1897–1949) (artist), possessed a lyric soprano voice, and studied for grand opera in Milan
- Vine Colby (1886-1971) (writer), engaged in a career of sociological and economy study
- Inez Dutro (writer)
- Celia Harris (writer), became a member of the faculty of Mary Institute until ill health compelled her retirement
- Edna Wahlert (writer), married McCourt, published a "completion" of Coleridge's fragment, "Christabel"

== Mentor ==
St. Louis educator Lillie Rose Ernst was the mentor of The Potters. The group described themselves as "idolatrous females worshipping a yellow-haired Amazon"; they called Ernst a "blond brute...the star of our existence". Some members of the group, including Ernst, are suspected to have been bisexual or lesbian. Several of the artists had known Ernst when they were students at Central High School, where Ernst taught botany.

Teasdale dedicated a sonnet to Ernst which begins:

To L.R.E.
When I first saw you – felt you take my hand
I could not speak for happiness.

== Magazine ==
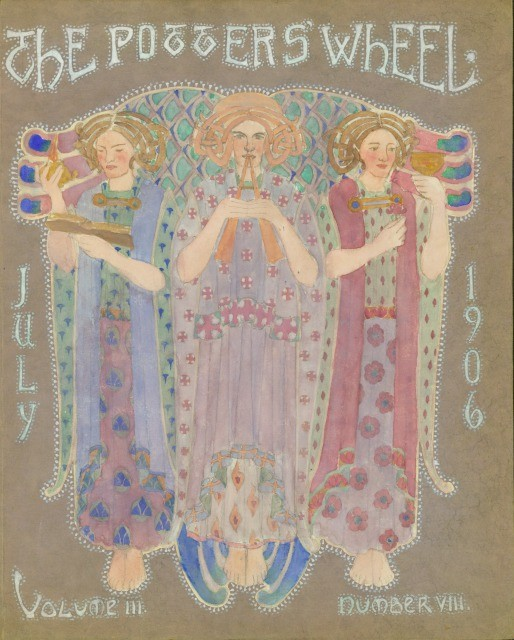
July 1906 cover art by Caroline Risque; this issue includes an address by Lillie Rose Ernst

The group produced The Potters Wheel magazine monthly from November 1904 to October 1907. Only one copy of each magazine was produced each month, "hand-lettered and hand-illustrated" by The Potters themselves. Contents included poetry, fiction, photographs, and needlework. The thick, textured pages of the hand-bound magazine were decorated with "border designs, illuminations, and watercolors". The cover art often sported "mythological or fantastical scenes, in tones resembling stained glass".

The group circulated each issue among their peers with the expectation of receiving constructive criticism. These critiques were printed in booklets which later became part of The Potters Wheel Collection at the Missouri History Museum.

The magazine attracted the attention of St. Louis newspaperman William Marion Reedy, who commissioned an article about it for his Reedy's Mirror in 1905.

The Potters disbanded in late 1907 and "drew lots" to decide who would keep the magazines they had produced. Teasdale received three issues, which were eventually stored at Yale University. The Missouri History Museum was the beneficiary of 16 issues, in addition to the 12 booklets of critiques.

== Legacy ==
Many members of The Potters are buried at Bellefontaine Cemetery, located in St. Louis.

Another woman related to The Potters was Zoe Akins (1886–1958). She was not officially part of The Potters, as she was too young to join the group. However, she was friends with several of the members, and became companion to Teasdale after the group disbanded. A woman related to Akins is Thekla M. Bernays (1856–1931, buried in Block 16, Lot 2358 of Bellefontaine Cemetery).

== Gallery ==
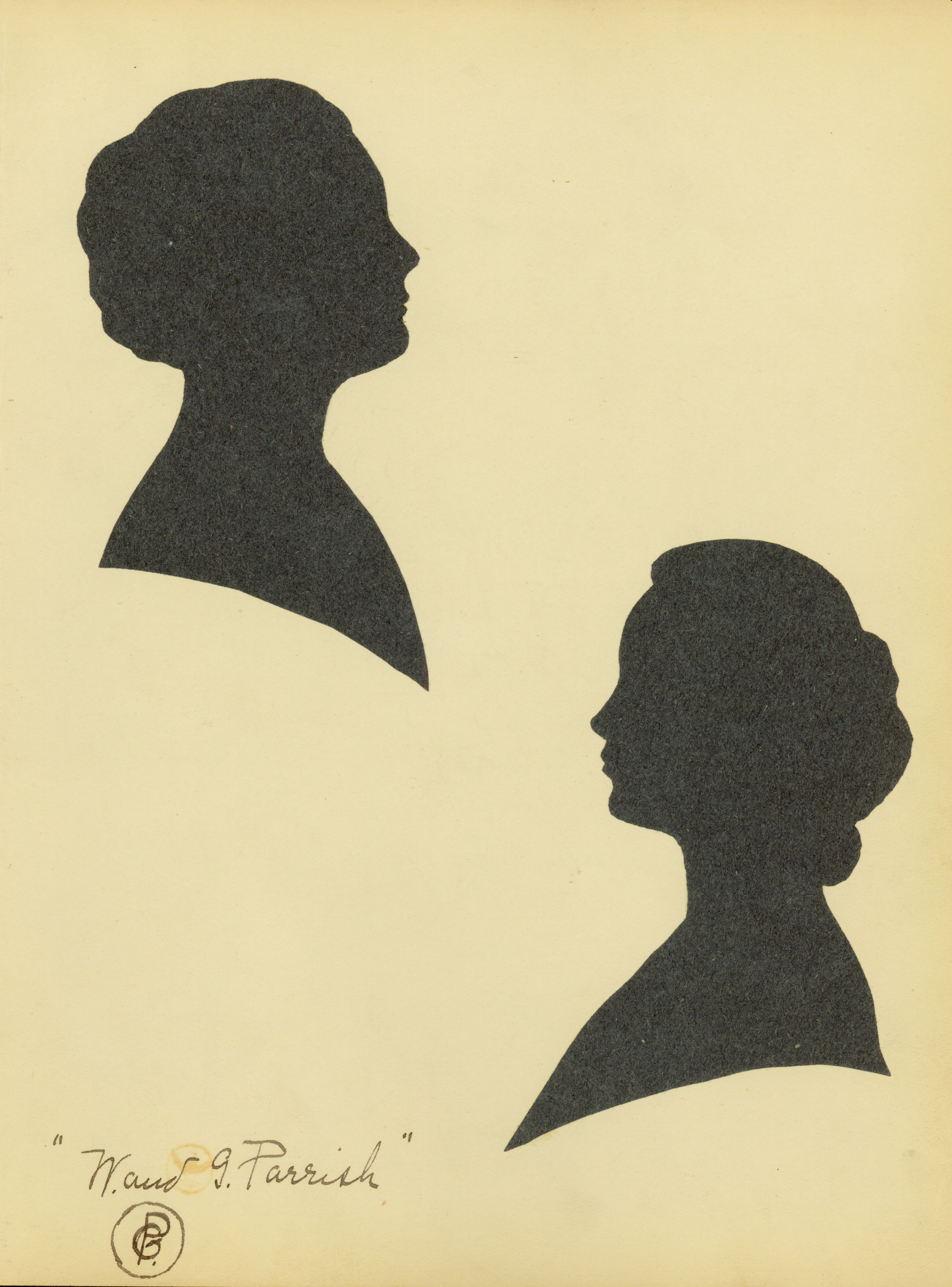
Silhouette portraits of Williamina and Grace Parrish by Grace Parrish, The Potter's Wheel, Volume 1, Number 5, page 53, March 1905

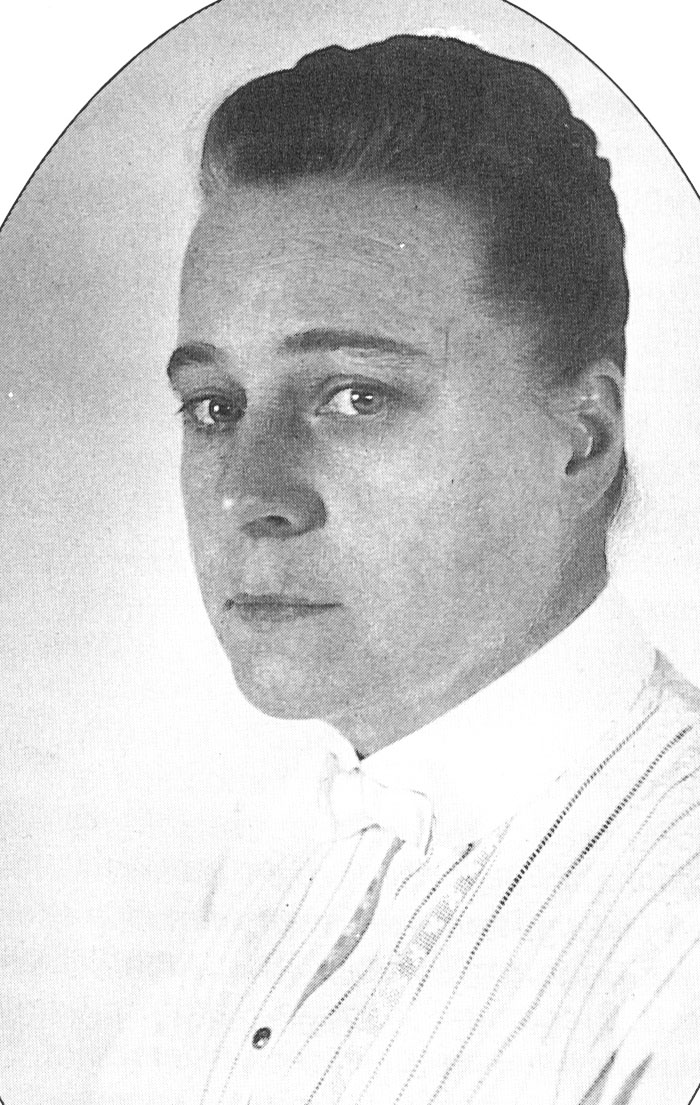
Lillie Rose Ernst. Photograph by the Parrish Sisters, ca. 1910

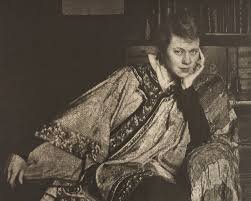
Guida Richey. Photograph by the Parrish Sisters, ca. 1914

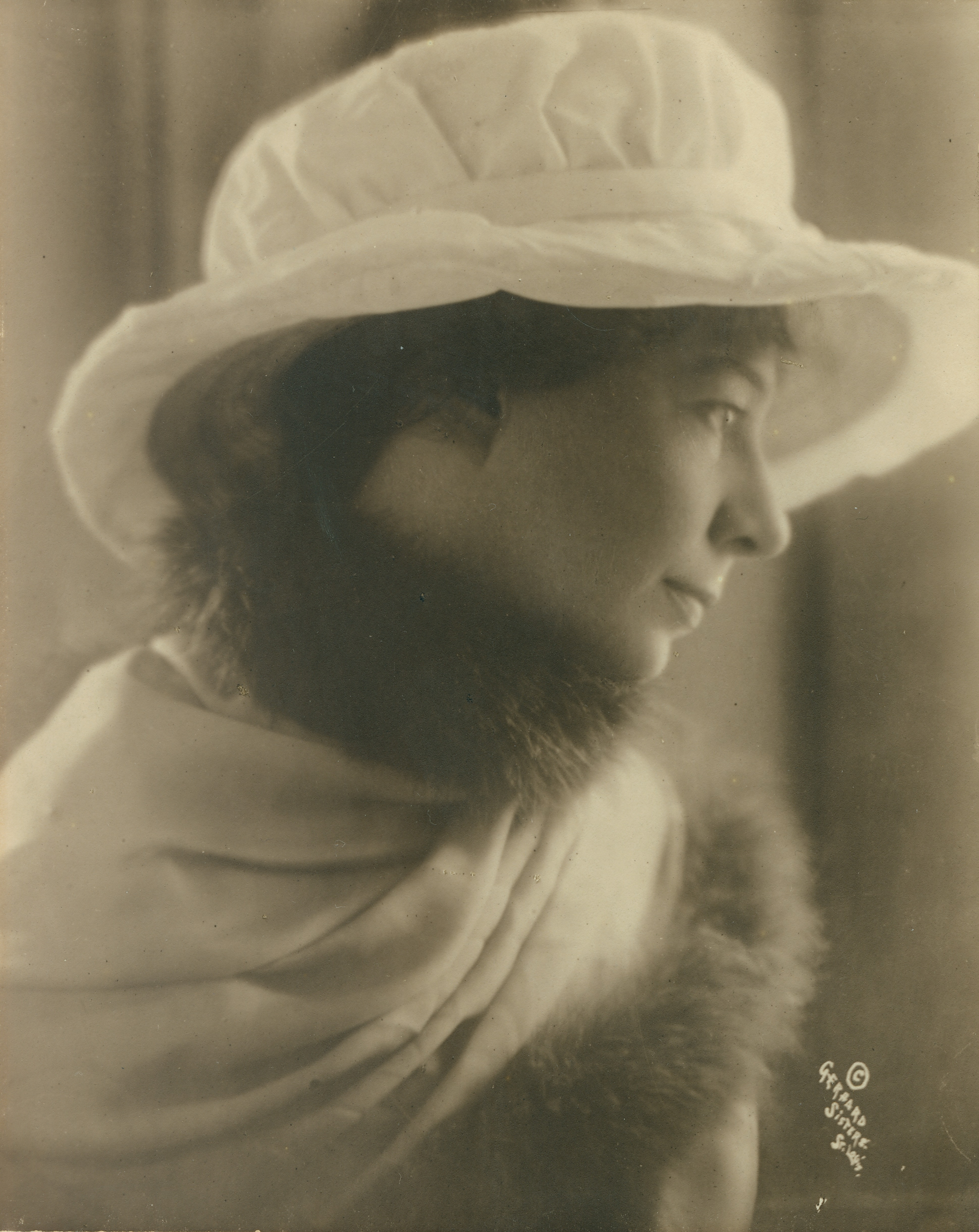
Sara Teasdale. Photograph by the Gerhard Sisters, ca. 1910

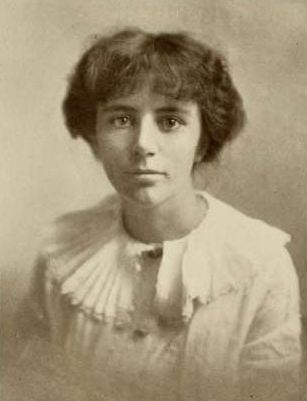
Caroline Risque. Photograph by Gerhard Sisters, ca. 1914

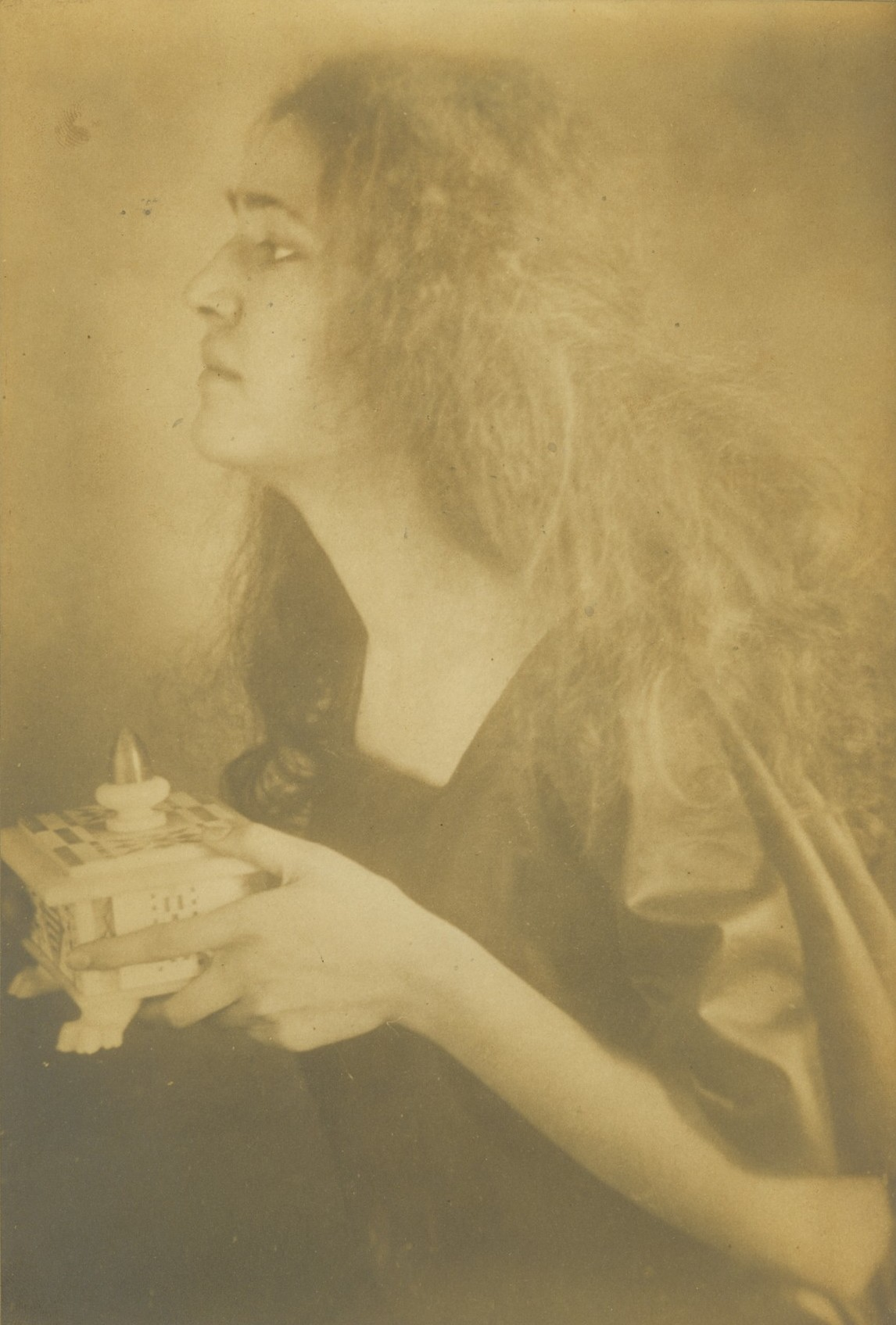
Petronelle Sombart. Photograph by the Parrish Sisters, ca. 1906

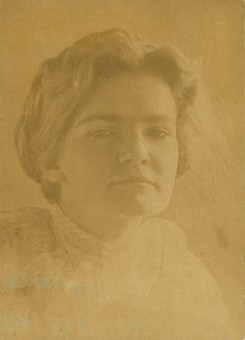
Celia Harris. Photograph by the Parrish Sisters, ca. 1905

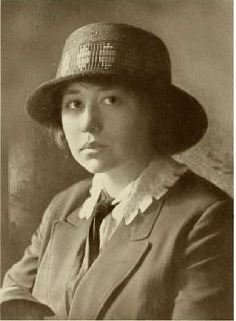
Zoe Akins, ca. 1914

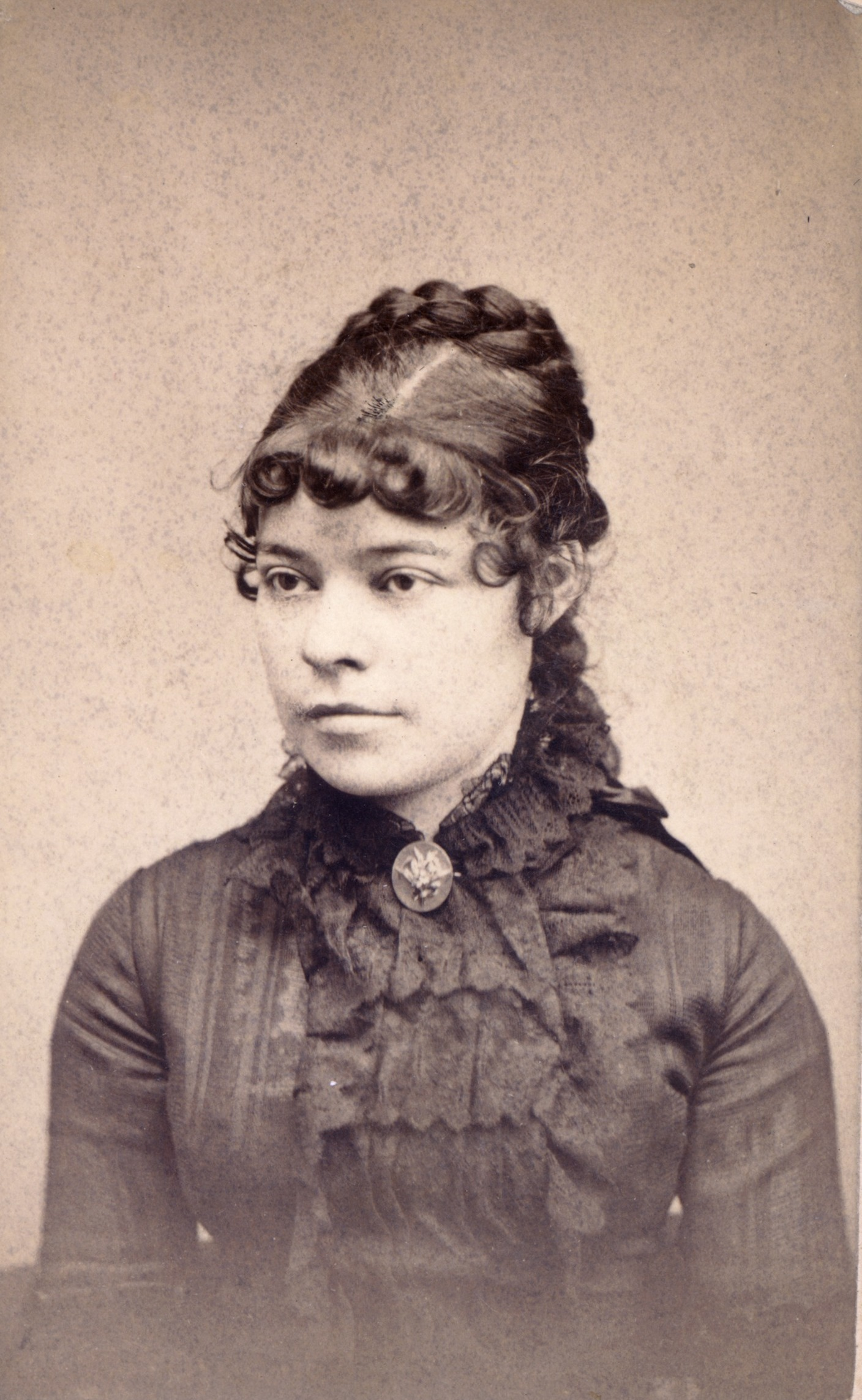
Thekla Bernays

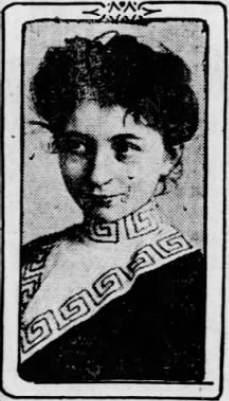
Vine Colby

== Sources ==
- Brawley, Steven Louis; St. Louis LGBT History Project (2016). Gay and Lesbian St. Louis. Arcadia Publishing. ISBN 978-1467115926.
- Corbett, Katharine T. (1999). In Her Place: A Guide to St. Louis Women's History. Missouri History Museum. ISBN 1883982308.
- Drake, William (1989). Sara Teasdale: Woman and Poet. University of Tennessee Press. ISBN 087049595X.
- Johnson, Anne (1914). Notable Women of St. Louis, 1914. St. Louis, Woodward.
- Kreizenbeck, Alan (2004). Zoe Akins: Broadway Playwright. Greenwood Publishing Group. ISBN 0313298157.
- Putzel, Max (1998). The Man in the Mirror: William Marion Reedy and His Magazine. University of Missouri Press. ISBN 082621178X.
- Runco, Mark A. (2011). Encyclopedia of Creativity (2nd ed.). Academic Press. ISBN 978-0123750389.
- Sandweiss, Lee Ann (2000). Seeking St. Louis: Voices from a River City, 1670-2000. Missouri History Museum. ISBN 1883982111.
- Shea, Daniel B. (2012). The Patience of Pearl: Spiritualism and Authorship in the Writings of Pearl Curran. University of Missouri Press. ISBN 978-0826272973.
