= Spoon River Anthology =

1916 poetry collection by Edgar Lee Masters

- Macmillan & Co., First edition, frontispiece to Spoon River Anthology
- Author: Edgar Lee Masters
- Language: English
- Genre: Poetry
- Publisher: William Marion Reedy (1914 & 1915), Macmillan & Co. (1915 & 1916)
- Publication date: April 1915
- Publication place: United States

Spoon River Anthology is a 1915 collection of short free verse poems by Edgar Lee Masters. The poems collectively narrate the epitaphs of the residents of Spoon River, a fictional small town named after the Spoon River, which ran near Masters's home town of Lewistown, Illinois. The aim of the poems is to demystify rural and small town American life. The collection includes 212 separate characters, in all providing 244 accounts of their lives, losses, and manners of death. Many of the poems contain cross-references that create a candid tapestry of the community. The poems originally were published in 1914 in the St. Louis, Missouri, literary journal Reedy's Mirror, under the pseudonym Webster Ford.

== Content ==
The first poem serves as an introduction:

"The Hill"
Where are Elmer, Herman, Bert, Tom and Charley,
The weak of will, the strong of arm, the clown, the boozer, the fighter?
All, all are sleeping on the hill.
One passed in a fever,
One was burned in a mine,
One was killed in a brawl,
One died in a jail,
One fell from a bridge toiling for children and wife—
All, all are sleeping, sleeping, sleeping on the hill.
Where are Ella, Kate, Mag, Lizzie and Edith,
The tender heart, the simple soul, the loud, the proud, the happy one?—
All, all are sleeping on the hill.
One died in shameful child-birth,
One of a thwarted love,
One at the hands of a brute in a brothel,
One of a broken pride, in the search for heart's desire;
One after life in far-away London and Paris
Was brought to her little space by Ella and Kate and Mag—
All, all are sleeping, sleeping, sleeping on the hill.
Where are Uncle Isaac and Aunt Emily,
And old Towny Kincaid and Sevigne Houghton,
And Major Walker who had talked
With venerable men of the revolution?—
All, all are sleeping on the hill.
They brought them dead sons from the war,
And daughters whom life had crushed,
And their children fatherless, crying—
All, all are sleeping, sleeping, sleeping on the hill.
Where is Old Fiddler Jones
Who played with life all his ninety years,
Braving the sleet with bared breast,
Drinking, rioting, thinking neither of wife nor kin,
Nor gold, nor love, nor heaven?
Lo! he babbles of the fish-frys of long ago,
Of the horse-races of long ago at Clary's Grove,
Of what Abe Lincoln said
One time at Springfield.

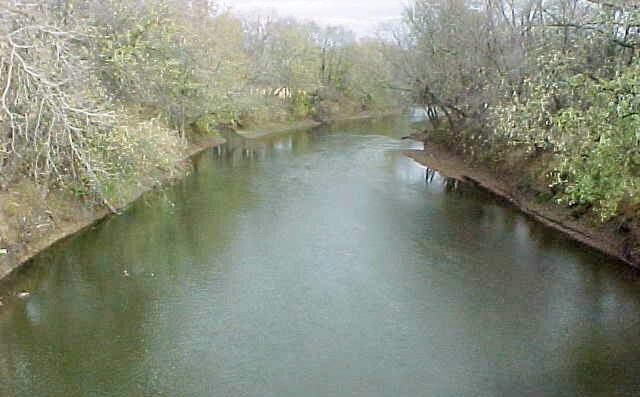
The Spoon River at the community of Seville in Fulton County, Illinois

Each of the following poems is an autobiographical epitaph of a dead citizen, delivered by the dead themselves. Characters include Tom Merritt, Amos Sibley, Carl Hamblin, Fiddler Jones and A.D. Blood. They speak about the sorts of things one might expect: Some recite their histories and turning points, others make observations of life from the outside, and petty ones complain of the treatment of their graves, while few tell how they really died. The subject of afterlife receives only the occasional brief mention, and even those seem to be contradictory. Speaking without reason to lie or fear the consequences, they construct a picture of life in their town that is shorn of façades. The interplay of various villagers—such as a bright and successful man crediting his parents for all he's accomplished, and an old woman weeping because he is secretly her illegitimate child—forms a gripping, if not pretty, whole.

== Composition and publication history ==
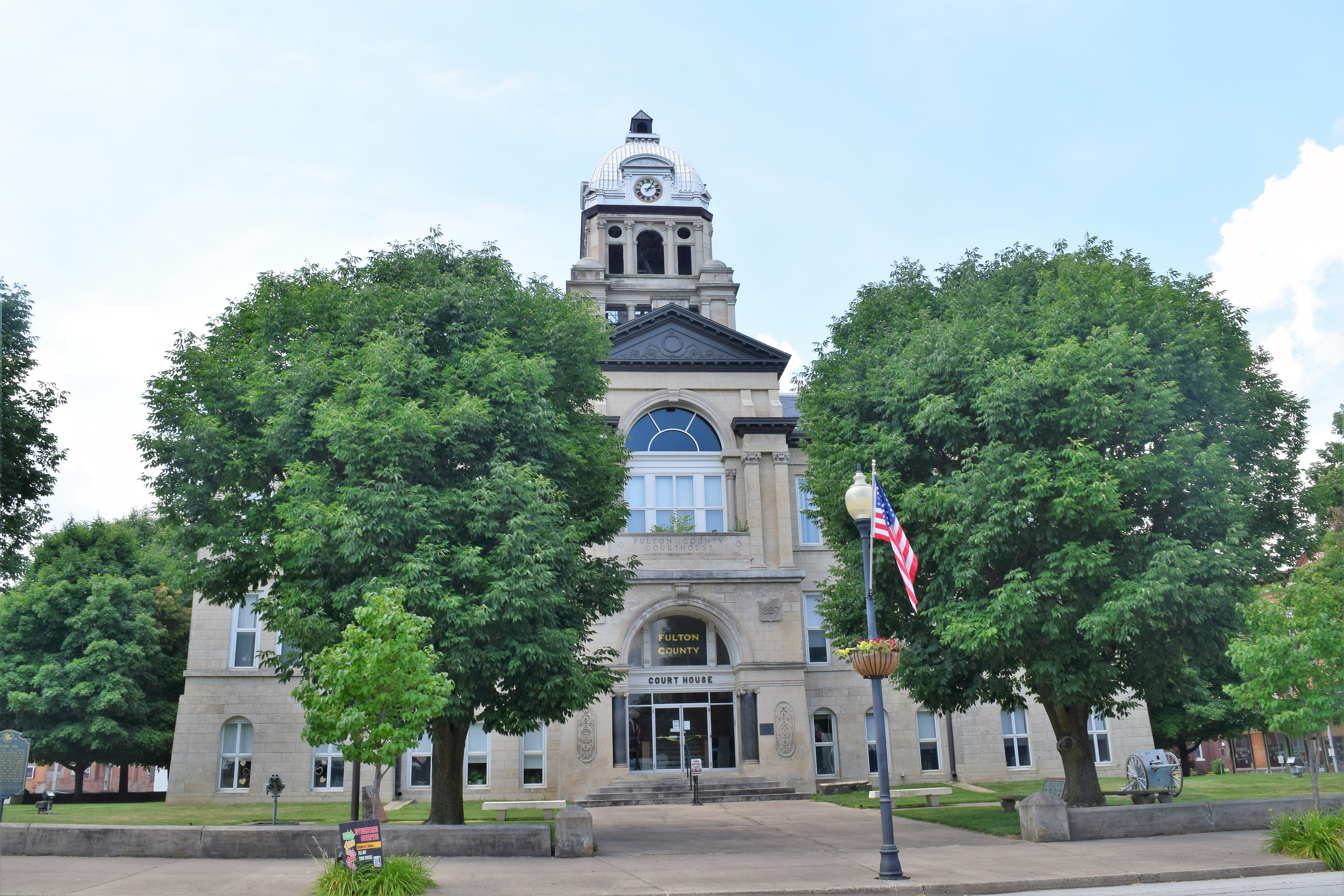
The Fulton County courthouse in Lewistown, Illinois, the county seat of Fulton County, Illinois, is mentioned in the anthology (see poems Silas Dement, Granville Calhoun, and Henry C. Calhoun as examples).

Many of the characters who make appearances in Spoon River Anthology were based on people that Masters knew or heard of in the two towns in which he grew up: Petersburg and Lewistown, Illinois. Masters sometimes substantially disguised the names of these real-life inspirations, but he sometimes disguised them only barely and, in a few cases, not at all. Most notable is Ann Rutledge, regarded in local legend to be Abraham Lincoln's early love interest (though there is no actual proof of such a relationship); Masters heard this legend from his grandfather. Rutledge's grave can be found in a Petersburg cemetery, and a tour of graveyards in both towns, especially Oak Hill Cemetery in Lewistown, reveals most of the surnames that Masters applied to his characters.

After growing up and leaving Lewistown for Chicago, Masters met and befriended William Marion Reedy, the owner, publisher and editor of the St. Louis-based literary magazine Reedy's Mirror. By the time Masters wrote the poems that became Spoon River Anthology, he had published some poetry with some success; these prior poems, however, were more conventional in style and subject matter. Masters later wrote that it was Reedy, through his criticism and friendship, who encouraged him to write "something more distinctive than what I was doing, somehow, someway, but without telling me how to do it." Masters in particular credited Reedy with introducing him to the Greek Anthology, a collection of classical period epigrams, to which Spoon River Anthology is stylistically similar.

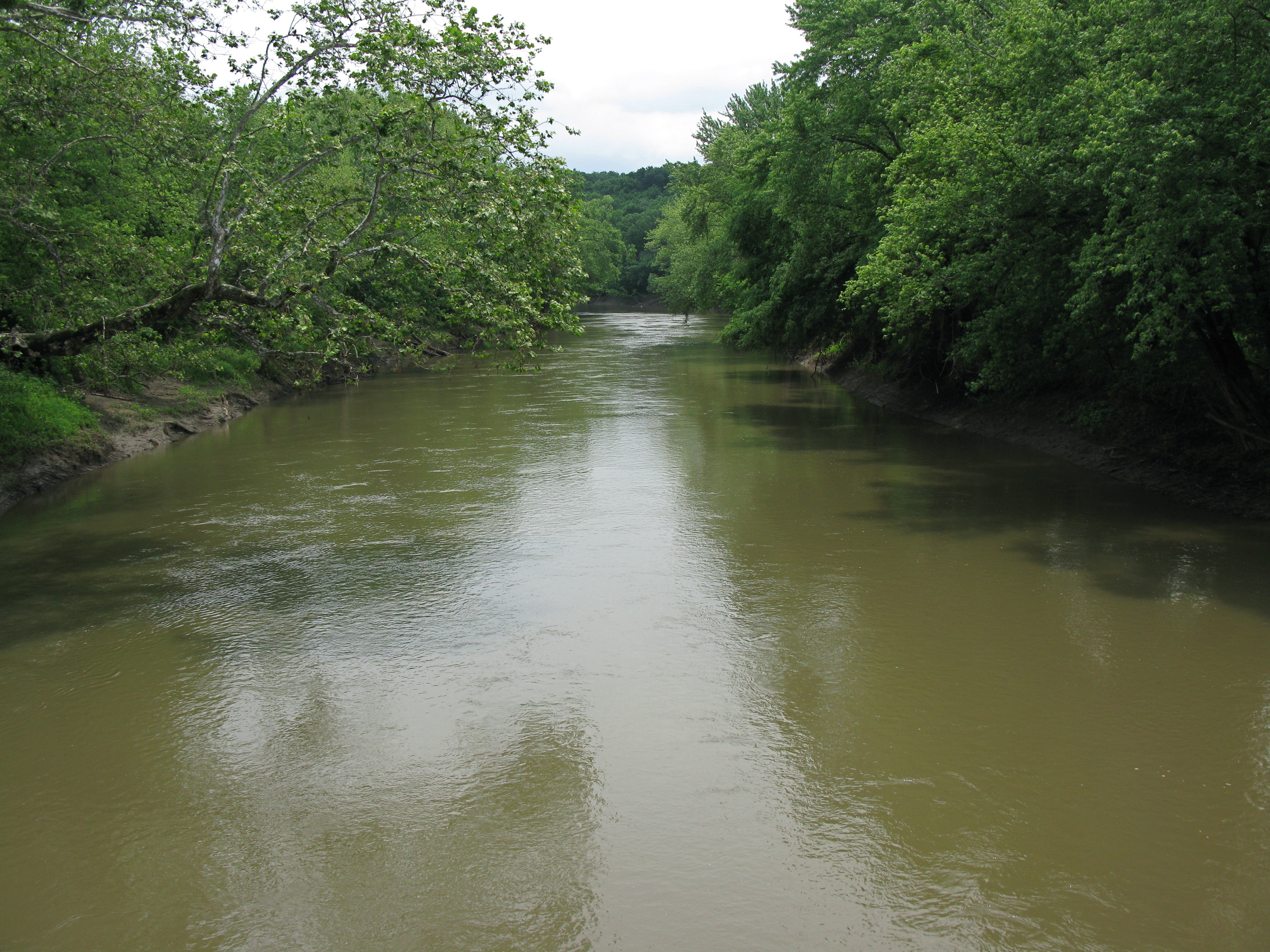
The swollen Spoon River in Lee Township, Fulton County, Illinois in 2009

Spoon River Anthology originally was published in serial form in Reedy's Mirror from May 29, 1914, until January 5, 1915. The poems were attributed initially to the pseudonym Webster Ford. William Marion Reedy, owner, publisher and editor of the magazine revealed the poems' true authorship in November 1914, after 21 weekly entries.

The first bound edition of Spoon River Anthology was published by The Macmillan Company in 1915 with a total of 213 poems. Masters added 33 new poems in the 1916 edition, expanding on new characters with connections to some of the originals. Among these new additions were "Andy the Night-Watch", "Isa Nutter," "Plymouth Rock Joe" and "The Epilogue."

== Critical reception and legacy ==
Spoon River Anthology was a critical and commercial success. Ezra Pound's review of the Spoon River poems begins: "At last! At last America has discovered a poet." Carl Sandburg's review is similarly glowing: "Once in a while a man comes along who writes a book that has his own heart-beats in it. The people whose faces look out from the pages of the book are the people of life itself, each trait of them as plain or as mysterious as in the old home valley where the writer came from. Such a writer and book are realized here." The book sold 80,000 copies over four years, making it an international bestseller by the standards of the day.

Meanwhile, those who lived in the Spoon River region objected to their portrayal in the anthology, particularly as so many of the poems' characters were based on real people. The book was banned from Lewistown schools and libraries until 1974. Even Masters's mother, who sat on the Lewistown library board, voted for the ban. (Masters claimed "My mother disliked [the anthology]; my father adored it".) Despite this, the anthology remained widely read in Lewistown; local historian Kelvin Sampson notes that "Every family in Lewistown probably had a sheet of paper or a notebook hidden away with their copy of the Anthology, saying who was who in town".

Masters capitalized on the success of Spoon River Anthology with the 1924 sequel The New Spoon River, in which Spoon River became a suburb of Chicago and its inhabitants have been urbanized. The second work was less successful and received poorer reviews. In 1933, Masters wrote a retrospective essay on the composition of Spoon River Anthology and the response it received, entitled "The Genesis of Spoon River". He recounts, among other things, the "exhaustion of body" that befell him while writing, which eventually manifested in pneumonia and a year-long bout of illness as the work was being prepared for publication. He claims that the Lewistown residents who strove to identify the poems' characters with real people did so only "with poor success".

More recently, Lewistown celebrated its relationship to Masters's poetry. The Oak Hill Cemetery features a memorial statue of Masters and offers a self-guided walking tour of the graves that inspired the poems. In 2015, the town celebrated the 100th anniversary of the anthology's publication with tours, exhibitions, and theatrical performances.

Today Spoon River Anthology often is assigned in high school and college literature classes and as a source of monologues for theatrical auditions. It is also often used in second-year characterization work in the Meisner technique of actor training.

Spoon River Anthology is credited as an initial inspiration for the "audio log" storytelling device in video games as it first appeared in the game System Shock, a narrative technique that became a standard trope of narrative games.

== Adaptations ==
- Andy Kaufman performed a rendition of Spoon River Anthology in 1969 when he attended Grahm Junior College. His dialogue contained references to cancer, which would ultimately be deemed his cause of death fifteen years later.
- Percy Grainger wrote three arrangements (for piano, two pianos and orchestra) of a fiddle tune called "Spoon River", inspired by the Anthology and dedicated to Masters.
- In 1943, the book was published in Italy (translated by Fernanda Pivano). This version was issued on LP by the Italian Cetra label in 1959, the readers being Paolo Carlini, Arnoldo Foa, Vera Gherarducci and Elsa Merlini.
- In 1951, La Scala premiered Mario Pergallo's La Collina (The Hill), which set several of Masters' poems in operatic form.
- In 1952, Swedish composer Laci Boldemann set four poems from the anthology as "Epitaphs (4), for mezzo-soprano & string orchestra, Op. 10" recorded in 2008 by Anne Sofie von Otter.
- In 1956, the German composer Wolfgang Jacobi (October 25, 1894 – December 15, 1972) set a selection of four poems as a song cycle for baritone and accordion titled "Die Toten von Spoon River."
- On June 2, 1957, the CBS Radio Network broadcast a radio adaptation of Spoon River Anthology, "Epitaphs", as part of its CBS Radio Workshop series https://www.youtube.com/watch?v=7pN9h-yeT0Y. The adaptation was directed and narrated by William Conrad, with a cast including Virginia Gregg, Jeanette Nolan, Parley Baer, Richard Crenna, John Dehner, Howard McNear and John McIntire.
- In 1963, Charles Aidman adapted Spoon River Anthology into a theater production that is still widely performed today.
- From 1964 to 1974, photographer Mario Giacomelli produced "Omaggio a Spoon River," a series of abstract photographs inspired by Edgar Lee Masters' collection of poems.
- In 1971, Italian songwriter Fabrizio De André released Non al denaro non all'amore né al cielo, a concept album inspired by Spoon River Anthology and reflecting De André's anarchist views.
- In 1985, British composer Andrew Downes set a selection of five poems as a song cycle entitled "Songs from Spoon River."
- In 1987, Spanish writer Jon Juaristi wrote a poem titled Spoon River, Euskadi (included in his book Suma de varia intención) to denounce the crimes of the Basque separatist group ETA.
- In 2000, alt-country singer Richard Buckner adapted eighteen poems of the Spoon River Anthology into songs for his album The Hill. Nine are sung, and nine are instrumental.
- In 2004, Walter Dean Myers published Here in Harlem, a collection of poems inspired by Spoon River Anthology.
- Since 2004, writer and songwriter Mariana Figueroa and artist and author Francisco Tomsich have worked on the Rio Cuchara project, a cycle of songs based on Spoon River Anthology poems.
- In 2005, the Utah State University's Creative Learning Environment Lab created a serious game titled Voices of Spoon River, in which the player explores an environment and solves puzzles based on the anthology.
- Songwriter Michael Peter Smith's song "Spoon River" is loosely based on Spoon River Anthology.
- In 2010, Dutch, Finnish and Swiss ad-hoc band The Ho Orchestra (including Dutch cult band The Nits and Finnish folk-superstars Värttinä) performed a song cycle loosely based on the Spoon River Anthology. Most of the songs were recorded and released for an album called Spoon River - a lakeside concert. Four of the songs are available on YouTube.
- In 2011 Spoon River Anthology was adapted by Tom Andolora into a theatre production with music, called The Spoon River Project. It was performed at the Green-Wood Cemetery in Brooklyn.
- In 2014, Toronto's Soulpepper theatre launched the musical production Spoon River, adapted by Mike Ross and artistic director Albert Schultz. The musical opened Off Broadway in July 2017.
- In 2015, Arkansan poet samm binns exhibited "Larger Than Life," an adaptation featuring photos and poems in response to the 100th anniversary of Spoon River Anthology.
- In 2015, Spoon River Anthology was adapted by Maureen Lucy O'Connell into a play with music called Spoon River: the Cemetery on the Hill. The adaptation included traditional songs as well as original material written by O'Connell. It was produced at the Eclectic Company Theatre in Valley Village, California.
- On November 26, 2015, the documentary Ritorno a Spoon River, directed by Francesco Conversano and Nene Grignaffini, premiered at the Torino Film Festival. The documentary, filmed in Lewistown, celebrates the centennial of the anthology.
- In 2017, Return to Spoon River, a musical adapted from the anthology by Martin Tackel, premiered at the Lion Theatre at Theatre Row in New York City.
- On March 13, 2021, Spoon River Anthology was presented as an online verse reading by the Oxford University Dramatic Society, accompanied by a limited edition booklet illustrated by students of the Ruskin School of Art.
