= Parrish Sisters =

American photographers (early 20th century)

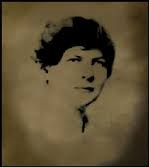
Williamina Parrish

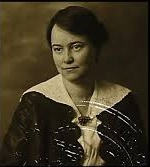
Grace Parrish

Williamina Parrish (September 9, 1879 – January 3, 1941) and Grace Parrish (August 21, 1881 – March 9, 1954) were a duo of American photographers who worked together as The Parrish Sisters at the beginning of the twentieth century.

Williamina "Will" Parrish was considered the leader of The Potters, a group of late teens/early twenties female artists publishing, from 1904 to 1907, The Potter's Wheel, a monthly artistic and literary magazine. She was also the editor of the magazine. The name The Potter's Wheel was inspired by the facing pair of potters made by Caroline Risque which appeared in the inaugural November 1904 magazine.

Grace Parrish, Will's younger sister, was also a very successful photographer. She was also a model and a violinist.

== Early life and family ==
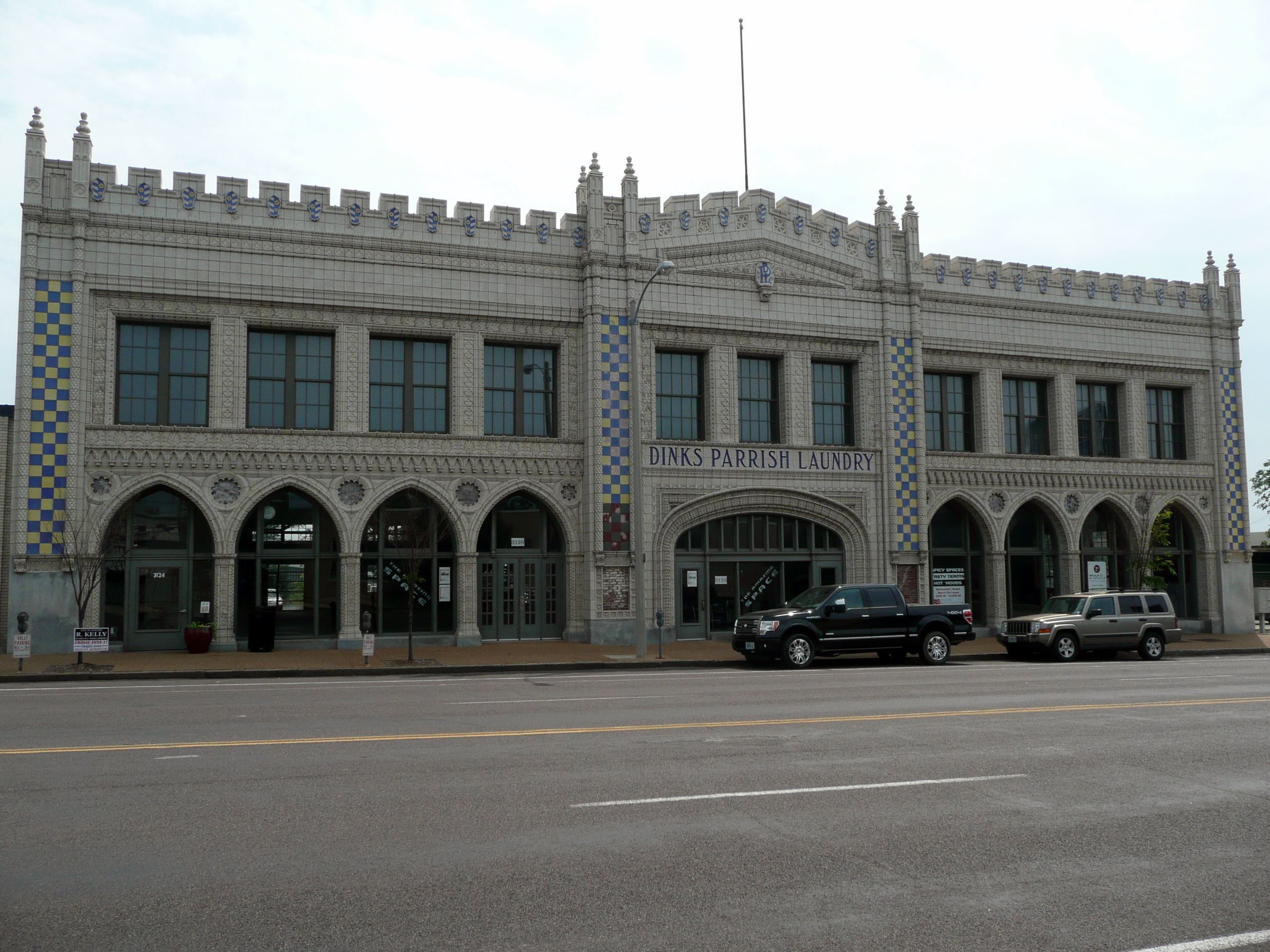
Dinks Parish Laundry

The Parrish sisters were born into an upper-middle-class family in St. Louis. Williamina Dinks Parrish was born on September 9, 1879, in St Louis, Missouri, and Grace Susan Parrish was born on August 21, 1881. Their parents were Dinks L. Parrish, from Bowling Green, Virginia, and Aggie Cooper, from Camden, South Carolina. They had another sister Isabel C. Parrish who would marry Morgan T. McCormick.

In 1902 Dinks Parrish was in business with J. Arthur Anderson, owner of the J. Arthur Anderson Laundry (currently a St. Louis Landmark Beaux Arts building at 4940 Washington Boulevard). Parrish worked in the men's clothing business before starting his own laundry in 1892. His other interests were horse and dog shows and he belonged to the Missouri Athletic Club. After the partnership with Anderson ended, Parrish opened his own business "Dinks Parrish Laundry" in 1916, again currently a St. Louis Historical Landmark and a NRHP listing in St. Louis, a Late Gothic Revival-style building at 3120 Olive Street with a blue-and-white terra-cotta facade. The building was designed by architect Will Levy, prominent St. Louis architect, who designed a number of Central West End buildings, including the Mahler Ballroom and the first Jewish Hospital Building on Delmar.

== Career ==
"... my younger sister Grace and I work together and that is the only reason any of our pictures are worth while. So you will please put us together in speaking of them, as it would be unfair to say that I alone had made the photographs. We think and work together for one end – Art"

— Williamina Parrish, Western Camera Notes, June 1903

The sisters began taking photographs while still children; quoted in Western Camera Notes, June 1903, where their work was prominently featured, they stated that they had begun six years previously.

The St. Louis Post-Dispatch touted that the Parrish Sisters were "two of the cleverest young amateurs" and their work "equals work done by professional photographers of many years' experience".

The Parrish Sisters started their professional career in 1904 after attending the St. Louis World's Fair: the first work were a set of photographs by Will Parrish of the nine muses, with Grace Parrish posing for each of them in Greek dress.

Will Parrish ran, together with Grace Parrish, a photography studio in St. Louis, at 5607 Cabanne Place. She was also a poet and painter. She was widely published as a photographer in specialized journals. Will Parrish used a special stained window-glass effect in her magazine illustrations.

They faced also rejection; in a letter of 1917 from Alfred Stieglitz to Will Parrish, rejecting some of her photographs for his gallery: "The Little Gallery is not devoted entirely to the ultra modern in painting and sculpture. It is devoted to ideas. To the development of such. And I feel that your work, good as it is, is primarily picture making. That is not adding to the idea of photography, nor to the idea of expression. And for that reason it would be out of place in the Little Gallery."

In 1930 the Parrish sisters spent time in Europe together, and later Will Parrish went to Italy alone.

== Personal life ==
Will Parrish played a major role in Sara Teasdale's life, helping her organize the poems for her first collection. They met in 1903 and Teasdale was among the initial members of The Potters.

Will Parrish died on January 3, 1941, and is buried with her parents and sister at Bellefontaine Cemetery, St. Louis, Plot: Block 52-53 lot 6001. Grace Parrish died on March 9, 1954.

== Gallery ==
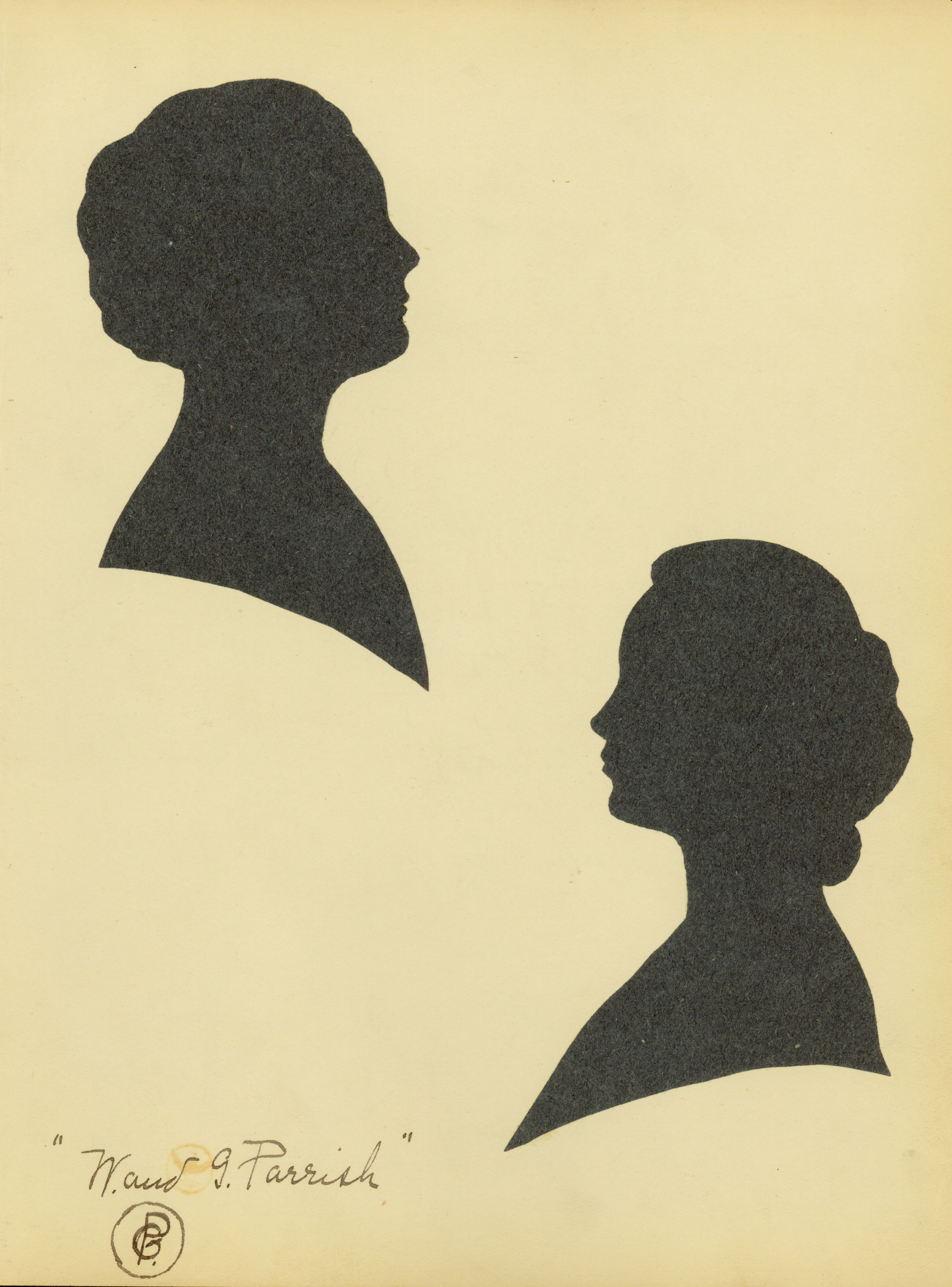
Silhouette portraits of Williamina and Grace Parrish by Grace Parrish, The Potter's Wheel, Volume 1, Number 5, page 53, March 1905

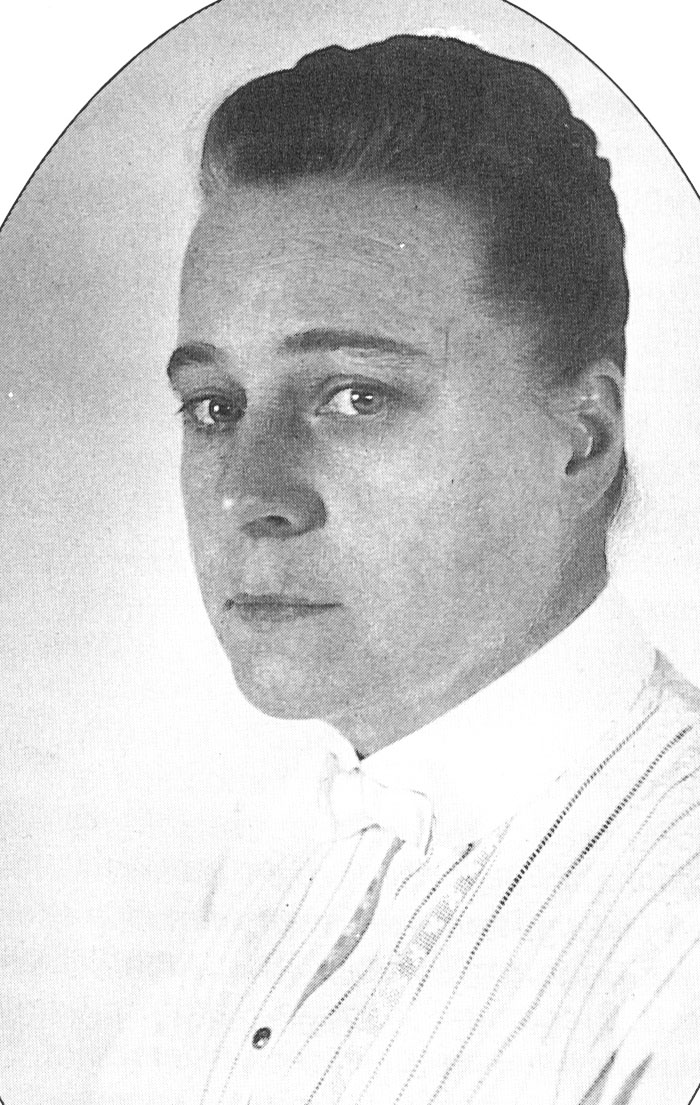
Lillie Rose Ernst, ca. 1910. Photo by the Parrish sisters. Missouri History Museum

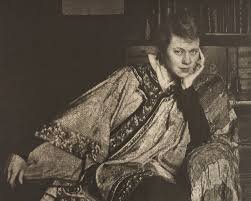
Guida Richey, ca. 1914. Born in 1881, Guida Richey lived at 5555 Cabanne Avenue, one block down the street from the Parrish Sisters. Grace and Guida remained close friends and often travelled together

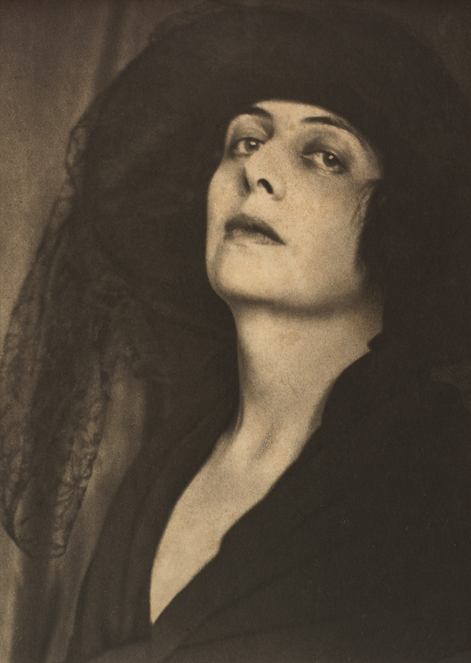
Dorothy Fellowes-Gordon by The Parrish Sisters

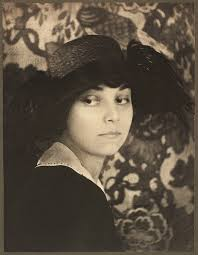
Marguerite Kauffman Fischel, published author and music composer, wife of Dr. Ellis Fischel, a prominent cancer surgeon
