= Caroline Risque =

American painter

Caroline Everett Risque
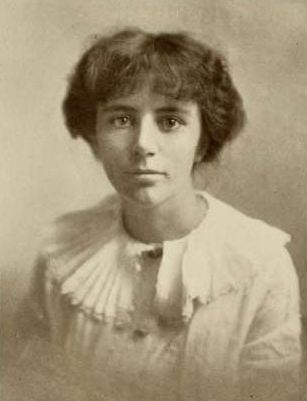
- Photo from Notable Women of St. Louis, 1914, credited to Gerhard Sisters
- Born: August 20, 1883; United States
- Died: April 9, 1952 (aged 68)
- Resting place: Bellefontaine Cemetery, St. Louis, U.S.
- Education: Washington University in St. Louis, Art Students League of New York, Académie Colarossi
- Known for: Decorative works: fountains, gates, portals and mantels
- Spouse: Julien Janis (m. 1903)
- Children: 1

Caroline Everett Risque Janis (August 20, 1883 – April 9, 1952) was an American painter, sculptor and a member of the early 20th-century artistic group The Potters.

== Early life ==
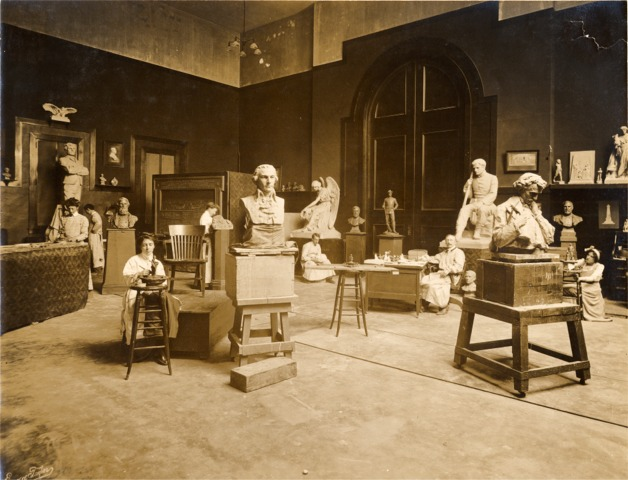
George Julian Zolnay had just completed the lions for Edward Gardner Lewis' Lion Gates when he became director of the People's University's Art Academy and head of the sculpture division. In this photograph, he is in the studio with several of the sculpture honors students. Christian Kiehl is on the left at the high bench. Caroline Risque is on the left working on a piece of sculpture on a stool. Zolnay is seated at the desk just right of center. Nancy Coonsman is kneeling on the far right. The large pieces of sculpture in the room are Zolnay's work.

Caroline Risque was the daughter of Ferdinand William Risque, born in Georgetown, D.C., and Aline Tilghman (Brooks) Risque, of Mobile, Alabama. She had two surviving sisters out of a total of five siblings: Aline Brooks Risque (1885–1964), who married Vice-Admiral Lloyd Toulmin Chalker, of New York; and Ethel Risque (b. 1889) who married John Blizard, of Ottawa.

Risque went first to Miss Lockwood's kindergarten, for two years, and then she studied with a private tutor, Jennie Harris, until she was ten years old. Her secondary studies were at the Marquette High School, followed by several years at Hosmer Hall, a preparatory school in St. Louis, under Louise McNair. It was at Hosmer Hall that she met Sara Teasdale and in 1903 introduced her to Williamina Parrish; these early meetings led to the founding of The Potter's Wheel monthly magazine.

Risque attended the St. Louis School of Fine Arts, under George Julian Zolnay, and followed him at the University City, Missouri in 1909, when Zolnay became director of the Art Academy. Risque then attended the Art Students League of New York and finally the Académie Colarossi in Paris, studying under Paul Wayland Bartlett and Jean Antoine Injalbert.

== Career ==
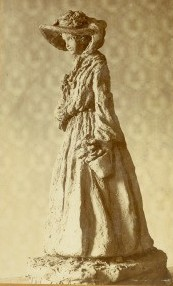
Clay Sketch by Caroline Risque, The Potter's Wheel, Volume 1, Number 7, page 20, May 1905

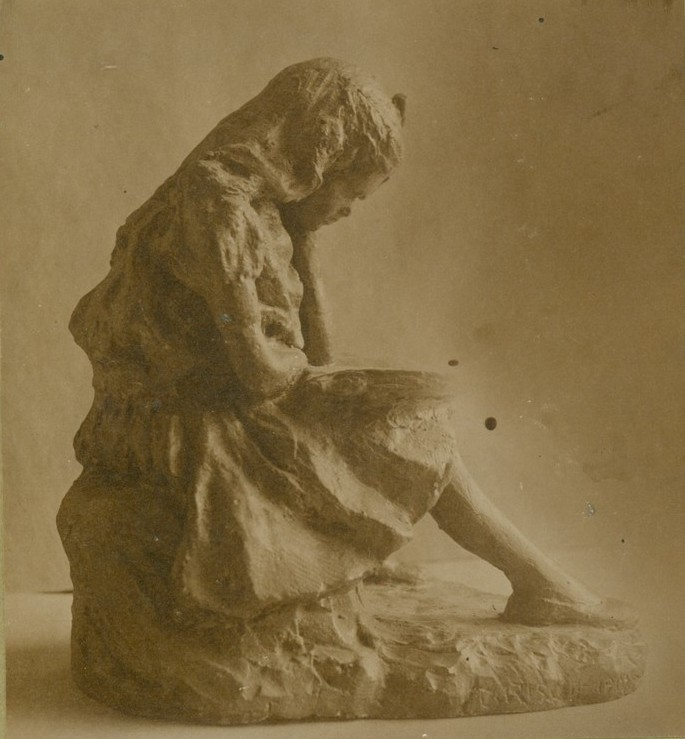
Bronze Sketch of a Child (from Life), sculpture by Caroline Risque with photographs by Williamina Parrish, The Potter's Wheel, Volume 2, Number 9, page 8, July 1906

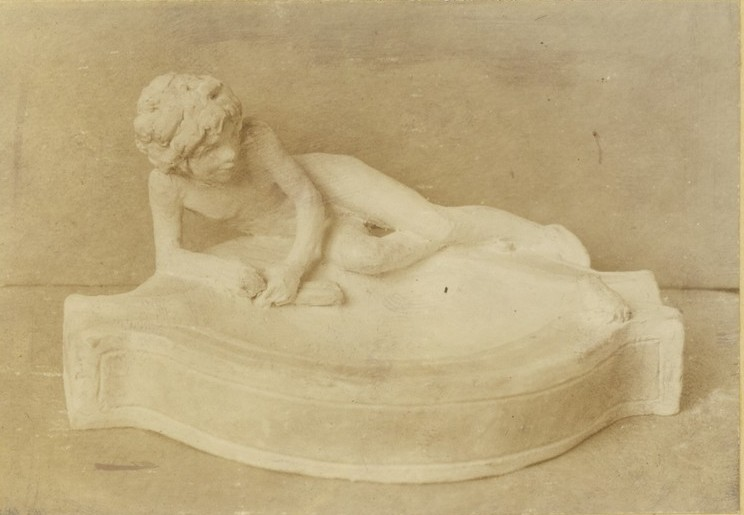
Terra-cotta ash receiver by Caroline Risque, The Potter's Wheel, Volume 3, Number 3, page 12, January 1907

Before moving to Paris for two years, both studying and working, Caroline Risque was a sculptor of local fame. Her first sales were to her own teachers at the Art School at Washington University.

One of Risque's most ambitious pieces of work, modeled in her own Paris studio, was a fountain which was exhibited at the 1913 Paris Salon. which was favorably received by the French press. Her ambition was to create decorative works: fountains, gates, portals and mantels; objects and subjects in which she could be entirely original.

Risque sold many pieces while abroad, one of them going to the home of an ambassador, and another to the New Orleans Museum of Art.

In 1915 Risque exhibited five pieces at the Panama–Pacific International Exposition, a world fair held in San Francisco between February 20 and December 4, 1915. Her pieces were: the paintings Mere Colaer, In the Morning, Josef, The Old One, and Bird Fountain, a sculpture. In 1916 Risque exhibited at the Pennsylvania Academy of the Fine Arts.

Risque was a teacher at John Burroughs School where she founded the art department and became chair. In 1929 Risque helped Marion Rombauer Becker, daughter of Irma S. Rombauer, obtain a position in the Art Department.

She said when it came to her work, she wished that no leniency be shown because it was created by a woman. She wanted to stand or fall as an artist, and not as a "woman artist".

In 1984 the bronze busts of the four founders of Stix Baer & Fuller, a department store chain in St. Louis, were donated to the Missouri Historical Society by the Stix, Baer and Fuller families. The busts, made by Risque, had been in the Stix Baer & Fuller's downtown store, and were removed when the store was acquired by Dillard's.

== Personal life ==
Caroline Risque lived in St. Louis and New Orleans. She was small in stature, had black hair and beautiful gray eyes, unusual in their size and particularly their expression.

Back in the United States from Paris, Risque married Julien Janis (1883–1951), president of the Missouri Safe Deposit Association, and they had one daughter, Aline Janis Herrera (1920–2013). Risque's daughter later said her mother's commitment to art suffered from her marriage and from having a child.

Risque is buried at Bellefontaine Cemetery, St. Louis, together with her family members. Her husband Julien Janis is buried in nearby Calvary Cemetery.

== Legacy ==
The Sam Fox School of Design & Visual Arts, the visual arts and design degree granting branch of Washington University in St. Louis, grants each year the Caroline Risque Janis Prize in Sculpture.
