= Albert Bloch =

American artist (1882–1961)

- Albert Bloch in his studio, Munich
- Born: August 2, 1882 August 2, 1882; Saint Louis, Missouri, US
- Died: March 23, 1961 (aged 78) March 23, 1961; Lawrence, Kansas, US
- Known for: Painter

Albert Bloch (August 2, 1882 – March 23, 1961) was an American Modernist artist and the only American artist associated with Der Blaue Reiter (The Blue Rider), a group of early 20th-century European modernists.

== Biography ==
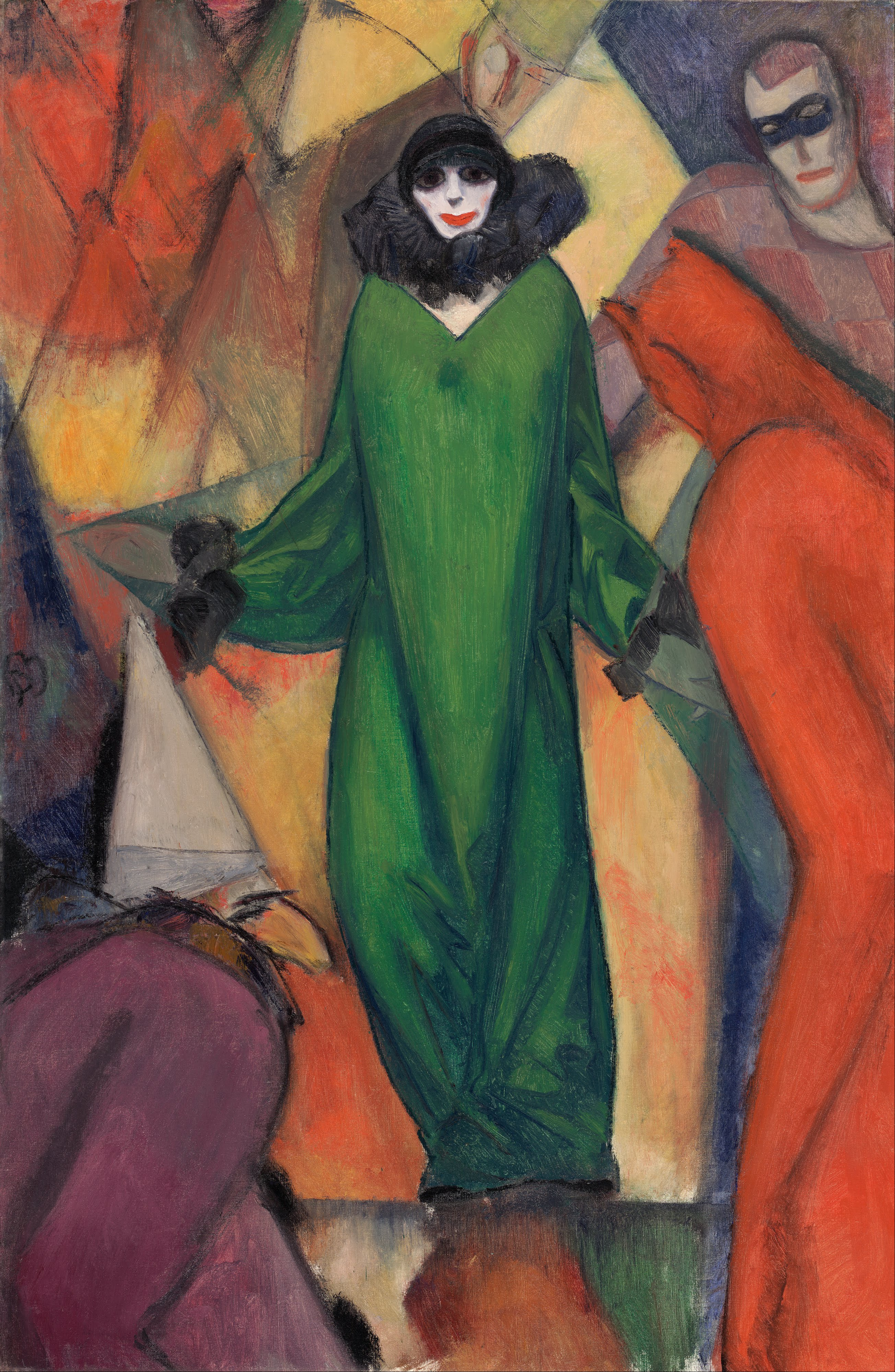
Albert Bloch, 1913, The Green Domino, oil on canvas, 130.5 x 85 cm

Bloch was born on August 2, 1882, in St. Louis, Missouri. He studied at the St. Louis School of Fine Arts and the Chicago Academy of Fine Arts. In 1901–03 he produced comic strips and cartoons for the St. Louis Star newspaper. Between 1905 and 1908 he worked as a caricaturist and illustrator for William Marion Reedy's literary and political weekly The Mirror.

From 1909 to 1921, Bloch lived and worked mainly in Germany, where he was associated with Der Blaue Reiter. After the end of World War I, Bloch returned to the United States, teaching at the School of the Art Institute of Chicago for a year, and then accepting a Departmental Head position at the University of Kansas until his retirement in 1947.

Albert Bloch died March 23, 1961, in Lawrence, Kansas.

Albert Bloch had two sons, Bernard and Walter, with his first wife, Hortense. Bernard Bloch, was a distinguished American linguist.

His work is in the collection of the Art Institute of Chicago, The Jewish Museum, the Museum of Modern Art, the Smithsonian American Art Museum, the Nelson-Atkins Museum of Art and the Whitney Museum of American Art.

== Selected works ==
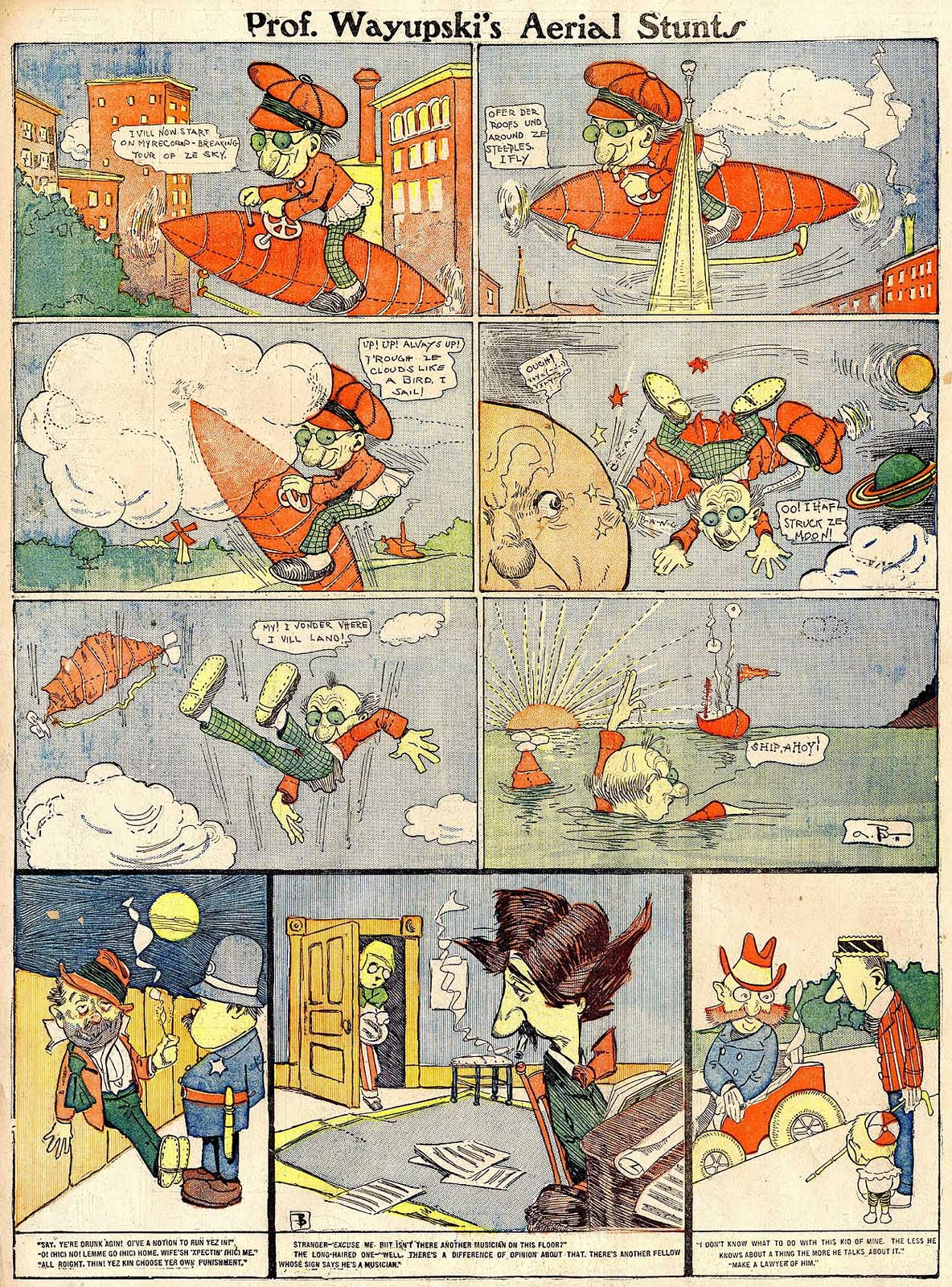
Albert Bloch, 1902, "Prof. Wayupski's Aerial Stunts", St. Louis Star

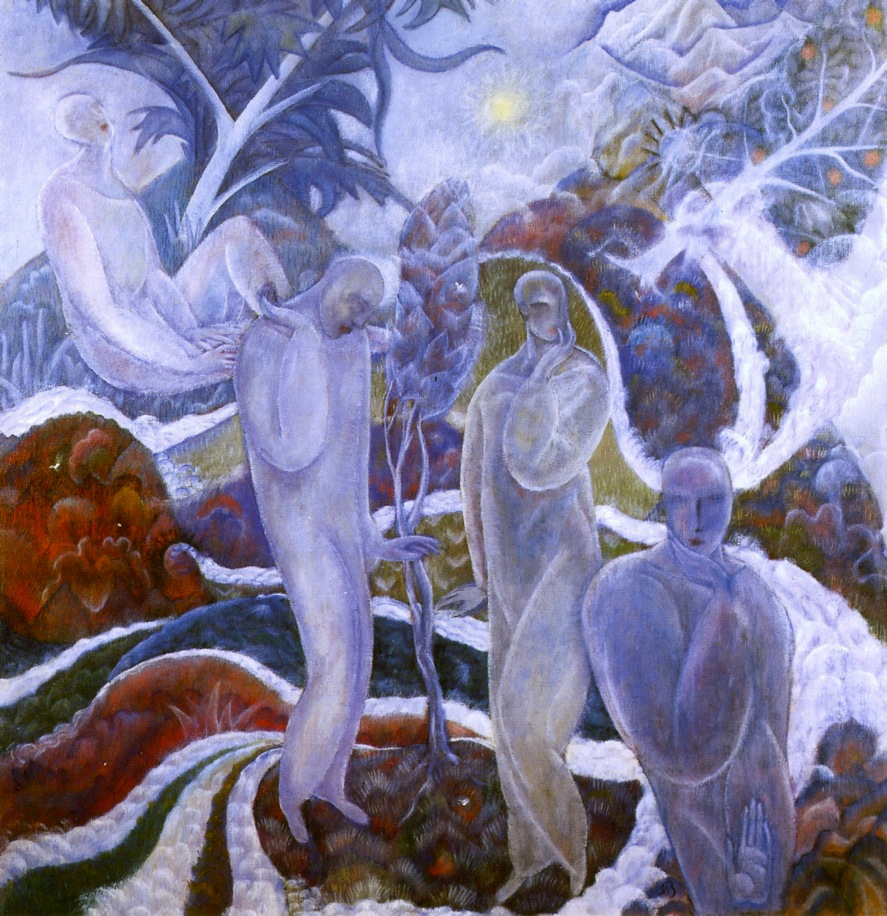
Albert Bloch, 1913, Summer Night, oil on canvas, 119 x 114 cm
