= Petronelle Sombart =

American artist and dancer

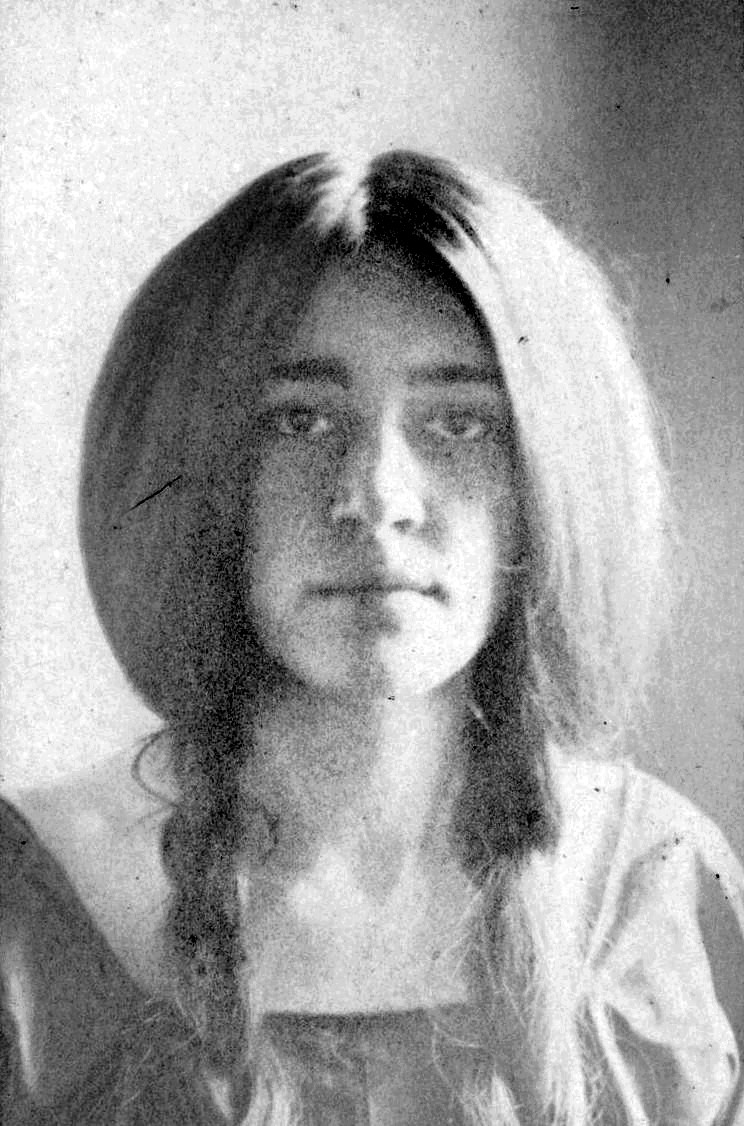
Petronelle by Williamina Parrish

Petronelle Sombart Majer (1897-1949) was one of the original members of The Potters. Other than artist and designer, she was also an actress who performed on Broadway and translated dramatic works from the Italian.

== Early life ==
Petronelle Sombart was born on August 10, 1897, in Boonville, Missouri, the daughter of Robert and Emma Sombart.

== Career ==
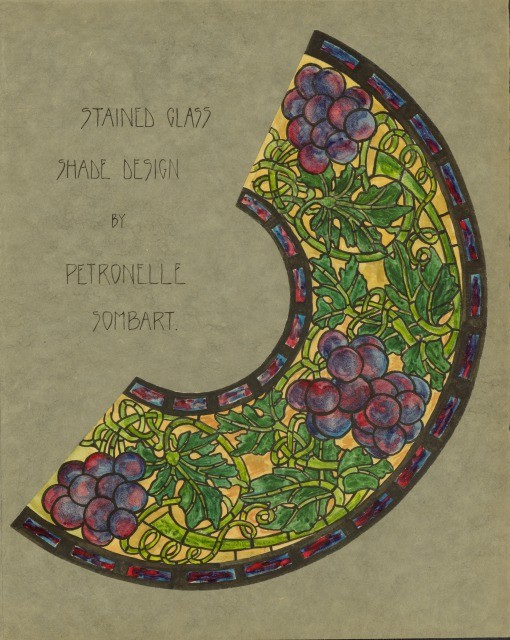
Stained glass shade design by Petronelle Sombart

After leaving St. Louis, Missouri, and before moving to California in 1919, Petronelle Sombart spent many years in Italy and New York City.

Sombart, who possessed a lyric soprano voice, studied for grand opera in Milan.

While in New York City, she worked as professional dancer and had a studio at 303 West 4th Street. She frequented Theodore Dreiser and their relationship continued until she moved to California in 1919, but they continued to correspond frequently.

From late 1921 to beginning of the 1922 she spent eight months touring Europe with her friend Agnes Cady.

== Personal life ==
Petronelle Sombart married Dr. Robert George Majer (1901-1982) and lived at 201 S. Lorraine Blvd., Los Angeles, California.

She died on October 6, 1949, and is buried at Forest Lawn Memorial Park (Glendale).
