= Harris Merton Lyon =

American short story writer (1882–1916)

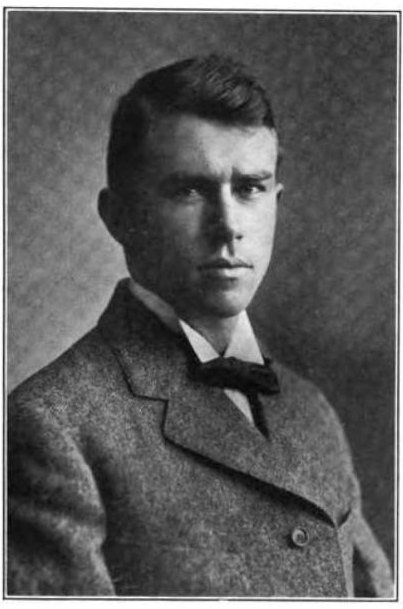
Harris Merton Lyon circa 1909

Harris Merton Lyon (1882–1916) was an American short story writer.

== Biography ==
Harris Merton Lyon was born in Santa Fe, New Mexico in 1882. He attended the University of Missouri while working at a restaurant and laundrette. By the early 1900s, he moved to New York City to work as a journalist and as a short story writer. His stories were published in Broadway Magazine, edited by Theodore Dreiser, and later in McClure's, Collier's, The Smart Set, and The Illustrated Sunday Magazine. In 1908, he published his first collection of short stories, Sardonics, followed by Graphics in 1913.

A newspaper from February 1908 reproduced a photo of a 17-year-old Japanese woman named Hyacinth Tawana, who the caption said was coming to America to marry Lyon. The caption stated Lyon "had rescued his bride-to-be from a very perilous situation in Japan, and the romance followed."

In 1913, he moved to a farm in Colebrook, Connecticut and started writing a series of anonymous letters for Reedy's Mirror. He died of Bright's disease three years later.

Theodore Dreiser wrote a portrait based on Lyon in Twelve Men. Dreiser nicknamed him 'Maupassant, Jr'.

== Bibliography ==
- Sardonics (1908)
- Graphics (1913)
