= Henry Slonimsky =

Henry Slonimsky (October 9, 1884 – March 12, 1970) was a Belarusian-born Jewish-American professor.

== Life ==
Slonimsky was born in Lyakhovichi, Minsk Governorate, Russian Empire, on October 9, 1884, the son of Moses A. Slonimsky and Sarah Epstein.

Slonimsky immigrated to America in 1890. He graduated from the Central High School of Philadelphia in 1901. He attended at Haverford College in 1902, the University of Pennsylvania from 1902 to 1904 and the University of Berlin from 1905 to 1907. He then studied with Hermann Cohen at the University of Marburg and received a Ph.D. from him in 1912. After returning to America, he worked as a lecturer in philosophy for Columbia University from 1914 to 1915, followed by Johns Hopkins University as instructor and associate in philosophy from 1915 to 1921. He then moved to Cincinnati and was superintendent of the Jewish Settlement there from 1921 to 1922. He was a professor at Hebrew Union College from 1922 to 1924.

Slonimsky studied at the Hochschule für die Wissenschaft des Judentums when he was in Berlin. In 1924, he was made professor of ethics and philosophy of religion at the Jewish Institute of Religion in New York City. He became dean in 1926 and retired in 1952. He taught generations of future American rabbis and shared intellectual and human problems with his students. His dissertation was published in 1913 under the title Heraklit und Parmenides. His studies in Jewish philosophy, Essays, was published in 1967. His philosophy was influenced by his teacher Hermann Cohen. He helped shape the academic structure of the Jewish Institute of Religion, defining it as a "free school, free from dogmas, free from orthodoxy, free from reform, where teachers are free to teach what they think best and where students are not bound by any obligations to conform."

In 1917, Slonimsky married Marion Cummings. She died in 1926. In 1927, he married Minnie Tennenbaum, daughter of Simon Tennenbaum. He was a member of American Philosophical Association.

Slonimsky died in New York City on March 12, 1970.
