= Dorothy Fellowes-Gordon =

British socialite and singer

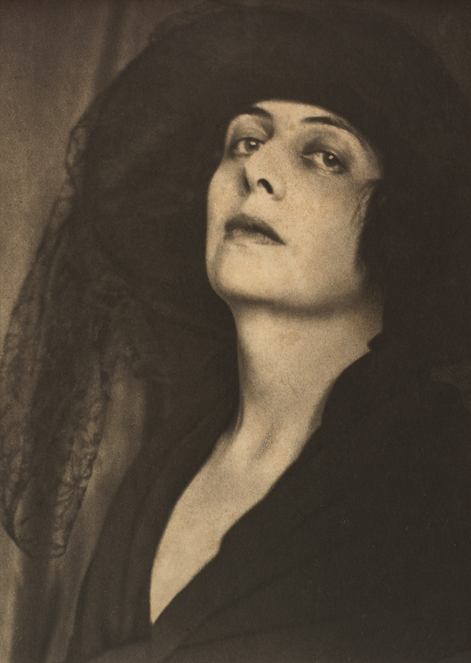
Portrait of Dorothy Fellowes-Gordon by The Parrish Sisters

Dorothy Mary "Dickie" Fellowes-Gordon (3 August 1891 – 11 August 1991) was a British socialite, coal industry heiress and singer.

== Early life ==
Dorothy Mary Fellowes-Gordon was born on 3 August 1891 in London, the daughter of Arthur William Fellowes-Gordon of Knockespoch, Aberdeenshire, Scotland and his first wife, Mary Beatrice Green. Her paternal grandfather was ADM William Abdy Fellowes-Gordon, son of Rear Admiral Sir Thomas Fellowes and Katherine Mary Abdy (eldest daughter of Sir William Abdy, 6th Baronet). He married Hannah Gordon of Knockespoch in Edinburgh on 16 June 1857, therefore assuming the additional surname of Gordon by Royal Licence in 1876. The Fellowes-Gordon came from Clatt, Aberdeenshire, Scotland. Dickie was a distant cousin of The Hon. Reginald Ailwyn Fellowes (1884–1953), and therefore linked to the latter wife, socialite Daisy Fellowes, and Winston Churchill, who was first cousin of Reginald. Her parents divorced in 1904 and her mother remarried Lt Col Alexander Keith Wyllie in 1906.

== Career ==
=== As singer ===
Fellowes-Gordon was classically trained as a lyric soprano with Enrico Caruso. Later she performed professionally "Voyons Manon" from Massenet's "Manon", and two French arias in New York in 1916. When she was almost 40 years old, following the advice of her mentor Arturo Toscanini, she spent two years studying music in Milan. She attended the world premiere of Giacomo Puccini's Turandot directed by Toscanini at Teatro alla Scala, Milan on 26 April 1926, when Toscanini stopped the opera at the same point where Puccini, dying, had left it, and Toscanini said "Thus far the master wrote". She was a friend of the American soprano Grace Moore.

=== As socialite ===
Fellowes-Gordon made her debut into society on 24 May 1911 at the court held by George V and Mary of Teck. When Fellowes-Gordon's mother died, Dorothy, who was living with her and her stepfather, left Wyllie's house and went to live with other relatives. It was around this time she was to meet Elsa Maxwell, while on a travel in South Africa; Maxwell came back to London with Fellowes-Gordon and they soon went to live together at Drayton Gardens, London, in 1912. In 1928, at the death of Wyllie, she inherited part of his coal industry's estate, that was put aside at her mother's death.

During World War I, Fellowes-Gordon, who was living in London, moved to New York City to stay with Elsa Maxwell and helping back England in its war effort, mainly through her social connections. Once at a party Maxwell and Fellowes-Gordon organised together to raise money, the main guest was Princess Helena Victoria of Schleswig-Holstein, granddaughter of Queen Victoria, escorted by Napier Sturt, 3rd Baron Alington; they decided the guest list with the help of Noël Coward and among who attended there were: Lady Diana Cooper, Viola Tree, Oliver Messel, Bea Lillie, Gertrude Lawrence and Ivor Novello.

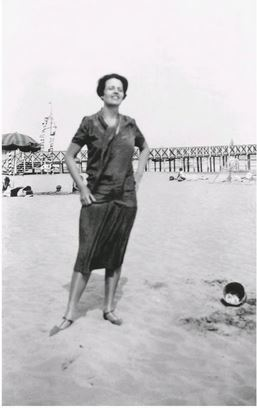
Dorothy "Dickie" Fellowes-Gordon on the Venice Lido, 1926

Part of the same crowd moved to Venice in 1926, where Maxwell was hired by the Italian government to revamp the Venice Lido. Maxwell and Coward travelled at Fellowes-Gordon's expenses, and joined Oliver Messel and Hugo Rumbold. Rumbold, a cross-dresser, asked Fellowes-Gordon's permission to use her wardrobe.

A trivial info is that many of the recipes in Elsa Maxwell's "How to Do It" (1957) are by Fellowes-Gordon, like Bulgarian Cream, Curry, Omelet a la Creme, Onion Tart and so on.

== Personal life ==
Elsa Maxwell and Fellowes-Gordon met in 1912 in Durban, where Maxwell was playing the piano at the Edward Hotel. The two became life partners and remained together until Maxwell's death in 1963.

Fellowes-Gordon was bisexual. Her other lovers included Napier Sturt, 3rd Baron Alington (who was also bisexual), Jacobo Fitz-James Stuart, 17th Duke of Alba (for eight years) and Mercedes de Acosta. Elsa Maxwell described Fellowes-Gordon as "A tall, stunning girl, the best and most helpful friend I have ever known ... Dickie ... had the beauty and sharp wit that were to make her one of Europe's femmes fatale, a role she attained without half trying."

Like many others of the LGBT community of the 1920s, Fellowes-Gordon attended meetings of followers of George Gurdjieff in 1924–1925 at the home of Muriel Draper.

== Auribeau ==
In 1933, Fellowes-Gordon bought a mas in Auribeau-sur-Siagne, near Cannes. Their neighbours were former King of Britain Edward VIII and Wallis Simpson, (Duke and Duchess of Windsor), living at the Château de la Croë. According to Maxwell, they gave them a large brown earthenware setting hen for the kitchen of the farm. Fellowes-Gordon bought Le Sault (meaning waterfall) from Max Aitken, 1st Baron Beaverbrook's daughter. A millstone had been converted into a table for the garden, even if the setting wasn't comfortable at all (a photograph shows Jack L. Warner, Tyrone Power and Linda Christian, Virginia Zanuck and Darryl Zanuck, Elsa, the Duke of Windsor, Clark Gable, socialite Dolly O'Brien, and several others with knees not fitting under the table.) Fellowes-Gordon described her mas as "a charming place, with a waterfall that made a lovely sound. Altogether, about thirty-two acres. I used to grow my own vegetables."

== Later life and death ==
When Maxwell died in 1963, Fellowes-Gordon was her sole heir. At that time Fellowes-Gordon lived at the San Carlos Hotel in Manhattan. In her old age, Fellowes-Gordon met the biographer Hugo Vickers to give an interview from which Sam Staggs extensively quoted for his biography of Maxwell.

Fellowes-Gordon died in London on 11 August 1991 at 100 years old. Her good friend Philip Hoare wrote her obituary for The Independent.
