= Marion Cummings =

American poet, philosopher, and academic

Alice Marion Cummings (1876 - 1926) was a California-born poet, philosopher, and academic. She taught philosophy, psychology, and the history of education for most of her career at University of Arizona. Cummings edited two poetry anthologies and her own poetry was published in popular periodicals such as Smart Set, Harper's, Commonwealth, Lippincott's, and The Forum. Cummings had a short-lived but intense friendship with poet Sara Teasdale, who wrote several poems about Cummings. The two continued their friendship through correspondence.

Cummings married Bruce Stanley, whom she divorced in 1913, and Dr. Henry Slonimsky, whom she married in 1913. She died in 1926. She was also known as Marion Stanley and later as Marion Slonimsky.
