= Silas Bent =

American journalist, author, and lecturer

Silas Bent IV
- Born: May 9, 1882; Millersburg, Kentucky, U.S.
- Died: July 30, 1945 (aged 63); Louisville, Kentucky, U.S.
- Occupations: Author; Journalist
- Spouse: Elizabeth Sims
- Parent(s): Silas Bent (naval officer), Ann Elizabeth (Tyler) Bent

Silas Bent IV (born May 9, 1882, in Millersburg, Kentucky – d. July 30, 1945 in Greenwich, Connecticut), son of Silas Bent III and Ann Elizabeth (Tyler) Bent was an American journalist, author, and lecturer.

He spent nearly three decades as a journalist, including time as a freelance writer, and spent a year as an assistant professor at the University of Missouri School of Journalism. Bent authored several books and articles, many critiquing the practices of newspapers in their reporting. He was married to Elizabeth Sims.

== Career ==
Bent began his newspaper work in 1900 in Louisville, Kentucky, working for the Louisville Herald. After three years he moved to St. Louis and joined the staff of the St. Louis Post-Dispatch as reporter and assistant editor. He was appointed assistant professor of theory and practice of journalism at the University of Missouri School of Journalism in Columbia, Missouri when the school was opened in 1908, but resigned his position in February 1909 to return to the Post-Dispatch. Later, he did publicity work in Chicago and then spent 13 years in New York City. As a freelance writer, Bent contributed articles to The New York Times, Harper's Weekly and The Atlantic, and Reedy's Mirror, among others.

In one story, Journalism and Morality, published in The Atlantic in 1926, Bent decried the yellow journalism published in newspapers and referred to the war between Joseph Pulitzer's New York World and William Randolph Hearst's New York Journal. Bent spoke to the lack of credibility in journalism and how "reader's got so they didn't believe what they read," writing "faking didn't pay." Bent was writing about the frustration that many journalists felt at that time.

Bent's most famous work is Ballyhoo: The Voice of the Press (1927), a critical survey of newspaper practices; he also wrote Strange Bedfellows (1928), a book on contemporary political leaders; Justice Oliver Wendell Holmes: A Biography (The Vanguard Press, 1932); and Buchanan of "The Press", a Novel (The Vanguard Press, 1932), a novel about a reporter's career set in St. Louis. He died in 1945 and is buried in Bowling Green, Kentucky.

== Selected works ==
- Ballyhoo: The Voice of the Press, Boni and Liveright, 1927.
- Strange Bedfellows: a review of politics, personalities and the press, Liveright, 1928.
- Machine Made Man, Farrar and Rinehart, 1930.
- Buchanan of "The Press", a Novel, Vanguard Press, 1932.
- Slaves by the Billion: The story of mechanical progress in the home, Longmans, Green and Company, 1938. His
- Newspaper Crusaders: A Neglected Story, Whitley House, McGraw Hill Book Company Inc., 1939.

== References and external links ==
- Harpers - The Art of Ballyhoo
