= Reedy's Mirror =

American literary journal

- Editor-in-chief: William Marion Reedy; 1896–c. 1920
- Categories: literary journal
- Frequency: weekly, later monthly
- Publisher: The Sunday Mirror Company; 1891–c. 1896
- First issue: February 25, 1891
- Final issue: 1944
- Country: United States
- Based in: St. Louis
- Language: English

Reedy's Mirror was a literary journal in St. Louis, Missouri in the fin de siècle era. It billed itself "The Mid-West Weekly".

Contributors included Silas Bent, Albert Bloch, Theodore Dreiser, Robert Frost, Vachel Lindsay, Harris Merton Lyon, Ezra Pound, Carl Sandburg, Edna St. Vincent Millay, and Sara Teasdale.

Edgar Lee Masters first published parts of his Spoon River Anthology in Reedy's Mirror over the course of 1914.

== Overview ==
The journal first appeared on February 25, 1891, under the title of the Sunday Mirror, published by The Sunday Mirror Company in St. Louis. On February 28, 1895, the title was changed to The Mirror.

In October 1896, it was bought back by James Campbell, and William Marion Reedy became the editor in December 1896. He operated on a shoestring budget. The journal was renamed Reedy's Paper until May 30, 1913, when it became known as Reedy's Mirror.

An offspring of that journal called The Mirror was revived from 1920 to 1944, edited first by Charles J. Finger and finally by Barry Lewis.
