= Lillie Rose Ernst =

American educator (1870–1943)

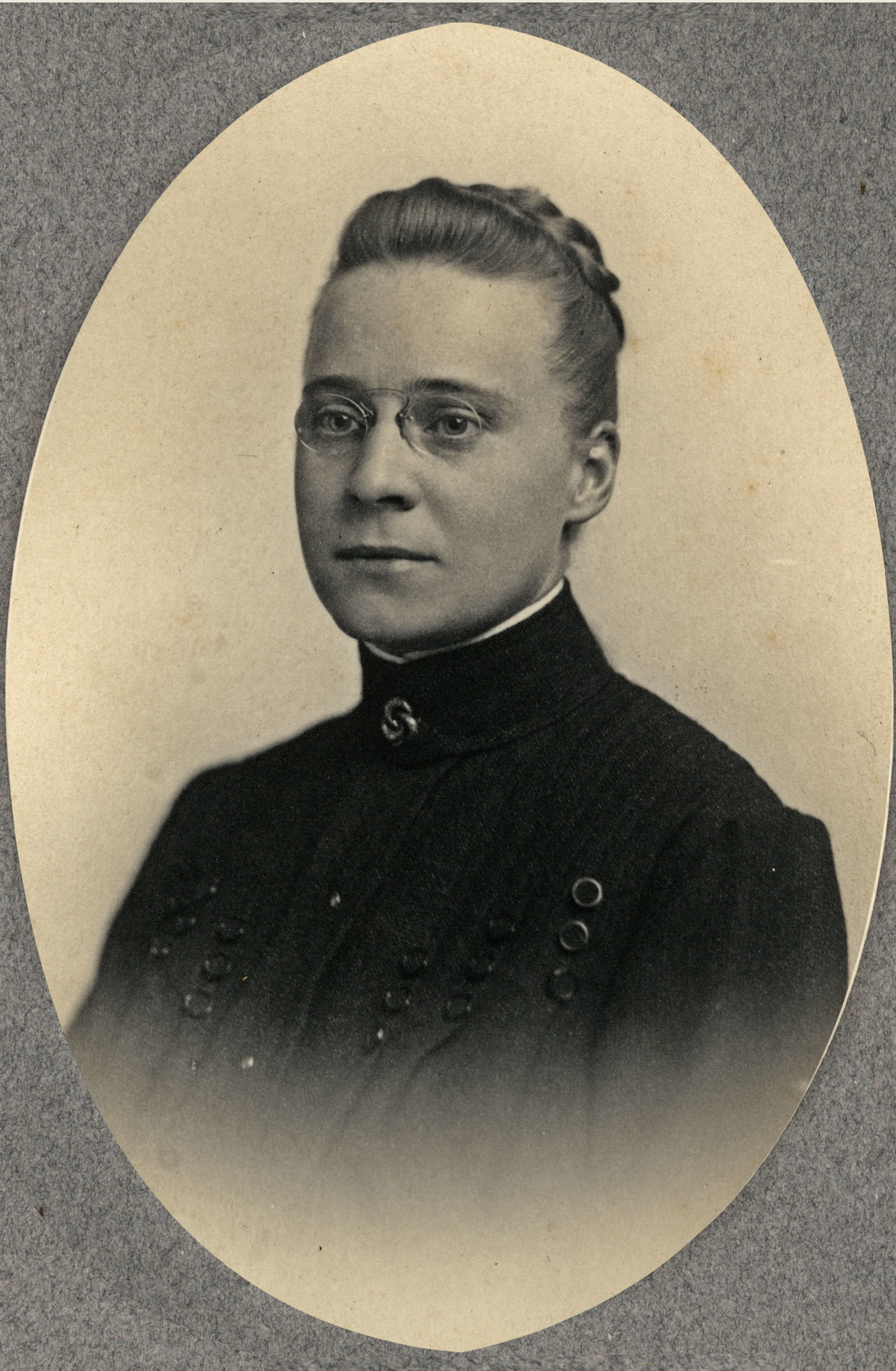
- Lillie Rose Ernst, 1892
- Born: September 14, 1870; St. Louis, Missouri, United States
- Died: December 6, 1943 (aged 73); St. Louis, Missouri, United States
- Education: Washington University in St. Louis

Lillie Rose Ernst (September 14, 1870 – December 6, 1943) was an American educator. She was the mentor of the Potters, an informal group of women artists in early 20th-century St. Louis, Missouri, and the first woman to become assistant superintendent of instruction in the St. Louis public school system.

== Early life ==
Lillie Rose Ernst was born on September 14, 1870, in St. Louis. Her family was from the middle class and she was the youngest of six children. She first attended Clay School and Ames School, and then Central High School. She went to Washington University in St. Louis, graduating magna cum laude in 1892, one of the first twelve women to graduate from this college.

She was a member of Phi Beta Kappa. As a founding member and vice-president of the Washington University Women's Alumnae Association, she received an honorary M.A. degree in 1907.

== Career ==
Ernst was a botany teacher at Central High School and then served as principal at Cote Brilliante Elementary School from 1907 to 1920. In 1920, she told her students:

It is our playtime that should net us re-creation, enthusiasm for work, joy for living, ever-widening fields for thought, deeper thrillings of the soul, reverence, and an ever growing consciousness and comprehension of truth and beauty and law.

In 1920, Ernst became assistant to the Superintendent of Instruction, the first woman to hold the title in the St. Louis public school system. A group of male principals protested Ernst's appointment to the position, believing as one said, that the promotion of a woman as superintendent "would tend to disrupt the school system". Public demonstrations followed, led by women's groups such as the League of Women Voters and members of the school board, and her nomination as superintendent was successful.

In 1926, Ernst became the principal of Mark Twain High School, becoming the first woman to obtain the title of "principal" in a public high school. She returned to be assistant to the Superintendent of Instruction in 1929 until 1934, when she became principal of Blewett High School, a position which she held until 1941, when she retired at the age of 70. While assistant to the Superintendent of Instruction she advocated for the reform of the Board of Education, to improve retention of students in high schools and to create a pension plan for retired teachers. Because she was unsuccessful in establishing a pension for teachers, she took a leave of absence instead of a retirement without benefits.

== Memberships ==
Ernst was a member of the American Ornithologists' Union, the National Education Association, the National Society for the Study of Education, the Alpine Club of Canada, the League of Women Voters, the National Audubon Society, and the Humanity Club. She was an honorary member of the Wednesday Club. She was director of the St. Louis Bird Club, the St. Louis Children's Hospital (also board member), and the Urban League of St. Louis (also board member). In 1931, Ernst was listed by the Women's Advertising Club among St. Louis's 10 leading women.

== The Potters ==
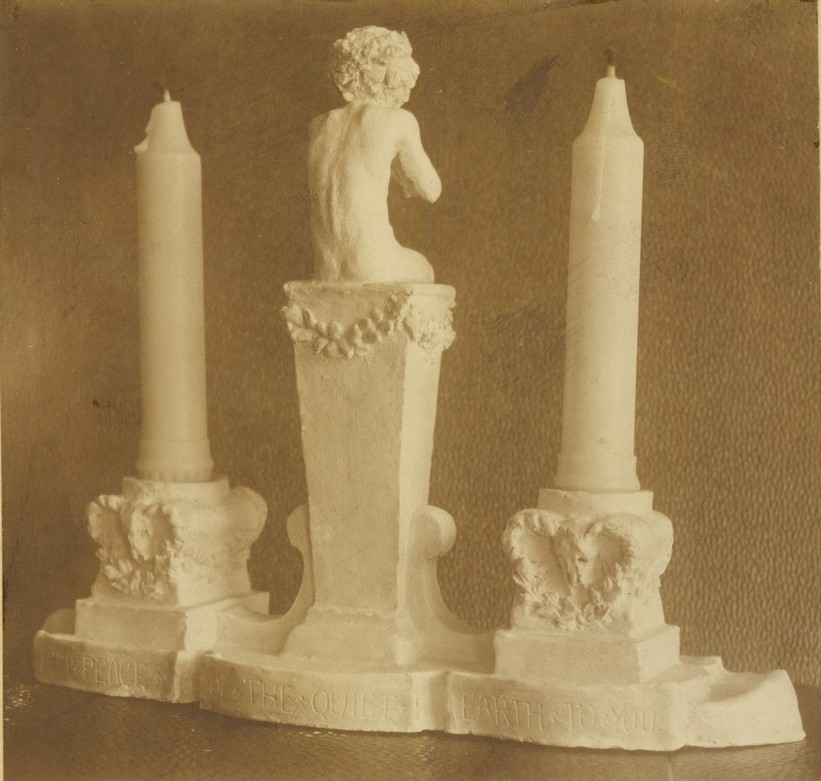
Terra-cotta candlestick sculpture done for L.R. Ernst by Caroline Risque, photographs by Williamina Parrish (back)

Ernst was a mentor for The Potters, an informal group of young women artists who published a monthly artistic and literary magazine called The Potter's Wheel between 1904 and 1907. The Potters described themselves as "idolatrous females worshipping a yellow-haired Amazon;" they called their mentor Ernst a "blond brute...the star of our existence."

The Potters included poet Sara Teasdale (1884–1933) who dedicated a sonnet to Ernst which begins:

To L.R.E.
When I first saw you – felt you take my hand
I could not speak for happiness.

== Personal life ==
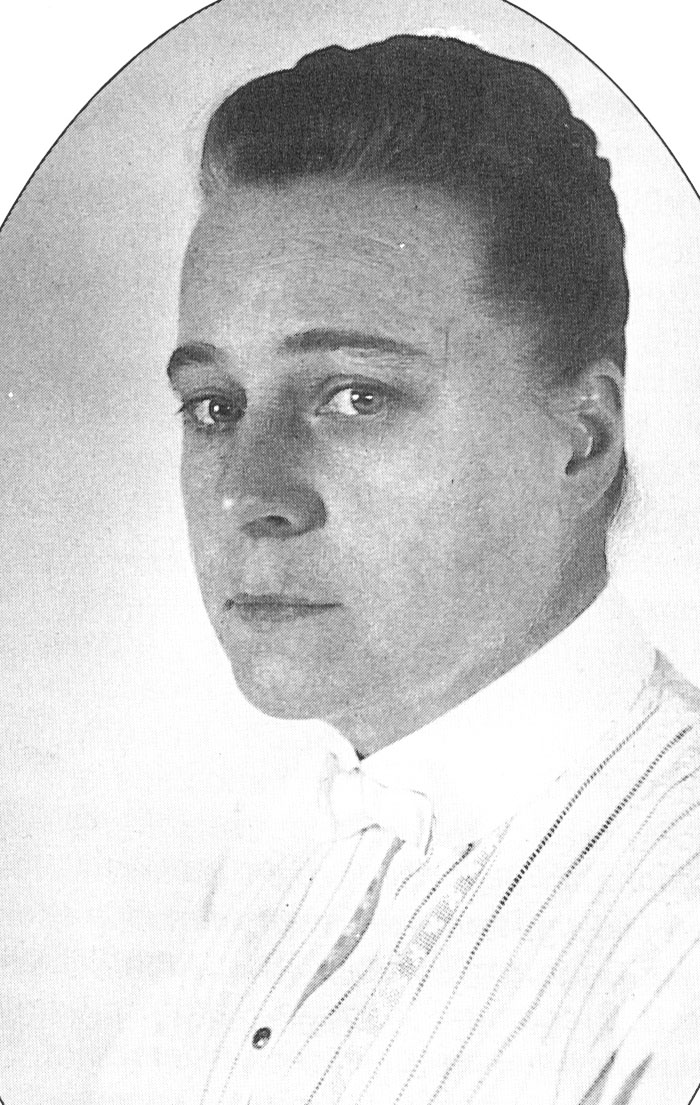
Lillie Rose Ernst, ca. 1910

Ernst's house on 6058 Kingsbury Boulevard, St. Louis, was built in 1910 and designed by architect Francis De Menil. It is part of the Skinker DeBaliviere Historic District.

Ernst never married and she lived with her two unmarried sisters. (Note: Until 1947, women teachers in the public school system were forced to retire if they married.) On Ernst's demeanor, Williame Drake wrote in 1989:

Formidable in her starched shirt-waists and gold-rimmed glasses, intensity of purpose, and ceaseless application to hard work. Even one of her hobbies, mountain climbing, was strenuous.

She was close to Leonora Halsted, author and fellow member of the Humanity Club, who, dying in 1929, left $20,000 to Ernst in "appreciation of her devoted care ... and my abiding love". For this reason, Ernst created the Leonora B. Halsted Scholarship for students in need at Washington University. Ernst died in St. Louis, on December 6, 1943.

== See also ==
- List of Washington University alumni
