= Sara Teasdale =

American writer and poet (1884–1933)

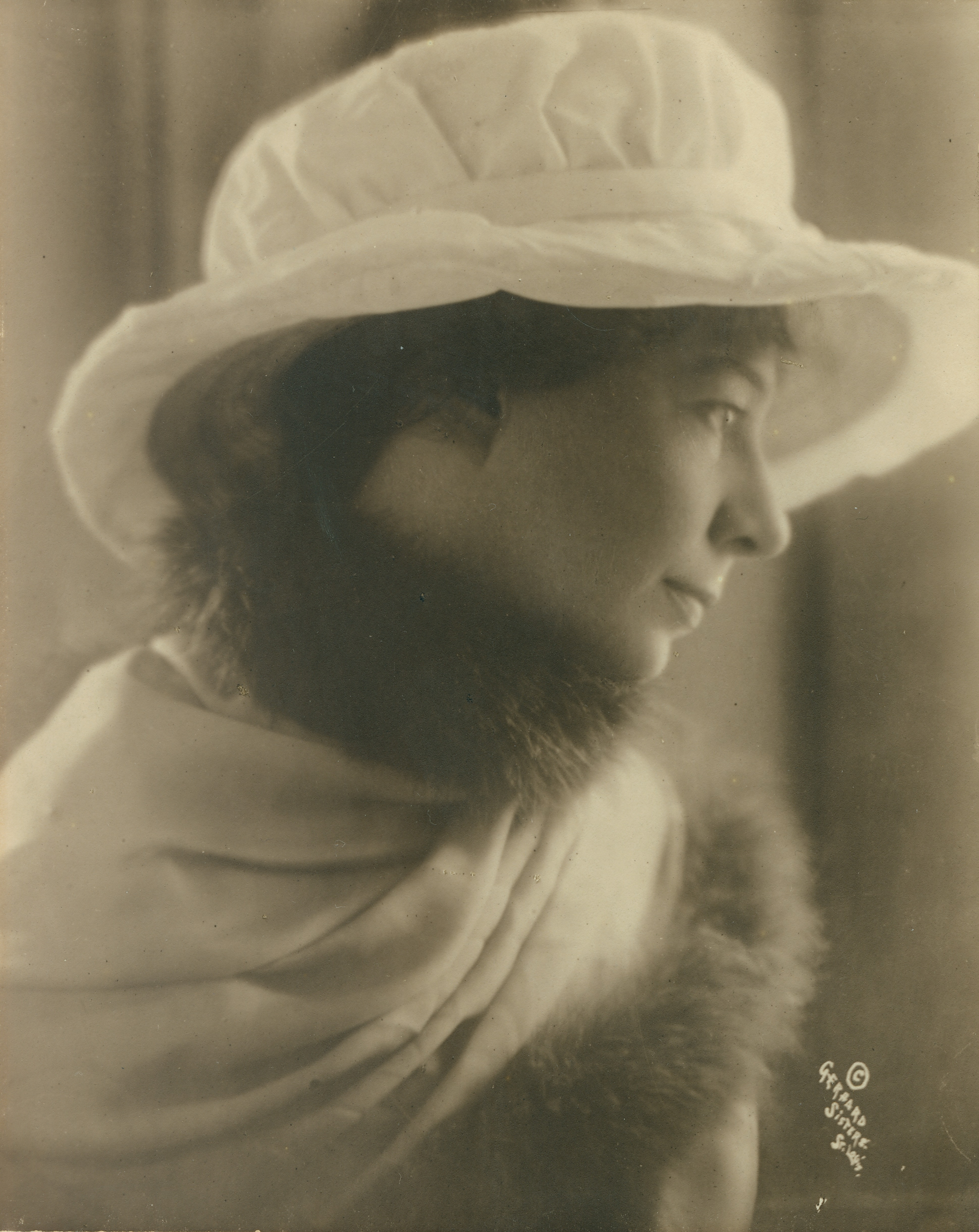
- Teasdale in 1910
- Born: Sara Trevor Teasdale; August 8, 1884; St. Louis, Missouri, U.S.
- Died: January 29, 1933 (aged 48); New York City, U.S.
- Occupation: Poet
- Spouse: Ernst Filsinger (m. 1914; div. 1929)
- Writing career
- Notable works: Flame and Shadow; Love Songs

Sara Trevor Teasdale (later Filsinger; August 8, 1884 – January 29, 1933) was an American lyric poet. She was born in St. Louis, Missouri, and used the name Filsinger after her 1914 marriage. In 1918, she won a Pulitzer Prize for her 1917 poetry collection Love Songs.

== Life ==
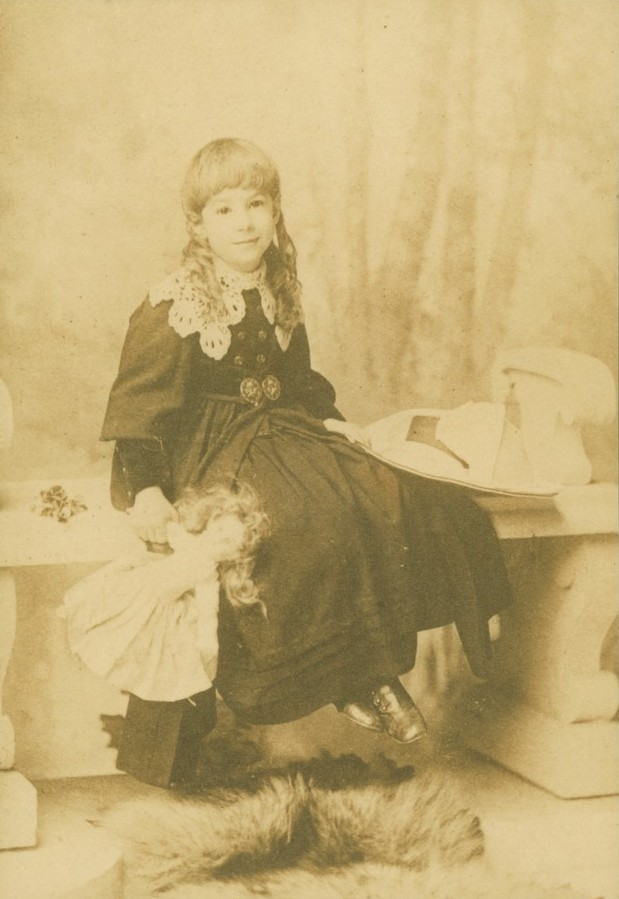
Photograph of Sara Teasdale as a young girl

Sara Trevor Teasdale was born on August 8, 1884. She had poor health for much of her childhood, so she was home schooled until age 9. It was at age 10 that she was well enough to begin school. She started at Mary Institute in 1898, but switched to Hosmer Hall in 1899, graduating in 1903. The Teasdale family lived at 3668 Lindell Blvd. and then 38 Kingsbury Place in St. Louis, Missouri. Both homes were designed by Sara's mother. The house on Kingsbury Place had a private suite for Sara on the second floor. Guests entered through a separate entrance and were admitted by appointment. This suite is where Sara worked, slept, and often dined alone.

From 1904 to 1907, Teasdale was a member of The Potters, led by Lillie Rose Ernst, a group of female artists in their late teens and early twenties who published, from 1904 to 1907, The Potter's Wheel, a monthly artistic and literary magazine in St. Louis.

Teasdale's first poem was published in William Marion Reedy's Reedy's Mirror, a local newspaper, in 1907. Her first collection of poems, Sonnets to Duse and Other Poems, was published that same year.

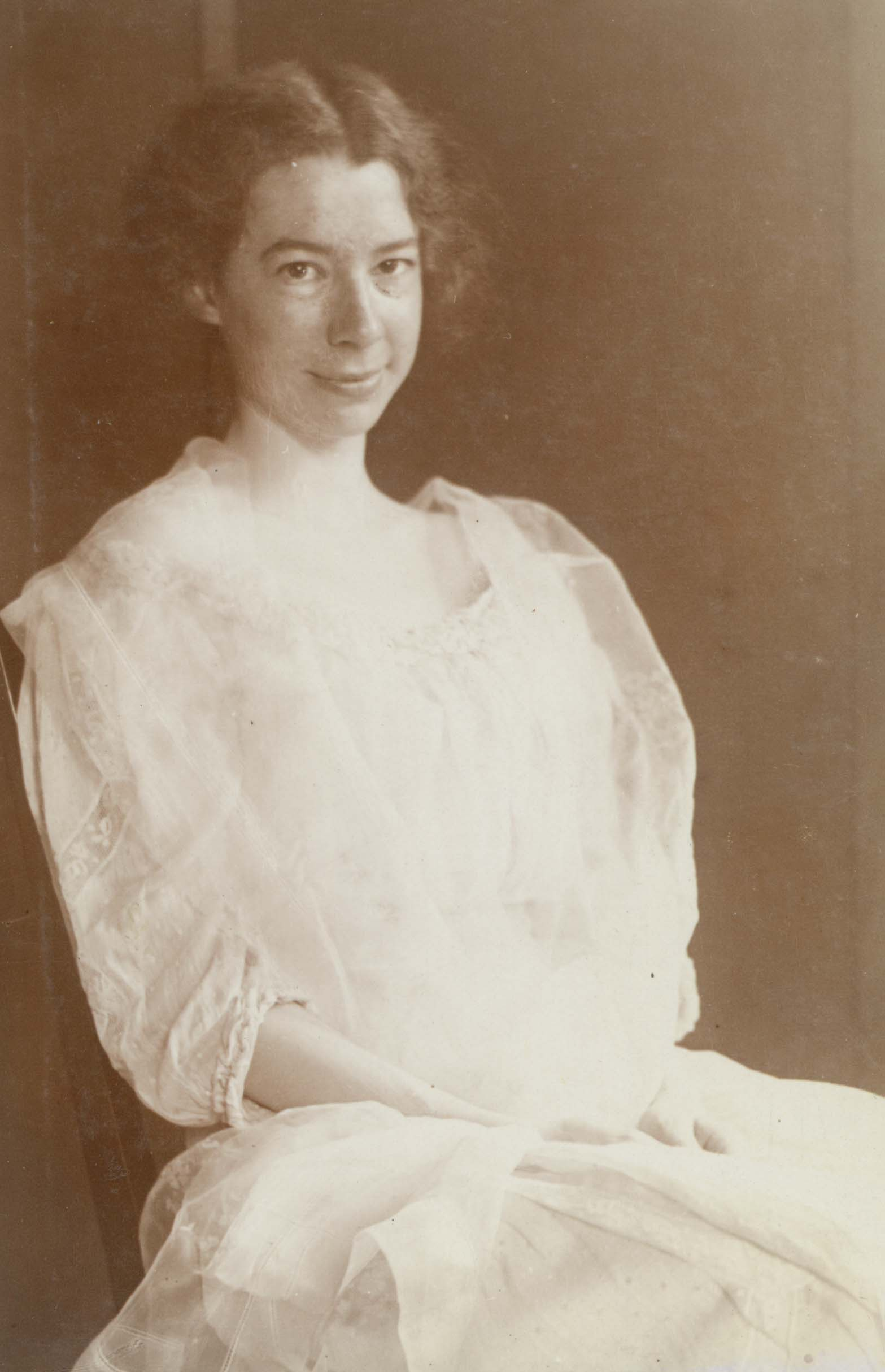
Sara Teasdale, 1907 Missouri History Museum Photograph and Print Collection. Portraits n38637

Teasdale's second collection, Helen of Troy and Other Poems, was published in 1911. It was well received by critics, who praised its lyrical mastery and romantic subject matter.

From 1911 to 1914 Teasdale was courted by several men, including the poet Vachel Lindsay, who was truly in love with her but did not feel that he could provide enough money or stability to keep her satisfied. She chose to marry Ernst Filsinger, a longtime admirer of her poetry, on December 19, 1914.

Teasdale's third poetry collection, Rivers to the Sea, was published in 1915. It was a bestseller, being reprinted several times. In 1916 she and Filsinger moved to New York City, where they lived in an Upper West Side apartment on Central Park West.

In 1918 she won a Pulitzer Prize for her 1917 poetry collection Love Songs. It was "made possible by a special grant from The Poetry Society"; however, the sponsoring organization now lists it as the earliest Pulitzer Prize for Poetry (inaugurated 1922).

Filsinger's constant business travel caused Teasdale much loneliness. In 1929, she moved interstate for three months, thereby satisfying the criterion to gain a divorce. She did not wish to inform Filsinger, only doing so at her lawyers' insistence as the divorce was going through. Filsinger was shocked. After the divorce she moved only two blocks from her old home on Central Park West. She rekindled her friendship with Vachel Lindsay, who was now married with children.

== Teasdale's suicide and "I Shall Not Care" ==
In 1933, she died by suicide, overdosing on sleeping pills, and was interred in Bellefontaine Cemetery in St. Louis. Lindsay had died by suicide two years earlier.

The poem "I Shall Not Care", with themes of abandonment, bitterness, and contemplation of death, was speculated to be her suicide note to a former lover because of its depressing undertone. However, the poem was first published in her 1915 collection Rivers to the Sea, 18 years before her suicide.

I Shall Not Care

When I am dead and over me bright April

Shakes out her rain-drenched hair,

Tho' you should lean above me broken-hearted,

I shall not care.

I shall have peace, as leafy trees are peaceful

When rain bends down the bough,

And I shall be more silent and cold-hearted

Than you are now.

== Legacy and influence ==
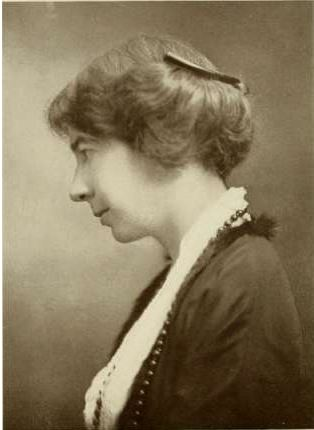
Sara Teasdale, Sarony photo, Notable women of St. Louis, 1914

- The poem "There Will Come Soft Rains" from her 1920 collection Flame and Shadow inspired and is featured in a famous short story of the same name by Ray Bradbury.
- Teasdale is the favorite poet of Arlington LeGrande, the main character of Jacquelyn Mitchard's novel The Most Wanted.
- Teasdale's poems "The New Moon", "Only in Sleep" and "Stars" were set as choral pieces by Ēriks Ešenvalds, a Latvian composer, for Musica Baltica.
- "I Shall Not Care" from the 1915 Collected Poems appeared in the 1966 young adult novel Up a Road Slowly by Irene Hunt.
- She was a major influence on academic Marion Cummings.
- Amy Beach (1867–1944) set Teasdale's poem "Dusk in June" to music.
- Amy Aldrich Worth (1888–1967) set Teasdale's poem "Pierrot's Song" to music.
- Dagmar de Corval Rybner (1890–1965) used Teasdale's poems for her songs "Pastorale", "Pierrot", and "Swans".
- In 1932, Mildred Lund Tyson set Teasdale's poem "Like Barley Bending" to music.
- In 1937, the poet Orrick Glenday Johns wrote of her death in his book, "Time of Our Lives: The Story of My Father and Myself".
- In 1967 Tom Rapp and the group Pearls Before Swine recorded a musical rendition of "I Shall Not Care" on their first album One Nation Underground.
- In 1994, she was inducted into the St. Louis Walk of Fame.
- Teasdale's poem "There Will Be Rest" has been set to music under multiple titles by different choral composers. In 2004, Craig Hella Johnson and Frank Ticheli composed "There Will Be Rest" for the Conspirare choral ensemble. In 2017, Z. Randall Stroope composed "And Sure Stars Shining". In 2017, Elaine Hagenberg set the poem to music with the title "The Music of Stillness".
- In 2008, "There Will Come Soft Rains" was included in Fallout 3 alongside Ray Bradbury's short story of the same name. The poem is recited by a robot who has survived the nuclear apocalypse.
- In 2010, Teasdale's works were for the first time published in Italy, translated by Silvio Raffo.
- In 2006, Phyllis Zimmerman composed "Four Settings of Poems by Sara Teasdale" for choir, which was recorded on CD.
- In 2011, Joseph Phibbs chose poems by Teasdale for his song-cycle From Shore to Shore, and the song "Pierrot", and in 2013-14 he returned to her texts for his six Moon Songs. He has also acknowledged her influence in his orchestral work Rivers to the Sea.
- In 1928 and 1931, respectively, Teasdale's poems "May Night" and "Dusk in June" were set to music by Marion Rogers Hickman.
- Tony Wright used the poem "There Will Come Soft Rains" as lyrics for a song of the same name. It was released as part of a double A side charity single for Help Musicians UK.
- In 2019, Andrea Ramsey set "Like Barley Bending" to music for her song ("The Rising").
- In 2022, Christopher Tin set several of Teasdale's poems to music as part of his album The Lost Birds.

== Works ==
- Sonnets to Duse and Other Poems (1907)
- Helen of Troy and Other Poems (1911)
- Rivers to the Sea (1915)
- Love Songs (1917)
- Flame and Shadow (1920)
- Dark of the Moon (1926)
- Stars To-night (1930)
- Strange Victory (1933)

== Translations ==
- Llegarán suaves lluvias. Antología bilingüe. Edición y traducción de Juan Carlos Villavicencio, con prólogo de Luz María Astudillo y epílogo de Kurt Folch. Descontexto Editores, Santiago de Chile, 2018. ISBN 978-956-9438-20-2
- Тисдейл С. Реки, текущие к морю: Избранные стихотворения (in Russian). – Moscow: 2011. – 192 pages. ISBN 978-5-91763-062-5
