= William Marion Reedy =

American journalist and editor (1862–1920)

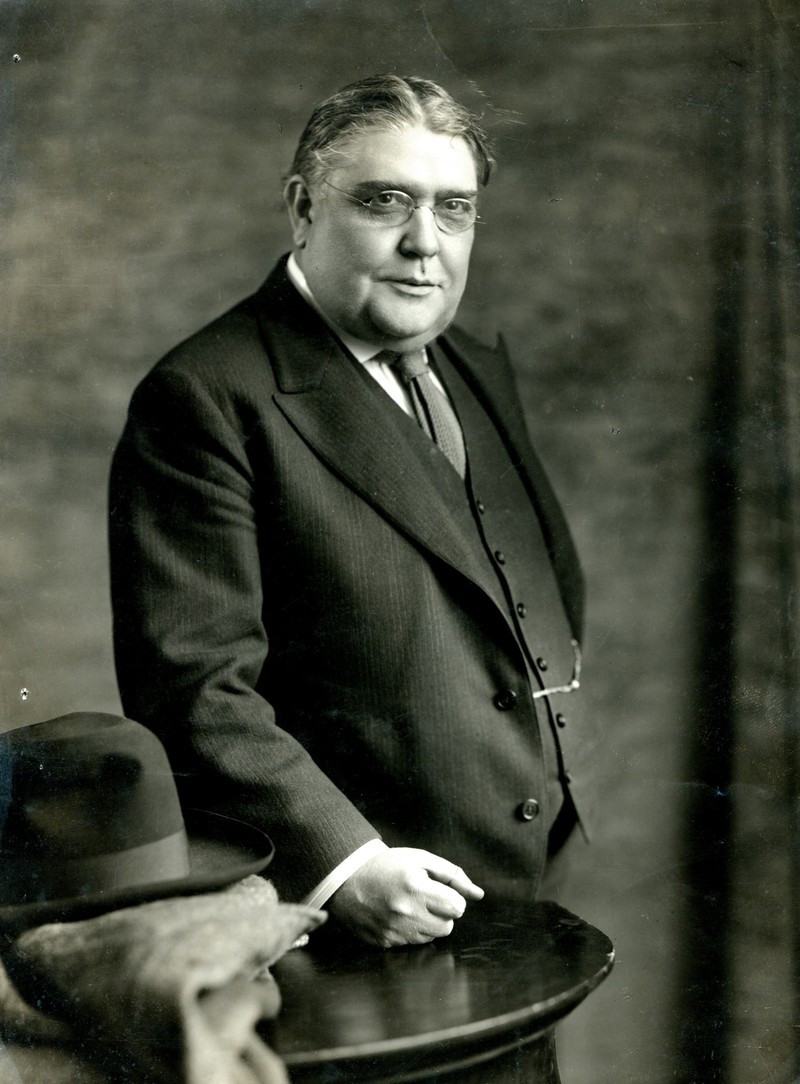
- Reedy in 1904
- Born: 1862; St. Louis, Missouri
- Died: July 28, 1920 (aged 58); San Francisco, California
- Education: St. Louis University
- Occupations: Editor, writer
- Writing career
- Language: English

William Marion Reedy (1862 – July 28, 1920) was a St. Louis–based editor best known for his promotion of the poets Sara Teasdale, Edgar Lee Masters, and Carl Sandburg to the audience of his newspaper, Reedy's Mirror. Politically, Reedy was a liberal Democrat and advocated Georgist economics.

== Biography ==
Reedy was born in St. Louis in 1862. He spent his childhood in Kerry Patch and later attended St. Louis University. He began his career as a writer's assistant at the Missouri Republican. He then worked for the St. Louis Globe-Democrat before starting his acclaimed tenure at the Mirror in 1893. He became owner of the Mirror, where he published the work of up-and-coming poets like Sandburg, Teasdale and Masters. Reedy had an eye for talented new writers, often publishing writers before they gained widespread recognition. He published Edgar Lee Masters' poetry in 1914, work that later formed the Spoon River Anthology. The poet and editor, Orrick Johns, wrote in Time of Our Lives that "Reedy was the only figure to give St. Louis a literary character in the eyes of the rest of the country between 1900 and 1920.

Reedy died unexpectedly in San Francisco on July 28, 1920.
