= Marshall Criser =

American lawyer

Marshall M. Criser, Jr.
- Born: September 4, 1928 (age 96); Rumson, New Jersey, U.S.
- Education: B.S., University of Florida, 1949; LL.B., University of Florida, 1951
- Occupation(s): Corporate Attorney; University President
- Employer(s): U.S. Army; Gunster, Yoakley & Stewart; University of Florida; Mahoney, Adams & Criser, P.A. McGuire Woods LLP
- Spouse: Paula Porcher Criser

Marshall McAllister Criser, Jr. (born September 4, 1928) is an American corporate lawyer and former university administrator. Criser is a native of New Jersey, and earned his bachelor's and law degrees before becoming a practicing attorney. He was the eighth president of the University of Florida, serving from 1984 to 1989.

== Early life and education ==
Criser was born in Rumson, New Jersey, the only child of a meat-cutter and grocer, Marshall Criser, Sr., and his wife, Louise Johnson. In 1941, his father sold his little grocery store and moved his family to West Palm Beach, Florida. After graduating from Palm Beach High School in Palm Beach in June 1946, Criser attended the University of Florida in Gainesville, Florida. He earned his way through his undergraduate studies as a construction worker and cafeteria cashier, while remaining an active member of various extracurricular organizations. Criser was president of Sigma Nu Fraternity (Epsilon Zeta chapter), student government, and the Florida Blue Key leadership honorary society, in addition to being a senior officer in the Reserve Officers Training Corps (ROTC), the business manager of the Seminole yearbook, and homecoming chairman. He was also inducted into the University of Florida Hall of Fame. Criser graduated from the university's College of Business Administration with a Bachelor of Science degree in 1949, and from its College of Law with a Bachelor of Laws degree in 1951. After graduation from law school, he was commissioned as a first lieutenant in the U.S. Army and served two years of active duty before entering the private practice of law in Palm Beach County, Florida.

== Lawyer, regent, university president ==
Criser was a partner in the law firm of Gunster, Yoakley & Stewart in West Palm Beach, Florida for thirty-one years. He served as a member of the board of governors of The Florida Bar from 1960 to 1969 and as its president from 1968 to 1969, and was also a member of the American Bar Association House of delegates. He was two-term member of the Board of Regents of the State University System of Florida from 1971 to 1981, having been appointed by Governor Reubin Askew, and served as the chairman of the Board of Regents from 1974 to 1977. As chairman, Criser led the search committee that selected Robert Q. Marston as the new University of Florida president in 1974.

The Florida Board of Regents selected Criser to be the eighth president of the University of Florida in 1984. He was the University of Florida's second alumnus to serve as its president. His term as president is remembered for the enhancement of the university's instructional quality, the rapid rise of its admissions standards, the growth of its academic reputation, and its successful fund-raising among alumni and the business community. His administration successfully completed the process of the University of Florida's admission to the Association of American Universities (AAU), the leading association of North American research universities, in 1985, and forthrightly handled the football program's widespread violations of National Collegiate Athletic Association (NCAA) rules under coach Charley Pell that shocked the university community during the 1984–1985 academic year. As an experienced lawyer, he supervised the university's own investigation of its football program, disclosed the results to the NCAA, and implemented reforms to ensure the integrity of the university and future compliance with NCAA legislation. As UF president, he was vocal about infraction enforcement on the NCAA Presidents Commission stating, "the ultimate responsibility must be assumed by the CEOs because we don't have enough NCAA cops to solve all of the problems." Criser was responsible for initiating the university's first comprehensive capital campaign in the fall of 1988. When completed three years later, in 1991, the capital campaign had raised more than $390 million for the university's endowment. At the time, the capital campaign realized the third-highest total of private donations ever raised by an American state university.

For whatever time I am privileged to be president of this university, we will strive for excellence in academics and in our athletic programs. But, athletic programs at this university will operate for the benefit of this university. . . . The university will not be operated for the benefit of the athletic programs.

— Marshall Criser, on the firing of
Florida Gators football coach Charley Pell.

Criser advocated reducing class sizes to improve the quality of academic instruction, and proposed reducing undergraduate enrollment by 1,500 students while maintaining the size of the university faculty and budget. The next three entering freshman classes were to be reduced by 500 entering students each. He also made plans for raising the university's admissions standards and its upper division retention requirements, bolstering the academic counseling program, and rewarding faculty excellence in instruction, research and academic publishing. The lost income from the smaller entering classes, and the costs of the other academic enhancements, were to be offset by increased investment income resulting from the capital campaign's additions to the university endowment.

After resigning as the university president in 1989, Criser returned to the practice of law in Jacksonville, Florida, with the law firm of Mahoney, Adams & Criser, and its successor, McGuire Woods. When the Florida Legislature reorganized the governance system for the state's universities in 2001, Governor Jeb Bush appointed Criser as the founding chairman of the newly constituted board of trustees of the university. He served on the corporate board of directors of Barnett Bank, BellSouth, Florida Power & Light, Rinker Materials and Shands Hospital, and, at the request of Governor Bush, he later served as the chairman of Scripps Florida Funding Corp. He also served as a member of the NCAA Infractions Appeals Committee.

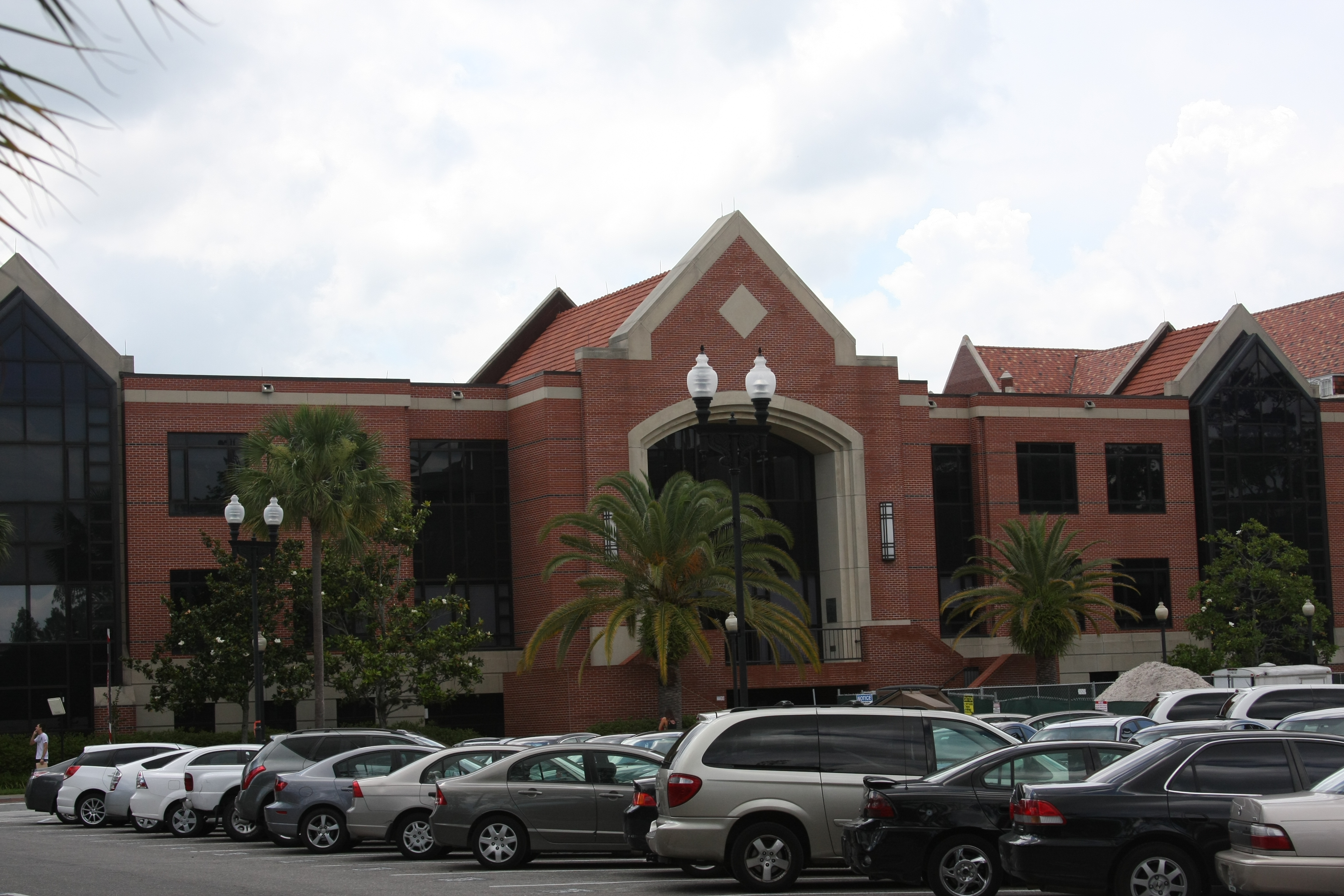
Eastern view of Marshall M. Criser Hall, principal student services building of the University of Florida.

== Legacy ==
The University of Florida named its new student administrative services building, Marshall M. Criser Hall, in honor of Criser in 1991. Criser Hall includes the Marshall Criser Student Services Center, the Office of Admissions, and the Registrar's Office. The University of Florida College of Law honored him with the endowed Marshall M. Criser Chair in Electronic Communications and Administrative Law.

In 2007, Criser and his wife Paula made a $1 million gift to Shands HealthCare to support the Shands at the University of Florida Cancer Hospital, a new $388-million treatment facility completed in 2009.

Criser and his wife are the parents of six children: Marshall M. "Casey" Criser, III, the president of AT&T Florida and a member of the University of Florida Board of Trustees, as well as Edward Criser, Mary Loveland, Glenn Criser, Mark Criser and Kimberly Criser.

On November 13, 2013, Criser's eldest son, Marshall Criser III, was selected as the next Chancellor of the State University System of Florida.

== See also ==
- History of the University of Florida
- List of Levin College of Law graduates
- List of Sigma Nu brothers
- List of University of Florida alumni
- List of University of Florida presidents

== Bibliography ==
- Pleasants, Julian M., Gator Tales: An Oral History of the University of Florida, University of Florida, Gainesville, Florida (2006). ISBN 0-8130-3054-4.
- Proctor, Samuel, & Wright Langley, Gator History: A Pictorial History of the University of Florida, South Star Publishing Company, Gainesville, Florida (1986). ISBN 0-938637-00-2.
- Van Ness, Carl, & Kevin McCarthy, Honoring the Past, Shaping the Future: The University of Florida, 1853–2003, University of Florida, Gainesville, Florida (2003).
