= Jack Katz =

Jack Katz may refer to:

- Jack Katz (businessman) (born c. 1941), American businessman
- Jack Katz (artist) (1927–2025), American comic book artist and writer, painter and art teacher
