= List of Sigma Nu members =

Sigma Nu is college fraternity founded at the Virginia Military Institute in 1869. Following is a list of notable members of the fraternity.

== Founders ==
Name	Original chapter	Notability	Ref.
James Frank Hopkins	Alpha	Co-founder of Sigma Nu Fraternity.	
Greenfield Quarles	Alpha	Co-founder of Sigma Nu Fraternity.	
James McIlvaine Riley	Alpha	Co-founder of Sigma Nu Fraternity; First Regent.	

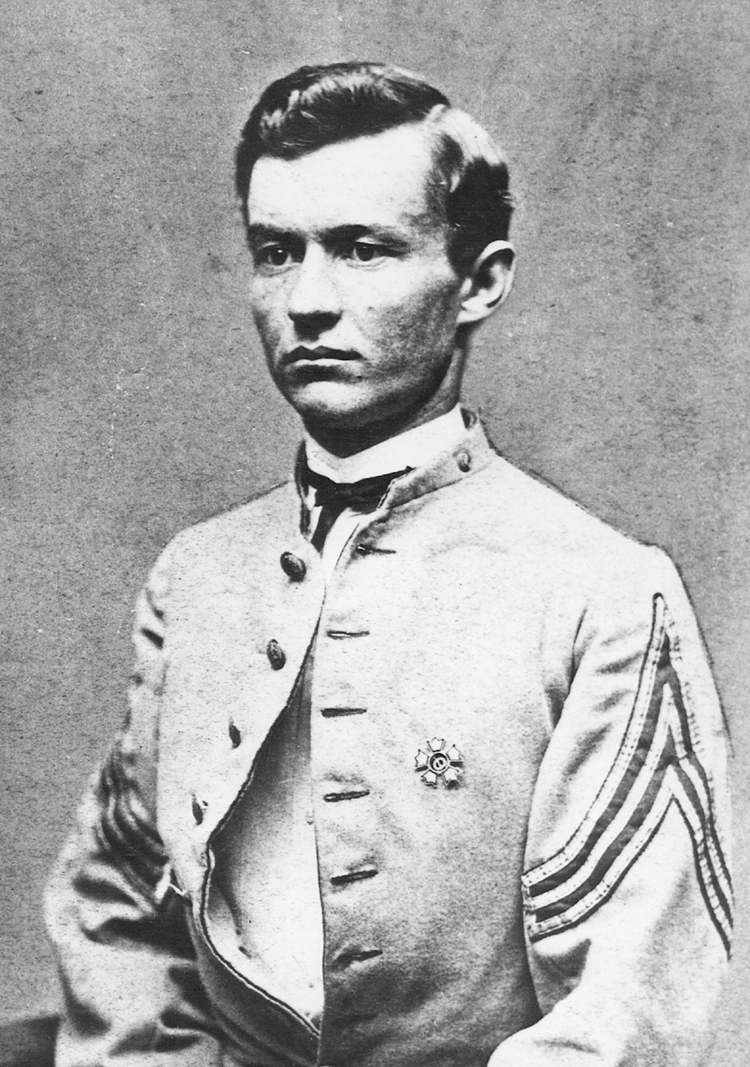
Greenfield Quarles

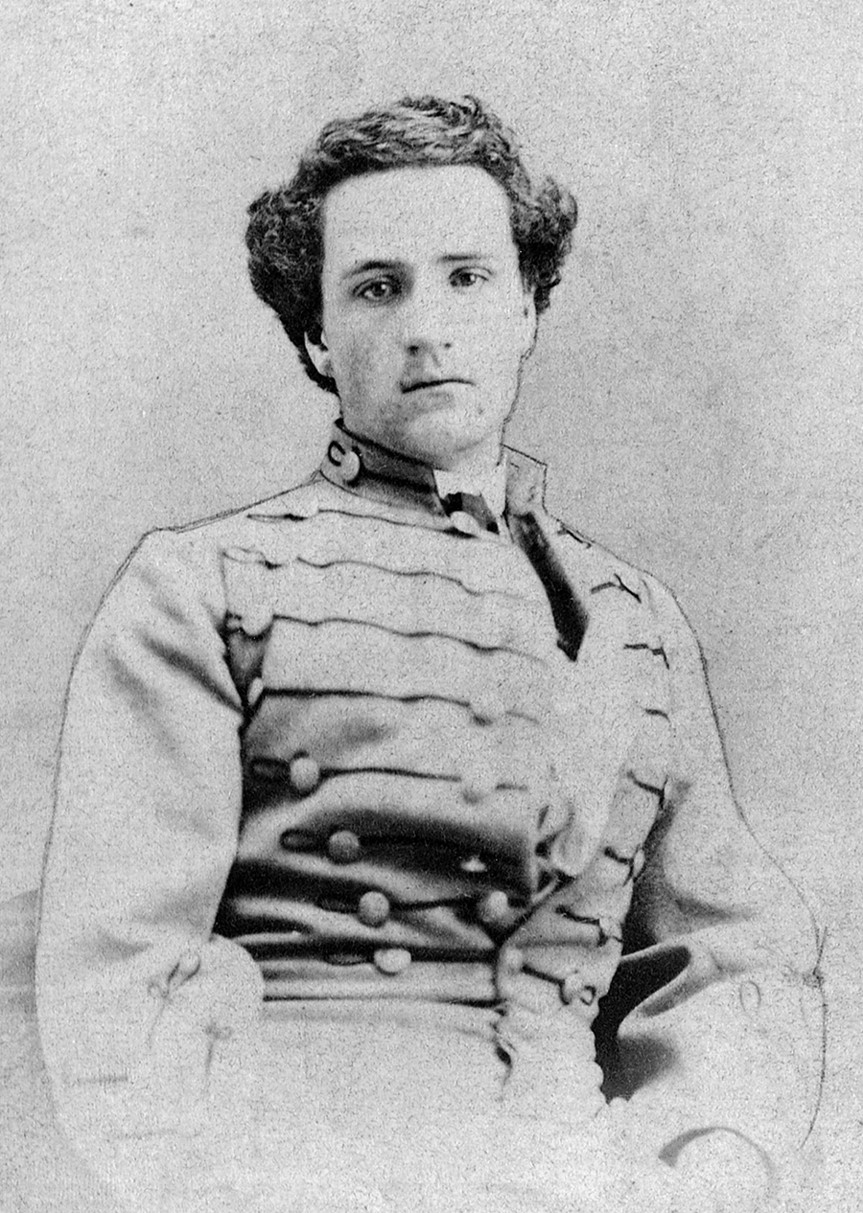
James McIlvaine Riley

== Business ==
Name	Original chapter	Notability	Ref.
Dan Amos	Mu	Chairman and chief executive officer of Aflac Incorporated.	
Gary Fayard	Theta	CEO and Executive Vice President of The Coca-Cola Company.	
Jack Katz	Epsilon Zeta	Chief Executive Officer and Founder of Panama Jack.	
Jason Kilar	Psi	Former CEO and Founder of Hulu, helped launch video and streaming service at Amazon	
Johnny Morris (businessman)	Epsilon Beta	Founder of Bass Pro Shops.	
Charles R. Schwab	Beta Chi	founder of the Charles Schwab Corporation.	
Kevin Systrom	Beta Chi	founder of Instagram.	
Don Tyson	Gamma Upsilon	President and CEO of Tyson Foods during its rise to the top of the food business.	
John Van Koert	Gamma Lambda	Artist, Silversmith and furniture designer for Drexel Funiture	

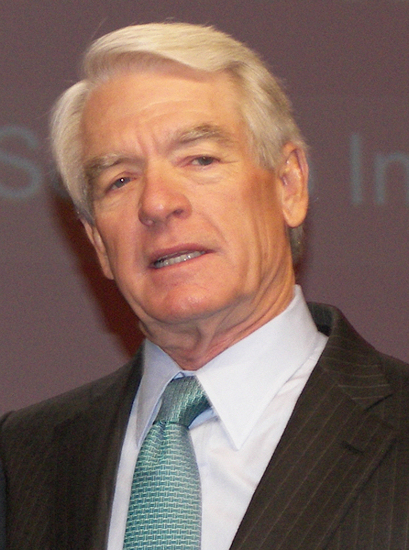
Charles R. Schwab

== Entertainment ==
Name	Original chapter	Notability	Ref.
Chip Arndt	Beta Alpha	Winner of The Amazing Race 4.	
Bob Barker	Epsilon Beta	Emmy-winning host of "The Price is Right" game show since 1972; has served as emcee for Miss Universe and Rose Parade	
Michael Biehn	Epsilon Alpha	American actor/director who is known for playing the role as Kyle Reese in James Cameron's The Terminator (1984). Also played roles in Aliens (film) (1986), The Abyss (1989), and Tombstone (film) (1993).	
David Birney	Delta Beta	Award-winning actor/director whose career has embraced a substantial list of performances in both contemporary and classical roles in theatre, film and television.	
Joe Buck	Beta Eta	American sportscaster and the son of sportscaster Jack Buck. He has won numerous Sports Emmy Awards for his play-by-play work with Fox Sports.	
James Carville	Phi	Political commentator and media personality who is a prominent figure in the Democratic Party. Carville was a co-host of CNN's former Crossfire opinion program.	
William Daniels	Gamma Beta	American actor and former president of the Screen Actors Guild (1999 to 2001). He is known for his performance as Dustin Hoffman's father in The Graduate (1967), as Howard in Two for the Road, as John Adams in 1776, as Carter Nash in Captain Nice, as Mr. George Feeny in ABC's Boy Meets World, as the voice of KITT in Knight Rider, and as Dr. Mark Craig in St. Elsewhere, for which he won two Emmy Awards.	
Vir Das	Delta Theta	Indian Bollywood actor and comedian.	
James Dean	Epsilon Pi	Cultural icon of teenage disillusionment, as expressed in the title of his most celebrated film, Rebel Without a Cause (1955), in which he starred as troubled Los Angeles teenager Jim Stark. The other two roles that defined his stardom were as loner Cal Trask in East of Eden (1955), and as the surly ranch hand, Jett Rink, in Giant (1956). Dean's enduring fame and popularity rests on his performances in only these three films, all leading roles. His premature death in a car crash cemented his legendary status.	
Adam Duritz	Zeta Xi	Musician. Lead singer for the Counting Crows	
Harrison Ford	Zeta Tau	Actor	
Dave Guard	Beta Chi	American folk singer, songwriter, arranger and recording artist. Along with Nick Reynolds and Bob Shane, he was one of the founding members of The Kingston Trio.	
Jon Hamm	Upsilon	American actor notable for his role as Donald Draper in the television program Mad Men.	
Jamey Johnson	Iota Lambda	Country Music Singer, co-writer of the CMA and ACM 2007 Song of the Year "Give It Away", recorded by George Strait	
Tom Johnson	Mu	American journalist and media executive, best known for serving as president of Cable News Network (CNN) during the 1990s and, before that, as publisher of the Los Angeles Times newspaper.	
Richard Lester	Beta Rho	American film director based in Britain, best known for his work with The Beatles and his work on the Superman film series. Movies directed by Lester include A Hard Day's Night, Help!, Superman 2, and The Three Musketeers.	
Curt Menefee	Beta Epsilon	American sportscaster who is the host of the Fox network's NFL show Fox NFL Sunday.	
Al Michaels	Zeta Upsilon Eta Kappa	American television sportscaster. Now employed by NBC Sports after nearly three decades (1977–2006) with ABC Sports, he is perhaps best known for his many years of calling play-by-play of National Football League games, including nearly two decades with Monday Night Football.	
Glenn Miller	Gamma Kappa	Leader of the Glenn Miller Orchestra, received the GRAMMY Hall of Fame Award in 1983 (In the Mood) and 1991 (Moonlight Serenade)	
Mike Posner	Gamma	American singer, songwriter, and producer.	
Tom Poston	Epsilon	American television and film actor.	
Paul Rudd	Nu	American actor, comedian, and screenwriter. He has primarily appeared in comedies, and is known for his roles in the films Anchorman: The Legend of Ron Burgundy (2004), The 40-Year-Old Virgin (2005), Knocked Up (2007), Forgetting Sarah Marshall (2008), I Love You, Man (2009), Dinner for Schmucks (2010), Our Idiot Brother (2011), The Perks of Being a Wallflower (2012), and This Is 40 (2012). Also a member of the Marvel Cinematic Universe, playing the role of Ant-Man in several movies.	
Josh Saviano	Beta Alpha	American lawyer and former actor who played Kevin Arnold's best friend, Paul Joshua Pfeiffer, in the comedy-drama television show The Wonder Years.	
Shadoe Stevens	Epsilon Kappa	American radio host, voiceover actor, and television personality. He was the host of American Top 40 from 1988 to 1995.	
Boyd Tinsley	Beta	American violinist and mandolinist who performs as a member of the Dave Matthews Band.	
Aaron Yoo	Beta Rho	American Actor. Starred in the 2007 film Disturbia and the 2008 film 21.	
Eli Young Band	Zeta Omicron	All members of this country music band are initiated members of Sigma Nu.	

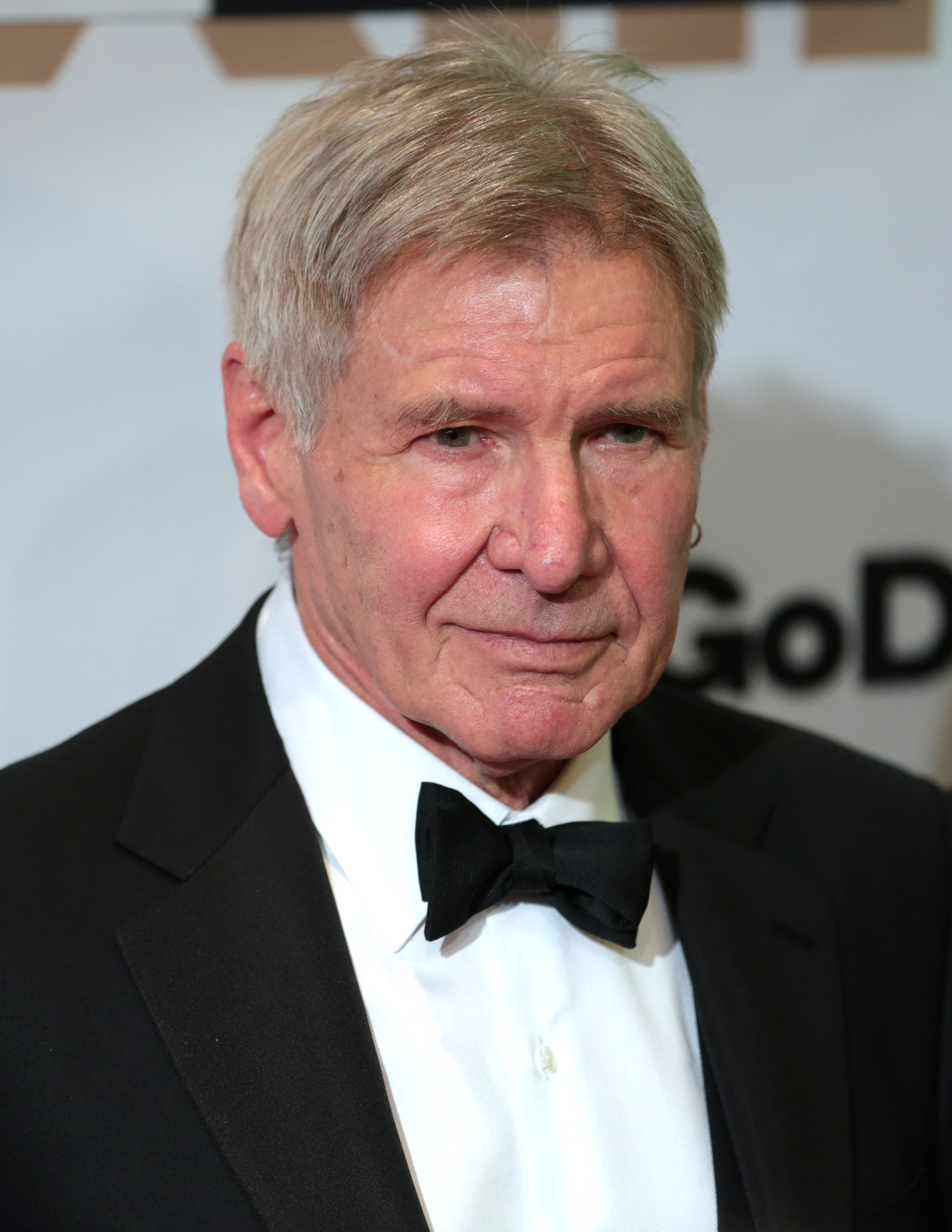
Harrison Ford in 2017

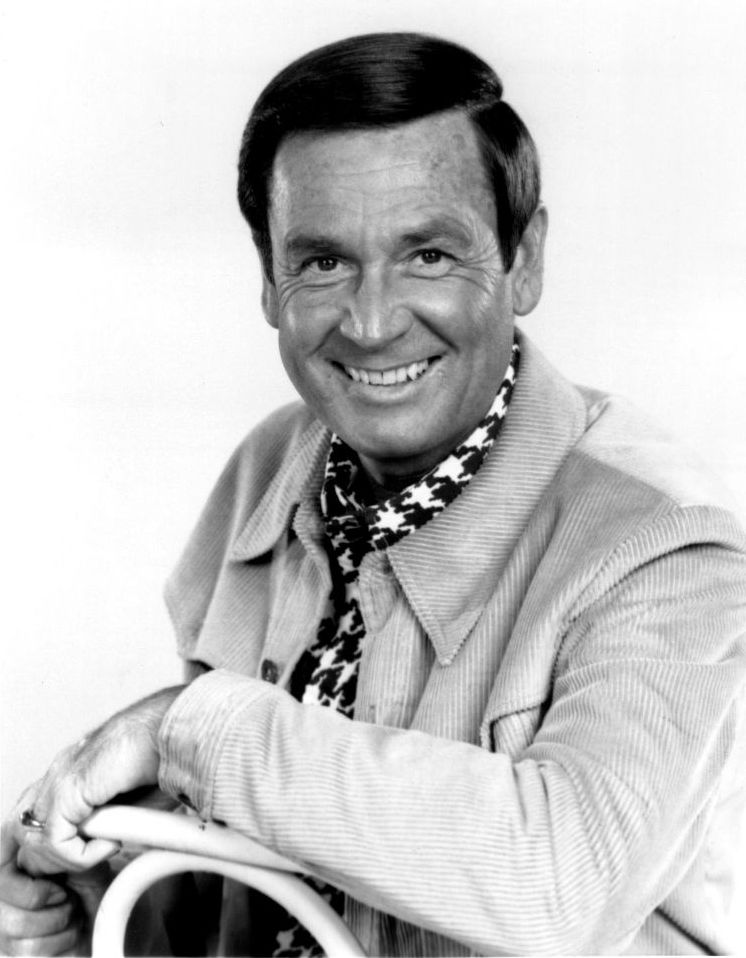
Bob Barker in 1975

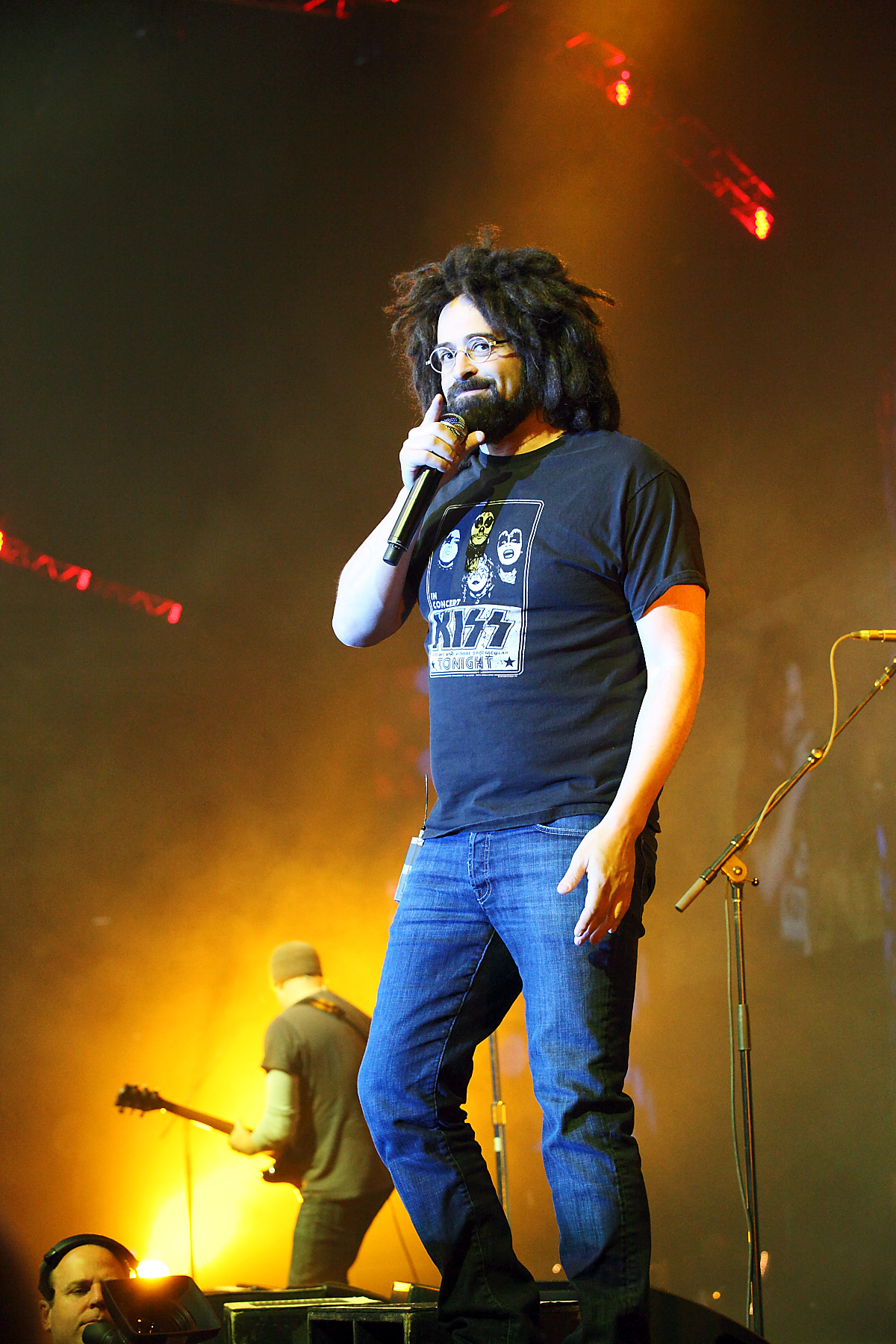
Adam Duritz in 2010

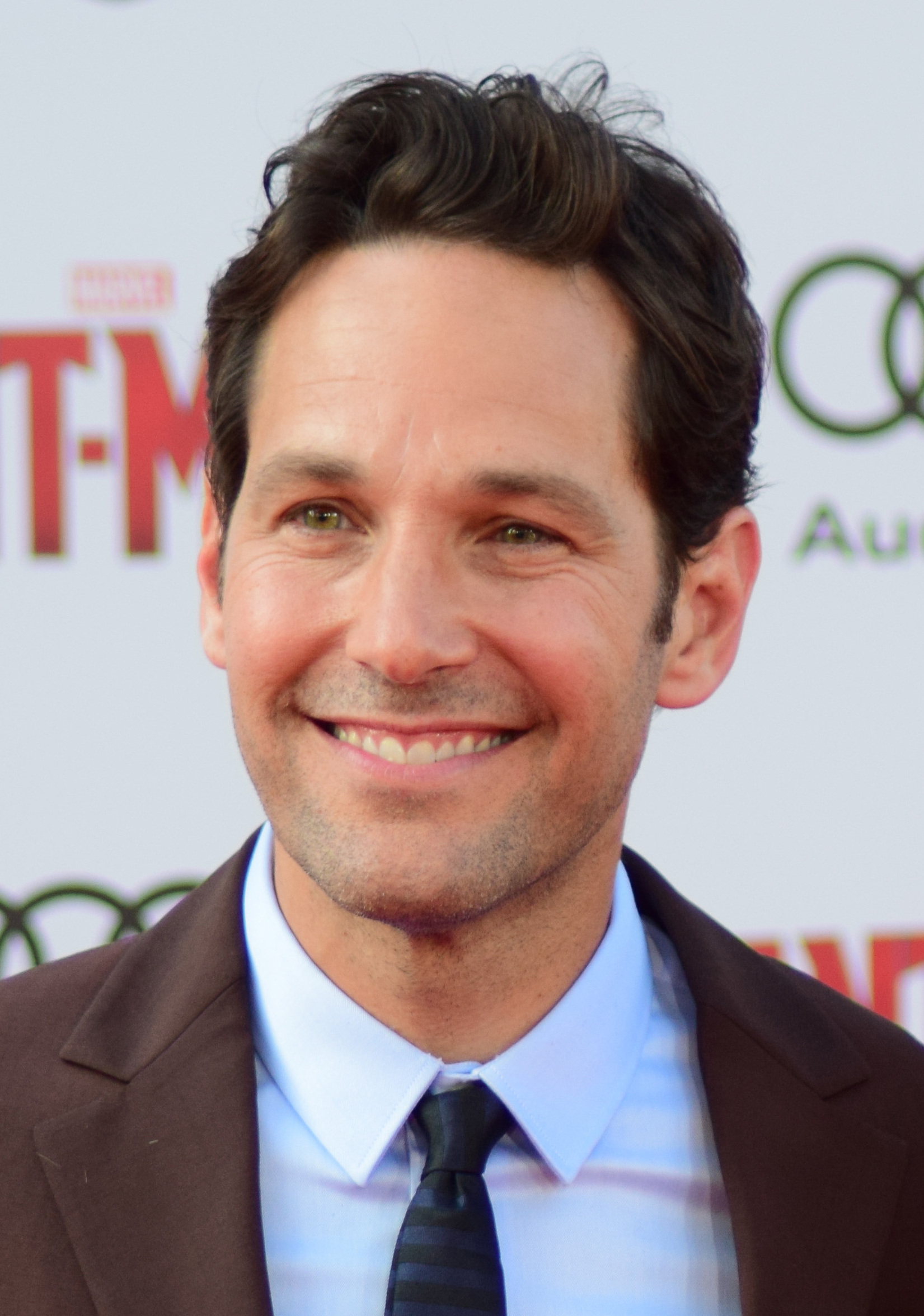
Paul Rudd in 2015

== Law ==
Name	Original chapter	Notability	Ref.
Merrill Kenneth Albert	Beta Psi	Celebrated Los Angeles trial lawyer, author, UC Berkeley All-Star tennis player.	
John Badalamenti	Epsilon Zeta	United States district judge appointed by President Donald Trump in 2020.	
Robert L. Gernon	Nu	Kansas Supreme Court Justice 2003–2005	
Neal Katyal	Delta Beta	Acting Solicitor General of the United States during the Obama Administration.	

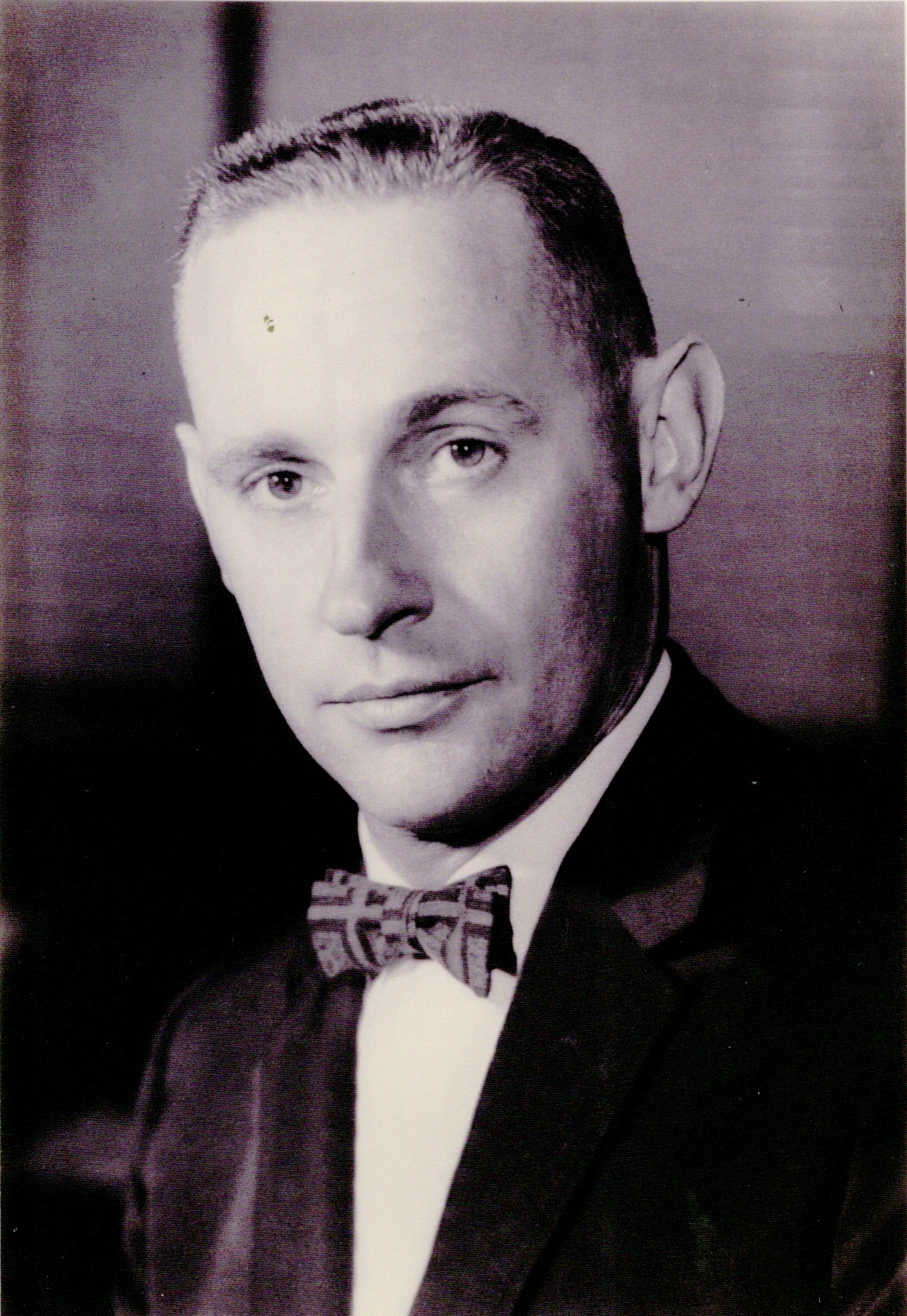
Merrill Albert

== Literature and journalism ==
Name	Original chapter	Notability	Ref.
Jeff Burlingame	Theta Lambda	American author and winner of a prestigious NAACP Image Award. He has won numerous other awards for his nonfiction books, the subjects of which include Gonzaga's first basketball coach and Olympian George Varnell, legendary Nirvana band musician Kurt Cobain, and a best-selling guide to the Olympic Peninsula and Olympic National Park.	
Zane Grey	Beta Rho	American author best known for his popular adventure novels and stories that presented an idealized image of the American frontier.	
William Inge	Nu	American playwright and novelist, whose works typically feature solitary protagonists encumbered with strained sexual relations. In the early 1950s, he had a string of memorable Broadway productions, and one of these, Picnic, earned him a Pulitzer Prize.	
Burton Rascoe	Gamma Rho	American journalist, editor and literary critic of the New York Herald Tribune.	

== Military ==
Name	Original chapter	Notability	Ref.
Donald Malarkey	Gamma Zeta	Former non-commissioned officer with Easy Company, 2nd Battalion, 506th Parachute Infantry Regiment, in the 101st Airborne Division of the United States Army during World War II. Malarkey was portrayed in the HBO miniseries Band of Brothers by Scott Grimes.	
General Paul Tibbets	Epsilon Zeta	brigadier general in the United States Air Force, best known for being the pilot of the Enola Gay (named for his mother), the first aircraft to drop an atomic bomb in the history of warfare. The bomb, code-named Little Boy, was dropped on the Japanese city of Hiroshima.	
Alvin Vogtle	Beta Theta	World War II pilot, inspiration for the POW character portrayed by Steve McQueen in the movie The Great Escape, VP of Alabama Power, CEO of Southern Company, namesake of Vogtle Electric Generating Plant.	

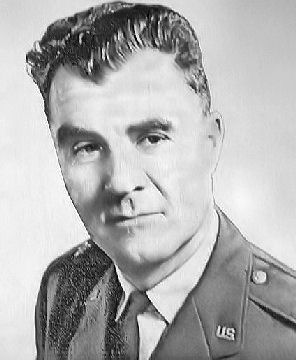
General Paul Tibbets

== Politician ==
Name	Original chapter	Notability	Ref.
Michael D. Antonovich	Eta Phi	Politician and the most senior-serving member of the Los Angeles County Board of Supervisors.	
Bill Baarsma	Zeta Alpha	Mayor of Tacoma, Washington from 2002 until 2009.	
Lloyd Bentsen	Upsilon	Four-term United States senator (1971–1993) from Texas and the Democratic Party nominee for Vice President in 1988 on the Michael Dukakis ticket. He also served in the House of Representatives from 1949 to 1955. In his later political life, he was Chairman of the Senate Finance Committee and the U.S. Treasury Secretary during the first two years of the Clinton administration.	
Quentin N. Burdick	Gamma Tau	American lawyer and politician. A member of the Democratic Party, he represented North Dakota in the U.S. House of Representatives (1959–1960) and the U.S. Senate (1960–1992). At the time of his death, he was the third longest-serving senator (after Strom Thurmond and Robert Byrd) among current members of the Senate.	
Alan Cranston	Beta Chi	American journalist and Democratic Senator from California.	
Tom Coburn	Epsilon Epsilon	United States Senator, medical doctor and Southern Baptist deacon. A member of the Republican Party, he was the junior senator from Oklahoma.	
Norman D. Dicks	Gamma Chi	U.S. Representative for Washington's 6th congressional district, serving between 1977 and 2013. He is a member of the Democratic Party.	
Oliver M. Gardner	Beta Tau	American politician. He served as the 57th governor of the U.S. state of North Carolina from 1929 to 1933. He was a member of the Democratic Party. In addition, Gardner remains the only person to ever captain both the NC State Wolfpack and North Carolina Tar Heels football teams.	
Walter F. George	Eta	American politician from the state of Georgia. He was a long-time Democratic United States Senator and was President pro tempore of the Senate from 1955 to 1957.	
Jim Gibbons	Delta Xi	American politician. He served as the 28th governor of the U.S. state of Nevada from 2007 to 2011. He is a former member of the United States House of Representatives, having served from 1997 to 2006. He is a member of the Republican Party.	
Bob Graham	Epsilon Zeta	American politician and author. He was the 38th governor of Florida from 1979 to 1987 and a United States Senator from that state from 1987 to 2005.	
Phil Gingrey	Gamma Alpha	American politician, member of the United States House of Representatives from Georgia since 2003.	
Clifford P. Hansen	Epsilon Delta	Republican politician from the American state of Wyoming. He served as both the 26th governor (1963–1967) and U.S. senator (1967–1978).	
Clarence M. Kelley	Nu	American public servant who served as the second Director of the Federal Bureau of Investigation.	
Malcolm Lafargue	Phi	U.S. Attorney for the United States District Court for the Western District of Louisiana from 1941 to 1950.	
Trent Lott	Epsilon Xi	Former Senator from Mississippi, former majority leader of the U.S. Senate.	
James A. McClure	Delta Omicron	American politician from the state of Idaho, most notably serving as a Republican in the U.S. Senate for three terms.	
George J. Mitchell	Delta Psi	Former majority leader in the U.S. Senate from Maine and known for his 2007 Mitchell Report.	
Jody Powell	Eta Gamma	White House Press Secretary during the presidency of Jimmy Carter. He later founded a public relations firm.	
E. Clay Shaw, Jr.	Delta Mu	American politician who was a Republican member of the United States House of Representatives from 1981 until 2007.	
Steve Symms	Delta Omicron	Four-term congressman (1973–81) and two-term U.S. Senator (1981–93) from Idaho. He was among the most conservative members of the Republican Party and is currently a partner at Parry, Romani, DeConcini & Symms, a lobbying firm in Washington, D.C.	
Eugene Talmadge	Mu	Former Governor of Georgia.	
Herman Talmadge	Mu	Former Governor of Georgia and United States Senator.	
Joe Trippi	Zeta Iota	Long-time American Democratic campaign worker and consultant. A mainstay in presidential politics, Trippi has worked on the presidential campaigns of Edward Kennedy, Walter Mondale, Gary Hart, Dick Gephardt, Jerry Brown and most recently John Edwards. Most notably, he served as campaign manager for presidential candidate and former Vermont governor Howard Dean.	
Roger Wicker	Epsilon Xi	Junior Senator from Mississippi, former U.S. Representative from Mississippi.	

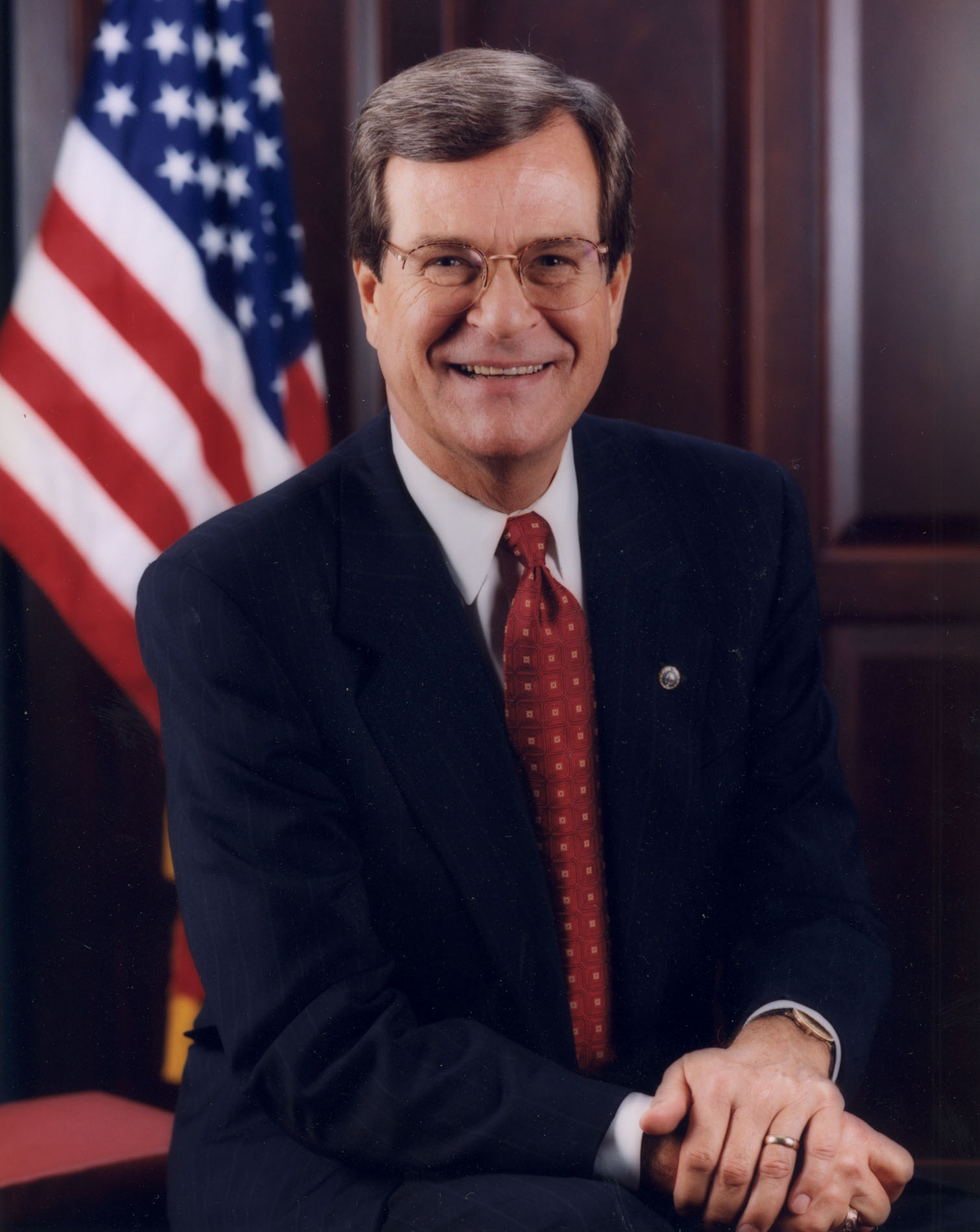
Trent Lott official portrait

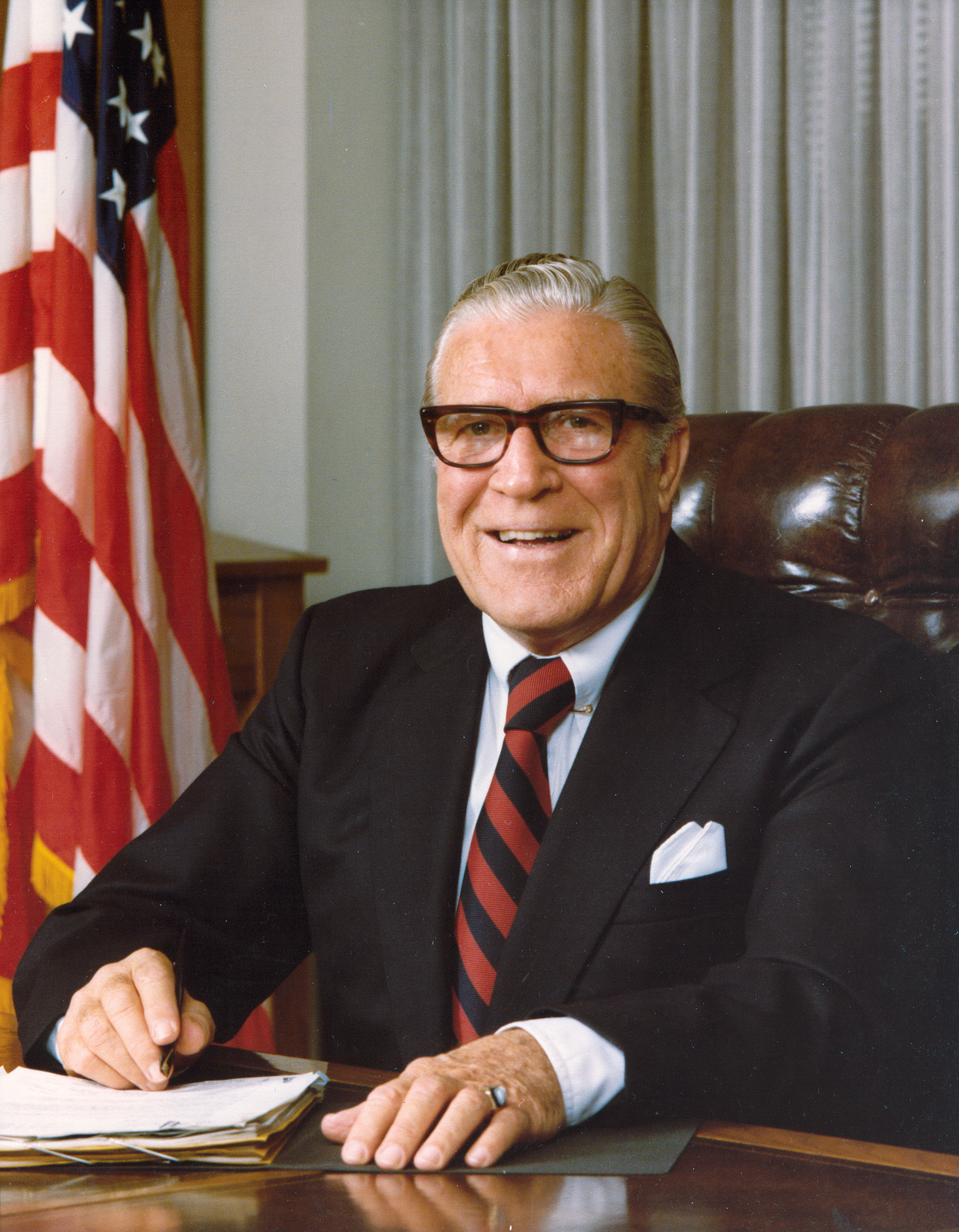
Clarence M. Kelley official portrait

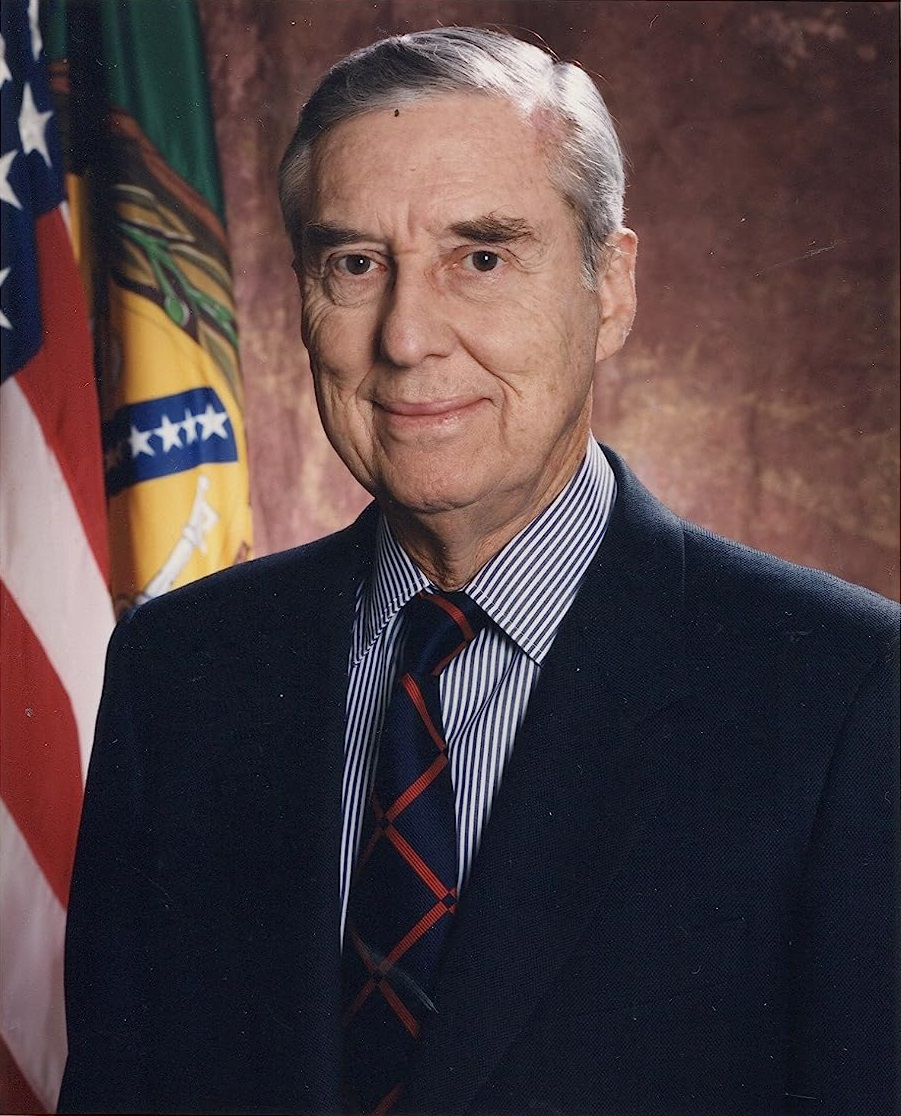
Lloyd Bentsen official portrait

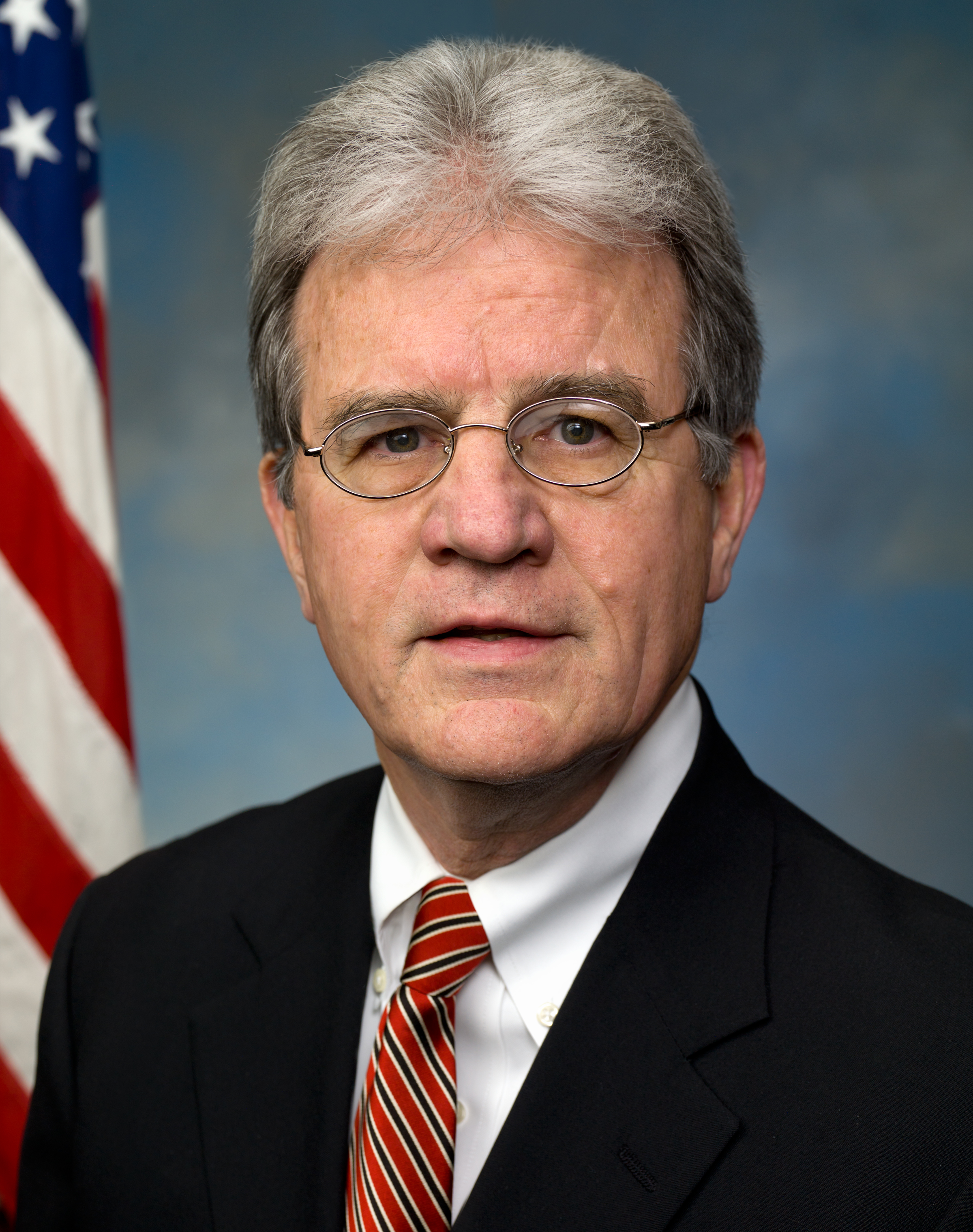
Tom Coburn official portrait

== Science ==
Name	Original chapter	Notability	Ref.
Vance D. Brand	Gamma Kappa	Former test pilot and NASA astronaut. He served as command module pilot during the first U.S.-Soviet joint space flight in 1975, and as commander of three space shuttle missions.	
Ronald Evans	Nu	NASA astronaut and one of only 24 people to have flown to the Moon.	

== Sports ==
Name	Original chapter	Notability	Ref.
Felix "Doc" Blanchard	Psi	Three time All-American and 1945 Heisman trophy winner for Army (after joining Sigma Nu at UNC)	
Paul "Bear" Bryant	Theta	Coached several college football teams (most notably, his alma mater Alabama) for a career record of 323-85-17	
Babe Clark	Nu	Former collegiate and professional football player.	
Carl L. Clemans	Beta Chi	Pioneer Class of Stanford University, first captain of its football team, and winning touchdowns in the first Big Game with University of California, Berkeley.	
Cedric Dempsey	Gamma Gamma	Sports administrator who became the third executive director of the National Collegiate Athletic Association from 1994 to 2003.	
Bobby Dodd	Epsilon Eta	American college football coach at Georgia Tech. He was elected to the College Football Hall of Fame as a player and coach, something that only three people have accomplished.	
Walt Dropo	Epsilon Phi	American college basketball standout and a professional baseball first baseman. During a 13-year career in Major League Baseball, he played for the Boston Red Sox (1949–1952), Detroit Tigers (1952–1954), Chicago White Sox (1955–1958), Cincinnati Redlegs (1958–1959) and Baltimore Orioles (1959–1961).	
Dallas Green	Delta Kappa	pitcher, manager, and executive in Major League Baseball.	
Al Groh	Beta	Two-time Atlantic Coast Conference Coach of the Year, winning the award in 2002 and 2007. Groh has over 38 years of professional and collegiate coaching experience; this history includes 13 seasons in the NFL, a Super Bowl title with the New York Giants, and over a decade of working under coach Bill Parcells.	
John Hadl	Nu	Former collegiate and professional football player.	
Ray Ewry	Beta Zeta	Eight Time Olympic Gold Medalist and one of the greatest standing jumpers of the early Olympic era	
Dick Howser	Zeta Zeta	American Major League Baseball shortstop, coach and manager. He is best known as the manager of the Kansas City Royals during the 1980s, and for guiding them to a World Series title in 1985.	
Lindy Infante	Epsilon Zeta	Played college football for the University of Florida, and later served as the head coach of the Jacksonville Bulls of the USFL, and the Green Bay Packers and the Indianapolis Colts of the NFL.	
Chet Jastremski	Beta Eta	American former competition swimmer, Olympic medalist, and former world record-holder.	
Hayes Alan Jenkins	Gamma Beta	American figure skater, led men's skating for 4 years, 1953–56. He won four consecutive World Figure Skating Championships from 1953 to 1956. He also won the gold medal in the 1956 Winter Olympics, after placing 4th in the 1952 Winter Olympics.	
Norm Johnson	Epsilon Pi	Former professional American football placekicker who played for 18 seasons in the National Football League. During that time, he played for the Seattle Seahawks (1982–1990), Atlanta Falcons (1991–1994), Pittsburgh Steelers (1995–1998), and the Philadelphia Eagles (1999). Johnson finished his 18 NFL seasons with 366 of 477 field goals (76%) and 638 of 644 extra points (99%), giving him a total of 1,736 points. As of 2010, he ranks tenth on the NFL's list of all time leading scorers, earning him the enduring nickname "Mr. Automatic" received during his tenure with the Seattle Seahawks.	
Stan Jones	Delta Phi	American football guard and defensive tackle in the National Football League for the Chicago Bears and the Washington Redskins. He was inducted into the Pro Football Hall of Fame in 1991. Jones is credited as the first professional player to use weight training to improve his conditioning for football.	
Ken Kendrick	Gamma Pi	Part-owner and managing partner of the Arizona Diamondbacks. Kendrick is the owner of the ultra-rare T-206 Honus Wagner baseball card.	
Guy Lewis	Zeta Chi	Former NCAA basketball coach who led the University of Houston Cougars program for 30 years from 1956 to 1986.	
Archie Manning	Epsilon Xi	Former NFL quarterback.	
Eli Manning	Epsilon Xi	Former quarterback for the New York Giants	
Mike McCormack	Nu	American football player and coach in the National Football League. He played with the Cleveland Browns from 1954–1962 and served as head coach of the Philadelphia Eagles, the Baltimore Colts and the Seattle Seahawks. He was elected to the Pro Football Hall of Fame in 1984.	
Wayne Munn	Delta Eta	World Heavyweight Wrestling Champion in 1925	
Rick Neuheisel	Epsilon Pi	TV football analyst, former American football coach, former player, and attorney. He was most recently the head coach at UCLA, his alma mater, from 2008 to 2011. Prior to UCLA, Neuheisel was the head coach at Colorado from 1995 to 1998 and Washington from 1999 to 2002. From 2005 to 2007, he was an assistant coach with the NFL's Baltimore Ravens, as quarterbacks coach for two seasons and offensive coordinator for one.	
Whitey Ock	Pi	Player for the 1935 Brooklyn Dodgers and captain of the 1934 Lehigh Engineers football team.	
David Paulson	Gamma Zeta	Former Tight-End for the San Diego Chargers and Pittsburgh Steelers.	
Pat Riley	Gamma Iota	American professional basketball executive.	
Bill Stanfill	Mu	Former defensive end for the Miami Dolphins of the American Football League and then the NFL after the AFL–NFL merger of 1970.	
Steve Stenstrom	Beta Chi	Former professional American football quarterback. Played for the Kansas City Chiefs, the Chicago Bears, the San Francisco 49ers, the Detroit Lions, and the Denver Broncos from 1995 to 2001. He started several games for the Bears during the 1998 season, as well as many games for the 49ers during the 1999 season after Steve Young's career-ending injury.	
Greg Swindell	Upsilon	American former Major League Baseball player, who had a 17-year career as a left-handed pitcher from 1986 to 2002. He played for the Cleveland Indians, Minnesota Twins and Boston Red Sox of the American League and the Cincinnati Reds, Houston Astros and Arizona Diamondbacks of the National League.	
Tommy Vardell	Beta Chi	Former professional American football fullback in the National Football League.	
Bob Wolff	Gamma	Sportscaster.	
Bill Yoast	Eta	Former assistant football coach for T.C. Williams High School, subject of the 2000 movie Remember the Titans.	

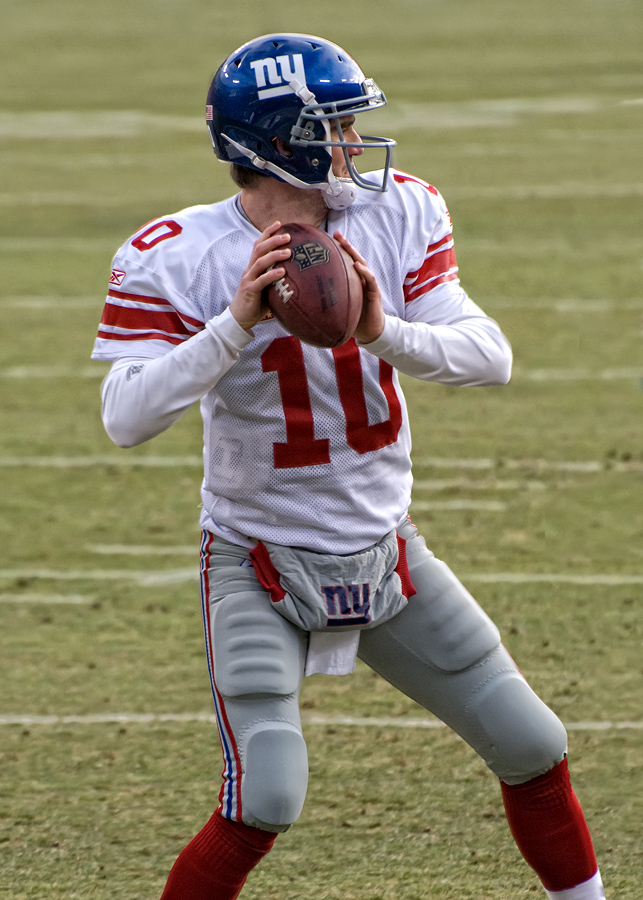
Eli Manning in 2012

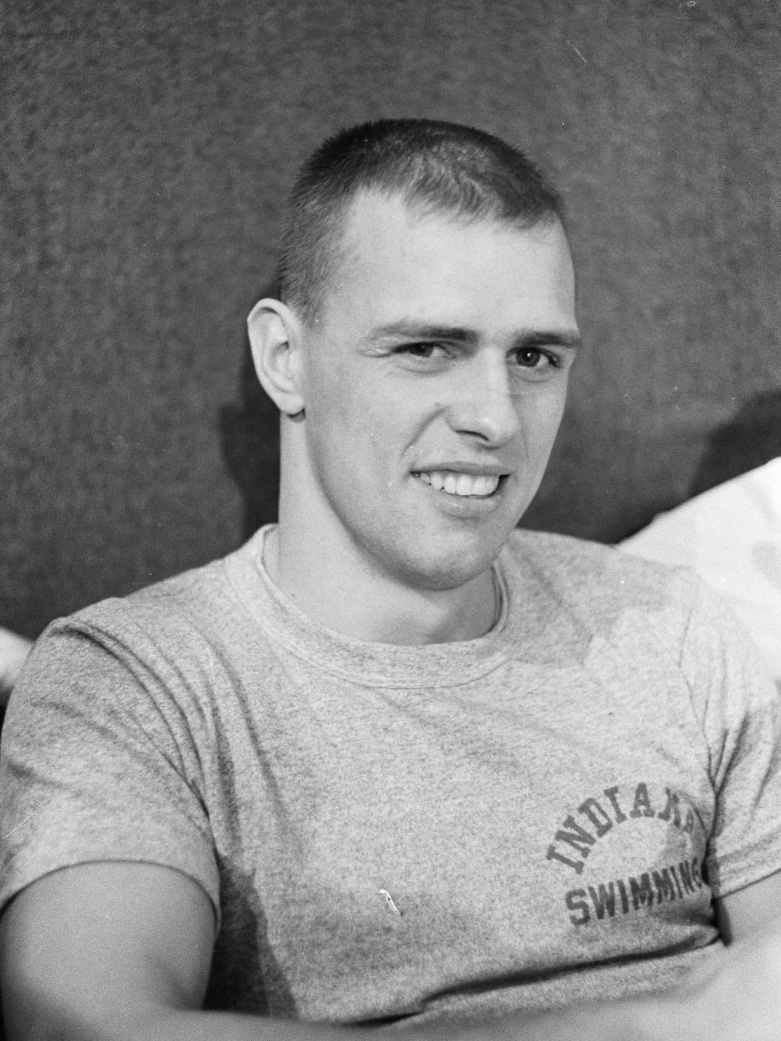
Chet Jastremski, in 1963

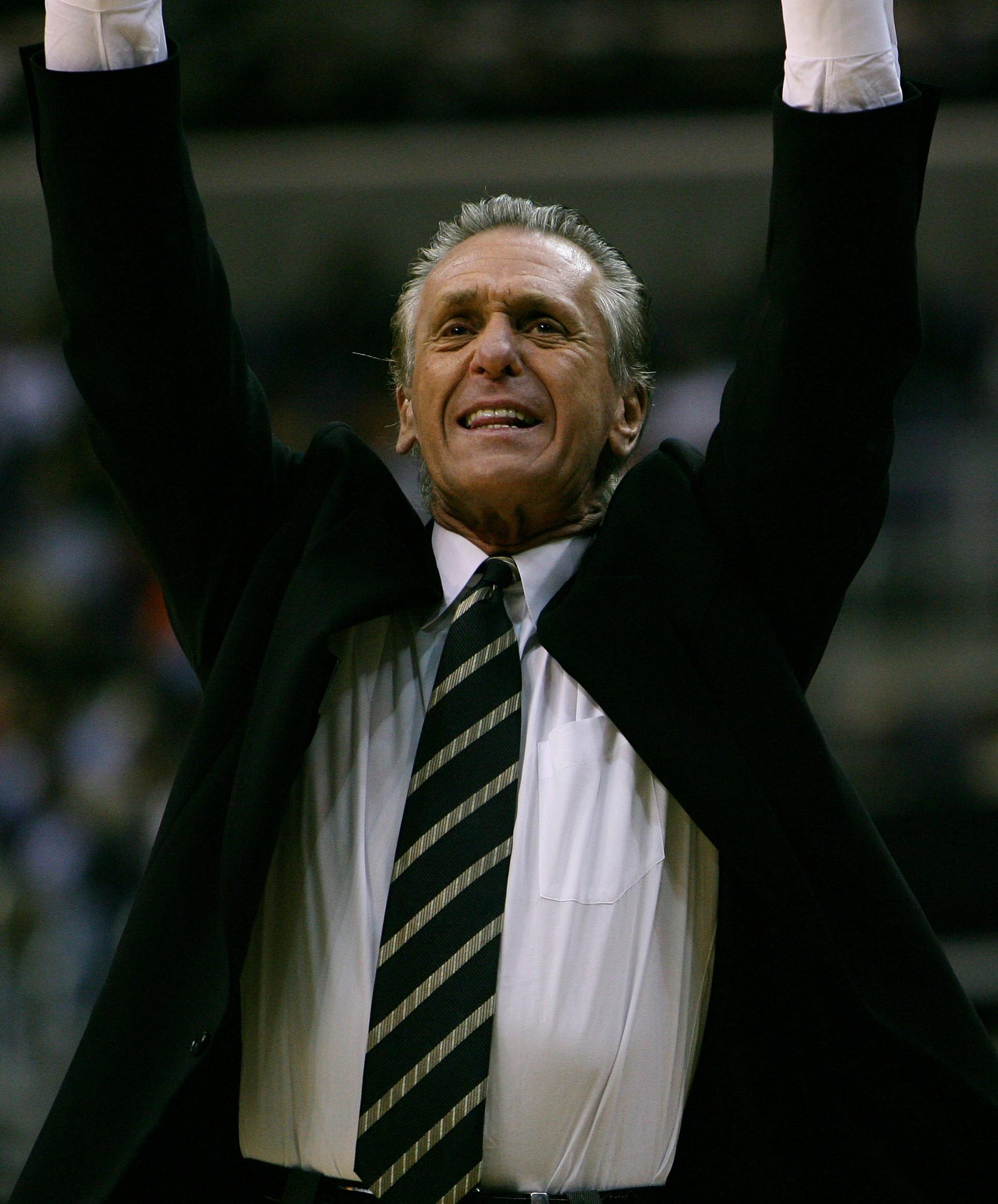
Pat Riley

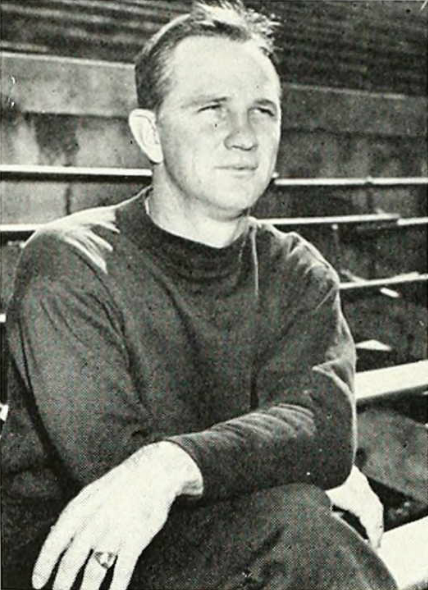
Bobby Dodd in 1943

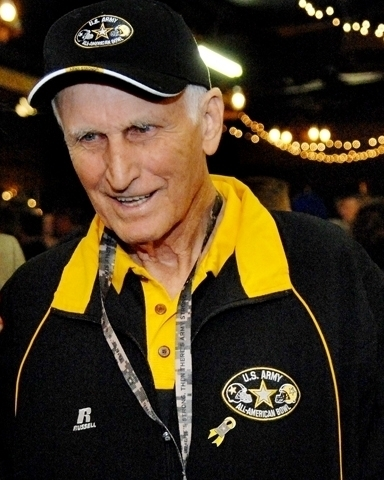
Bill Yoast
