= Lindy Infante =

American football player and coach (1940–2015)

No. 25
- Position: Halfback

Personal information
- Born: March 27, 1940; Miami, Florida, U.S.
- Died: October 8, 2015 (aged 75); St. Augustine, Florida, U.S.
- Listed height: 5 ft 11 in (1.80 m)
- Listed weight: 185 lb (84 kg)

Career information
- High school: Miami Senior (FL)
- College: Florida
- NFL draft: 1963: 12th round, 163rd overall pick
- AFL draft: 1963: 11th round, 81st overall pick

Career history

Playing
- Hamilton Tiger-Cats (1963)

Coaching
- Miami HS (1965) Assistant coach; Florida (1966–1971) Assistant; Memphis State (1972–1974) Offensive coordinator; Charlotte Hornets (1975) Assistant coach; Tulane (1976) Offensive coordinator; New York Giants (1977–1978) Wide receivers coach; Tulane (1979) Offensive coordinator; Cincinnati Bengals (1980) Quarterbacks coach; Cincinnati Bengals (1981–1982) Offensive coordinator; Jacksonville Bulls (1984-1985) Head coach; Cleveland Browns (1986–1987) Offensive coordinator; Green Bay Packers (1988–1991) Head coach; Indianapolis Colts (1995) Offensive coordinator; Indianapolis Colts (1996–1997) Head coach

Awards and highlights
- NFL Coach of the Year (1989); UF Athletic Hall of Fame; Florida–Georgia Hall of Fame

Head coaching record
- Regular season: NFL: 36–60 (.375); USFL: 15–21 (.417)
- Postseason: NFL: 0–1 (.000)
- Career: NFL: 36–61 (.371); USFL: 15–21 (.417)
- Coaching profile at Pro Football Reference

Gelindo "Lindy" Infante (March 27, 1940 – October 8, 2015) was an American football player and coach, who became an offensive coordinator and head coach in both the National Football League (NFL) and the United States Football League (USFL). Infante played college football for the University of Florida, and later served as the head coach of the Jacksonville Bulls of the USFL, and the Green Bay Packers and Indianapolis Colts of the NFL.

== Early life ==
Infante was born in Miami, Florida in 1940. He attended Miami Senior High School, where he was the star fullback for the Miami Stingarees.

== College career ==
Infante accepted an athletic scholarship to attend the University of Florida in Gainesville, Florida, and he played tailback for coach Ray Graves' Florida Gators football team from 1960 to 1962. He was also a member of Sigma Nu fraternity (Epsilon Zeta Chapter) while he was an undergraduate. Memorably, Infante scored the go-ahead touchdown in the Gators' 18–17 upset of the Georgia Tech Yellow Jackets in 1960, scored three touchdowns in their 21–7 victory over the Clemson Tigers in 1961, and was a senior team captain and a third-team All-Southeastern Conference (SEC) selection in 1962. During his undergraduate playing days, he also suffered two severe injuries: a ruptured lung against the LSU Tigers in 1960, and a season-ending broken leg against LSU in 1962.

Infante graduated from the University of Florida with a bachelor's degree in physical education in 1964, and he was later inducted into the University of Florida Athletic Hall of Fame as a "Distinguished Letter Winner" in 1988.

Infante returned to his alma mater in 1966, where he worked as an assistant football coach under head coaches Graves and Doug Dickey until 1971, and was responsible for recruiting Gator wide receiver Carlos Alvarez. He went on to serve as the offensive coordinator at Memphis State from 1972 to 1974.

== NFL assistant and coordinator ==
Infante was the offensive coordinator of the Cincinnati Bengals in the early 1980s under Forrest Gregg. His offense, quarterbacked by Ken Anderson, led the Bengals to the 1981 AFC title, and a berth in Super Bowl XVI. During the summer of 1983, he was offered and accepted the head coach position for the upstart Jacksonville Bulls; citing potentially divided loyalties, the Bengals management promptly fired him before the start of the 1983 NFL fall season. Infante served as the Bulls' head coach during their two spring football seasons in 1984 and 1985. After the 1985 season, the Bulls planned to merge with the Denver Gold and take the Gold's Mouse Davis as head coach; the USFL would never play the 1986 season. As Infante had left the USFL months ahead of its cessation, he was able to secure work in fall 1986, unlike most of the league's other coaches. He became the offensive coordinator of the Bernie Kosar-quarterbacked Cleveland Browns during the 1986 and 1987 NFL fall seasons. Under Infante, the 1987 Browns were the second-highest-scoring offense in the AFC.

== Green Bay Packers ==
In 1988, Infante became an NFL head coach for the first time, leaving Cleveland to replace Forrest Gregg as head coach of the Green Bay Packers. That first season, the Packers endured losing streaks of five and seven games and finished with a 4–12 record. Infante's second season, 1989, was his most successful; after a slow start, the Packers won five of their last six games, finishing 10–6, only missing the playoffs on a tie-breaker with the rival Minnesota Vikings. For his efforts, Infante was named the 1989 AP NFL Coach of the Year. In 1990, the Packers started 6–5, only to lose their final five games and finish 6–10 and out of the playoffs. That five-game losing streak continued into 1991, when the Packers lost six of their first seven games, and finished 4–12. A 27–7 season-ending victory over the Vikings notwithstanding, Infante was fired by the Packers' new general manager, Ron Wolf, before the beginning of the 1992 season. He was succeeded by Mike Holmgren, then the offensive coordinator of the San Francisco 49ers.

== Indianapolis Colts ==
A second opportunity to be a head coach in the NFL came in 1996, when Infante replaced the fired Ted Marchibroda as head coach of the Indianapolis Colts, who had reached the AFC title game in 1995. The season opened with great success, as the Colts started 5–1, but a four-game losing streak in the heart of the season ended their chances at an AFC East division title. Although they qualified for the playoffs as a wild card team, the Colts had to play the Pittsburgh Steelers in Pittsburgh in the wild card playoff game. Although the Colts led 14–13 at the half, a second half collapse allowed the Steelers to claim a 42–14 victory. It was Infante's only NFL playoff game; Indianapolis lost their first ten games of the 1997 season, finishing 3–13. Infante was fired shortly after the season's end.

As an NFL head coach, Infante compiled a career record of 36–60, with an 0–1 record in the playoffs.

== Head coaching record ==
NFL

Team	Year	Regular Season					Postseason			
Team	Year	Won	Lost	Ties	Win %	Finish	Won	Lost	Win %	Result
GB	1988	4	12	0	.250	5th in NFC Central	–	–	–	–
GB	1989	10	6	0	.625	2nd in NFC Central	–	–	–	–
GB	1990	6	10	0	.375	4th in NFC Central	–	–	–	–
GB	1991	4	12	0	.250	4th in NFC Central	–	–	–	–
GB total		24	40	0	.375		–	–	–	
IND	1996	9	7	0	.563	3rd in AFC East	0	1	.000	Lost to Pittsburgh Steelers in AFC wild card game
IND	1997	3	13	0	.188	5th in AFC East	–	–	–	–
IND total		12	20	0	.375		0	1	.000	
Total		36	60	0	.375		0	1	.000	

USFL

Team	Year	Regular Season					Postseason			
Team	Year	Won	Lost	Ties	Win %	Finish	Won	Lost	Win %	Result
JAC	1984	6	12	0	.333	5th in EC Southern	–	–	–	–
JAC	1985	9	9	0	.500	6th in Eastern Conference	–	–	–	–
JAC Total		15	21	0	.417		–	–	–	

== Life after football ==
After his retirement, Infante lived in Crescent Beach, Florida with his wife Stephanie, two sons and five grandchildren. He died in St. Augustine, Florida on October 8, 2015, aged 75.

== Players who became head coaches ==
Players who played for Infante who later became college or NFL head coaches

- Jim Harbaugh: San Diego (2004–2006), Stanford (2007–2010), San Francisco 49ers (2011–2014), Michigan (2015–2023), Los Angeles Chargers (2024-Present)
- Vance Joseph: Denver Broncos (2017–2018)

== See also ==
- List of Sigma Nu brothers
- List of University of Florida alumni
- List of University of Florida Athletic Hall of Fame members
