= Fayard (disambiguation) =

Fayard is a French Paris-based publishing house established in 1857.

Fayard may also refer to:

== People ==
=== Given name ===
- Fayard Nicholas (1914–2006), American choreographer, dancer and actor; best known as one of the Nicholas Brothers

=== Surname ===
- Gary Fayard (born 1953), American business executive with The Coca-Cola Company
- Jean Fayard (1902–1978), French writer and journalist
- Juline Fayard (born 2003), French tennis player
- Sébastien Fournet-Fayard (born 1985), French road cyclist

== Other uses ==
- Le Juge Fayard dit Le Shériff ("Judge Fayard, called The Sheriff"), a 1977 French crime film
- Fayard Hall, a building at Southeastern Louisiana University in Hammond, Louisiana, U.S.
