= Jack Katz (businessman) =

- Born: 1941 (age 84–85)
- Education: B.A, University of Florida, 1965
- Known for: Founding Panama Jack; Florida Gators football player

Jack Katz (born c. 1941) is an American businessman and the founder and chief executive officer of the Panama Jack Company.

Katz attended The Citadel in Charleston, SC and played football for the Bulldogs before transferring to the University of Florida in Gainesville, Florida, where he was a lineman for coach Ray Graves' Florida Gators football team from 1962 to 1964. He was a starting defensive lineman for the Gators, and was one of the heroes of the Gators' 10–6 upset of the Alabama Crimson Tide in Tuscaloosa in 1963. Katz was a third-team All-Southeastern Conference (SEC) selection in 1963. He was also President of Sigma Nu fraternity (Epsilon Zeta Chapter) at Florida.

Katz graduated from the University of Florida with a bachelor's degree in education in 1965, and was inducted into the University of Florida Athletic Hall of Fame as a "Distinguished Letter Winner" in 2008.

In 1974, Katz founded the Panama Jack Company, an international purveyor of suncare, beachwear and tropical lifestyle products.

== See also ==
- Florida Gators
- Florida Gators football, 1960–69
- List of Sigma Nu brothers
- List of University of Florida alumni
- List of University of Florida Athletic Hall of Fame members
