= Merrill Kenneth Albert =

American lawyer (1923–2011)

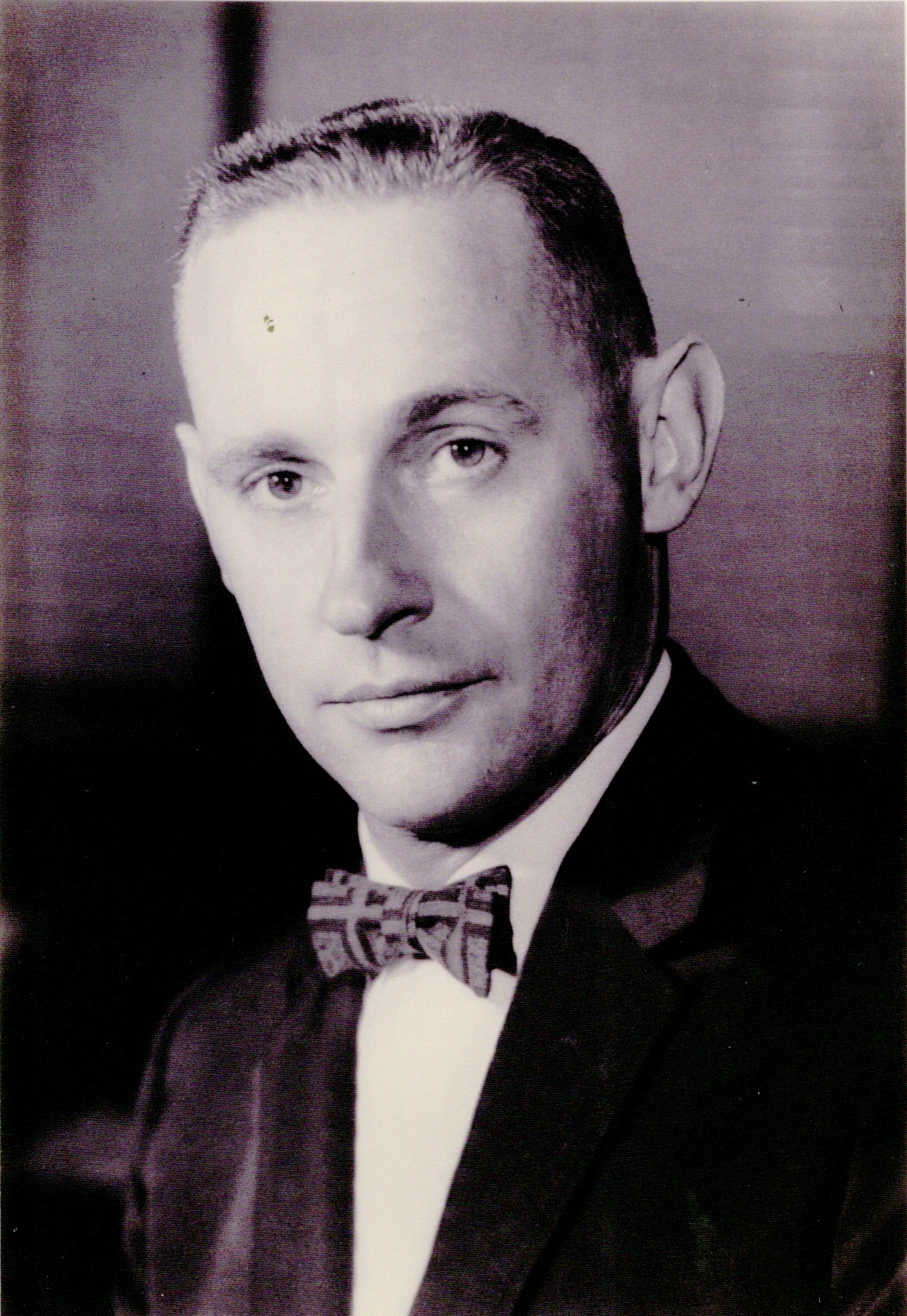
- Born: April 19, 1923; New Haven, Connecticut
- Died: December 23, 2011 (aged 88); Los Angeles, California
- Education: University of California, Berkeley (B.A., J.D)
- Occupation: Attorney
- Known for: trial lawyer; novelist

Merrill Kenneth Albert (April 19, 1923 – December 23, 2011) was an American author and trial lawyer best known for his colorful courtroom tactics. One of Los Angeles' foremost trial advocates, Albert introduced several practices – such as the use of dummies and other tools in reconstructing incidents – familiar in current legal practice but virtually non-existent when he began his career. He was a pioneer in the development and use of biomechanical devices and modeling in major personal injury cases to explain the mechanical properties of the musculoskeletal system in relation to the physics and dynamics of collisions with cars, trains, and human beings involved in accidents. He was the lead trial attorney in "bet the company" cases for the Union Pacific Railroad, the Santa Fe Railroad, the Southern Pacific Transportation Company, Swinerton Construction Co., and the Regents of the University of California. Some of his more dramatic trials are recounted in Tales of the Rails: Railroad Claims Stories by Norman Udewitz.

== Early life and education ==
Albert was born on April 19, 1923, in New Haven, Connecticut. He and his brother were later abandoned by their mother at an Oakland, California orphanage. Left under the name of Merrill Smith, he picked apples at the Salvation Army Home for Boys during the Great Depression.

He was placed in several foster homes until being permanently settled with the Tucker family of Oakland. After graduating at the top of his class from Oakland Technical High School in 1940, he attended the University of California, Berkeley. His studies were interrupted by the outbreak of World War II, when Albert joined the United States Merchant Marine discovering upon entrance that "Albert" rather than Smith was his birth name. After becoming the youngest officer ever to obtain a Master's License in the Merchant Marine, Albert stopped sailing and returned to his studies at UC Berkeley. There he was elected president of his fraternity, Sigma Nu, and would become a two-time captain of the varsity tennis team. He made the team's "All Star" list for 1949-1951. After completing his undergraduate degree, Albert was admitted to UC Berkeley's Boalt Hall School of Law, where he was subsequently published as the reviewing editor of the California Law Review. He graduated in 1955, the sixth in his class.

== Legal career ==
In the three decades following his graduation from law school, Merrill Albert practiced law in Los Angeles, specializing in defending large corporations against a wide range of high-exposure personal injury and other "bet the company" lawsuits. It was during this time that Albert began using incident reconstructions during trials in order to demonstrate whether or not the plaintiffs' claims were physically possible. He was also a pioneer in the early use of biomechanical accident reconstruction dummies at trial. He tried over 300 cases, winning the vast majority of them, many against the foremost plaintiff's trial attorneys of the era. His courtroom tactics were likened by many of his contemporaries to those of the fictional Perry Mason, which reportedly more than once took their inspiration from Albert's actual trials.

== Retirement and writing ==
In 1990 Albert retired from the practice of law and devoted himself to the full-time enjoyment of opera, tennis, horse racing (he was a long-time member of the Santa Anita Park Turf Club), and various other pursuits. He also began writing, and his novel, The Big Casino, was published posthumously in 2003. The book has proved popular in Great Britain, Canada, Australia, New Zealand, South Africa, and India.

It was followed in 2011 by the collection The Year 2012 Ushers in the Age of Fire and Other Short Stories, a series of tales centering on a coming apocalypse and a Polynesian tribe's attempts to prepare for it. At the time of his death Albert was at work on two other books. Adolf Hitler is Alive! – which postulates an enclave of Nazis who had escaped from Berlin to set up a secret society in the Antarctica to plot their revenge – and the Trinity of Life, a philosophical speculation on tripartite confluences in history, politics, and religion throughout human history – will be published posthumously.
