= Gary Fayard =

Gary Fayard (born 1953) is a former chief financial officer and executive vice president of The Coca-Cola Company. He was with the company 20 years, 15 as CFO. He is a 1975 graduate of the University of Alabama, where he was a brother of the Sigma Nu fraternity.

After retiring, Fayard created a Black Angus cattle farm in Tennessee.

In 2019, Fayard was inducted into the Alabama Business Hall of Fame.

== Awards and recognition ==
In 2013, AdvisoryCloud ranked Gary Fayard as the #15 CFO on their Top Financing Executive List.

== Board memberships ==
Year	Title	Company	Ref
2001-2003	Board Member	Panamerican Beverages Inc	
2001–2008	Board Member	Coca-Cola Enterprises Inc	
2003–2007	Board Member	Coca-Cola Femsa SA de CV	
2007-2016	Board Member	Coca-Cola Femsa SAB de CV	
2014–Present	Board Member	Genuine Parts Co	
2015–Present	Board Member	Monster Beverage Corp	
