= List of Sigma Nu chapters =

Sigma Nu is an American college fraternity founded at the Virginia Military Institute in 1869. In the following list, active chapters are indicated in bold and inactive chapters and institutions are indicated in italics.

Chapter	Charter date and range	Institution	City or county	State, district, or province	Status	Ref.
Alpha	January 1, 1869 – 1888; 1909–1915	Virginia Military Institute	Lexington	Virginia	Inactive	(Note: Chapter went dormant twice because of anti-fraternity policies.)
**Beta**	1871–1879, 1883–1891, 1900–2014, 2018	University of Virginia	Charlottesville	Virginia	Active	(Note: In 2014, the chapter lost its charter due to hazing pledges)
Gamma (First)	1871–1871	Bailey Law School	Asheville	North Carolina	Inactive	(Note: Gamma only admitted one member and its charter was withdrawn almost immediately.)
Delta (First)	1871–1872	Tarboro citywide	Tarboro	North Carolina	Inactive	(Note: This was a non-collegiate chapter, consisting of the young businessmen of the community. It was decided this chapter did not have a place in the fraternity and its charter was withdrawn shortly after it was established.)
**Mu**	1873–1877, 1884–2000, 2004	University of Georgia	Athens	Georgia	Active	(Note: Chapter went dormant briefly because of anti-fraternity laws.)
**Theta**	1874–1882, 1884	University of Alabama	Tuscaloosa	Alabama	Active	
**Iota**	1879–1881, 1884–1886, 1890	Samford University	Homewood	Alabama	Active	
**Kappa**	1881–1933, 1972–2016, April 2019	University of North Georgia	Dahlonega	Georgia	Active	(Note: In February 2016, Sigma Nu suspended this chapter due to allegations of hazing and alcohol abuse.)
**Lambda**	1882–2020, 2024	Washington and Lee University	Lexington	Virginia	Active	(Note: Chapter reformed in 1972 from the Rex Club (local), established in 1916. It also reformed as a colony in 2018. Regained Chapter status in 2024.)
Epsilon	1883–1885, 1899–2017	Bethany College	Bethany	West Virginia	Inactive	
Zeta	1883–1901	Central University of Kentucky	Richmond	Kentucky	Inactive	(Note: Chapter went inactive when Central University merged into Centre College in 1901.)
**Eta**	1884–1932, 1948	Mercer University	Macon	Georgia	Active	(Note: Chapter reformed in 1948 from Alpha Lambda Tau (local), established in 1923.)
**Nu**	1884–2005, 2008	University of Kansas	Lawrence	Kansas	Active	
Xi	1884–1990, 1994–2014	Emory University	Atlanta	Georgia	Inactive	(Note: In 2014, the chapter was suspended for five years for repeated hazing and misconduct violations. One hazing incident required pledges to “consume food items in large quantities at rapid paces to the point of physical harm and vomiting")
Omicron	1884–1904	Bethel College	Russellville	Kentucky	Inactive	(Note: Sigma Nu withdrew this chapter's charter because of the decline of Bethel College.)
Pi	1885–2002	Lehigh University	Bethlehem	Pennsylvania	Inactive	
**Delta (Second)**	1886–1897, 1928–198x ? 199x ?	University of South Carolina	Columbia	South Carolina	Active	(Note: Chapter went dormant in 1897 because of college and trustee opposition.)
**Rho**	1886	University of Missouri	Columbia	Missouri	Active	
**Sigma**	1886–1888, 1891–200x ?, 2008	Vanderbilt University	Nashville	Tennessee	Active	
Tau	1886–1891	South Carolina Military Academy	Charleston	South Carolina	Inactive	(Note: Chapter went inactive because of college or trustee opposition.)
**Upsilon**	1886–2015, 20xx ?	University of Texas at Austin	Austin	Texas	Active	
**Phi**	1887–2004, 2008	Louisiana State University	Baton Rouge	Louisiana	Active	(Note: Chapter formed from Kappa Sigma Kappa, established in 1885. After going dormant, it reformed as a colony in 2007.)
**Chi**	1888–1913	Cornell College	Mount Vernon	Iowa	Colony	(Note: Refored as a colony in 2022.)
**Psi**	1888–200x ?, 2007	University of North Carolina at Chapel Hill	Chapel Hill	North Carolina	Active	
Beta Phi	1888–1890, 1895–1898, 1903–1934,v1962–200x ?	Tulane University	New Orleans	Louisiana	Inactive	
Beta Alpha	1889–1892, 1985	Yale University	New Haven	Connecticut	Inactive	(Note: Sigma Nu withdrew the chapter's charter in 1892 when Yale instituted a class system for student societies.)
**Beta Omicron**	1889–1893, 1921	Sewanee: The University of the South	Sewanee	Tennessee	Active	(Note: Chapter reformed in 1921 from Tau Gamma Phi, established in 1920.)
**Beta Beta**	1890	DePauw University	Greencastle	Indiana	Active	(Note: Chapter formed from Lethe (local), established in 1890. After going dormant, it reformed as a colony in 1985.)
**Beta Theta**	1890	Auburn University	Auburn	Alabama	Active	
Beta Gamma	1891–1896, 1931–2013	Missouri Valley College	Marshall	Missouri	Inactive	(Note: Chapter reformed in 1931 from Tharso (local), established in 1928.)
Beta Delta	1891–1894	Drake University	Des Moines	Iowa	Inactive	
Beta Epsilon (First)	1891–1894	Upper Iowa University	Fayette	Iowa	Inactive, Reassigned	
**Beta Zeta**	1891–2015, 2022	Purdue University	West Lafayette	Indiana	Active	(Note: In 2015, the chapter was suspended for two years for hazing pledges, illegal drug use, and alcohol consumption by minors.)
**Beta Nu**	1891–1991	Ohio State University	Columbus	Ohio	Colony	
**Beta Chi**	1891–1963, 19xx ?	Stanford University	Stanford	California	Active	
Delta Theta (First)	1891–1930	Lombard College	Galesburg	Illinois	Moved	(Note: Chapter formed from Delta Theta (local), established in 1869. Lombard College closed in 1930. Members of Delta Theta transferred to Knox College, taking the chapter with them.)
**Delta Theta (Second)**	1930	Knox College (Illinois)	Galesburg	Illinois	Active	(Note: Chapter was founded at Lombard College, which closed in 1930. Lombard did not merge with Knox College, but numerous students transferred at the time of closure, including members of Delta Theta who moved the chapter with them.)
**Beta Eta**	1892–2017, 2022	Indiana University Bloomington	Bloomington	Indiana	Active	(Note: Chapter formed from the Independent Literary Society (local), established in 1883.) (Note: In October 2017, Sigma Nu suspended this chapter for alcohol and hazing-related violations; recolonized in 2022.)
**Beta Iota**	1892	University of Mount Union	Alliance	Ohio	Active	
Beta Kappa (First)	1892–1887	Southwest Kansas College	Winfield	Kansas	Moved	(Note: The chapter went dormant because of faculty opposition. Its charter and membership role was transferred to Kansas State College.)
Beta Lambda	1892–1902	Central College	Fayette	Missouri	Inactive	
**Beta Psi**	1892	University of California, Berkeley	Berkeley	California	Active	
Beta Mu	1893–2019	University of Iowa	Iowa City	Iowa	Inactive	
Beta Xi	1894–2001	William Jewell College	Liberty	Missouri	Inactive	(Note: Chapter formed from Phe Yod Ins (local), established in 1892.)
**Beta Rho**	1894–1895, 1897–1898, 1904	University of Pennsylvania	Philadelphia	Pennsylvania	Active	
Beta Pi (see Gamma Rho)	1895–1934	University of Chicago	Chicago	Illinois	Inactive	(Note: Chapter was later reesblished as Gamma Rho.)
Beta Tau	1895–200x ?, 2009 – November 2026	North Carolina State University	Raleigh	North Carolina	Inactive	(Note: The national fraternity and university closed the chapter in November 2026 for hazing. The chapter will be eligible to apply to NCSU for reinstatement in four years.)
**Beta Upsilon**	1895	Rose–Hulman Institute of Technology	Terre Haute	Indiana	Active	
**Gamma Gamma**	1895–1997, 2003	Albion College	Albion	Michigan	Active	
**Gamma Chi**	1896	University of Washington	Seattle	Washington	Active	
**Gamma Alpha**	1896	Georgia Tech	Atlanta	Georgia	Active	
**Gamma Beta**	1898–200x ?, 2013	Northwestern University	Evanston	Illinois	Active	(Note: Chapter formed from Gamma Delta Sigma (local), established in 1896. After going dormant, it reformed as a colony in 2013.)
Beta Sigma	1898–1990	University of Vermont	Burlington	Vermont	Inactive	(Note: Chapter formed from Alpha Phi (local), established in 1895.)
**Gamma Delta**	1900	Stevens Institute of Technology	Hoboken	New Jersey	Active	
Gamma Epsilon	1900–1995	Lafayette College	Easton	Pennsylvania	Inactive	
**Gamma Zeta**	1900–1970, 19xx ?–2004, 2010	University of Oregon	Eugene	Oregon	Active	
**Gamma Eta**	1901	Colorado School of Mines	Golden	Colorado	Active	
Gamma Theta	1901–2018	Cornell University	Ithaca	New York	Inactive	
**Gamma Iota**	1902–1965, 1967–2012, 2016	University of Kentucky	Lexington	Kentucky	Active	
**Gamma Kappa**	1902	University of Colorado Boulder	Boulder	Colorado	Active	
Gamma Lambda	1902–1962, 1980–200x ?	University of Wisconsin–Madison	Madison	Wisconsin	Inactive	
**Gamma Mu**	1902	University of Illinois at Urbana-Champaign	Urbana	Illinois	Active	
**Gamma Nu**	1902–2009, 2020	University of Michigan	Ann Arbor	Michigan	Active	
**Gamma Xi**	1903	Missouri University of Science and Technology	Rolla	Missouri	Active	
**Gamma Omicron**	1903	Washington University in St. Louis	St. Louis	Missouri	Active	
**Gamma Pi**	1904–200x ?, 2012	West Virginia University	Morgantown	West Virginia	Active	(Note: Chapter formed from the Alfred Guild (local), established in 1902. After going dormant, it reformed as a colony in 2011.)
Gamma Rho (see Beta Pi)	1904–1934	University of Chicago	Chicago	Illinois	Inactive	(Note: Chapter formed from Sigma Nu Association, established in 1903.)
**Gamma Sigma**	1904–1998, 2024	Iowa State University	Ames	Iowa	Colony	(Note: Chapter formed from Gamma Tau (local), established in 1904.)
**Gamma Tau**	1904	University of Minnesota	Minneapolis	Minnesota	Active	(Note: Chapter formed from Kappa Phi Beta (local), established in 1893.)
**Gamma Upsilon**	1904–2000, 2005	University of Arkansas	Fayetteville	Arkansas	Active	(Note: Chapter formed from Alpha Gamma, established in 1902. After going dormant, it reformed as a colony in 2004.)
**Gamma Phi**	1905	University of Montana	Missoula	Montana	Active	(Note: Chapter formed from House of Jericho (local), established in 1902.)
Gamma Psi	1906–1970, 1988–2006	Syracuse University	Syracuse	New York	Inactive	
**Delta Alpha**	1907	Case Western Reserve University	Cleveland	Ohio	Active	
**Delta Beta**	1907–1961, 1986	Dartmouth College	Hanover	New Hampshire	Active	(Note: Chapter formed from Puckwana (local), established in 1903. After going dormant, it reformed from Sigma Nu Delta (local), established in 1961.)
**Delta Gamma**	1908–1965, 198x ?	Columbia University	New York City	New York	Active	(Note: Chapter formed from Grey & Gold (local), established in 1907.)
Delta Delta	1909–2018	Pennsylvania State University	University Park	Pennsylvania	Inactive	(Note: Chapter formed from Union (local), established in 1904.)
**Delta Epsilon**	1909–2000, 2014	University of Oklahoma	Norman	Oklahoma	Active	(Note: Chapter formed from Delta Delta (local), established in 1908. After going dormant, it reformed as a colony in 2012.)
Delta Zeta	1909–1948	Western Reserve University	Cleveland	Ohio	Inactive	(Note: Chapter formed from Alpha Nu (local), established in 1907. Case Institute of Technology and Western Reserve University merged to form Case Western Reserve University while Delta Zeta was still dormant, rendering the chapter's dormancy permanent and making Delta Alpha the only extant chapter from the two schools)
**Delta Eta**	1909–2014, 2020	University of Nebraska–Lincoln	Lincoln	Nebraska	Active	(Note: Chapter formed from Kappa Delta Pi (local), established in 1901.) (Note: In 2014, the chapter was suspended for fire code and housing violations.)
**Delta Iota**	1910–2007, 2010	Washington State University	Pullman	Washington	Active	(Note: Chapter formed from Ophites (local), established in 1905.)
**Delta Kappa**	1911–200x ?, 2011–2019	University of Delaware	Newark	Delaware	Colony	(Note: Chapter formed from Phi Sigma (local), established in 1906. After going dormant, it reformed as a colony in 2008.)
Delta Lambda	1912–1964	Brown University	Providence	Rhode Island	Inactive	(Note: Chapter formed from Sigma Delta Kappa (local), established in 1907.)
**Delta Mu**	1913	Stetson University	DeLand	Florida	Active	(Note: Chapter formed from Nu Sigma (local), established in 1909.)
Delta Nu	1913–2012	University of Maine	Orono	Maine	Inactive	(Note: Chapter formed from Theta Epsilon (local), established in 1903.)
Beta Kappa (Second)	1913–2014	Kansas State University	Manhattan	Kansas	Inactive	(Note: After Beta Kappa (First) at Southwest Kansas College was forced to close because of faculty opposition, its charter and membership role was transferred to Kansas State College.)
Delta Xi	1914–2017	University of Nevada, Reno	Reno	Nevada	Suspended	(Note: Chapter formed from the Nevada Club (local), established in 1911.)
**Delta Omicron**	1915	University of Idaho	Moscow	Idaho	Active	(Note: Chapter formed from Zeta Delta (local), established in 1910.) (Note: Chapter formed from Beta Chi, established in 1914. It went inactive because the college no longer allowed Greek Letter fraternities and sororities.)
Delta Pi	1915–2020	George Washington University	Washington, D.C.	District of Columbia	Inactive	(Note: Chapter formed from Alpha Beta Phi (local), established in 1904.)
**Delta Rho**	1915–1998, 2012	Colorado State University	Fort Collins	Colorado	Active	(Note: Chapter formed from Alpha Kappa Epsilon (local), established in 1903. After going dormant, it reformed as a colony in 2008.)
**Delta Sigma**	1916–1938, 1940	Carnegie Mellon University	Pittsburgh	Pennsylvania	Active	(Note: Chapter formed from Beta Theta Epsilon (local), established in 1907. After going dormant, it reformed as a colony in 1939.)
**Delta Tau**	1917–2010, 2017	Oregon State University	Corvallis	Oregon	Active	(Note: Chapter formed from Delta Tau (local), established in 1910. After going dormant, it reformed as a colony in 2015.)
Delta Upsilon	1917–1968	Colgate University	Hamilton	New York	Inactive	(Note: Chapter formed from Theta Delta Sigma (local), established in 1914.)
**Delta Phi**	1917	University of Maryland, College Park	College Park	Maryland	Active	(Note: Chapter formed from Gamma Phi (local), established in 1912.)
Delta Chi	1918–1972, 1984–20xx ?	Trinity College	Hartford	Connecticut	Inactive	(Note: Chapter formed from Sigma Psi (local), established in 1911. After going dormant, it reformed as a colony in 1982.)
Delta Psi	1918–1970	Bowdoin College	Brunswick	Maine	Inactive	
**Epsilon Alpha**	1918–1983, 1988–1997, 2002–2009, 2021	University of Arizona	Tucson	Arizona	Active	(Note: Chapter formed from Sigma Phi Beta (local), established in 1911. After going dormant, it reformed as a colony in 1986, 2000, and 2019.)
**Epsilon Beta**	1919	Drury University	Springfield	Missouri	Active	(Note: Chapter formed from Obelisk (local), established in 1911.)
Epsilon Gamma	1920–1961	Wesleyan University	Middletown	Connecticut	Inactive	(Note: Chapter formed from Alpha Sigma Delta (local), established in 1916.)
**Epsilon Delta**	1920–2010, 2015	University of Wyoming	Laramie	Wyoming	Active	(Note: Chapter formed from Gamma Theta Chi (local), established in 1916. After going dormant, it reformed as a colony in 2013.)
**Epsilon Epsilon**	1920	Oklahoma State University–Stillwater	Stillwater	Oklahoma	Active	(Note: Chapter formed from Phi Kappa Delta (local), established in 1914.)
**Epsilon Zeta**	1920–2000, 2007	University of Florida	Gainesville	Florida	Active	(Note: Chapter formed from Nu Sigma (local), established in 1919. After going dormant, it reformed as a colony in 2005.)
**Epsilon Eta**	1921	University of Tennessee	Knoxville	Tennessee	Active	(Note: Chapter formed from Phi Beta Sigma (local), established in 1919.)
**Epsilon Theta**	1922–1974, 1995	Massachusetts Institute of Technology	Cambridge	Massachusetts	Active	(Note: Chapter formed as a colony in 1920. After going dormant, it reformed from Delta Phi (local), established in 1990.)
Epsilon Iota	1922–1936, 1952–1973, 1975–200x ?	College of William & Mary	Williamsburg	Virginia	Inactive	(Note: Chapter formed from Phi Tau Beta (local), established in 1917. After going dormant, it reformed from Sigma Rho (local), originally formed in 1937. It also reformed as a colony in 1974.)
**Epsilon Kappa**	1923	University of North Dakota	Grand Forks	North Dakota	Active	(Note: Chapter formed from Synergon (local), established in 1910.)
Epsilon Lambda	1924-2025	University of Utah	Salt Lake City	Utah	Inactive	(Note: Chapter formed from Theta Sigma (local), established in 1916.)
**Epsilon Mu**	1926–xxxx ?, 2002	Butler University	Indianapolis	Indiana	Active	(Note: Chapter formed from Delta Phi Sigma (local), established in 1923. After going dormant, it reformed as a colony in 2002.)
**Epsilon Nu**	1927–2015, 2024	Miami University	Oxford	Ohio	Active	(Note: Chapter formed from Apha Theta Phi, established in 1919. In 2015, it was suspended until 2018 for violating social probation. There were also allegations of forcing underage pledges to consume large amounts of alcohol and banning pledges from shaving and showering.)
**Epsilon Xi**	1927	University of Mississippi	Oxford	Mississippi	Active	(Note: Chapter formed from Tau Gamma Phi, established in 1924. In 2012, it was suspended for repeated hazing violations.)
**Epsilon Omicron**	1930–1965, 1968	University of Southern California	Los Angeles	California	Active	(Note: Chapter formed from Theta Sigma Nu (local), established in 1921. After going dormant, it reformed as a colony in 1967.)
**Epsilon Pi**	1930	University of California, Los Angeles	Los Angeles	California	Active	(Note: Chapter formed from Alpha Delta Tau (local), established in 1921.)
**Gamma (Second)**	1931–197x ?, 1976	Duke University	Durham	North Carolina	Active	(Note: Chapter formed from the Goblins (local), established in 1929. After going dormant, it reformed as a colony in 1975. Vote occurred in Fall 1931 to revive the chapter at Duke.)
**Epsilon Rho**	1934–1973, 1978	Michigan State University	East Lansing	Michigan	Active	(Note: Chapter formed from Eunomian (local), established in 1903.)
**Epsilon Sigma**	1934	Rhodes College	Memphis	Tennessee	Active	(Note: Chapter formed from Beta Sigma (local), established in 1925.)
Epsilon Tau	1938–1972	Rollins College	Winter Park	Florida	Inactive	(Note: Chapter formed from Rho Lambda Nu (local), established in 1921.)
Epsilon Upsilon	1938–2008	Utah State University	Logan	Utah	Inactive	(Note: Chapter formed from Delta Nu (local), established in 1914.)
Epsilon Phi	1943–1951	University of Connecticut	Storrs	Connecticut	Inactive	(Note: Chapter formed from Eta Lambda Sigma (local), established in 1893.)
**Epsilon Chi**	1946–199x ?, 2006	Bowling Green State University	Bowling Green	Ohio	Active	(Note: Chapter formed from Beta Upsilon Gamma (local), established in 1940. After going dormant, it reformed as a colony in 2003.)
Epsilon Psi	1947–2013	Westminster College	New Wilmington	Pennsylvania	Inactive	(Note: Chapter formed from Kappa Phi Lambda (local), established in 1874.)
Zeta Alpha	1948–2009	University of Puget Sound	Tacoma	Washington	Inactive	(Note: Chapter formed from Alpha Chi Nu (local), established in 1922.)
Zeta Beta	1948–1967	University of Miami	Coral Gables	Florida	Inactive	
**Zeta Gamma**	1949–1970, 1987–2020	Kent State University	Kent	Ohio	Colony	(Note: Chapter formed from Delta Phi Sigma (local), established in 1923. After going dormant, it reformed as a colony in 1986.)
Zeta Delta	1949–2006	University of Toronto	Toronto	Ontario, Canada	Inactive	(Note: Chapter formed as Kappa Rho Tau (local), established in 1922.)
Zeta Epsilon	1949–1959	Norwich University	Northfield	Vermont	Inactive	(Note: Chapter formed from Phi Kappa Delta (local), established in 1907.)
Zeta Zeta	1950–2012	Florida State University	Tallahassee	Florida	Inactive	(Note: Chapter formed from Phi Delta (local), established in 1919.)
Zeta Eta	1950–2015	Tufts University	Medford	Massachusetts	Inactive	
**Zeta Theta**	1951	Presbyterian College	Clinton	South Carolina	Active	(Note: Chapter formed from Alpha Lambda Tau (local), established in 1927.)
Zeta Iota	1951–2019	San Jose State University	San Jose	California	Inactive	(Note: Chapter formed from Theta Mu Sigma (local), established in 1943.)
**Zeta Kappa**	1951	California State University, Fresno	Fresno	California	Active	(Note: Chapter formed from Mu Alpha Delta (local), established in 1922.)
**Zeta Lambda**	1951–2004, 2022	University of Tulsa	Tulsa	Oklahoma	Active	(Note: Chapter formed from Beta Tau (local), established in 1947. After going dormant, it reformed as a colony in 2017.)
Zeta Mu	1951–200x ?	Ohio University	Athens	Ohio	Inactive	(Note: Chapter formed from Sigma Omicron Nu (local), established in 1948.)
**Zeta Nu**	1952–200x ?, 2017	Montana State University	Bozeman	Montana	Active	(Note: Chapter formed from Gamma Phi (local), established in 1947. After going dormant, it reformed as a colony in 2010.)
**Zeta Xi**	1952–1991, 2009	University of California, Davis	Davis	California	Active	(Note: Chapter formed from Philo Delphas (local), established in 1920. After going dormant, it reformed as a colony in 2008.)
**Zeta Omicron**	1953–2010, 2016	University of North Texas	Denton	Texas	Active	(Note: Chapter formed from Chi Sigma Phi (local), established in 1949. After going dormant, it reformed as a colony in 2012.)
**Zeta Pi**	1953	Texas Tech University	Lubbock	Texas	Active	(Note: Chapter formed from Socii (local), established in 1937.)
Beta Epsilon (Second)	1954 – March 19, 2017	Coe College	Cedar Rapids	Iowa	Inactive	(Note: Chapter formed from Delta Phi Epsilon (local), established in 1901.)
Zeta Rho	1954–1996	University of Rhode Island	Kingston	Rhode Island	Inactive	(Note: Chapter formed from Alpha Tau Gamma (local), established in 1929.)
**Zeta Sigma**	1954	Gettysburg College	Gettysburg	Pennsylvania	Active	(Note: Chapter formed from Phi Kappa Rho (local), established in 1932.)
Zeta Tau	1954–1976	Ripon College	Ripon	Wisconsin	Inactive	(Note: Chapter formed from Theta Sigma Tau (local), established in 1910.)
**Zeta Upsilon**	1955–xxxx ?, 2005–2012, 2018	Arizona State University	Tempe	Arizona	Active	(Note: Chapter formed from Nu Sigma (local), established in 1950. After going dormant, it reformed as a colony in 2004 and 2017.)
**Zeta Phi**	1955	Bradley University	Peoria	Illinois	Active	(Note: Chapter formed from Alpha Pi (local), established in 1899.)
**Zeta Chi**	1956–2007, 2013	University of Houston	Houston	Texas	Active	(Note: Chapter formed from the Cavaliers (local), established in 1946. After going dormant, it reformed as a colony in 2011.)
**Zeta Psi**	1957	Lamar University	Beaumont	Texas	Active	(Note: Chapter formed from Kollege Klub (local), established in 1923.)
Eta Alpha	1958–1976	Davidson College	Davidson	North Carolina	Inactive	(Note: Chapter formed from Alpha Theta Phi (local), established in 1956.)
**Eta Beta**	1959–1973, 1977–2005, 2017	East Carolina University	Greenville	North Carolina	Active	(Note: Chapter formed from Kappa Sigma Nu (local), established in 1956. After going dormant, it reformed as a colony in 1976 and 2016.)
**Eta Gamma**	1959	Georgia State University	Atlanta	Georgia	Active	(Note: Chapter formed from Sigma Alpha Nu (local), established in 1956.)
**Eta Delta**	1959	West Texas A&M University	Canyon	Texas	Active	(Note: Chapter formed from Epsilon Beta (local), established in 1935.)
**Eta Epsilon**	1960	Kentucky Wesleyan College	Owensboro	Kentucky	Active	(Note: Chapter formed from Epsilon Beta (local), established in 1935.)
**Eta Zeta**	1961	Louisiana Tech University	Ruston	Louisiana	Active	
Eta Eta	1961–19xx ?	Idaho State University	Pocatello	Idaho	Inactive	(Note: Chapter formed from Sigma Nu Alpha (local), established in 1960.)
**Eta Theta**	1962	North Dakota State University	Fargo	North Dakota	Active	
**Eta Iota**	1962	Northern Arizona University	Flagstaff	Arizona	Active	
**Eta Kappa**	1963–2012	San Diego State University	San Diego	California	Active	(Note: Chapter formed from Sigma Delta Phi, established in 1960.)
Eta Lambda	1963–1973, 1985–2011	University of Cincinnati	Cincinnati	Ohio	Inactive	
**Eta Mu**	1963	Kettering University	Flint	Michigan	Active	(Note: Chapter formed from Delta Chi Rho (local), established in 1954.)
**Eta Nu**	1963–2003, 2011	University of Louisiana at Lafayette	Lafayette	Louisiana	Active	
Eta Xi	1963–20xx ?	University of Arkansas at Little Rock	Little Rock	Arkansas	Inactive	(Note: Chapter formed from Delta Kappa (local), established in 1932.)
**Eta Omicron**	1964	Wofford College	Spartanburg	South Carolina	Active	
**Eta Pi**	1965–1997, 1999	Hampden–Sydney College	Hampden Sydney	Virginia	Active	(Note: Chapter formed from Delta Epsilon (local) which was established in 1962. Became a chapter of Sigma Nu in 1965. After going dormant, it reformed as a colony in 1998 and regained chapter status in 1999.)
**Eta Rho**	1965	Western Kentucky University	Bowling Green	Kentucky	Active	(Note: Chapter formed from Omicron Kappa Alpha (local), established in 1955.)
Eta Sigma	1966–2001	Eastern New Mexico University	Portales	New Mexico	Inactive	
**Eta Tau**	1966	Texas State University	San Marcos	Texas	Active	(Note: Chapter formed from Kappa Tau Delta (local), established in 1931.)
**Eta Upsilon**	1966	Midwestern State University	Wichita Falls	Texas	Active	(Note: Chapter formed from Chi Eta (local), established in 1949.)
**Eta Phi**	1966	California State University, Los Angeles	Los Angeles	California	Active	(Note: Chapter formed from Kappa Phi Sigma (local), established in 1950.)
**Eta Chi**	1967	Old Dominion University	Norfolk	Virginia	Active	
Eta Psi	1967–1991	Ashland University	Ashland	Ohio	Inactive	(Note: Chapter formed from Alpha Sigma Nu (local), established in 1964.)
**Theta Alpha**	1967	University of South Florida	Tampa	Florida	Active	(Note: Chapter formed from Crates Theta (local), established in 1963.)
Theta Beta	1968–2012	University of South Dakota	Vermillion	South Dakota	Inactive	
**Theta Gamma**	1969	University of Southern Mississippi	Hattiesburg	Mississippi	Active	
Theta Delta	1969–1986	Murray State University	Murray	Kentucky	Inactive	(Note: Chapter formed from Kappa Gamma (local), established in 1967.)
Theta Epsilon	1969–1972	Johns Hopkins University	Baltimore	Maryland	Inactive	
**Theta Zeta**	1970–200x ?, 2010	Clemson University	Clemson	South Carolina	Active	(Note: Chapter formed from Kappa Delta Chi (local), established in 1960. After going dormant, it reformed as a colony in 2009.)
**Theta Eta**	1970–1997, 2008	Northern Illinois University	DeKalb	Illinois	Active	(Note: Chapter formed from Beta Phi Gamma (local), established in 1966. After going dormant, it reformed as a colony in 2006.)
**Theta Theta**	1970–199x ?, 2003	Eastern Kentucky University	Richmond	Kentucky	Active	(Note: Chapter formed from Sigma Chi Delta (local), established in 1966. After going dormant, it reformed as a colony in 2001.)
Theta Iota	1970–1985, 1995–2007, 2008–2015	Middle Tennessee State University	Murfreesboro	Tennessee	Inactive	(Note: Chapter formed from Sigma Delta Zeta (local), established in 1966. After going dormant, it reformed as a colony in 1994 and 2007. In 2015, the chapter was suspended until 2019 due to hazing and alcohol violations.)
**Theta Kappa**	1970–2004, 2010	Georgia Southern University	Statesboro	Georgia	Active	(Note: Chapter formed from Nu Sigma (local), established in 1967. After going dormant, it reformed as a colony in 2008.)
**Theta Lambda**	1970–1973, 1988	Eastern Washington University	Cheney	Washington	Active	(Note: Chapter formed from Beta Delta Theta (local), established in 1963. After going dormant, it reformed as a colony in 1986.)
Theta Mu	1970–1979	University of South Alabama	Mobile	Alabama	Inactive	(Note: Chapter formed from Sigma Nu Omega (local), established in 1965.)
**Theta Nu**	1971	Ball State University	Muncie	Indiana	Active	(Note: Chapter formed from Tau Delta Epsilon (local), established in 1969.)
**Theta Xi**	1971	Virginia Tech	Blacksburg	Virginia	Active	(Note: Chapter formed from Pi Kappa (local), established in 1961.)
Theta Omicron	1972–1979	Weber State University	Ogden	Utah	Inactive	(Note: Chapter formed from Pi Kappa (local), established in 1961.)
**Theta Pi**	1972	University of West Georgia	Carrollton	Georgia	Active	
**Theta Rho**	1972–19xx ?, 2017	Illinois State University	Normal	Illinois	Active	
**Theta Sigma**	1972–2004, 2012	Missouri State University	Springfield	Missouri	Active	(Note: Chapter formed from Alpha Sigma Nu (local), established in 1969. In 2003, the chapter lost its charter for hazing pledges; however, it reformed as a colony in 2010 and was reinstated in 2012.)
Theta Tau	1973–1980, 19xx ?–200x ?	Morehead State University	Morehead	Kentucky	Inactive	(Note: Chapter formed from Sigma Sigma Nu (local), established in 1972.)
Theta Upsilon	1973–199x ?	New Mexico State University	Las Cruces	New Mexico	Inactive	
Theta Phi	1973–2007	Lander University	Greenwood	South Carolina	Inactive	(Note: Chapter formed from Chi Sigma (local), established in 1967.)
Theta Chi	1973–2012	East Tennessee State University	Johnson City	Tennessee	Inactive	
Theta Psi	1973–19xx ?	Armstrong State College	Savannah	Georgia	Inactive	
Iota Alpha	1974–xxxx ?	Indiana University of Pennsylvania	Indiana	Pennsylvania	Inactive	(Note: Chapter formed from Beta Tau Lambda (local), established in 1972.)
**Iota Beta**	1974–2000, 2009	Virginia Wesleyan University	Virginia Beach	Virginia	Active	
**Iota Gamma**	1974–1994, 2009	Mississippi State University	Starkville	Mississippi	Active	
**Iota Delta**	1974	James Madison University	Harrisonburg	Virginia	Active	
Iota Epsilon	1974–200x ?	Missouri Southern State University	Joplin	Missouri	Inactive	(Note: Chapter formed from Mu Sigma Gamma (local), established in 1968.)
Iota Zeta	1974–200x ?	Vincennes University	Vincennes	Indiana	Inactive	(Note: Chapter formed from Phi Delta Sigma (local), established in 1970.)
Iota Eta	1974–19xx ?	University of Nebraska Omaha	Omaha	Nebraska	Inactive	
**Iota Theta**	1974–19xx ?, 2020	Southern Methodist University	Dallas	Texas	Active	
Iota Iota	1974–19xx ?	Valley City State University	Valley City	North Dakota	Inactive	
**Iota Kappa**	1974	California State University, Chico	Chico	California	Active	
**Iota Lambda**	1975	Jacksonville State University	Jacksonville	Alabama	Active	(Note: Chapter formed from Tau Kappa Omega (local), established in 1972.)
Iota Mu	1975–xxxx ?	University of Nevada, Las Vegas	Paradise	Nevada	Inactive	
Iota Nu	1975–201x ?	University of Southern Maine	Gorham	Maine	Inactive	
Iota Xi	1976–19xx ?	Salisbury University	Salisbury	Maryland	Inactive	
Iota Omicron	1976–200x ?	University of Texas at Arlington	Arlington	Texas	Inactive	(Note: Chapter formed from Tau Beta Alpha (local).)
**Iota Pi**	1976	Kennesaw State University	Marietta	Georgia	Active	(Note: Chapter formed from Delta Phi Delta (local), established in 1974.)
**Iota Rho**	1976–1982, 1998–2016, 2022	College of Charleston	Charleston	South Carolina	Active	
**Iota Sigma**	1977	University of New Hampshire	Durham	New Hampshire	Active	
Iota Tau	1977–199x ?	Creighton University	Omaha	Nebraska	Inactive	
Iota Upsilon	1978–1994, 2008–2021	California State University, Northridge	Los Angeles	California	Inactive	
Iota Phi	1980–199x ?	Wittenberg University	Springfield	Ohio	Inactive	(Note: Chapter formed from Mu Delta (local), established in 1978.)
Iota Chi	1982–200x ?	University of North Carolina at Charlotte	Charlotte	North Carolina	Inactive	(Note: Chapter formed from Alpha Delpha (local), established in 1980.)
Iota Psi	1982–200x ?	Indiana State University	Terre Haute	Indiana	Inactive	
Kappa Alpha	1982–200x ?	Western Illinois University	Macomb	Illinois	Inactive	
Kappa Beta	1982–20xx ?	University of Western Ontario	London	Ontario, Canada	Inactive	
**Kappa Gamma**	1982–2013, 2024	California State Polytechnic University, Pomona	Pomona	California	Active	(Note: Chapter formed from Alpha Delpha (local), established in 1980.)
**Kappa Delta**	1982–2007,2; 012	Duquesne University	Pittsburgh	Pennsylvania	Active	
**Kappa Epsilon**	1983–2009, 2013	Appalachian State University	Boone	North Carolina	Active	
**Kappa Zeta**	1983–19xx, 1996	Villanova University	Villanova	Pennsylvania	Inactive	(Note: Chapter formed in Zeta Rho (local), established in 1969. After going dormant, it reformed from Alpha Nu Omega (local), established in 1994.)
Kappa Eta	1983–2008, 2014–2022	University of California, Santa Barbara	Santa Barbara	California	Inactive	
**Kappa Theta**	1984	Jacksonville University	Jacksonville	Florida	Active	
Kappa Iota	1984–2021	University of Dayton	Dayton	Ohio	Inactive	
Kappa Kappa	1984–200x ?	Radford University	Radford	Virginia	Inactive	
**Kappa Lambda**	1984	University of Akron	Akron	Ohio	Active	
Kappa Mu	1984–xxxx ?	Austin Peay State University	Clarksville	Tennessee	Inactive	
Kappa Nu	1984–2006	Central Missouri State University	Warrensburg	Missouri	Inactive	
Kappa Xi	1985–2005	Winthrop University	Rock Hill	South Carolina	Inactive	
Kappa Omicron	1985–198x ?	Marshall University	Huntington	West Virginia	Inactive	
**Kappa Pi**	1985	California Polytechnic State University, San Luis Obispo	San Luis Obispo	California	Active	
**Kappa Rho**	1985	University of California, San Diego	San Diego	California	Active	
Kappa Sigma	1985–2016	Texas A&M University	College Station	Texas	Inactive	
Kappa Tau	1985–200x ?	Binghamton University	Binghamton	New York	Inactive	
Kappa Upsilon	1985–200x ?	University of North Carolina at Greensboro	Greensboro	North Carolina	Inactive	
Kappa Phi	1985–xxxx ?	Western Carolina University	Cullowhee	North Carolina	Inactive	
**Kappa Chi**	1986	Furman University	Greenville	South Carolina	Active	
Kappa Psi	1986–19xx ?	Northeast Louisiana University	Monroe	Louisiana	Inactive	(Note: Chapter formed from Lambda Sigma Chi (local).)
Lambda Alpha	1986–2014	Wake Forest University	Winston-Salem	North Carolina	Inactive	
Lambda Beta	1986–xxxx ?	George Mason University	Fairfax	Virginia	Inactive	(Note: Chapter formed from Sigma Alpha Nu (local), established in 1983.)
**Lambda Gamma**	1986	Eastern Illinois University	Charleston	Illinois	Active	
**Lambda Delta**	1986	Minnesota State University, Mankato	Mankato	Minnesota	Active	(Note: Chapter formed from Chi Alpha (local), established in 1982.)
**Lambda Epsilon**	1987–xxxx ?, 2016	Texas Christian University	Fort Worth	Texas	Active	
Lambda Zeta	1987–1997	State University of New York at Geneseo	Geneseo	New York	Inactive	
**Lambda Eta**	1987	University of Rochester	Rochester	New York	Active	
**Lambda Theta**	1987	Birmingham–Southern College	Birmingham	Alabama	Inactive	
Lambda Iota	1987–20xx ?	Southern Utah University	Cedar City	Utah	Inactive	(Note: In 2012, the chapter was indefinitely suspended due to hazing, low academic achievement, low recruitment, and low financial resources.)
Lambda Kappa	1987–200x ?	SUNY Albany	Albany	New York	Inactive	
Lambda Lambda	1987–xxxx ?	Nicholls State University	Thibodaux	Louisiana	Inactive	
Lambda Mu	1988–xxxx ?	Wichita State University	Wichita	Kansas	Inactive	
Lambda Nu	1988–200x ?	Western Michigan University	Kalamazoo	Michigan	Inactive	
Lambda Xi	1988–xxxx ?	State University of New York at Oneonta	Oneonta	New York	Inactive	
**Lambda Omicron**	1988	University of California, Irvine	Irvine	California	Active	
Lambda Pi	1989–2021	Eastern Michigan University	Ypsilanti	Michigan	Inactive	
Lambda Rho	1989–199x ?	Seton Hall University	South Orange	New Jersey	Inactive	
Lambda Sigma	1989–199x ?	SUNY Buffalo	Buffalo	New York	Inactive	
Lambda Tau	1989–xxxx ?	Slippery Rock University	Slippery Rock	Pennsylvania	Inactive	(Note: Chapter formed from the Something New Club (local), established in 1987.)
**Lambda Upsilon**	1989	California State University, Fullerton	Fullerton	California	Active	
**Lambda Phi**	1990	University of Central Arkansas	Conway	Arkansas	Active	
**Lambda Chi**	1991	California State University, San Bernardino	San Bernardino	California	Active	(Note: Chapter formed from Delta Beta (local), established in 1990.)
Lambda Psi	1991–200x ?	University of Toledo	Toledo	Ohio	Inactive	
Mu Alpha	1991–200x ?	Baylor University	Waco	Texas	Inactive	(Note: Chapter originated as Sigma Theta in 1988.)
**Mu Beta**	1991	University of Alabama in Huntsville	Huntsville	Alabama	Active	(Note: Chapter originated as Sigma Chi Gamma in 1987.)
Mu Gamma	1992–2014	University of North Carolina Wilmington	Wilmington	North Carolina	Inactive	(Note: Chapter originated as Sigma Phi Sigma in 1989.)
Mu Delta	1992–200x ?	Temple University	Philadelphia	Pennsylvania	Inactive	(Note: Chapter originated as Phi Chi Sigma in 1990.)
Mu Epsilon	1992–xxxx ?	Coastal Carolina University	Conway	South Carolina	Inactive	(Note: Chapter originated as Kappa Tau Omega in 1991.)
**Mu Zeta**	1992–200x ?, 2012	Rochester Institute of Technology	Rochester	New York	Active	(Note: Chapter originated as Sigma Kappa Tau in 1982. After going dormant, it was reformed as a colony in 2010.)
**Mu Eta**	1993	University of North Carolina at Asheville	Asheville	North Carolina	Active	
Mu Theta	1994–xxxx ?	University of Texas at San Antonio	San Antonio	Texas	Inactive	(Note: Chapter originated as Gamma Chi in 1991.)
**Mu Iota**	1994	University of Hartford	West Hartford	Connecticut	Active	
**Mu Kappa**	1994	Southeast Missouri State University	Cape Girardeau	Missouri	Active	
Mu Lambda	1995–2008	Southern Illinois University	Carbondale	Illinois	Inactive	
Mu Mu	1996–200x ?	Sam Houston State University	Huntsville	Texas	Inactive	
Mu Nu	1996–2021	Valdosta State University	Valdosta	Georgia	Inactive	
**Mu Xi**	1996	Columbus State University	Columbus	Georgia	Active	
Mu Omicron	1996–2004	Pepperdine University	Malibu	California	Inactive	(Note: Chapter originated as Sigma Phi in 1992.)
**Mu Pi**	1996	Thomas Jefferson University	Philadelphia	Pennsylvania	Active	(Note: Known as Philadelphia University when its chapter was established, that school merged with Thomas Jefferson University in 2017.)
**Mu Rho**	1997	Northwestern State University	Natchitoches	Louisiana	Active	
Mu Sigma	1999–20xx ?	McKendree University	Lebanon	Illinois	Inactive	(Note: Chapter originated as Chi Sigma Gamma in 1996.)
**Mu Tau**	2002	University of Central Oklahoma	Edmond	Oklahoma	Active	
**Mu Upsilon**	2003–2006, 2009	Stephen F. Austin State University	Nacogdoches	Texas	Active	
Mu Phi	2003	Longwood University	Farmville	Virginia	Inactive	
**Mu Chi**	2003	University of Lynchburg	Lynchburg	Virginia	Active	(Note: Chapter originated as Men of Action (local) in 2001.)
Mu Psi	2005–2020	University of Central Florida	Orlando	Florida	Inactive	
**Nu Alpha**	2008	University of Arkansas–Fort Smith	Fort Smith	Arkansas	Active	
**Nu Beta**	2010	Huntingdon College	Montgomery	Alabama	Active	
Nu Gamma	2011–201x ?	Pennsylvania College of Technology	Williamsport	Pennsylvania	Inactive	
Nu Delta	2016-2023	High Point University	High Point	North Carolina	Inactive	
**Nu Epsilon**	2020	University of Tennessee at Chattanooga	Chattanooga	Tennessee	Active	
