= Bellefontaine Cemetery =

Cemetery in St. Louis, Missouri

Bellefontaine Cemetery and Arboretum
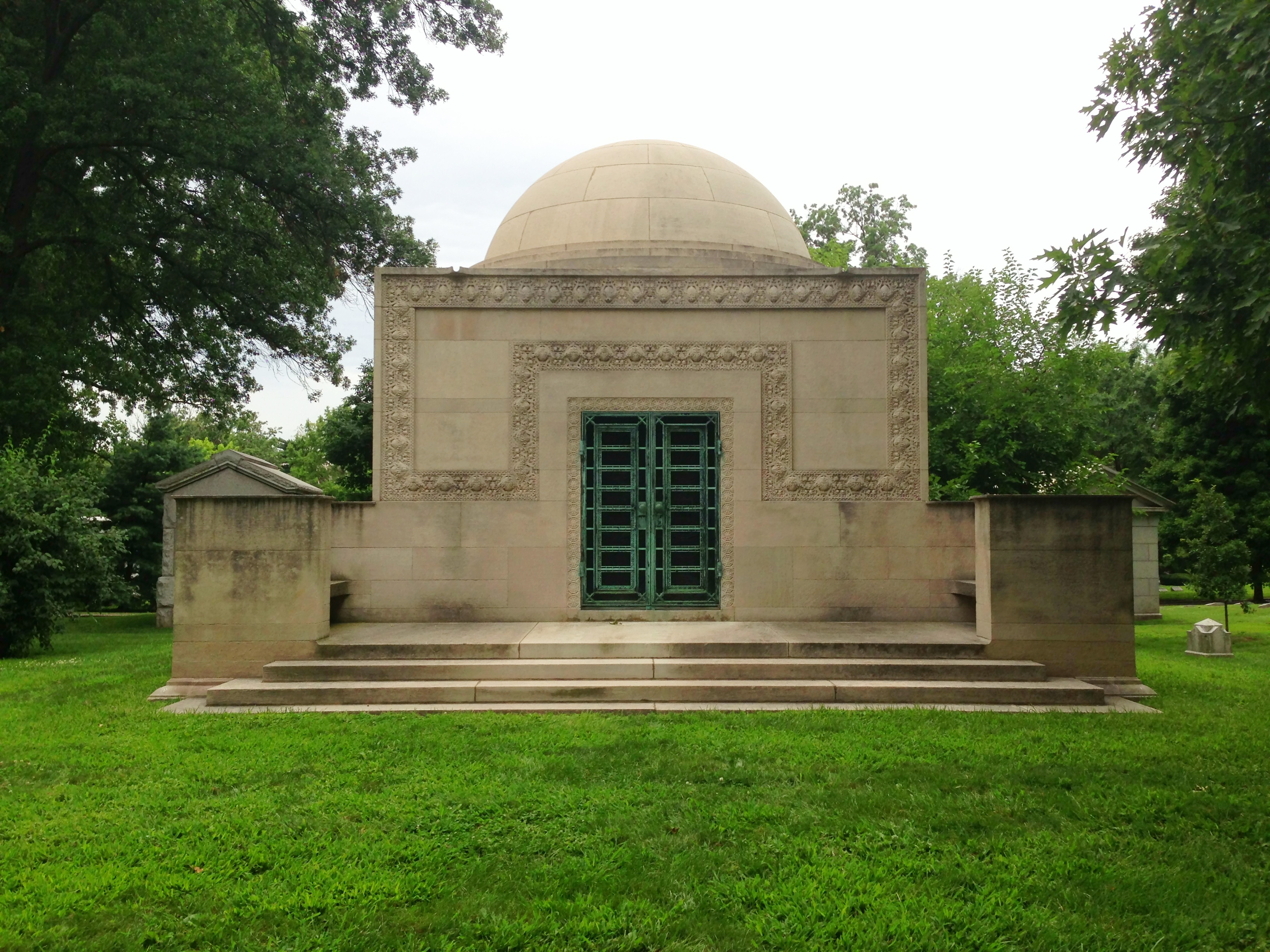
- The Wainwright Tomb is on the National Register of Historic Places.
- Interactive map of Bellefontaine Cemetery and Arboretum

Details
- Established: 1849; 177 years ago
- Location: 4947 West Florissant Avenue, St. Louis, Missouri, U.S.
- Country: United States
- Coordinates: 38.69737°N 90.23363°W
- Type: Public
- Size: 314 acres (127 ha)
- No. of graves: 87,000
- Website: bellefontainecemetery.org

Bellefontaine Cemetery and Arboretum is a nonprofit, non-sectarian cemetery and arboretum in St. Louis, Missouri, United States. Founded in 1849 as a rural cemetery, Bellefontaine has several architecturally significant monuments and mausoleums such as the Louis Sullivan-designed Wainwright Tomb, which is listed on the National Register of Historic Places.

The cemetery contains 314 acres (1.27 km^{2}) of land and over 87,000 graves, including those of William Clark, Adolphus Busch, Thomas Hart Benton, Rush Limbaugh, and William S. Burroughs. It has many Union and Confederate soldiers from the American Civil War, and local and state politicians. It has the largest collection of private and family mausoleums and sarcophagi in Missouri.

== Overview ==
The cemetery contains the graves of many prominent American pioneers, businesspeople, politicians, and generals who are significant figures in the history of St. Louis and the United States. Its oldest graves are from 1816, located on pioneer Edward Hempstead's family lot. Many of the wealthiest families at Bellefontaine have ornate mausoleums which overlook the Mississippi River and have Classical, Romanesque, Gothic, and Egyptian architectural styles. Mausoleums include the Wainwright Tomb, designed for Charlotte Dickson Wainwright by the famed Chicago school architect Louis Sullivan in 1892; the Busch Mausoleum, designed for Adolphus Busch and Lilly Anheuser by Barnett, Haynes & Barnett in 1915; and the Brown Brothers Mausoleums, designed in 1910 by Isaac Taylor and in 1928 by Mauran, Russell and Crowell. Many of the several large family plots are marked by tall obelisk monuments with elaborate bases. Guided tours of the cemetery's main historical and architectural highlights are open to the public. Visitors can also obtain self-guided tour brochures at the cemetery office.

== History ==
=== 19th century ===
On March 7, 1849, banker William McPherson and lawyer John Fletcher Darby assembled a group of some of St. Louis's most prominent citizens to found the Rural Cemetery Association of St. Louis. This association sought to respond to the needs of the rapidly growing city by establishing a new cemetery several miles outside city limits. St. Louis was experiencing huge population growth during this time and city leaders thought that the existing graveyards, which were mostly concentrated along Jefferson Avenue near the city center, were an impediment to urban development. Many were also convinced that city cemeteries represented a public health hazard, as with miasma theory. These problems were compounded during mid-1849, when a cholera pandemic killed more than 4,000 people in the city. With existing cemeteries running out of space, and with many residents fearing that fumes from nearby cemeteries could cause them to fall ill, the drive to create a new cemetery gained pace.

In 1849, the Rural Cemetery Association purchased the former Hempstead family farm five miles northwest of the city, with the intent to turn it into a large rural cemetery, modeled after Père Lachaise Cemetery in Paris and Mount Auburn Cemetery in Massachusetts. The association initially called it Rural Cemetery, but because the 138-acre (56 ha) Hempstead farm was along the road to Fort Belle Fontaine, ultimately named it after the fort.

Within a few months, the Association had hired landscape architect Almerin Hotchkiss, who helped design Green-Wood Cemetery in Brooklyn, to begin drafting and implementing a master plan for Bellefontaine. Hotchkiss became superintendent of the cemetery for the next 46 years, designed most of Bellefontaine's roadways and landscaping, and oversaw maintenance of the grounds.

The first burial at Bellefontaine Cemetery was on April 27, 1850, and the official dedication was several weeks later. Older graves within St. Louis were reinterred to Bellefontaine, including some from the cemetery by the Old Cathedral near the Mississippi River. Bellefontaine had graves of several victims of the 1855 Gasconade Bridge train disaster, the worst railroad disaster in Missouri history. Several brewing families are interred, including the Anheusers, Buschs, Lemps, and Griesediecks.

The cemetery steadily acquired more land for growth and, by 1865, had reached its permanent size of 314 acres (127 ha).

=== 20th century ===
In 1909, the St. Louis architectural firm Eames & Young was commissioned to design a new chapel.

=== 21st century ===
The Hotchkiss Chapel, named for the cemetery's first architect, was renovated in 2009, and an indoor columbarium was added on the back. The chapel is used for weddings and memorial services. A new lakeside garden and columbarium were completed in 2010. Two new outdoor columbaria have opened for inurnments, and a green burial natural interment section is planned. With more than 100 acres (40 ha) of open, unused land, the cemetery has room for traditional casketed and vaulted ground burial for 200 years at current rates of usage. Some of this extra land has been converted into prairie and woodland.

As of 2012, Bellefontaine Cemetery contained more than 87,000 graves, with about 100 added each year. It contains over 14 miles (23 km) of paved roads and has more than 180 species of trees and shrubs in an accredited arboretum.

The cemetery was listed on the National Register of Historic Places in 2014.

== Notable burials ==
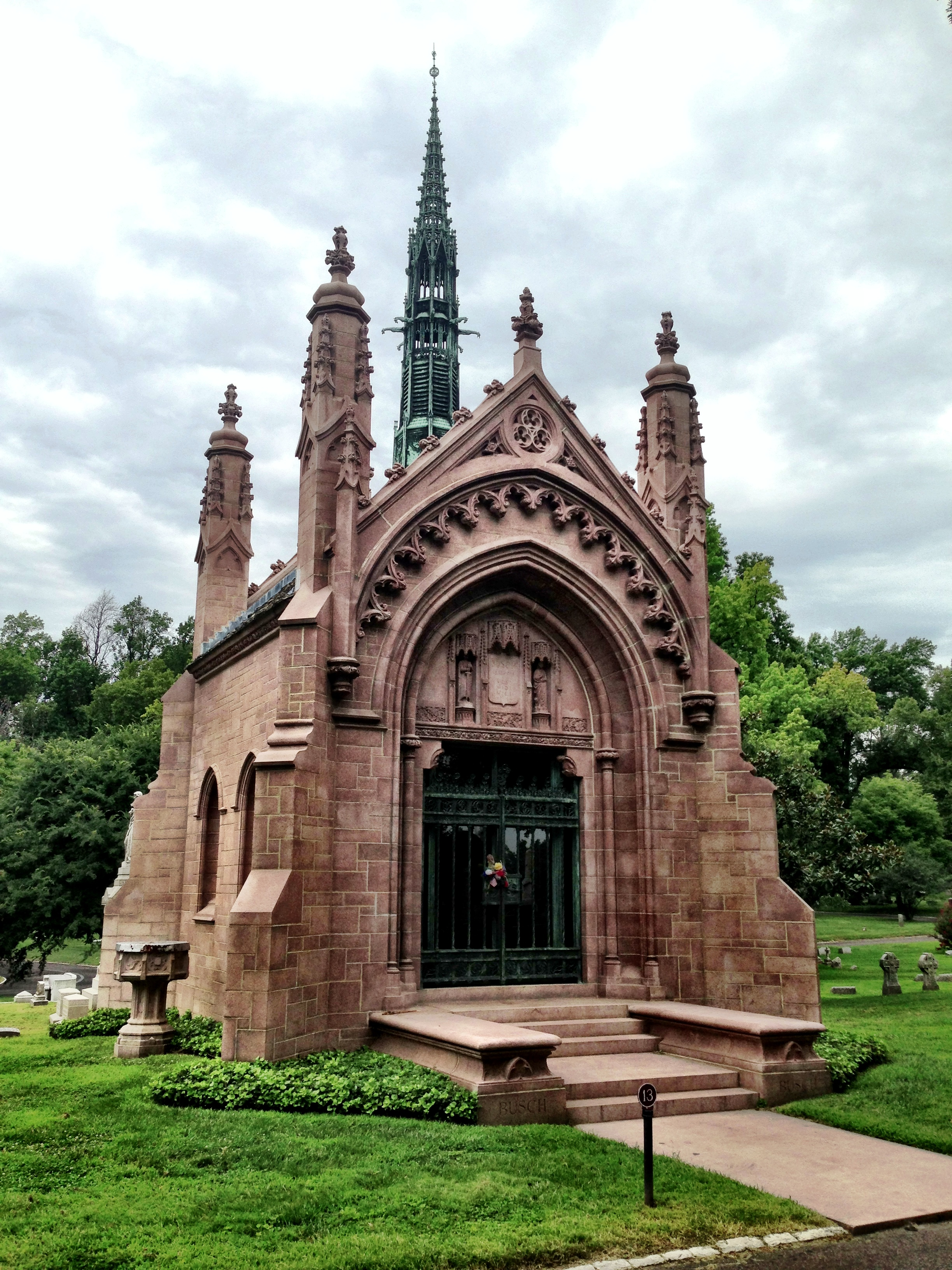
Busch Mausoleum, designed by Barnett, Haynes & Barnett

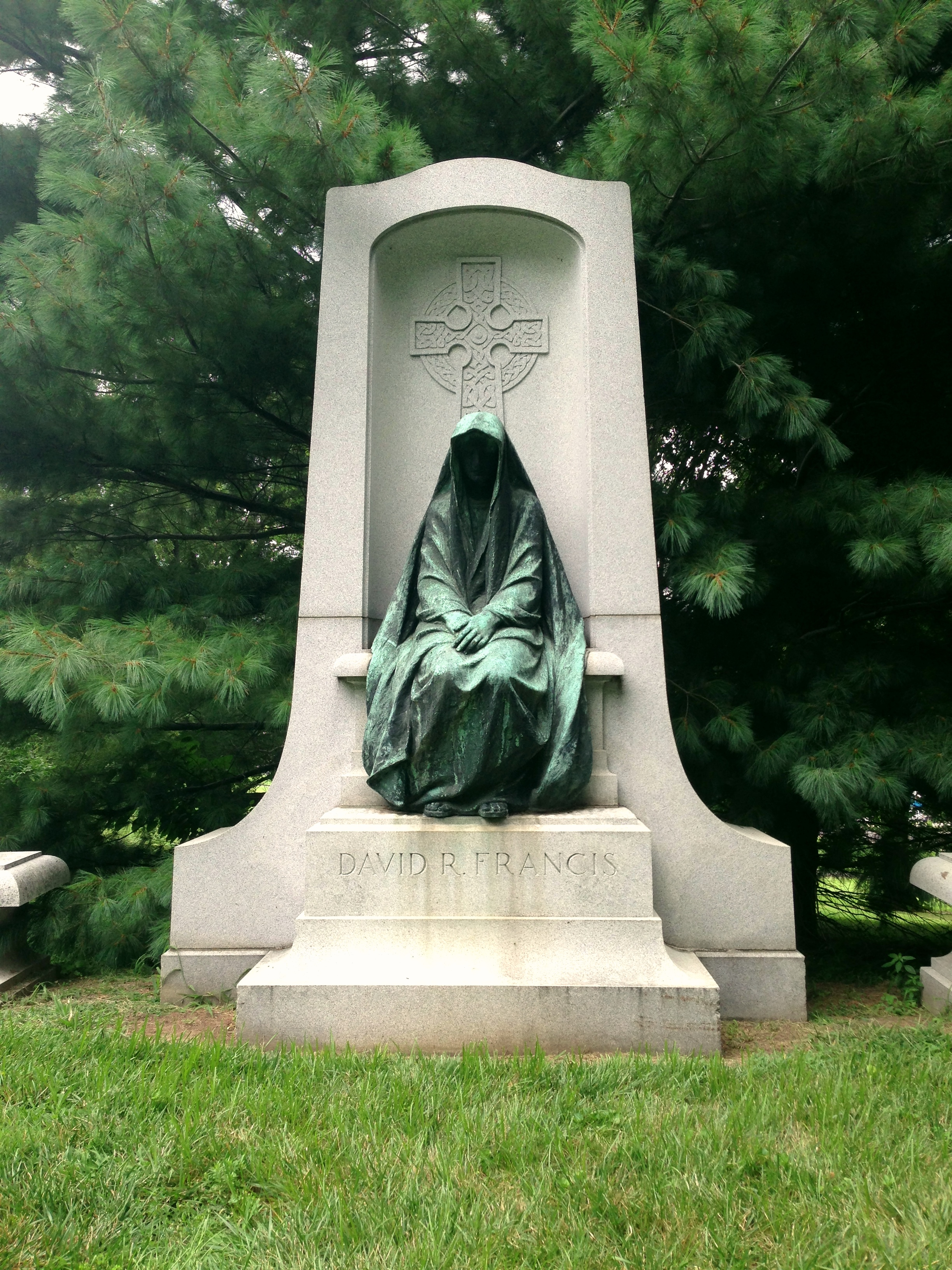
David R. Francis

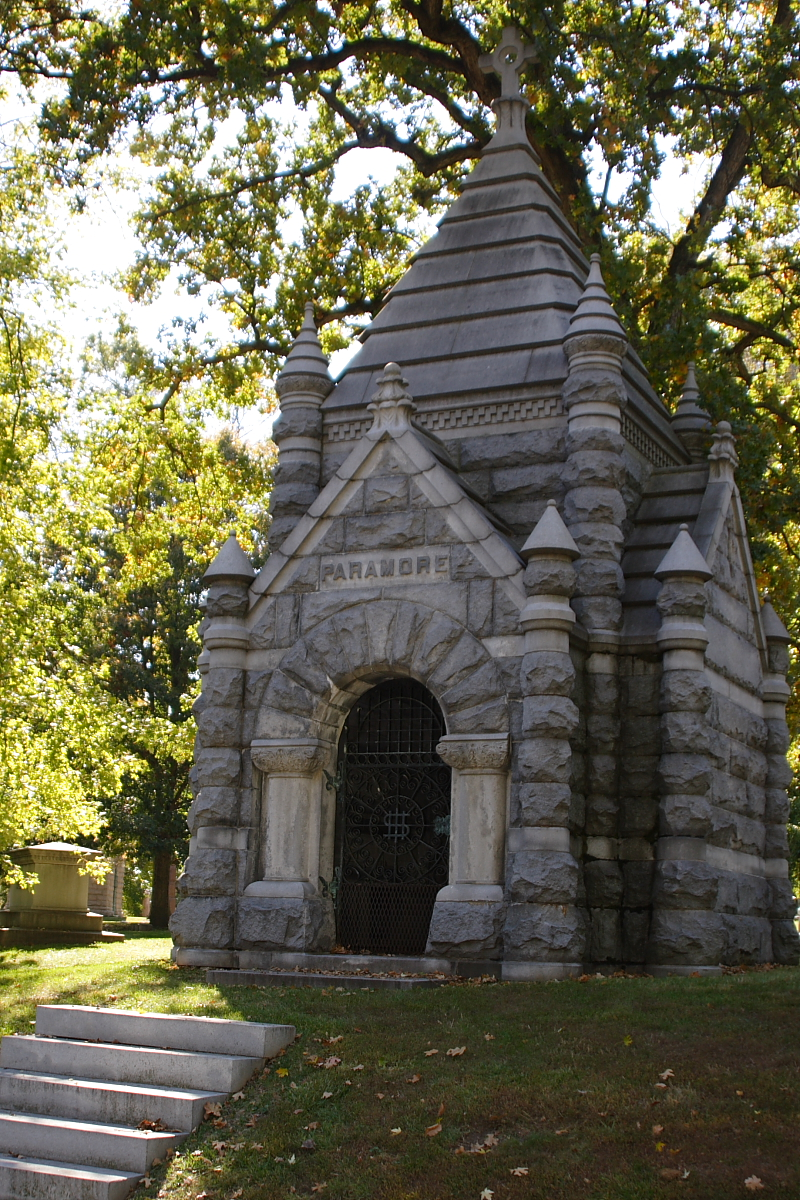
Paramore Mausoleum

=== A–K ===
- Chris von der Ahe (1851–1913), entrepreneur and owner of the St. Louis Brown Stockings, which later became the St. Louis Cardinals
- John R. Anderson (minister) (1818–1863), an American minister from St. Louis, Missouri, who fought against slavery and for education for his fellow African Americans.
- Eberhard Anheuser (1805–1880), father-in-law of Adolphus Busch; president and CEO of Eberhard Anheuser and Company (predecessor of Anheuser-Busch)
- Charles Balmer (1817–1892), German-born American musician
- George I. Barnett (1815–1898), prominent St. Louis architect
- Edward Bates (1793–1869), United States Attorney General under President Abraham Lincoln
- William Beaumont (1785–1853), U.S. Army surgeon, known as the "Father of Gastric Physiology" due to his research on human digestion
- Robert Benecke (1835–1903), early St. Louis photographer
- Thomas Hart Benton (1782–1858), prominent U.S. Senator (1821–1851) who championed western expansion and the Homestead Act
- Mary Odilia Berger, S.S.M (April 30, 1823 – October 17, 1880), Founder of the Sisters of St. Mary in 1872 in St. Louis, which established and still runs hospitals throughout the Midwestern United States.
- Thekla M. Bernays (1856–1931), Women's suffrage's activist, author and lecturer.
- Daniel Bissell (1768–1833) U.S. Army officer in War of 1812 and on the American Frontier
- Horace Bixby (1826–1912), steamboat pilot and captain whose "cub pilot" was Mark Twain
- Francis Preston Blair Jr. (1821–1875), Union Army general in the Civil War, politician
- Susan Blow (1843–1916), educator, known as the "Mother of Kindergarten"
- Benjamin Bonneville (1796–1876), French-born officer in the U.S. Army, fur trapper, and explorer in the American West
- James B. Bowlin (1804–1874), U.S. Representative of Missouri
- Henry Clay Brockmeyer (1826–1906), poet, politician, philosopher
- Robert S. Brookings (1850–1932), businessman and philanthropist, founder of the Brookings Institution, donor to Washington University in St. Louis
- Don Carlos Buell (1818–1898), U.S. Army general; led Union armies in the battles of Shiloh and Perryville
- William Seward Burroughs (1857–1898), inventor of the mechanical calculator and founder of Burroughs Corporation
- William S. Burroughs (1914–1997), author of novel Naked Lunch, icon of Beat Generation
- Adolphus Busch (1838–1913), founder of Anheuser Busch Company
  - wife Lilly Eberhard Anheuser (d. 1928)
- Isidor Bush (1822–1898), intellectual, publisher, viticulturalist
- James Gay Butler (1840–1916), tobacco manufacturer, major supporter of Lindenwood University
- Given Campbell (1835–1906), Confederate officer who led the final escape of Jefferson Davis in the last days of the Civil War
- Robert Campbell (1804–1879), frontiersman, banker, real estate mogul, steamboat owner
- Virginia Kyle Campbell (1822–1882), socialite, wife of Robert Campbell
- William Chauvenet (1820–1870), scholar, educator
- William Clark (1770–1838), explorer of Louisiana Purchase territory
- Norman Jay Coleman (1827–1911), first United States Secretary of Agriculture
- Alban Jasper Conant (1821–1915), artist, author, educator; best known for his "Smiling Lincoln" portraits
- Phoebe Wilson Couzins (1842–1913), pioneer suffragette, one of the first female lawyers in the United States
- Ned Cuthbert (1845–1905), baseball player
- Forrest C. Donnell (1884–1980), U.S. Senator, 40th Governor of the State of Missouri
- James Eads (1820–1887), engineer who constructed bridges, railroads, and ironclad warships
- Albert Gallatin Edwards (1812–1892), Assistant Secretary of the U.S. Treasury under President of the United States Abraham Lincoln and founder of brokerage firm A. G. Edwards
- Charles Henry Galloway (1871–1931), church and concert organist, conductor, and music educator
- William Greenleaf Eliot (1811–1887), Unitarian minister and civic leader
- George Engelmann (1809–1884), botanist
- Sarkis Erganian (1870–1950), Ottoman Armenian painter
- Bernard G. Farrar Jr. (1831–1916), Union Army colonel in the Civil War
- Thomas Clement Fletcher (1827–1899), 18th Governor of the State of Missouri, issued the proclamation abolishing slavery in the state
- Della May Fox (1870–1913), actress, singer
- David R. Francis (1850–1927), statesman, United States Secretary of the Interior, governor of Missouri, mayor of St. Louis, ambassador to Russia, president of the 1904 St. Louis World's Fair
- Pierce P. Furber (1853–1893), architect with the firm Peabody and Stearns
- Hamilton Rowan Gamble (1798–1864), 16th Governor of the State of Missouri during the Civil War, chief justice of the Missouri Supreme Court at the time of the Dred Scott Decision in 1852
- Frederick D. Gardner (1869–1933), 34th Governor of the State of Missouri and St. Louis funeral director and coffin manufacturer
- Edward James Gay (1816–1889), U.S. Representative of Louisiana
- Jessie Gaynor (1863–1921), composer of children's music
- Mary Olstine Graham (1842–1902) leader of the largest normal school in Argentina
- Fitz W. Guerin (1846–1903), Medal of Honor recipient in the American Civil War
- Rebecca N. Hazard (1826–1912), first president of the American Woman's Suffrage Association (1826) to reside west of the Mississippi River
- Edward Hempstead (1780–1817), lawyer, pioneer, delegate to the U.S. House of Representatives for Missouri Territory (1812–1814)
- James Eads How (1874–1930), son of wealthy St. Louis family, known as the "Millionaire Hobo"
- Benjamin Howard (1760–1814), first governor of Missouri Territory, brigadier general in the War of 1812
- Bill Joyce (baseball) (1865–1941), professional baseball player and manager
- Stephen W. Kearny (1794–1848), officer in the U.S. Army; played a significant role in the Mexican–American War and the conquest of California
- George Kessler (1862–1923), landscape architect and city planner
- John Krum (1810–1883) was a lawyer, jurist, and mayor of St. Louis

=== L–Z ===
- Albert Bond Lambert (1875–1946), businessman, aviator, Olympic athlete; namesake of Lambert–St. Louis International Airport
- Frederick William Lehmann (1853–1931), prominent lawyer, statesman, United States Solicitor General, rare book collector
- Rush Limbaugh (1951–2021), nationwide radio show host, Presidential Medal of Freedom recipient, inductee to the National Radio Hall of Fame and the National Association of Broadcasters Hall of Fame.
- Theodore Link (1850–1923), architect of St. Louis Union Station
- Manuel Lisa (1772–1820), fur trader and explorer
- Mark Littell (1953–2022), baseball player
- Susan Louise Marsh (1867–1946), activist and children's advocate
- Richard Barnes Mason (1797–1850), U.S. Army officer, fifth military governor of California before it became a U.S. state
- William Massie (1829–1910), riverboat captain famous for living with the bullet that killed Wild Bill Hickok lodged in his wrist.
- James Smith McDonnell (1899–1980), founder of McDonnell Aircraft Corporation
- John McNeil (1813–1891), Union Army general in the Civil War
- Mary Meachum (1801–1869), and her husband, John Berry Meachum (1789–1854), American abolitionists
- James F. Merton (1845–1900), Medal of Honor recipient for actions during the 1871 United States expedition to Korea.
- John Miller (1781–1846), Fourth Governor of the State of Missouri
- Virginia Minor (1824–1894), women's suffrage activist
- Lou Wall Moore (c. 1860–1924), American sculptor, stage actress, costume designer, dancer, and socialite
- Charles Nagel (1849–1940), U.S. Representative, last United States Secretary of Commerce and Labor, co-founder of the United States Chamber of Commerce
- Henry D. O'Brien (1842–1902), American Civil War Medal of Honor recipient
- John O'Fallon (1791–1865), railroad executive, philanthropist, namesake of O'Fallon, Missouri and O'Fallon, Illinois, nephew of William Clark
- Henry Overstolz (1821–1887), 24th Mayor of St. Louis
- Parrish Sisters, Williamina (1879–1941) and Grace Parrish (1882–1954), respected photographers who worked in team as The Parrish Sisters; also members of the early 20th century artistic group The Potters
- John Mason Peck (1789–1858), Baptist missionary, educator and journalist
- Hannah D. Pittman (1840–1919), author of the first American comic opera.
- Truston Polk (1811–1876), U.S. Senator (1857–1862) and 12th Governor of the State of Missouri
- John Pope (1822–1892), Union Army general in the Civil War, known for his defeat at the Second Battle of Bull Run
- Sterling Price (1809–1867), Confederate Army major general during the Civil War, U.S. Army brigadier general during the Mexican–American War, 11th Governor of the State of Missouri
- John G. Priest (1822–1900), real estate dealer, philanthropist, first St. Louis Veiled Prophet
- Adele L. Rand, (1899–1994), racehorse owner, philanthropist
- James McIlvaine Riley (1849–1911), co-founder of Sigma Nu International Fraternity
- Caroline Risque (1883–1952), American painter and sculptor, member of The Potters
- Irma S. Rombauer (1877–1962), author of The Joy of Cooking
- Henry Miller Shreve (1785–1851), steamboat pioneer, inventor, and namesake of Shreveport, Louisiana
- Henry A. Silver (1826–1885), Maryland state delegate
- Luther Ely Smith (1873–1951), founder of Gateway Arch National Park
- Theodore Spiering (1871–1925), violinist, conductor, and teacher
- Sara Teasdale (1884–1933), Pulitzer Prize-winning poet and member of The Potters
- Augustus Thomas (1857–1934), playwright
- M. Louise Thomas (1851–1947), founder of Lenox Hall, St. Louis
- John H. Tice (1809–1883), weather predictor, writer, and educator
- Susan Paul Vashon (1838–1912), educator, abolitionist and clubwoman
- George Graham Vest (1830–1904), U.S. Senator, Confederate Congressman, U.S. Congressman from Missouri
- Ellis Wainwright (1850–1924), businessman; famous for the Wainwright Building in downtown St. Louis; buried in Louis Sullivan's 1892 Wainwright Tomb with his wife, Charlotte
- Rosa Kershaw Walker (1840s–1909), author, journalist, editor
- Perry Werden (1860s–1934), baseball player and former home run record holder

== See also ==
- Union Cemetery, founded at the same time and purpose in Kansas City, Missouri
- List of cemeteries in Missouri
- List of United States cemeteries
- List of mausoleums
- Calvary Cemetery (St. Louis)
