= James McIlvaine Riley =

American civil engineer and fraternity founder (1849–1911)

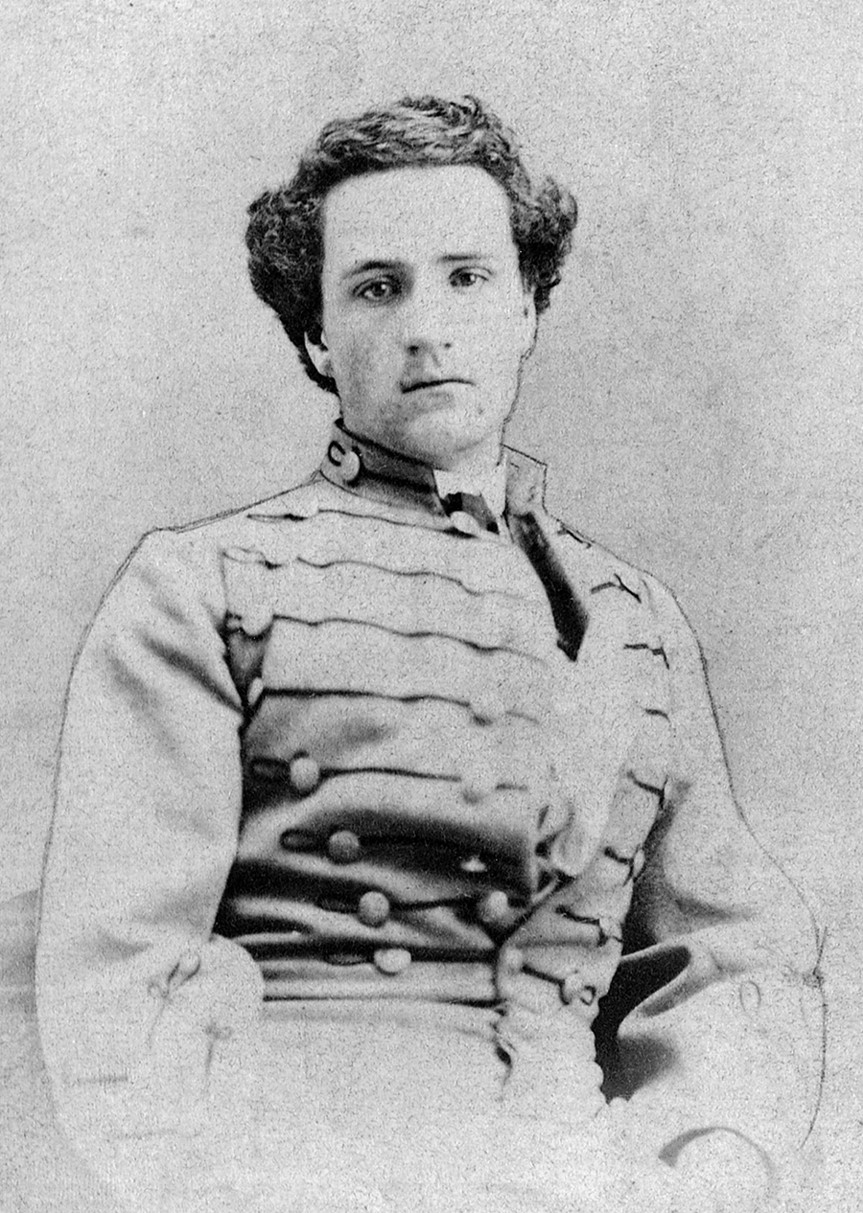
- Born: May 16, 1849; St. Louis, Missouri US
- Died: May 6, 1911 (aged 61); St. Louis, Missouri US
- Burial place: Bellefontaine Cemetery, St. Louis, Missouri
- Other name: Mac Riley
- Education: Virginia Military Institute
- Occupation: Civil Engineer
- Employer(s): United States Army Corps of Engineers City of St. Louis Wabash Railroad

James McIlvaine "Mac" Riley (May 16, 1849 – May 6, 1911) was an American civil engineer and fraternity founder. He worked for the United States Army Corps of Engineers on the Mississippi River and was a surveyor with the City of St. Louis. While in college at the Virginia Military Institute, he was one of the founders of the Sigma Nu fraternity.

== Early life ==
Riley was born in St. Louis, Missouri, on May 16, 1849. His parents were Ann Chichester Sandford (née Tapscott) and James McIlvaine Riley Sr., a grocer and commission merchant with the firm Riley & Christy. His father died on November 26, 1848, before Riley's birth. His mother gave her right to her husband's estate to her stepfather, William R. Campbell. Campbell was also named legal guardian to Riley.

On December 30, 1852, Riley's mother married Clinton Odell Dutcher, a commission merchant. The couple had four children; Riley's oldest half-sibling was seven years his junior. When Campbell died in 1855, Dutcher uncle, Isaac Van Wert Dutcher, became Riley's new guardian.

Riley enrolled in the Virginia Military Institute (VMI) on October 4, 1866. His cousin, Marshall McDonald, was an adjunct professor of chemistry, mineralogy and geology at VMI. Riley was a member of VMI's first baseball team in the fall of 1866, playing second base and eventually serving as the team's captain.

While at VMI, James Frank Hopkins, Greenfield Quarles and Riley became close friends and founded Sigma Nu fraternity on January 1, 1869. Riley was elected the first Commander (or president) of the chapter in the spring of 1869. He was reelected as Commander for the 1869 to 1870 academic year.

Riley studied, engineering, geology, and mineralogy at VMI. He graduated from VMI on July 4, 1870. He helped plan the commencement ceremony as a member of the Committee of Arrangements.

== Career ==
After college, Riley worked in a salt mine in Warfield, Kentucky. In 1871, he was hired to work in the engineering department of the Wabash Railroad, leading to jobs with the Missouri and Texas Railroad and the Pacific Railway between 1871 and 1878. He went to Salt Lake City, Utah between 1874 and 1876 where he worked in mine development.

In 1878, Riley began working as a civilian with the United States Army Corps of Engineers. He was engaged to work on improvements on the Mississippi River. He worked for the City of St. Louis as a surveyor with the street department. He rotated between these two jobs for twenty years. He retired for health reasons.

== Personal life ==
Riley was elected as the first regent or national president of Sigma Nu fraternity in 1870; he was reelected to a second five-year term in 1875. He was the longest-serving regent in the fraternity's history, serving ten years from 1870 to 1880. The fraternity began holding chapter meetings in 1884; however, Riley never attended one of these meetings, including those in St. Louis in 1892 and 1896. Before the 1902 grand chapter meeting in Indianapolis, he wrote, "I will be with you do I not have nervous prostration; in other words: I live very quietly and so am fearsome of results; not being accustomed to attend functions of any kind. This is why I hesitated to try and be one of you."

Riley never married and did not have any children. He lived in St. Louis after retiring. He checked into the U.S. Marine Hospital in St. Louis on April 17, 1911, and was treated for stomatitis. On May 6, 1911, Riley died in the hospital of gangrene of the mouth at age 61. He was buried in Bellefontaine Cemetery in St. Louis. Six Sigma Nu brothers were pallbearers and placed white roses on his grave.

Riley's Sigma Nu badge was added to the fraternity's archives. The fraternity installed a monument at his grave in 1919.
