= Greenfield Quarles =

American fraternity founder (1847–1921)

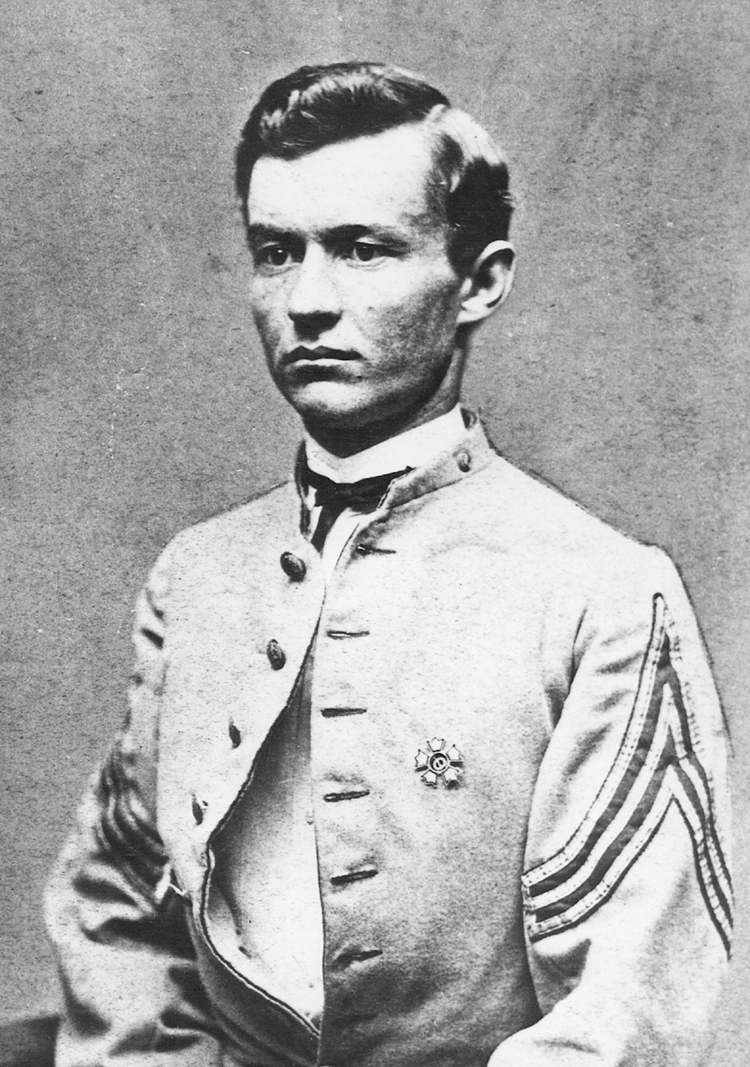
- Greenfield Quarles in Virginia Military Institute uniform
- Born: April 1, 1847; Christian County, Kentucky, US
- Died: January 14, 1921 (aged 73); Helena, Arkansas, US
- Resting place: Maple Hill Cemetery; 34.54280°N 90.59080°W
- Education: Virginia Military Institute
- Occupations: Lawyer, judge, soldier
- Known for: Founder of the Sigma Nu Fraternity
- Spouse: Ida Gist
- Children: One daughter
- Parent: John Nicholas Quarles
- Military career
- Allegiance: Confederate States of America; United States
- Branch: Confederate States Army; United States Army
- Rank: Private (Confederate States Army); Major (United States Army, Arkansas Volunteer Infantry)

Greenfield Quarles (April 1, 1847 – January 14, 1921) was a Confederate States Army and United States Army soldier, judge, and one of the founders of the Sigma Nu fraternity. He was a member of the Arkansas Senate.

== Early life ==
Born in Christian County, Kentucky, his family moved to Arkansas in 1851. Quarles was a graduate of the Virginia Military Institute. During his time there, along with James Frank Hopkins and James McIlvaine Riley founded the Sigma Nu Fraternity. In 1873, Quarles married his wife Ida Gist and had a daughter. In his early professional life, Quarles was a public servant having been elected a first district prosecuting attorney, a county judge, and probate judge.

== Military service ==
Quarles served in the Confederate States Army during the civil war as a Private. After the war, he became a charter member of Camp Cawley of the United Confederate Veterans of Helena, Arkansas.

During the Spanish–American War, Quarles volunteered with the Arkansas Volunteer Infantry (Arkansas State Guard and the Spanish–American War) when called upon by the United States Army as a Major. Quarles did not participate in any battles in Cuba during the war.

During World War I, Quarles served as a special agent to the United States Government.

== Death ==
Quarles died at his home in Helena, Arkansas.
