= Virginia Campbell =

Virginia Campbell may refer to:

- Virginia Kyle Campbell (1822–1882), American socialite
- Virginia McLaurin (1909–2022), born Virginia Campbell, American community volunteer and seamstress
