= Southern Hotel (St. Louis) =

Hotel in St. Louis, Missouri, United States

Coordinates: 38.624242°N 90.189320°W

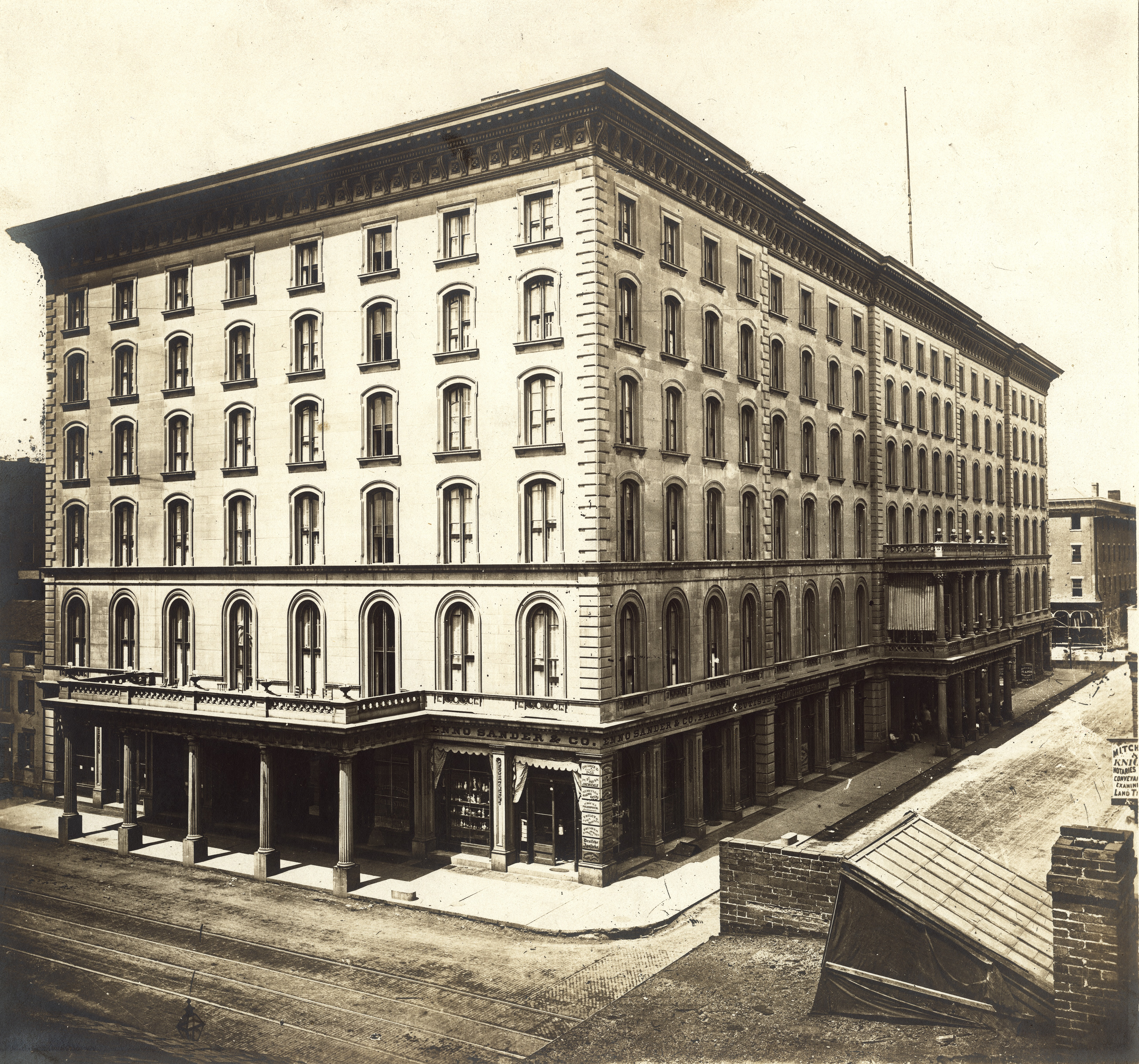
Southern Hotel on the southwest corner of Fourth and Walnut Streets, 1868

The Southern Hotel was a historic hotel located at the corner of 4th Street and Walnut Street and stretching between 4th and 5th Streets in St. Louis, Missouri. The building was built at the location of the Old Southern Hotel which burned in 1877. This 1877 hotel fire and the loss of life that occurred here made this the worst hotel disaster in St. Louis history. The new Southern Hotel had white marble, extensive fresco work, a rotunda, and a wide promenade. The hotel was owned by Robert G. Campbell who had a close friendship with President Grant.

The hotel was closed in 1912 as newer and larger hotels were built further west. The hotel was torn down in 1933. The National Register of Historic Places, the official United States list of the historic places worthy of preservation, was not authorized until over 30 years later in 1966.
