= Given Campbell =

American lawyer

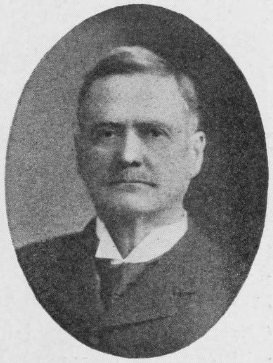
- Born: December 1, 1835; Salem, Kentucky
- Died: November 20, 1906 (aged 70); Saint Louis, Missouri
- Burial place: Bellefontaine Cemetery
- Military career
- Allegiance: Missouri; Kentucky; Confederate States of America
- Branch: Confederate States Army
- Service years: 1861 (Missouri Militia); 1861 (Kentucky Cavalry); 1861–1865 (CSA)
- Rank: Captain (Missouri Militia); Captain (CSA)
- Conflicts: American Civil War: Camp Jackson Affair; Battle of Pea Ridge; Battle of Chickamauga

Given Campbell (December 1, 1835 – November 20, 1906) was a Confederate officer best known for leading the final escape of Jefferson Davis in the last days of the Civil War.

== Early life ==
Campbell was born at Salem, Kentucky, to James and Mary (Given) Campbell. Reared in Kentucky, he received his college education at Centre College, Danville, Kentucky and then went to the University of Virginia Law School. Soon after leaving university, he came to St. Louis to begin practicing law and was, for a short time, in the office of Charles D. Drake, later a U.S. Senator from Missouri, and he was admitted to the bar in 1856.

== Civil War ==
When tension over secession increased, Campbell enlisted in the 2nd Regiment Missouri Volunteer Militia under Col. John S. Bowen. He then was elected captain by the 53-member Company "G". In April 1861 Governor Claiborne Fox Jackson announced a statewide militia muster for early May to gather for their yearly drill and training at a place just outside the city limits of St Louis located at Lindell's Grove ostensibly known as Camp Jackson. On May 10, 1861, Campbell and 676 other militia men were captured and taken prisoner by Union Captain Nathaniel Lyon and his combined U.S. Army and Home Guard forces. After receiving his parole, Campbell returned to Kentucky where he enlisted as a private in Company "B", 15th Kentucky Cavalry. Soon he was promoted to captain of the company.

Campbell entered the Confederate Army under General Sterling Price, and served through the war as a cavalryman under Generals Morgan, Forrest, and Wheeler. In the later days of the war, Campbell would serve in Basil Duke's command in the Virginia theater. Following Lee's surrender at Appomattox, Campbell was hand selected by President Jefferson Davis to lead Davis' escape and to choose a few members of Duke's Cavalry brigade to protect his person. Campbell along with the rest of the escort and Davis were captured at Irwinville, Georgia on May 10, 1865.

== Post-War activities ==
Given Campbell came back to St. Louis in 1865 and married Susan Elizabeth Woods, daughter of Robert K. and Susan Woods. He found it impossible to practice law in Missouri because of the new "test oath" in the 1865 Drake constitution. He moved to New Orleans where he practiced law and served as a member of the National Democratic Convention of 1872. He came back to Saint Louis in the fall of 1873 and continued in active practice until 1905.

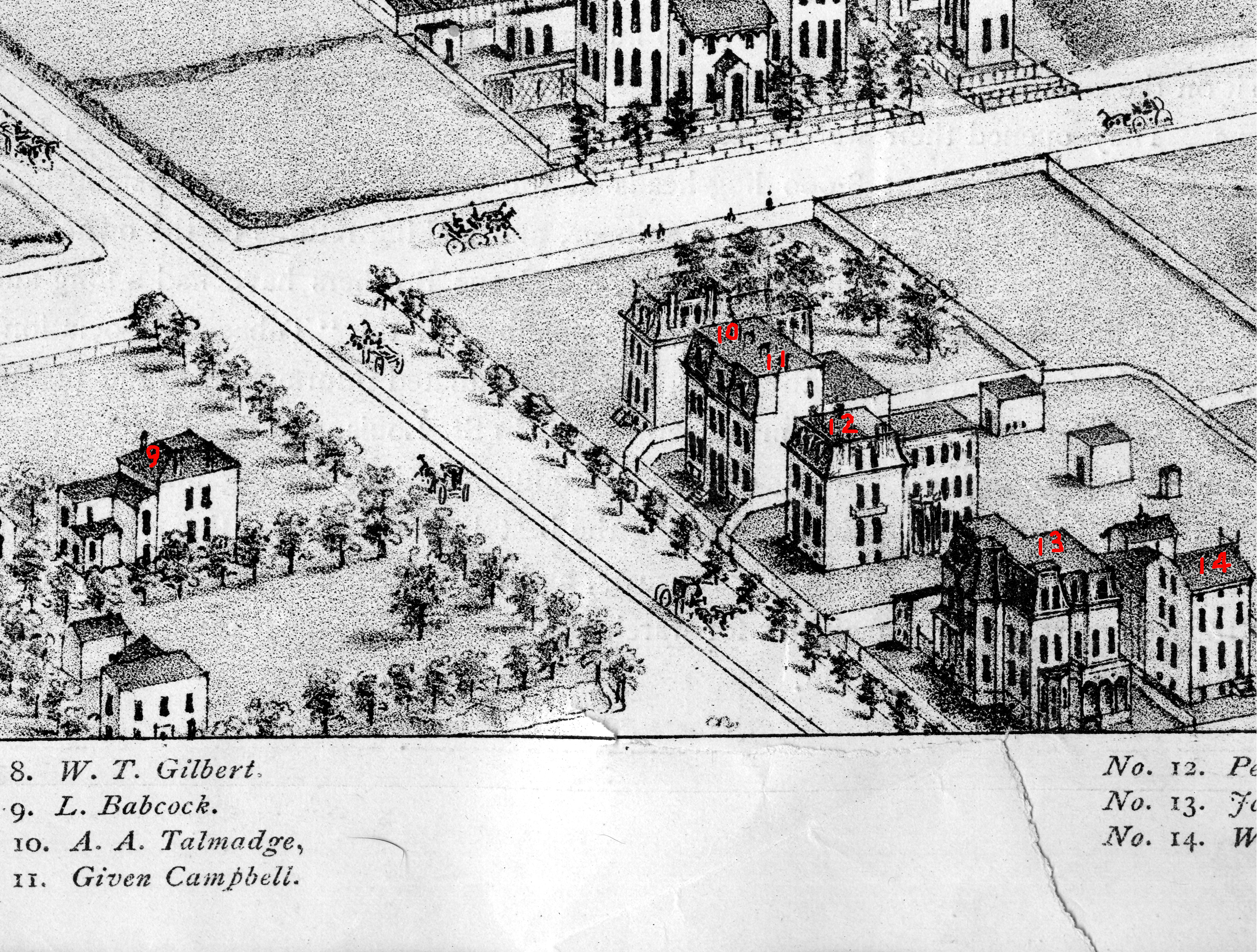
Given Campbell's house on Laffaette Street near Jefferson Ave in the book Pictorial Saint Louis (1876)

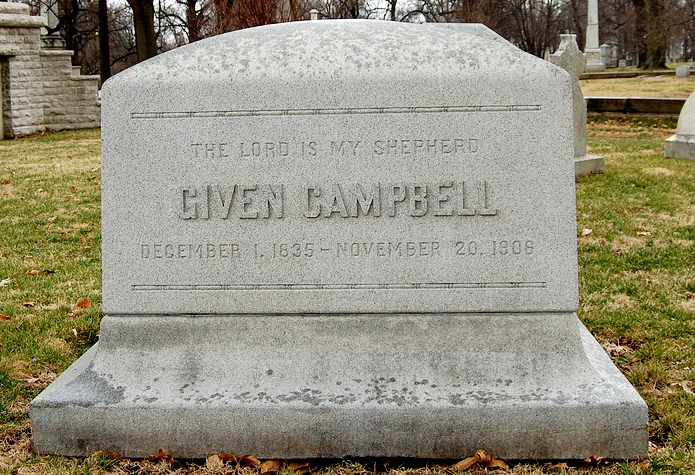
Given Campbell's headstone

Retiring to Paducah, Kentucky, Given Campbell built a home and lived there a few months. While visiting Saint Louis, Campbell died after a short illness on November 20, 1906, and was survived by his wife and three children, viz: Dr. Given Campbell, Jr; Susan C. Evans (née Campbell), wife of Albert D. Evans; and lawyer James C. Campbell. Given Campbell is buried at Bellefontaine Cemetery in St. Louis, Missouri in Plot Block 112, Lot 56.
