= Campbell House Museum =

Historic house in Missouri, United States

- U.S. National Register of Historic Places
- St. Louis Landmark
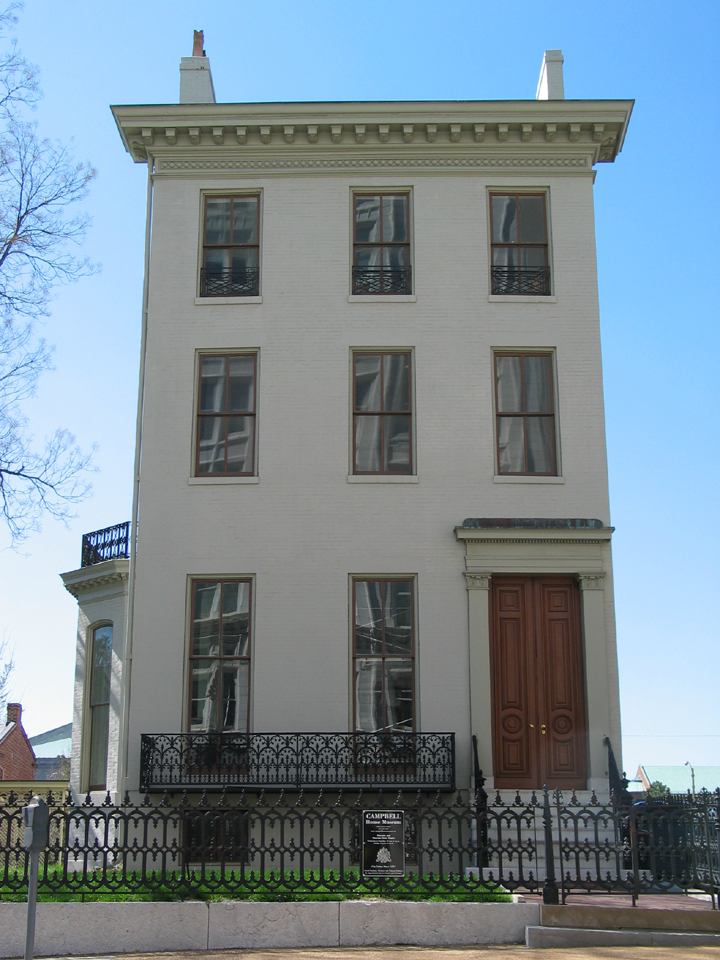

- Location within St. Louis Location within Missouri Location within the United States
- Location: 1508 Locust St., St. Louis, Missouri
- Coordinates: 38°37′52″N 90°12′5″W
- Built: 1851
- Architectural style: Early Victorian, Greek Revival
- NRHP reference No.: 77001560
- Added to NRHP: April 21, 1977

The Campbell House Museum is the former residence of Robert Campbell and his wife Virginia Kyle Campbell in Downtown St. Louis, Missouri, US. The house was first built in 1851 by John Hall and was the Campbell family's residence from 1853 to 1938. It became a historic house museum on February 6, 1943. The museum was documented as part of the Historic American Buildings Survey between 1936 and 1941, designated a St. Louis Landmark in 1946, and listed on the National Register of Historic Places in 1977. The museum is owned and operated by the Campbell House Foundation, Inc. a 501(c)(3) non-profit organization.

== Building and renovations ==
The Campbell House Museum commemorates the home and Victorian lifestyle of Robert Campbell and his wife Virginia Kyle Campbell. The house was first built in 1851 by John Hall. Hall sold it to Cornelia Hempsted Wilson in 1853 and she lived in the house for only one year. Robert Campbell purchased the house in 1853, and he and his family lived there until the death of his last surviving child in 1938. The building was located at 20 Lucas Place. Lucas Place was a new residential street created around 1850 by siblings James Lucas and Ann Lucas Hunt.

Robert Campbell purchased the house for around $18,000 and soon after moving in, enlarged the back of the house adding a larger kitchen, dining room, and more servant bedrooms. In 1867 the Campbell family continued renovations including: combining the two front parlors into one larger space; adding a three-story bay window on the east side and adding three extra rooms on the third floor. In 1885 an exterior porch was enclosed and the morning room created. In 1900 Lucas Place became known as Locust Street and the house was renumbered to 1508 Locust Street, its current address.

== The museum takes shape ==
The last surviving child of Robert Campbell was Hazlett Campbell who died at home in 1938. The death of the Campbell brothers and the complexity of the family trusts and wills prompted a lengthy string of litigation between the trustees for the estate, banks, and descendants and people claiming to be descendants. As the Campbells' estates were settled the fate of the house and its contents became unclear. In preparing an inventory and evaluation of the estate, leading experts in history, architecture and art were called. All were amazed after visiting the house, pronouncing, "probably nowhere in America, possible nowhere else, is such an intact and integral display of elaborate and ornate furnishings of the middle Victorian period to be found, as in the Campbell mansion." It was clear that the house needed to be saved and the unique and important story of the Campbells preserved.

A local history group called the William Clark Society began to organize an effort to save the building and its contents as a museum. The committee formed for the task included architectural historian John Bryan, eminent Missouri historian Charles van Ravenswaay and director of the St. Louis Art Museum Perry Rathborne.

The Campbells' cousins, who had inherited the contents of the house, chose to auction everything. St. Louis auction house Selkirk's conducted the sale on February 24, 25 and 26, 1941. The William Clark Society was able to raise more than $6,500 in just a few weeks, purchasing the majority of the furnishings. Buyers donated many other Campbell pieces after the auctions. The Campbell House Foundation was formally incorporated later that year.

Celebrating its 50th anniversary in 1942, local St. Louis department store, Stix, Baer and Fuller purchased the house from Yale University and presented it to the people of St. Louis through the Campbell House Foundation. The house had been left to Yale University by the will of the oldest Campbell son, Hugh in honor of the youngest James, who had died at the young age of 30 and who had attended Yale University.

== Redecoration and the first 30 years (1943–73) ==
When the foundation got possession of the house in 1942 they immediately began raising funds to refurbish the interior with new wallpaper, paint and carpets. This redecoration reflected a mid-20th-century concept of the Campbell's Victorian interior and was not an accurate restoration of what had existed in the 19th century.

The House Museum formally opened to the public on February 6, 1943. During the 1940s the Campbell House was one of the only museums dedicated to the history and decorative arts of mid-Victorian America. The museum was featured in Life magazine in May 1945 and National Geographic in March 1946.

The museum's interiors were redecorated again in 1967. In January 1973 the Campbell House was featured in the pages of Architectural Digest. Later that same year an important album of 60 photographs was donated to the museum. The 8-inch by 10-inch photos show not only the house interior, room by room, but also the exterior and surrounding neighborhood. The photos date from about 1885 and may have been taken by Hugh Campbell, but for what purpose is unclear. The album was discovered in the trash of a law firm that worked on the Campbell estate. This collection of photographs documents the accurate historic restoration of the museum.

== Early restorations (1973–95) ==
The discovery of the Campbell House photo album allowed for accurate restoration of the interior rooms. Using the photographs, the first room to be restored was the morning room beginning in 1980. During the mid-1980s the dining room was partially restored. False wood graining was restored or recreated in both rooms. In the morning room, wallpaper was recreated to match the pattern in the photos. In the dining room, the elaborate painted ceiling was recreated.

== The restoration (2000–05) ==
In February 2000, the restoration of the house started with the packing and storing of the entire museum collection. The exterior restoration was complete by mid-2001. In addition to mechanical updates, the exterior restoration included returning the exterior of the house to its historic appearance and colors as well as completing structural work to insure the long-term preservation of the building and collection.

The interior restoration began in the Spring 2001 and was completed in 2005 restoring the house as closely as possible to its appearance in the 1885 photographs.

== The expansion (2019) ==
In 2019, the museum broke ground on a $1.8 million expansion. The project includes construction of a new street-level accessible entrance, two education spaces, a new gift shop, and lobby along with an elevator that will allow visitors to tour the house without using stairs.
