= Old Southern Hotel fire =

1877 multiple-fatality building fire

Coordinates: 38.6242°N 90.1899°W

The old Southern Hotel in St. Louis, Missouri in the United States burned down on April 11, 1877, killing 21 people. The building, located between Fourth, Fifth, Walnut and Elm, was utterly destroyed by the catastrophe, leaving "jagged, smoking ruins."

Two Irish-immigrant firefighters, Phelim O'Toole (of Hook and Ladder No. 3) and Michael J. Hester, were credited with saving 20 lives. Also, according to the St. Louis Dispatch the next morning, "A girl on Fifth Street, between Elm and Myrtle, had her dress set on fire by the falling cinders and would undoubtedly have perished had not a big German snatched off her outer dress and trampled it underfoot." Among the survivors were the actress Katie Claxton, and, separately, Joseph Pulitzer. Pulitzer had been staying on the third floor and he escaped "sans shirt, stockings, or anything else." Amongst the dead was a vicar from Stockross, Berkshire, England, an American reverend, a Masonic secretary, two female servants, and an executive of the Missouri Pacific Railway.

The fire started about 1 a.m., and the building may have been on fire for half an hour before the alarm was sounded. it was surmised that the "immense draft of the baggage elevator" pulled the flames upwards through the building. The thick smoke apparently extinguished the hotel's gas lighting so no one could see.

The Southern Hotel had originally been constructed in 1865, and had reportedly cost US$1,000,000 (equivalent to $21,032,609 in 2025). It was a grand hotel, with some 400 guest rooms, thick brick walls inside and out, water pipes and fire hose on each floor, and an "annunciator" fire alarm. A new Southern Hotel was built on the same location beginning in 1880.

== Popular Culture ==
- "Phelim O'Toole" Words and music by Harry Banks.

== See also ==
- Brooklyn Theatre fire (Katie Claxton also survived this 1876 fire)
- List of hotel fires in the United States
