= John G. Priest =

American businessman and civic leader (1822–1900)

John G. Priest (1822–1900) was a businessman and social and civic leader in St. Louis, Missouri, in the latter part of the 19th century. He was the first Veiled Prophet representation of that city.

John G. Priest

== Personal ==
Priest was born in Charlestown, Boston, Massachusetts, on July 16, 1822, and moved to St. Louis at the age of 19.

He was married in St. Louis to Virginia Elodie Chouteau, the daughter of Auguste F. Chouteau; they had fifteen children. Priest built a three-story mansion at 1003 Chouteau Avenue, in "the most aristocratic" district in the city. "The very best materials that could be procured" were used in the construction and the furnishings were said to be "the finest in St. Louis."

Persian marble mantels, mahogany from the tropics and oak from England . . . . furniture [was] imported from various parts of the world. . . . Priest was making money fast in his business, and besides that his wife was immensely wealthy, so there was no reason why he should not indulge his taste.

In 1895 Priest became seriously ill and was expected to die. He was administered conditional baptism within the Roman Catholic Church, which was the faith of his wife and children.

Priest's first wife died in 1897, and four months later at age 75, he "quietly departed for New York," where on August 16 he married Ella Bule, 31, a school teacher, "and for whom Mr. Priest had been a confidential adviser." A child, Maud Goodridge, was born in St. Louis on August 23, 1898, and the new family came to live in the same house with Priest's children, who were then adults.

Ella filed for divorce soon after, alleging that Priest allowed her to be subjected to "indignities" by his children. Priest, at age 77, had the distinction of being "about the oldest man ever sued for divorce in St. Louis." While the suit was pending, he became ill and she returned to the house "and nursed him until his death."

After a two-month illness, Priest died on July 4, 1900, at the age of 78 in the residence, being survived by his second wife and Maud, as well as sons Warren G., Marcus or Mark and John and daughters Auguste L., Annie M., and Virginia C. He was buried in Bellefontaine Cemetery.

At his death, he and Ella had been living in the house along with Priest's children from his first marriage and, according to the Republic, the widow and the older children did not speak to each other.

Priest's will, dated October 24, 1864, was filed for probate on August 11, 1900. In it he willed all his property to his first wife, Virginia E. A legal struggle for inheritance soon began, a judge setting aside the will on the grounds that Priest had remarried. Further legal movements left Ella Priest in charge of all the property, which she proceeded to sell.

The St. Louis Republic said that Priest died "in the midst of poverty, owing thousands of dollars more than his estate was worth" and that his furniture, "gathered from the remotest parts of the world and costing thousands of dollars, has been sold for a song."

Ella Priest became a teacher at Franklin School in Belleville, Illinois.

== Business and civic affairs ==
Priest took up the real estate business soon after moving to St. Louis, and he eventually became the fourth president of the St. Louis Real Estate Exchange. The 1850 census had him as a "gauger and inspector of wines and liquors."

His clients were counted by the thousands, and rarely a great real estate transaction took place in St. Louis that he did not have a hand in. Wealth came to him in steady streams, and while a good moneymaker, he was a lavish spender.

In antebellum politics, Priest was a Conditional Unionist, one who opposed not only secession but also coercion of the seceded states.

In 1868 Priest was one of the presiding officers of a banquet that celebrated the impeachment of President Andrew Johnson. For eight years he was on the Democratic National Committee and managed the 1876 campaign of Samuel J. Tilden in the Western United States, which at that time began at the Mississippi River.

He was president of an 1874 St. Louis County Grand Jury. In 1875 he was named one of the five members of the city's Police Commission. As board president in 1877, Priest authorized the first press room in St. Louis's Four Courts Building. He was also a member of the Board of Health.

At different times he was director of the St. Louis Bank, president of the Mullanphy Emigrant Board (an organization that cared for homeless travelers), a director of the St. Louis Mutual Life Insurance Company and a member of the Board of Managers of the city's House of Refuge.

In December 1877, Priest suggested that a charity ball be held at Masonic Hall, "the proceeds to be used in buying fuel for needy families during the winter." The next year in December the ball netted $7,391 for charity.

In 1878, Priest was the first of St. Louis's annual Veiled Prophets. He was also a member of the Democratic National Committee.

Missouri Governor John S. Phelps ousted Priest from the Police Commission in February 1879.

== Additional reading ==
- "The People's Forum: The Priest Case," St. Louis Post-Dispatch, July 27, 1885, image 4. Explanation of Priest's legal connection with the St. Louis Mutual Life Insurance Company.
- "Col. J.G. Priest Has His Joke: He Was Married Last Christmas in New York," St. Louis Post-Dispatch, July 14, 1898, image 8. A reporter is turned away in his attempt to track down information on the newlyweds.
