= Sigma Nu =

North American collegiate fraternity

- ΣΝ
- Founded: January 1, 1869; 157 years ago Virginia Military Institute
- Type: Social
- Affiliation: NIC
- Status: Active
- Scope: North America
- Motto: "Love, Honor, Truth"
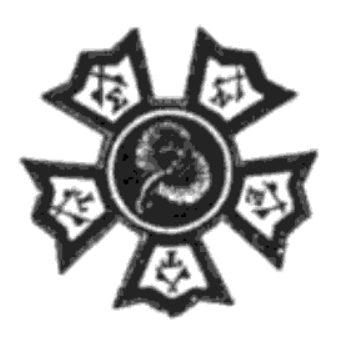
- Member badge
- Colors: Black White Gold
- Flag
- Flower: White Rose
- Publication: The Delta
- Philanthropy: Helping Hand Initiative
- Chapters: 279
- Members: 235,000+ lifetime
- Nicknames: Sig Nu, Snu
- Headquarters: 9 North Lewis Street; P.O. Box 1869; Lexington, Virginia 24450; United States
- Website: sigmanu.org

Sigma Nu (ΣΝ) is an undergraduate college fraternity founded at the Virginia Military Institute in 1869. Since its founding, Sigma Nu has chartered more than 279 chapters across the United States and Canada and has initiated more than 235,000 members. It is part of the Lexington Triad, a trio of national fraternities that were founded at colleges in Lexington, Virginia. The fraternity is a member of the North American Interfraternity Conference.

== History ==
Sigma Nu was founded by James Frank Hopkins, Greenfield Quarles, and James McIlvaine Riley shortly after Hopkins witnessed what he considered a hazing ritual by upperclassmen at the Virginia Military Institute.

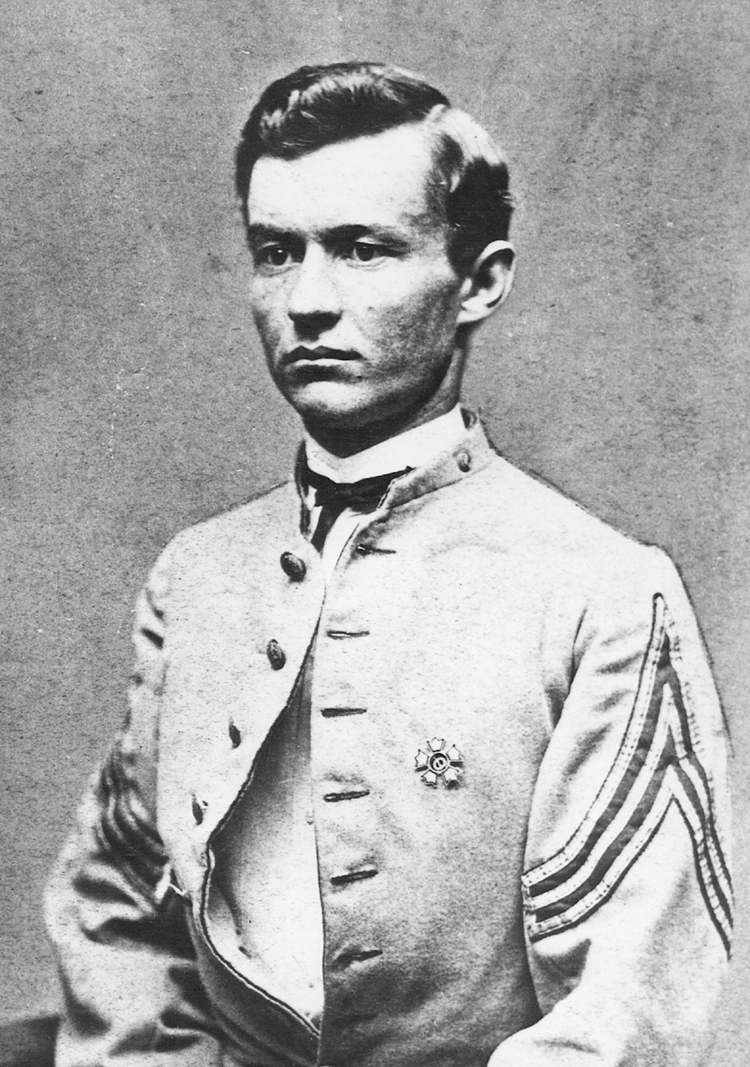
Greenfield Quarles

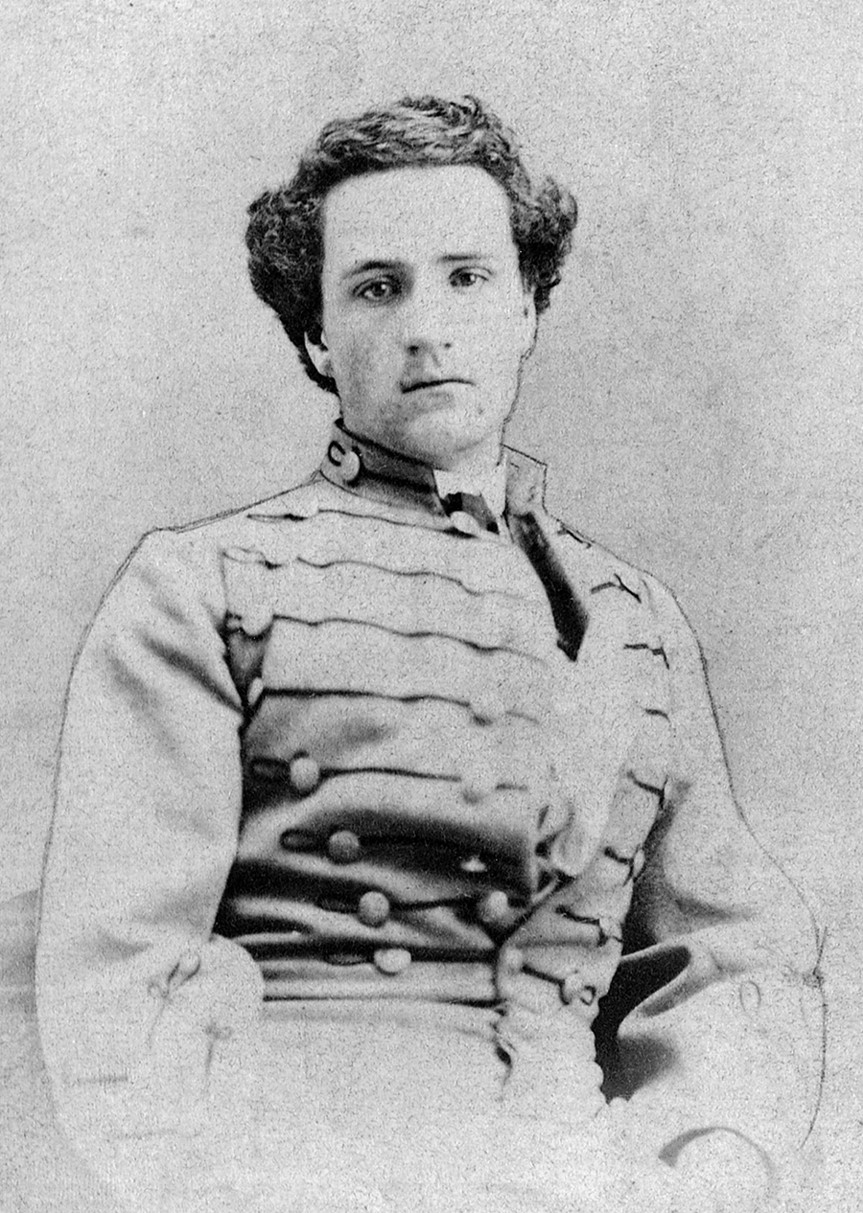
James McIlvaine Riley

The founders of Sigma Nu

James Frank Hopkins, Greenfield Quarles, and James McIlvaine Riley enrolled at the Virginia Military Institute in 1866. Hopkins entered the institute at the age of 21 and was, at the time, one of the oldest cadets entering the institute. Both Hopkins and Quarles had served in the American Civil War as Confederate soldiers.

At this time, many secret societies were being formed on the VMI campus. In Hopkins' third year at VMI, he joined the Masonic Lodge in Lexington. The masons inspired him to create a similar organization at VMI. Hopkins shared his ideas with Quarles and Riley, and in October 1868, the three came together on a limestone rock on the edge of the VMI parade ground to form the Legion of Honor. The three founders would go on to bring others into the Legion of Honor over the rest of the year. On January 1, 1869, the founders, along with the rest of the members of the Legion of Honor, held their first official meeting as Sigma Nu. The fraternity's existence remained secret until the founders publicly announced their new society on January 1, 1869.

Hopkins designed the fraternity's badge, which stands mostly unchanged from its original form. The badge was introduced in the spring of 1869. Early members, Edward Arthur and Linton Buck, both wrote the original Constitution and Law, respectively. Some conflict arose because Arthur had been a member of the Honduras Emigrant Society and had included some influences from that organization in the constitution. Buck felt these influences should be removed. His revision became the first Law of Sigma Nu.

There were many efforts in the beginning years to establish chapters at other schools. By 1883, Alpha chapter chartered eleven additional chapters, of which only three survived. One of the many factors was the anti-fraternity sentiment during this time. Kappa chapter was established in 1881 at North Georgia College & State University, giving the fraternity an important member, John Alexander Howard. Howard suggested that the fraternity drop the use of Roman numerals for chapter designation in favor of using a Greek letter designation. He is also responsible for the creation of The Delta, Sigma Nu's fraternity magazine, which was first published in April 1883. The name The Delta originated from the location of the three active chapters of Sigma Nu forming a Delta.

Howard's editorials in The Delta inspired Isaac P. Robison, founder of Lambda chapter, to propose a convention for the national fraternity. On July 10, 1884, Sigma Nu's first convention was held in the Maxwell House Hotel in Nashville, Tennessee. The first national headquarters for the fraternity was established in Indianapolis in 1915. It relocated to Lexington, Virginia in 1958. Additional wings were added to the headquarters building in 1969 and 1994 for Sigma Nu's 100th and 125th anniversaries.

In 1909, Sigma Nu was a founding member of the North American Interfraternity Conference.

== Symbols and traditions ==
This first chapter of Sigma Nu chose as its motto nulli secundus, a Latin phrase meaning "second to none." The fraternity's values are summarized by the principles or pillars of love, honor, and truth. Because of its military heritage, Sigma Nu retains many military trappings in its chapter ranks and traditions, and places importance on the concept of personal honor. The fraternity's mission statement is:

- To develop ethical leaders inspired by the principles of Love, Honor, and Truth.
- To foster the personal growth of each man's mind, heart, and character.
- To perpetuate lifelong friendships and commitment to the Fraternity.

Sigma Nu's colors are black, white, and gold. Its flower is the white rose, specifically the wild English 'Floribunda. Its song is "The White Star of Sigma Nu". Its publication is The Delta.

Its gold badge was designed by Hopkins, one of the fraternity's founders. It has a round center with a golden coiled serpent on a black enamel background. From the center are five arms that feature a pair of crossed swords and a single letter on a background of white enamel; the letters collectively spell the Greek letters ΣΝΕΤΤ. Its pledge pin looks like the center of the member's badge.

== Activities ==
The fraternity sponsors various programming including ethical leadership development through its LEAD program and philanthropic events through its Helping Hand Initiative. It recruits new members using its Values Based Recruitment method.

=== College of Chapters ===
The Sigma Nu College of Chapters is a three-day training program held annually. College of Chapters is designed for collegiate chapter Commanders, and the program emphasizes chapter management, leadership, core competencies, and networking. The curriculum focuses on best practices and is presented by fraternity staff, alumni volunteers, and advisers.

=== LEAD ===
The LEAD (Leadership, Ethics, Achievement, Development) Program is designed to be a four-year educational and development curriculum for its collegiate members. In 1988, Sigma Nu created the LEAD Program. Since its launch in 1988 the Program has been updated twice, once in 1997 and again in 2008. The 2008 updates included the online version of the LEAD Program that currently exists today. The program trains candidates in general life skills, with an emphasis on alcohol use disorder awareness.

=== Awards ===
Sigma Nu has several awards that are presented to chapters. The Rock Chapter Award is the highest award a Sigma Nu chapter can receive. The LEAD Chapter of the Year award is for the LEAD program. The Gallaher Cup is awarded to the chapter with the highest GPA.

== Philanthropy ==
In 1945, William Yates (University of Pennsylvania) inspired the formation of the "Sigma Nu Inc., Educational Foundation". Its name was changed to the "Sigma Nu Educational Foundation, Inc." The foundation assists collegiate members with financial aid supplements and the fraternity in the development of a leadership program.

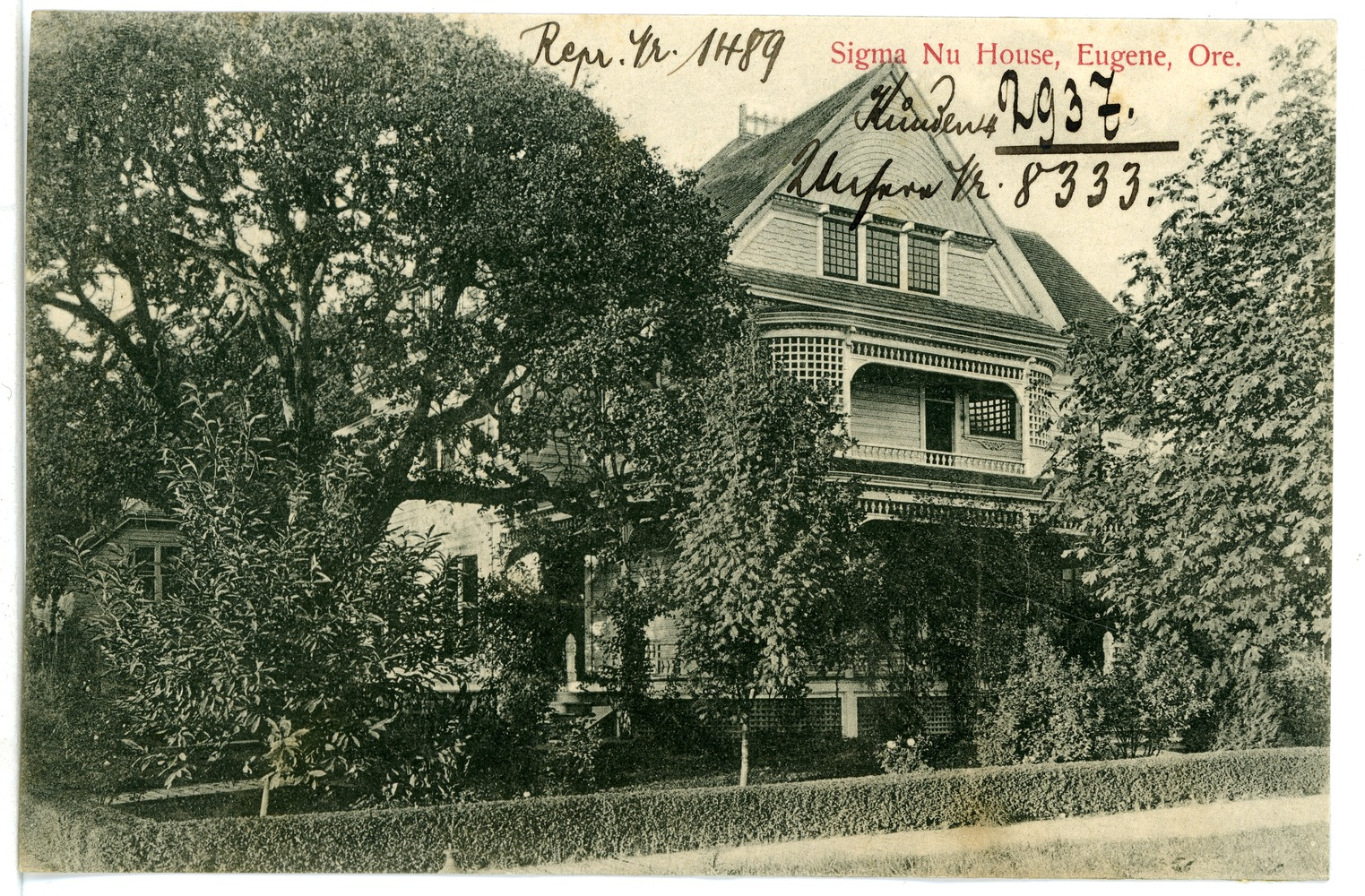
Sigma Nu chapter house in Eugene, Oregon, 1906

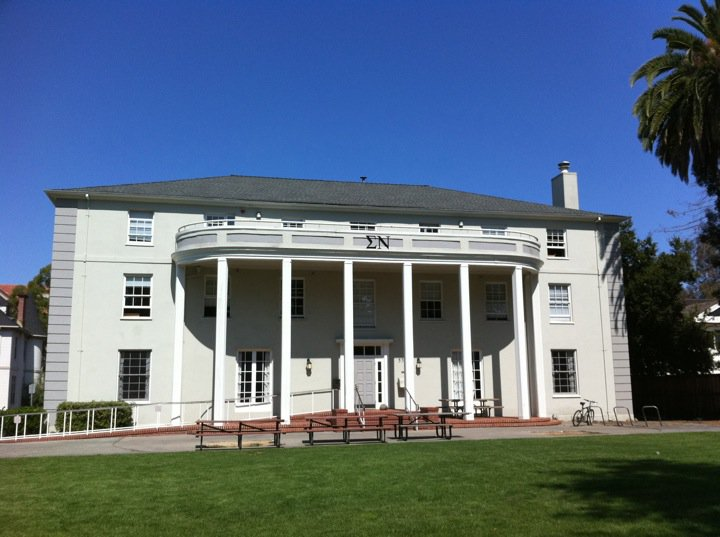
Stanford University chapter house

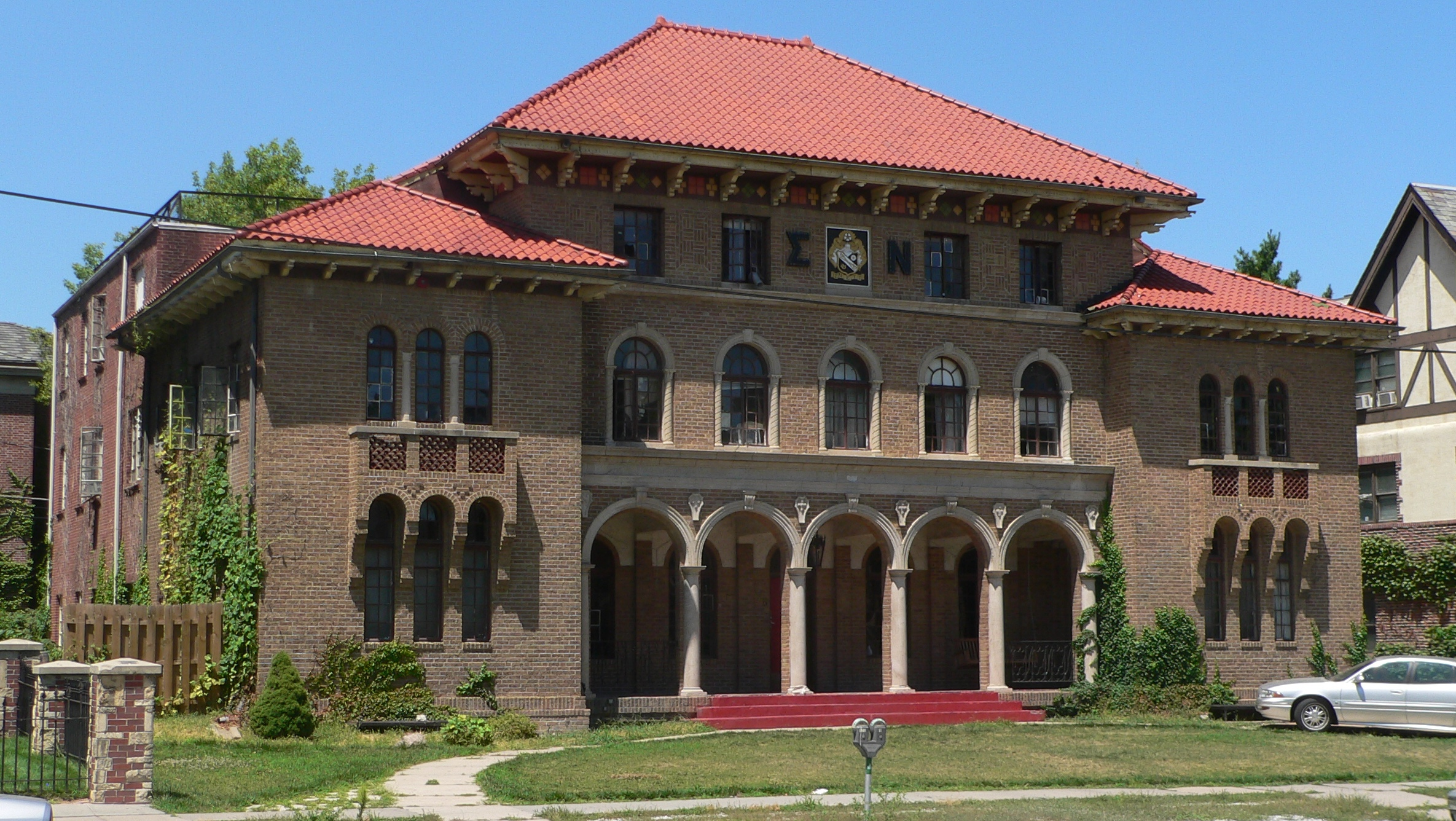
University of Nebraska–Lincoln chapter house

University of Colorado chapter house, 2002

== Chapters ==
Sigma Nu has some 160 active chapters in colleges and universities throughout the United States and Canada.

== Governance structure ==
=== Grand Chapter ===
The Grand Chapter of Sigma Nu is a four-day legislative convention where representatives of the fraternity's collegiate and alumni chapters and grand officers meet to determine new legislation and operational direction of the Fraternity for the next biennium. The Grand Chapter meets every two years. The Grand Chapter body is composed of two voting representatives from each collegiate chapter of Sigma Nu Fraternity. Laws are discussed and voted on by the collegiate representatives in Robert's Rules of Order style business meeting conducted by the national regent of the fraternity.

=== The Law ===
The Law is a three-part document, including the fraternity's constitution, statutes, and trial code. It sets membership requirements, standards of conduct, and the framework for the operation of all entities of the fraternity, including collegiate chapters. The Law is designed to allow for autonomy and self-governance in collegiate chapters. It may be amended by the Grand Chapter to accommodate the changing needs of Sigma Nu's membership. The first edition of the Law was formally adopted at Sigma Nu's first convention in 1884.

=== High Council ===
The High Council serves as the board of directors of Sigma Nu Fraternity, Inc., and is elected by the Grand Chapter. It serves as the governing arm of the general fraternity during the period between Grand Chapters. Governance of the High Council is relegated to those duties especially prescribed by The Law. In cases where The Law prescribes no special duty, the High Council shall act on those situations through interpretation of The Law. There are five roles on the High Council: the regent, who acts as the national president and chairman of the board of Sigma Nu for a term of two years; the regent-elect, the grand treasurer; the vice-regents, appointed members of the board; and the collegiate grand councilmen, who serve as collegiate representatives to the High Council.

== Notable members ==
Since the founding of Sigma Nu, it has initiated over 235,000 members.

== Controversies and member misconduct ==
- The fraternity began debating allowing non-white and Jewish members shortly after the Supreme Court of the United States desegregated schools in 1954. In 1964, following a failed civil rights amendment to the Sigma Nu's constitution, the Dartmouth College chapter seceded from the fraternity in protest. The organization did not allow non-white members until the late 1960s. The Dartmouth chapter rejoined in 1983.
- Members of the Upsilon chapter at the University of Texas, Austin, including actor Jon Hamm, were arrested for participating in a violent hazing in November 1990 during which pledge Mark Sanders was beaten with a paddle and a broom, led by Hamm around the fraternity house with the claw of a hammer beneath his genitals, and had his clothes set on fire. The chapter closed and Hamm completed the terms of a deferred adjudication; his charges were dismissed in 1995.
- In 2004, nine members of Fresno State University were arrested for kidnapping after playing a prank on their vice president. Other students witnessed the prank and called the police because they thought it was a real abduction.
- In 2008, Michael Starks an 18-year-old fraternity pledge at Utah State University died from acute alcohol poisoning. Starks and another pledge were taken to a Chi Omega sorority house under the pretext of helping move furniture, they were then painted and given alcohol. Later that night he was found unresponsive at the Sigma Nu fraternity house and later pronounced dead at a hospital. Utah State University suspended and later ended its relationship with the local Sigma Nu chapter and the Chi Omega chapter at USU.
- In 2010, a fraternity member at Arizona State University stabbed a fellow member when he tried to throw him into a pool.
- Sigma Nu suspended all chapter events at University of North Carolina Wilmington after a fight broke out at a party it hosted in February 2014, resulting in an East Carolina University student driving with a U.S. Marine on his hood. The driver hit a tree, killing the Marine; he was arrested for DWI and felony death by vehicle.
- Also in 2015, Sigma Nu suspended its chapter at Old Dominion University pending an investigation after they placed banners with slogans like "Rowdy and Fun, Hope Your Baby Girl is Ready for a Good Time..." and the story went viral.
- In August 2016, a Sigma Nu member at Texas A&M University died of an illegal drug overdose in the fraternity house. Six members were arrested for possession and distribution of illegal drugs on campus such as cocaine, meth, LSD, MDMA, marijuana, heroin, and ecstasy. In October 2017, the deceased member's father, Eugene Gridnev, instituted a wrongful death suit against the fraternity itself, as well as several of the members present during his son's death. The lawsuit was settled out-of-court.
- Also in October 2016, Sigma Nu suspended its chapter at University of Nevada, Reno, when a freshman pledge fell down the stairs and died after a night of excessive drinking in the fraternity house.
- In May 2018, the fraternity at Cornell University was suspended for three years due to hazing allegations reported to the university. According to university reports, their pledges were blindfolded, dropped off in a wooded area, pressured to excessively drink alcohol, hosed down while in their underwear, and were subject to inappropriate gesturing, physical exercise, and homophobic slurs.
- In October 2021, the fraternity at University of Southern California was suspended following allegations of sexual assault against at least seven women.
- In 2021, the fraternity at University of California, Santa Barbara (UCSB) was suspended after a second-year fraternity member died on an unsanctioned fraternity trip. In September 2022, the fraternity chapter at UCSB closed down following financial delinquency, alcohol violations, and dishonesty with the university and national organization.
- In September 2026, the fraternity at Louisiana Tech University was involved in a situation where they yelled racial slurs using the speakers after a sanctioned event at their house on campus.
- In November 2026, the fraternity at North Carolina State University was suspended after allegations of hazing. University police found videos on members' phones of fraternity members doing drugs and vomiting on each other.
