= Butler House (St. Louis, Missouri) =

Historic house in Missouri, United States

- U.S. National Register of Historic Places
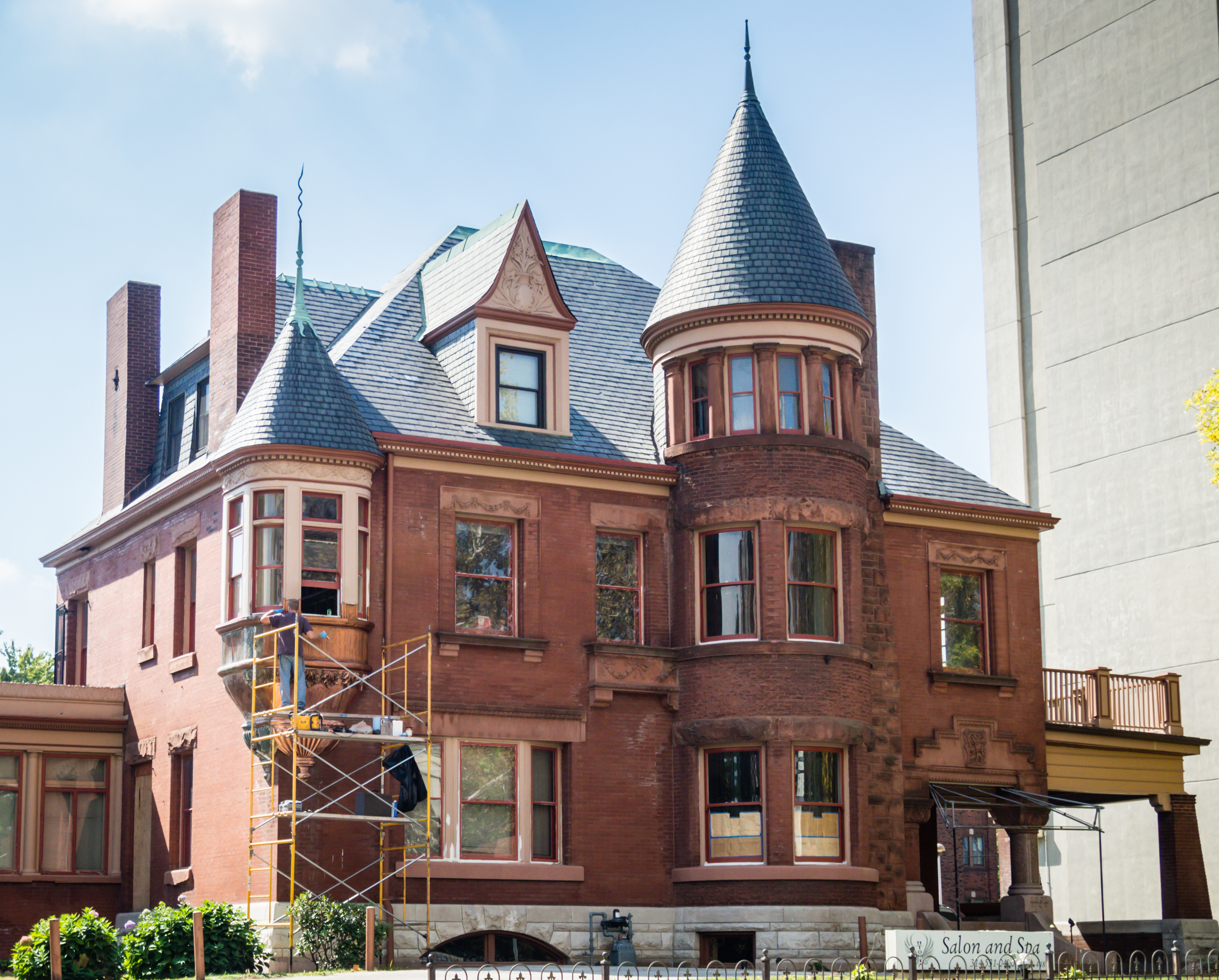
- Butler House in St. Louis's; Central West End
- Location: 4484 W. Pine Boulevard; St. Louis, Missouri, U.S.
- Coordinates: 38.640616°N 90.257735°W
- Built: 1892
- Architect: Albert Knell
- NRHP reference No.: 82004733

The Butler House is a turreted, brick house built in 1892 for prominent St. Louis tobacco manufacturer James Gay Butler. It was designed in the Queen Anne style by Albert Knell, a Canadian architect.
