= Virginia Kyle Campbell =

American socialite

Virginia Campbell
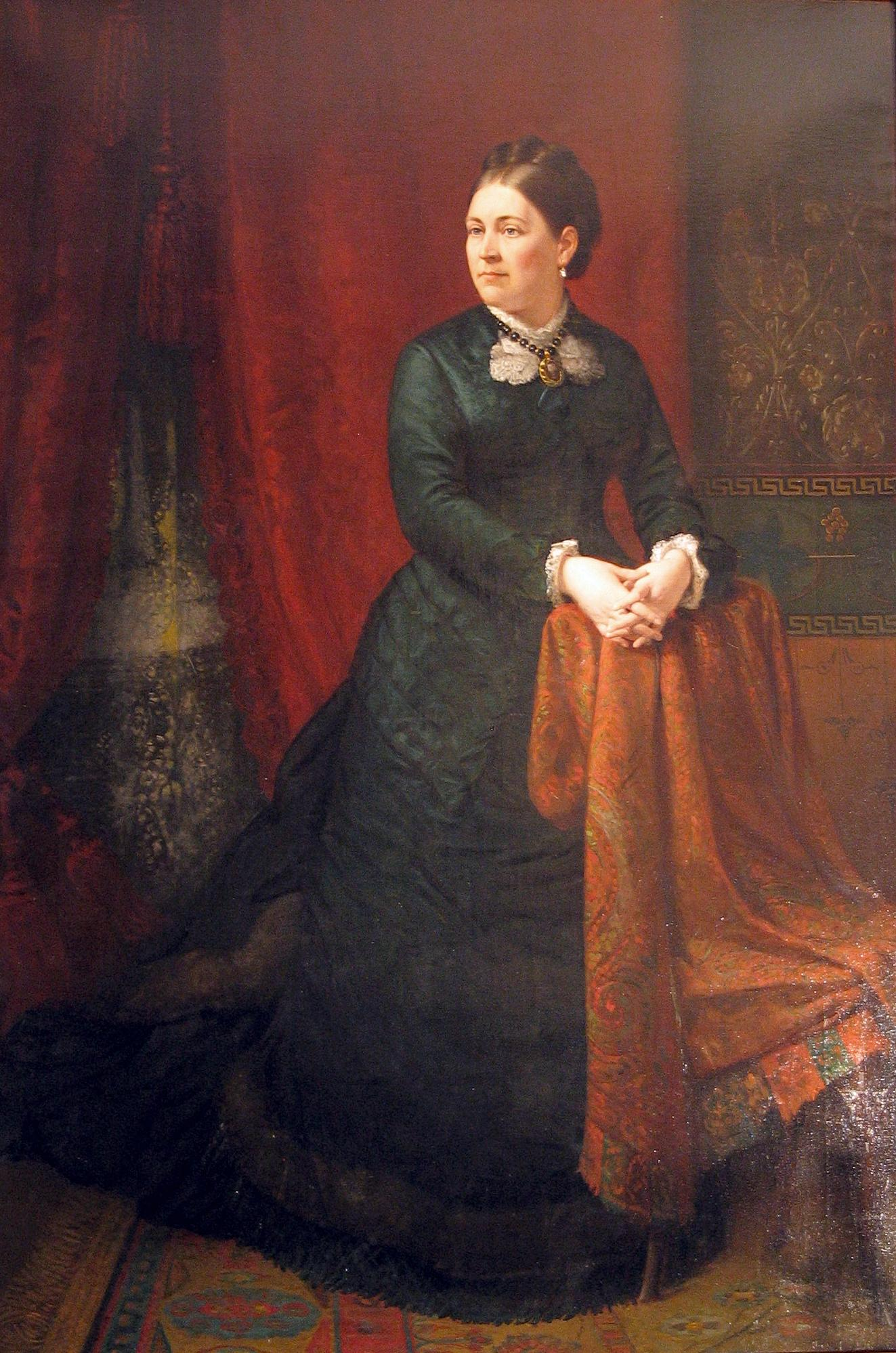
- Portrait painted posthumously circa 1885
- Born: January 25, 1822; Raleigh, North Carolina, U.S
- Died: January 30, 1882 (aged 60); St. Louis, Missouri, U.S.
- Known for: Wife of frontiersman Robert Campbell and important example of St. Louis high-society women in the mid-19th century
- Website: Campbell House Museum Website

Virginia Kyle Campbell (January 25, 1822 – January 30, 1882) was an American socialite who played host to members of St. Louis high society into her home. These notable St. Louis citizens included President Ulysses S. Grant, James Eads, General William T. Sherman, and botanist Henry Shaw. She was highly educated at a women's finishing school, taught her sons through preparatory school, traveled with her children unaccompanied by a man, and ran the household in absence of her husband.

Virginia was married to Robert Campbell, an Irish immigrant known as a frontiersman, fur trapper, banker, and businessman. Robert even wrote to Virginia before their marriage stating that she "will soon be [his] counselor and adviser and it may be-manager." Their St. Louis home is now preserved as the Campbell House Museum which has been open to the public since 1943.

== Youth and courtship ==
Virginia was born on January 25, 1822, to Hazlett Kyle and Lucy Ann Winston Kyle. Virginia's family was from County Tyrone, Ireland, and her family had a farm near the farm of her future husband's family, Robert Campbell.

Virginia's mother was widowed when Virginia was 11, and Virginia's uncle became her legal guardian. Virginia and Eleanor, her older sister, attended the Freeman's Finishing School for young women in Philadelphia. There they often visited their cousin, Mary Kyle Campbell who was married to Hugh Campbell, Robert Campbell's older brother.

Robert Campbell went to Philadelphia on business for his dry-goods store in the fall of 1835. During his visit he suffered a relapse of fever that had plagued him for most of his life and was confined to his brother Hugh's home under the care of a doctor. It was during his illness that he met Virginia Jane Kyle for the first time while she was visiting her cousin Mary. At the time Robert was 31 and Virginia was only 13 years old.

Robert and Virginia's friendship flourished after he returned to St. Louis and they began courting, which would prove to be long and drawn out. The two friends wrote to each often and some of these letters are preserved in the archives of the Campbell House Museum. Robert's friends and relatives were not very happy with Robert's interest in the young Virginia. Virginia was deemed "too gay and frivolous" and she already had been "four times courted and twice engaged." But Robert persisted in his attentions towards her and asked Virginia's mother for permission to marry her daughter when she was 16. Lucy gave Robert her consent only under the condition that they would wait to be wed until Virginia reached the age of 18.

Virginia's mother was opposed to the wedding occurring at Virginia's uncle's home, despite him being her legal guardian. She preferred that they come to Raleigh, North Carolina, to hold the wedding in her home. In one of Robert's letters to Virginia written in anticipation of their marriage, he said: "Recollect you will soon be my counselor and adviser and it may be - manager - that of course I will not acknowledge and I feel confident you will make, 'my yoke easy' and my life happy."

== Marriage and family life ==
On February 25, 1841, Robert and Virginia were married at her mother's home in Raleigh. They spent their honeymoon at Robert's brother Hugh's home in Philadelphia before moving permanently to St. Louis. The Campbells took a suite of rooms in the fashionable new Planters House Hotel, just south of the Old Courthouse.

Between 1842 and 1854 the Campbells lived in two different attached-row houses on South 5th Street (now South Broadway where Busch Stadium stands today). In November 1854 Robert and Virginia purchased and moved into the house at 20 Lucas Place, what is today the Campbell House Museum.

Virginia had her first child in May 1842. Robert and Virginia had 12 more live births over the next 22 years and perhaps as many as six miscarriages and stillbirths during the same period.

== Extended family ==
Virginia was very close to her mother Lucy and sister Eleanor. Not long after the Campbells moved to their new large home on Lucas Place Virginia's mother moved in. Lucy did not care for Virginia's sister's husband William Otey and from her letters written to Virginia and Robert at that time, she was obviously distressed about their marriage and Otey's character. Otey was a slave-trader and an alcoholic. Lucy wanted to free her three slaves but she feared for their safety because of Otey. This may account for Lucy's decision to move all the way to St. Louis to be with her daughter Virginia and her family. Lucy lived with the Campbells until she died in 1883, outliving both Robert and Virginia. Virginia's sister, Eleanor Kyle Otey, also lived with the Campbells from time to time between the 1850s and 1890s.

It has been recently discovered that Virginia did own three slaves. It appears that when she married Robert she received the slaves from her father's estate, maybe as a dowry. However, shortly after their marriage, she freed the slaves at around the same time her mother freed her slaves with Robert's assistance.

== Social involvement ==
Virginia Campbell hosted many notable St. Louis citizens. At a dinner she gave 1874 Virginia Campbell held a formal reception for President Grant, his wife and their close friends. Virginia was also a leader in historic preservation. She served as the vice Regent of the Mount Vernon Ladies Associates between 1879 and 1882. This organization governs the estate of Mount Vernon to this day, and was composed of wealthy ladies. Virginia served as their representative from Missouri.

== Death ==
Virginia died three years after her husband on January 30, 1882. She is buried at Bellefontaine Cemetery with her husband Robert and 12 of their 13 children.
