= James Frank Hopkins =

American fraternity founder (1845–1913)

- Born: December 30, 1845; Ripley, Mississippi
- Died: December 15, 1913 (aged 67)
- Resting place: Martin Cemetery; Mabelvale, Arkansas
- Occupations: Merchant, Real estate
- Known for: Sigma Nu founding brother
- Spouse: Jennie Barclay
- Military career
- Allegiance: Confederate States of America
- Branch: Confederate States Army
- Service years: 1864–1865
- Rank: Color Sergeant
- Unit: Anderson's Arkansas Cavalry Battalion
- Conflicts: American Civil War

James Frank Hopkins (December 30, 1845 – December 15, 1913) was a Confederate Army volunteer and founder of the Sigma Nu fraternity at the Virginia Military Institute.

== Civil War ==
Hopkins was born in Ripley, Mississippi on December 30, 1845. At the outbreak of the Civil War the Hopkins family moved to Arkansas Post near Little Rock. At 15 years old James Frank Hopkins was denied enlistment in the Confederate Army because he was too young.

In 1864 he was accepted as a private in a cavalry troop of Anderson's Arkansas Cavalry Battalion, part of General James F. Fagan's division, and later attained the rank of Color Sergeant. His expert horsemanship was put to use as a courier in several battles in the last year of the war.

== Civilian life ==
Hopkins entered Virginia Military Institute (VMI) in 1866 at 21 years old. 1866 also marked the year that Hopkins rebelled against the hazing of freshman at VMI. Hopkins was the principal founder of Sigma Nu fraternity. He served as the Lieutenant Commander of the original Alpha Chapter, and the designer of the badge.

His involvement with the organization continued through his life, as he served as the first Vice-Regent and attended Grand Chapters in 1902, 1908, and 1910.

== Death ==
On December 15, 1913, at age 67, James Frank Hopkins died and was buried in the village cemetery at Mabelvale, Arkansas.

== See also ==
- Sigma Nu
- VMI
