= Etihad Airways fleet =

List of aircraft operated by Etihad Airways

Etihad Airways operates a fleet of narrow-body and wide-body aircraft from five aircraft families: Airbus A320 family, Airbus A350 XWB, Airbus A380, Boeing 777-300ER and Boeing 787 Dreamliner.

== Current fleet ==
As of July 2025, Etihad Airways operates the following aircraft.

Etihad Airways fleet
Aircraft	In service	Orders	Passengers					Notes
Aircraft	In service	Orders	R	F	J	Y	Total	Notes
Airbus A320-200	15	—	—	—	16	120	136	
Airbus A320-200	15	—	—	—	8	150	158	
Airbus A320neo	1	—	—	—	8	168	176	Acquired from Bamboo Airways.
Airbus A321-200	9	—	—	—	8	188	196	
Airbus A321neo	6	—	—	—	16	182	198	
Airbus A321neo	6	—	—	—	8	200	208	
Airbus A321neo	6	—	—	—	8	215	223	
Airbus A321LR	1	29	—	2	14	144	160	
Airbus A330-900	—	6	TBA					
Airbus A350-1000	7	20	—	—	44	327	371	
Airbus A380-800	10	—	2	9	70	405	486	3 aircraft in storage with 2 to be reactivated.
Boeing 777-300ER	9	—	—	8	40	280	328	
Boeing 777-300ER	9	—	—	—	40	330	370	
Boeing 777-300ER	9	—	—	—	28	374	402	
Boeing 777-9	—	15	TBA					
Boeing 787-9	35	6	—	8	28	190	226	
Boeing 787-9	35	6	—	—	28	262	290	
Boeing 787-9	35	6	—	—	32	271	303	
Boeing 787-10	10	19	—	—	32	295	327	
Etihad Cargo fleet
Airbus A350F	—	10	Cargo					
Boeing 777F	5	—	Cargo					
Total	108	105						

=== Gallery ===
Hover over each photo to view label detail

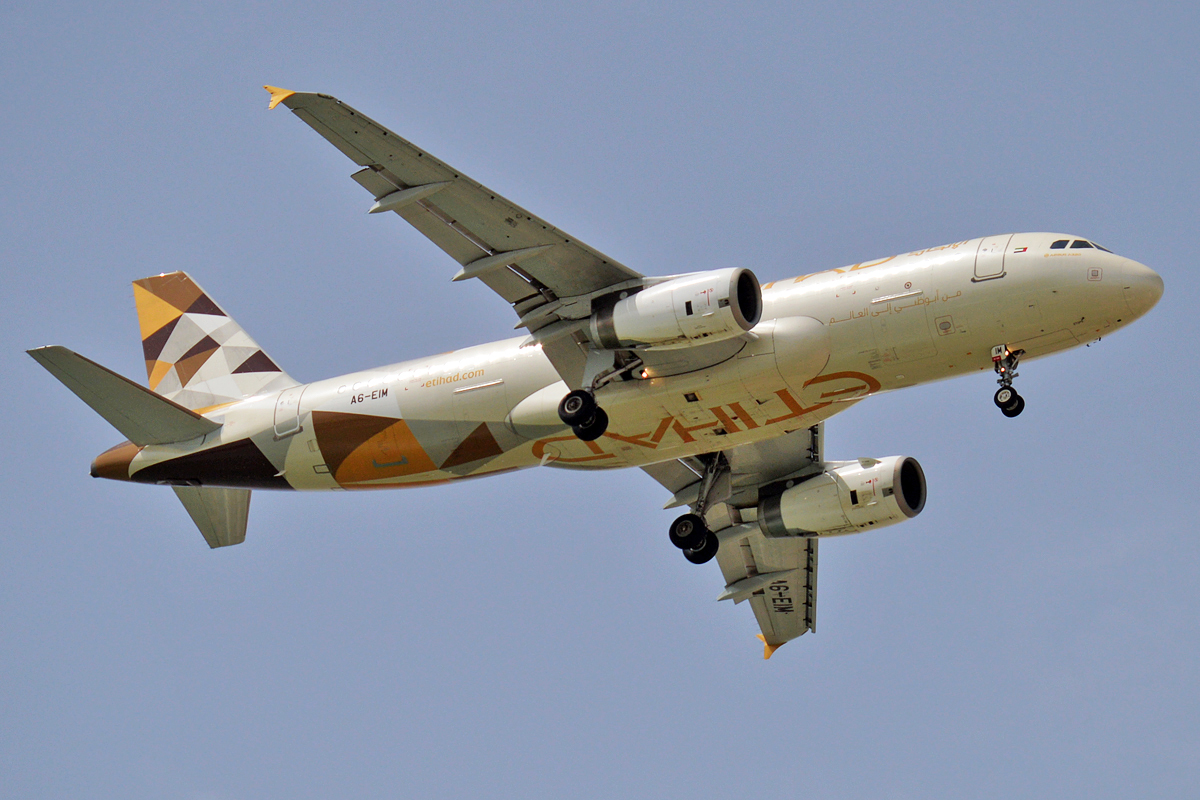
Airbus A320-200

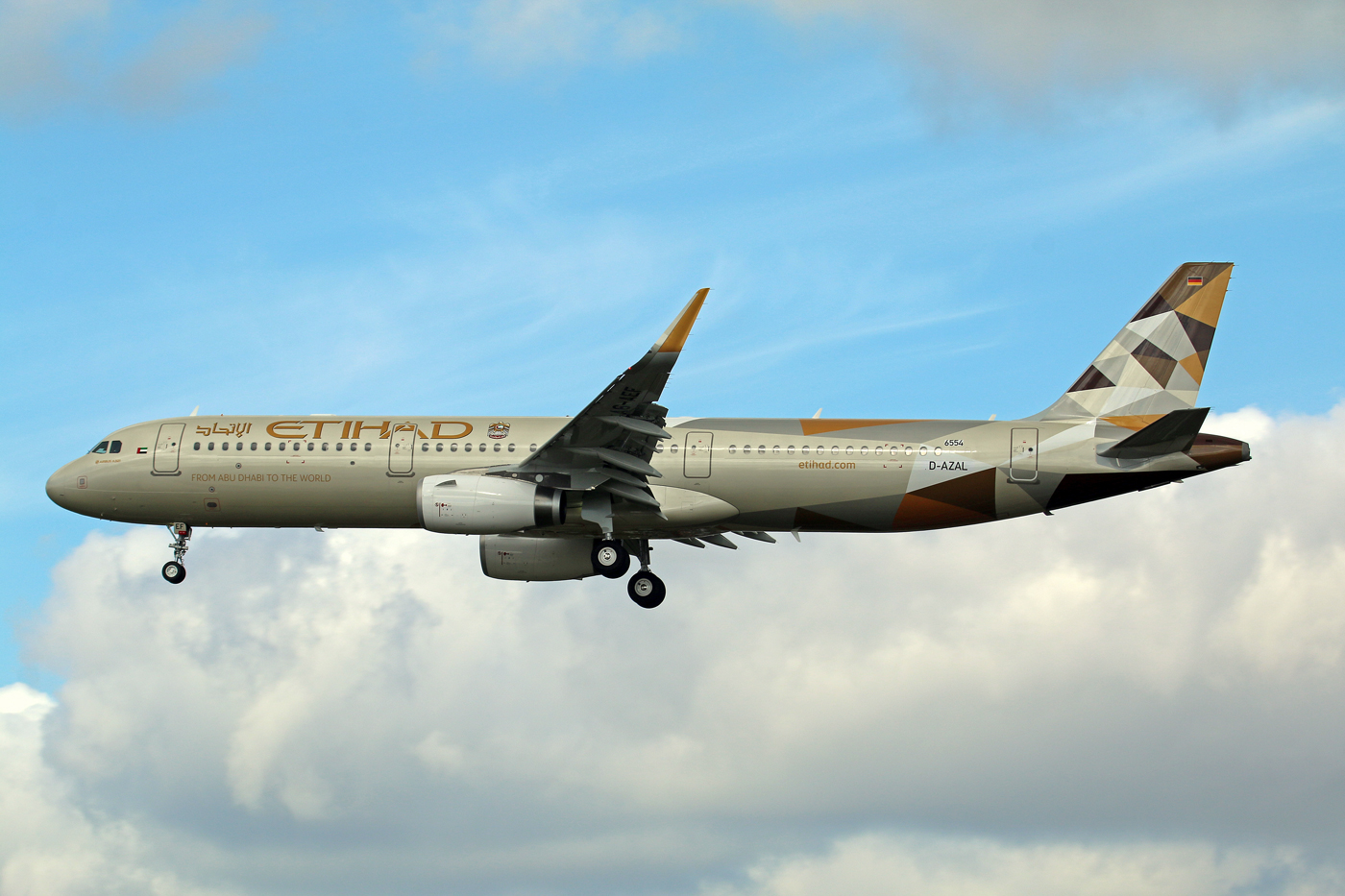
Airbus A321-200

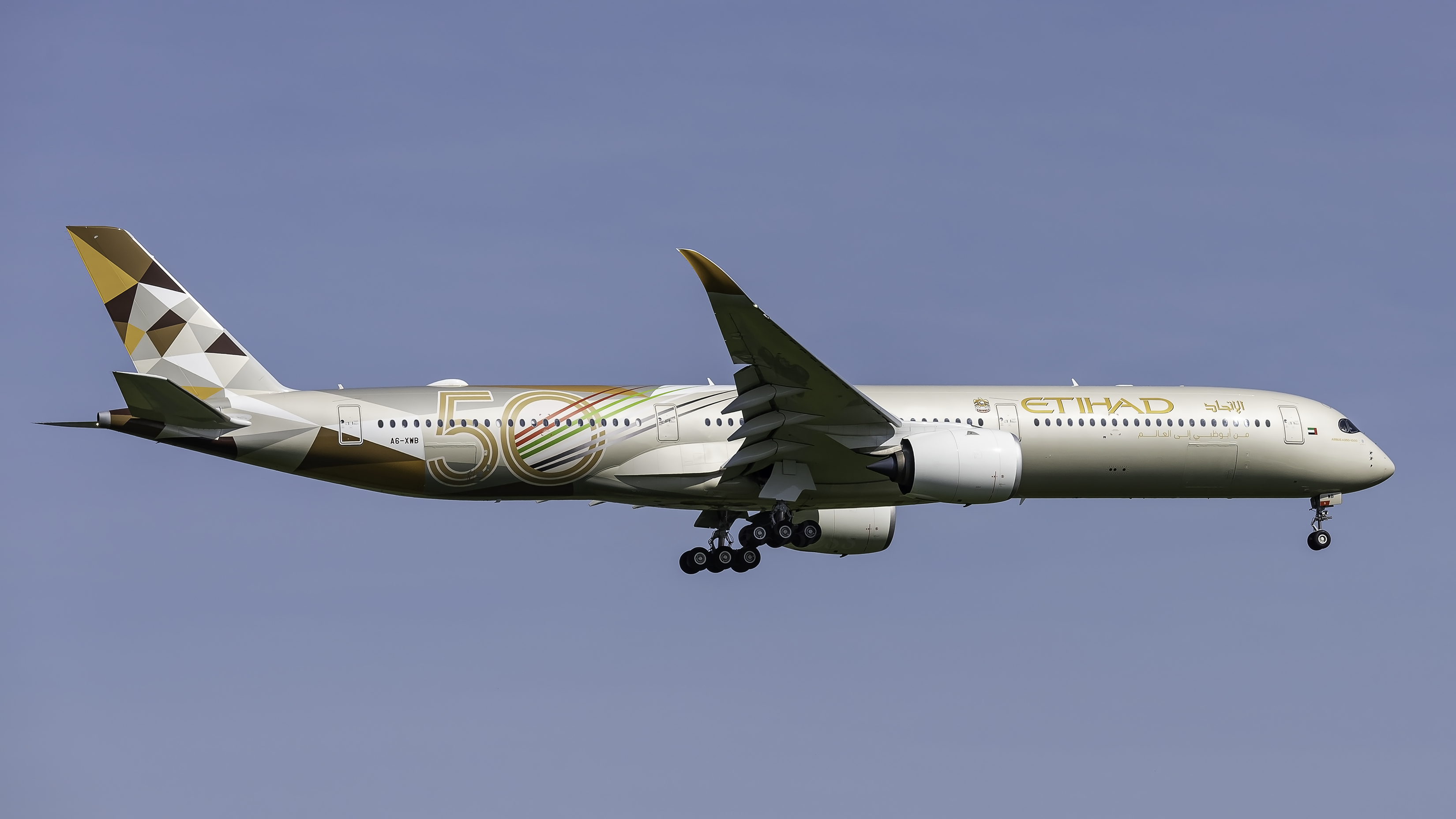
Airbus A350-1000

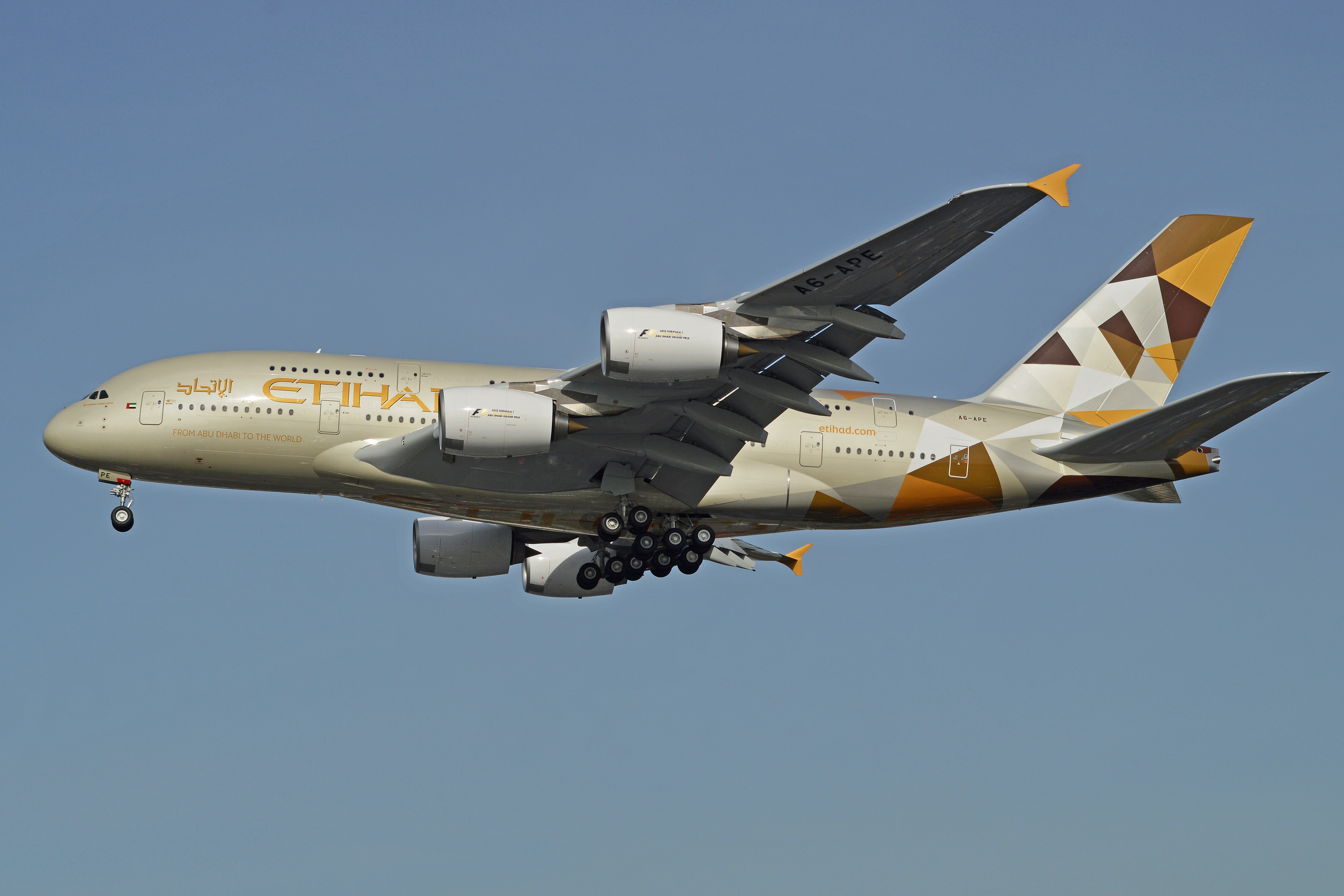
Airbus A380-800

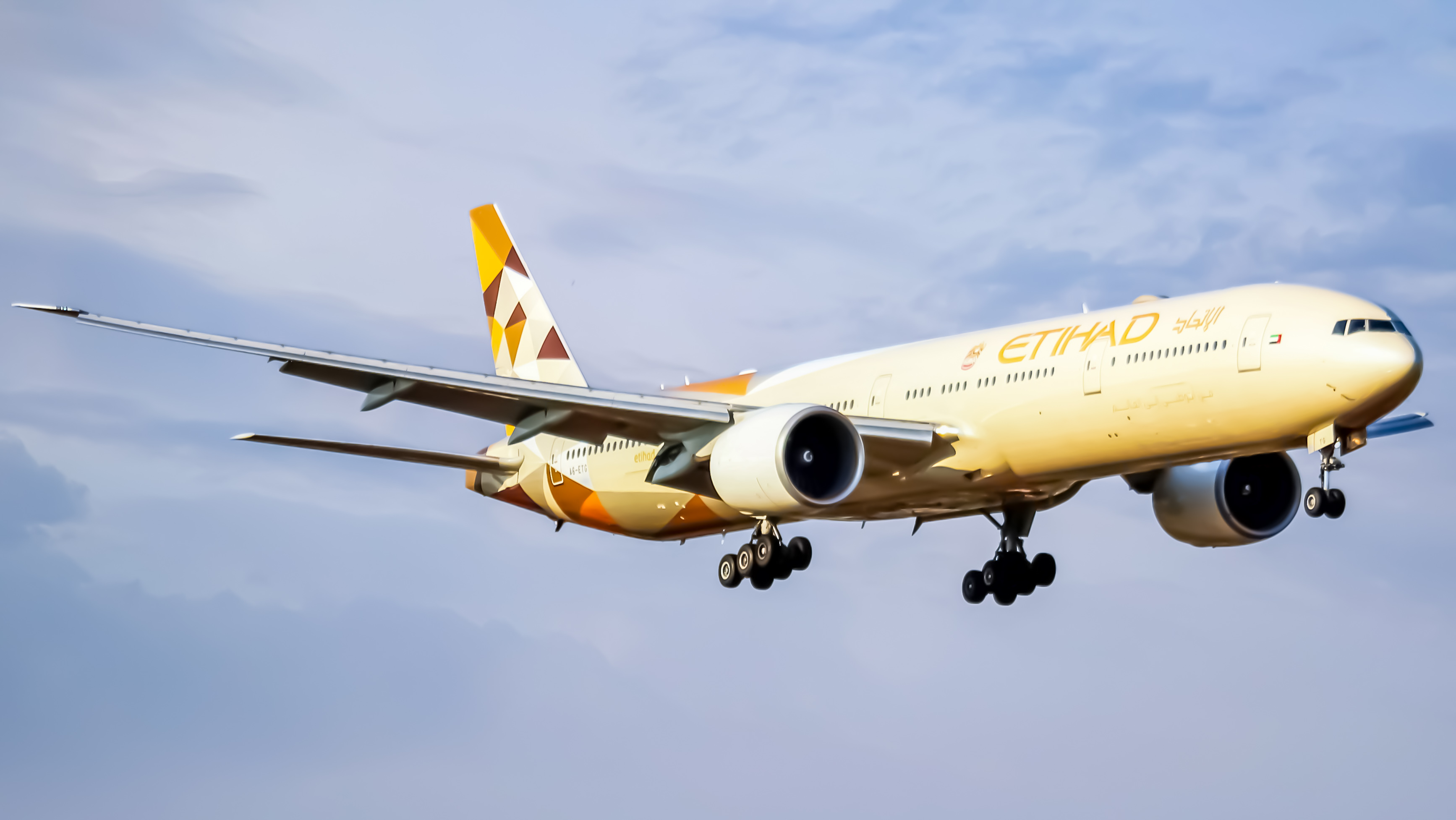
Boeing 777-300ER

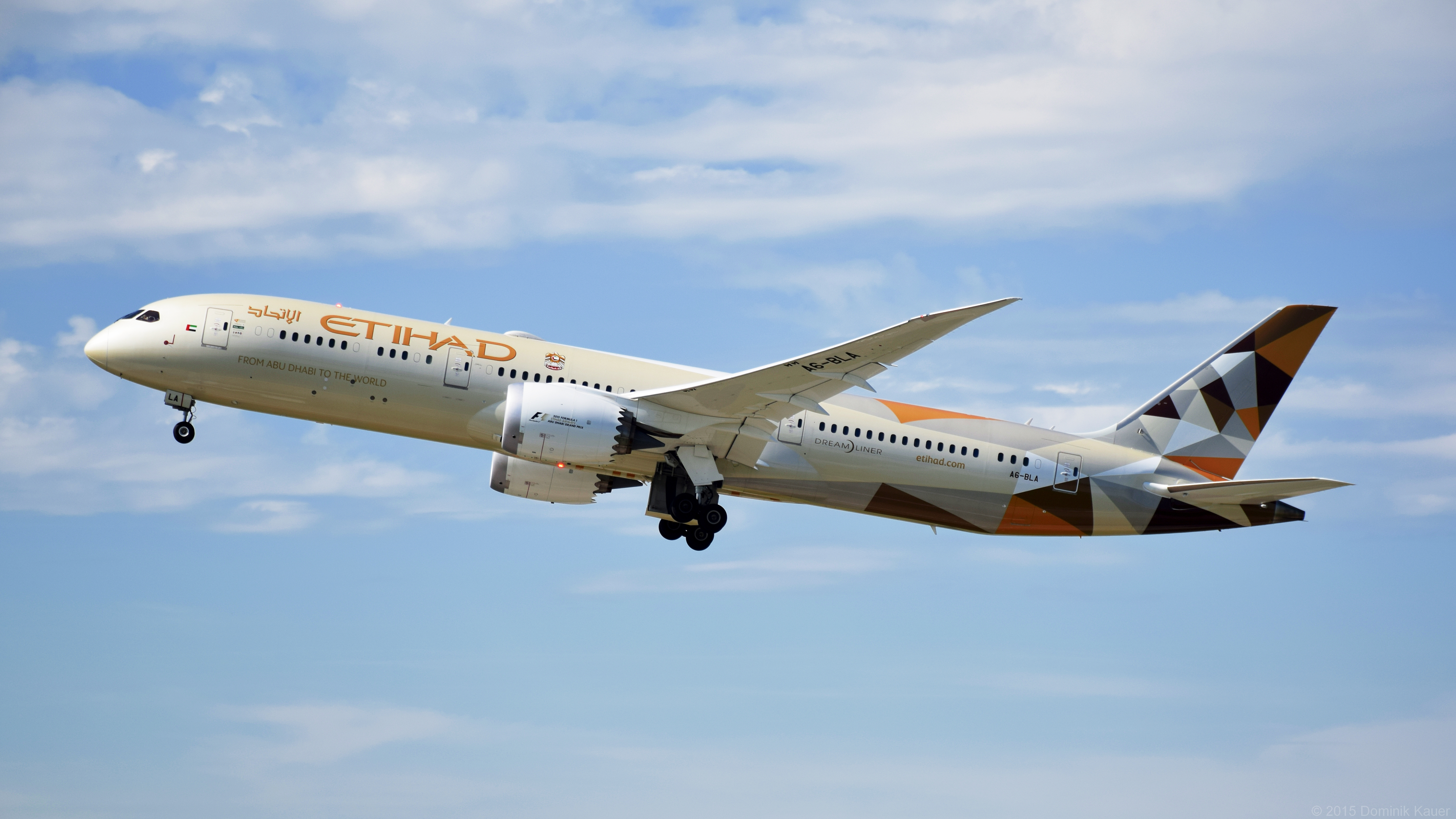
Boeing 787-9

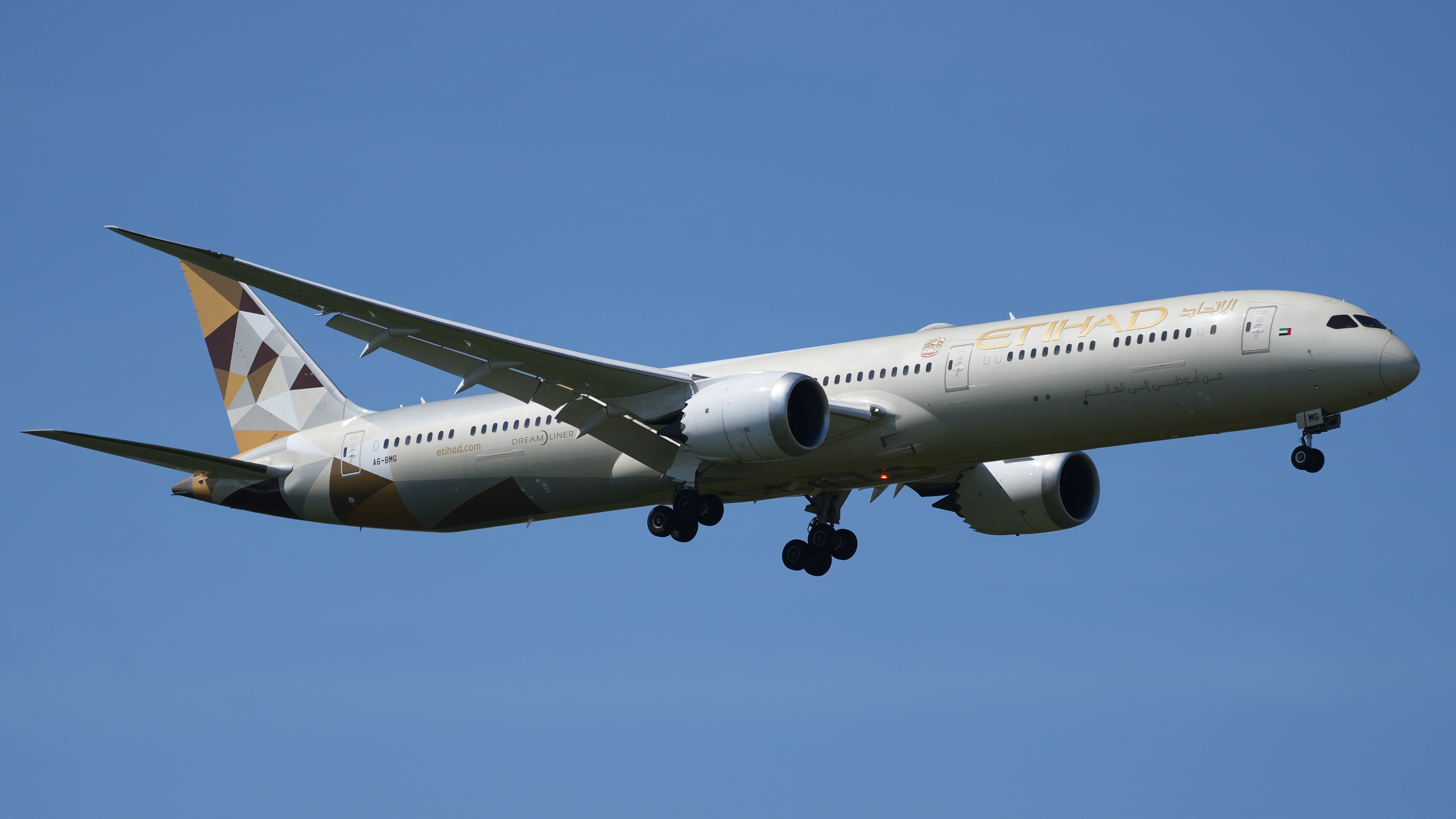
Boeing 787-10

== Historical fleet ==
Etihad had previously operated these types of aircraft:

- Airbus A319
- Airbus A330-200
- Airbus A330-300
- Airbus A340-500
- Airbus A340-600
- Boeing 767-300ER
- Boeing 777-200LR

=== Former Cargo fleet ===
- Airbus A330-200F
- Boeing 747-400F

=== Gallery ===
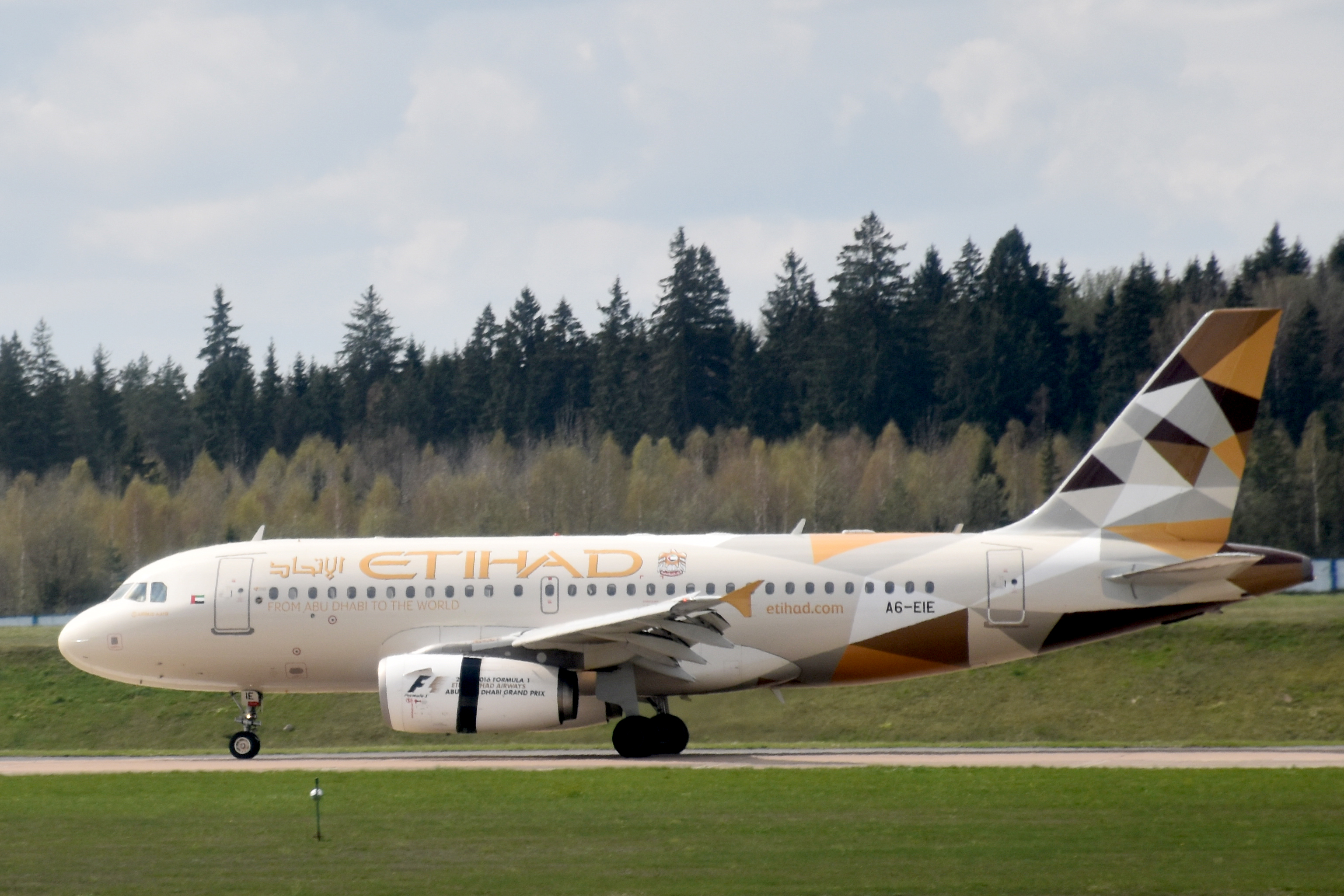
Airbus A319

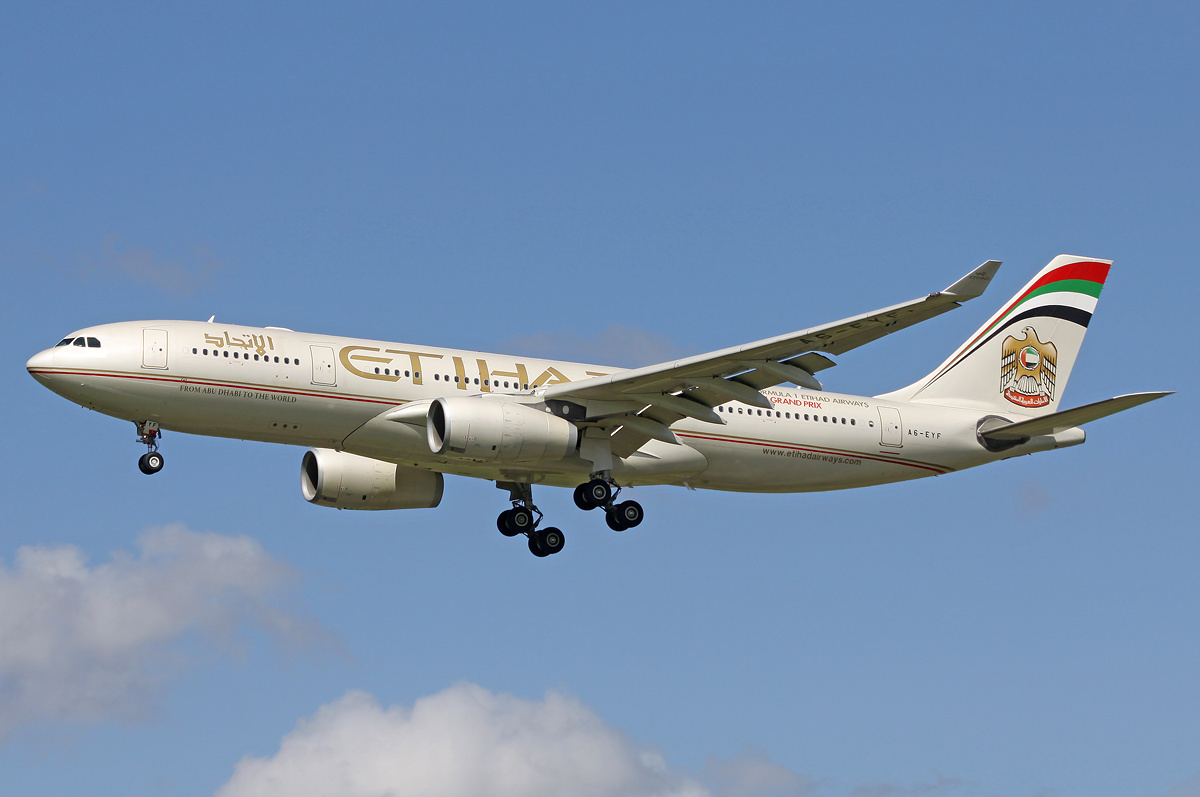
Airbus A330-200

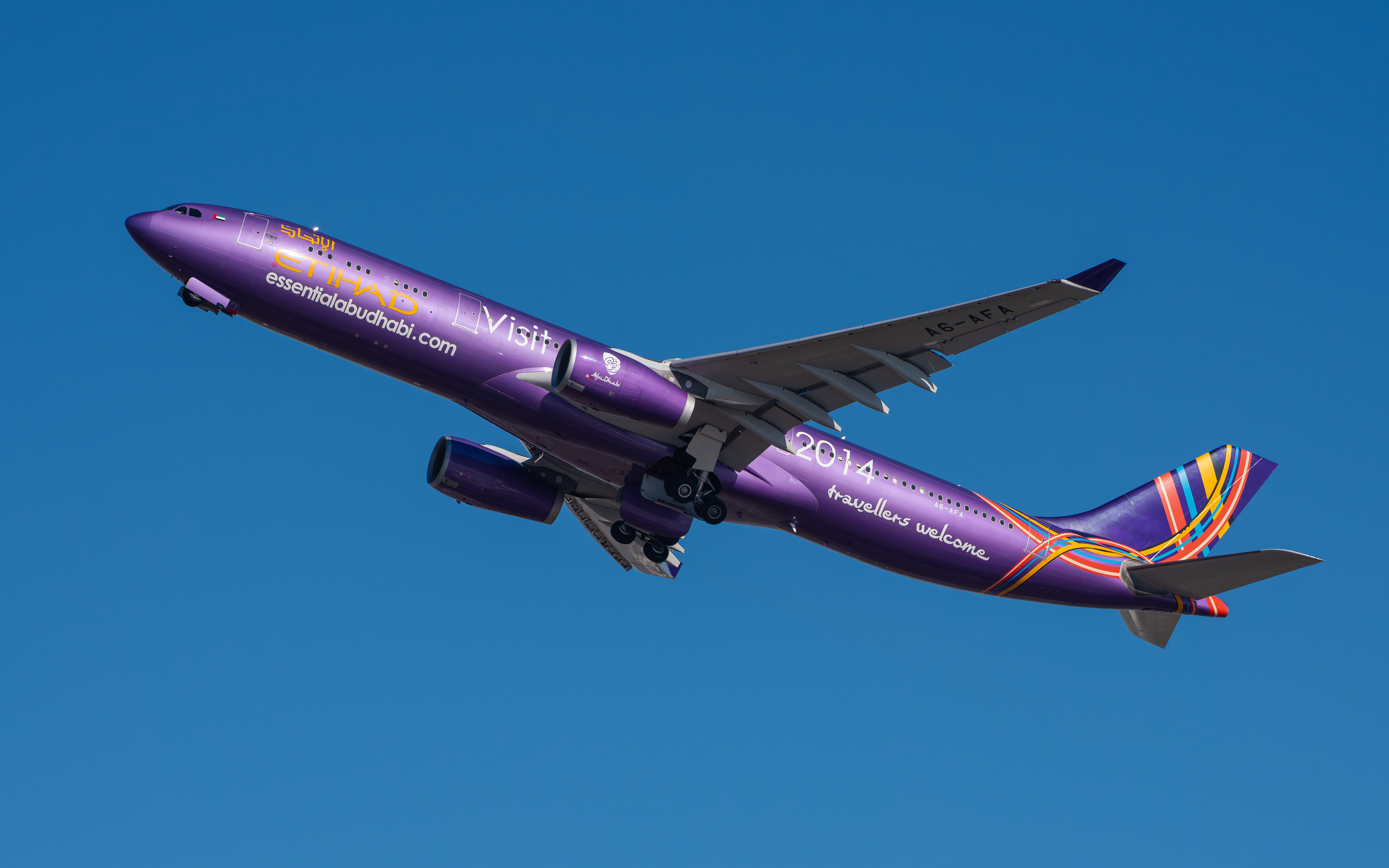
Airbus A330-300 in Visit Abu Dhabi livery

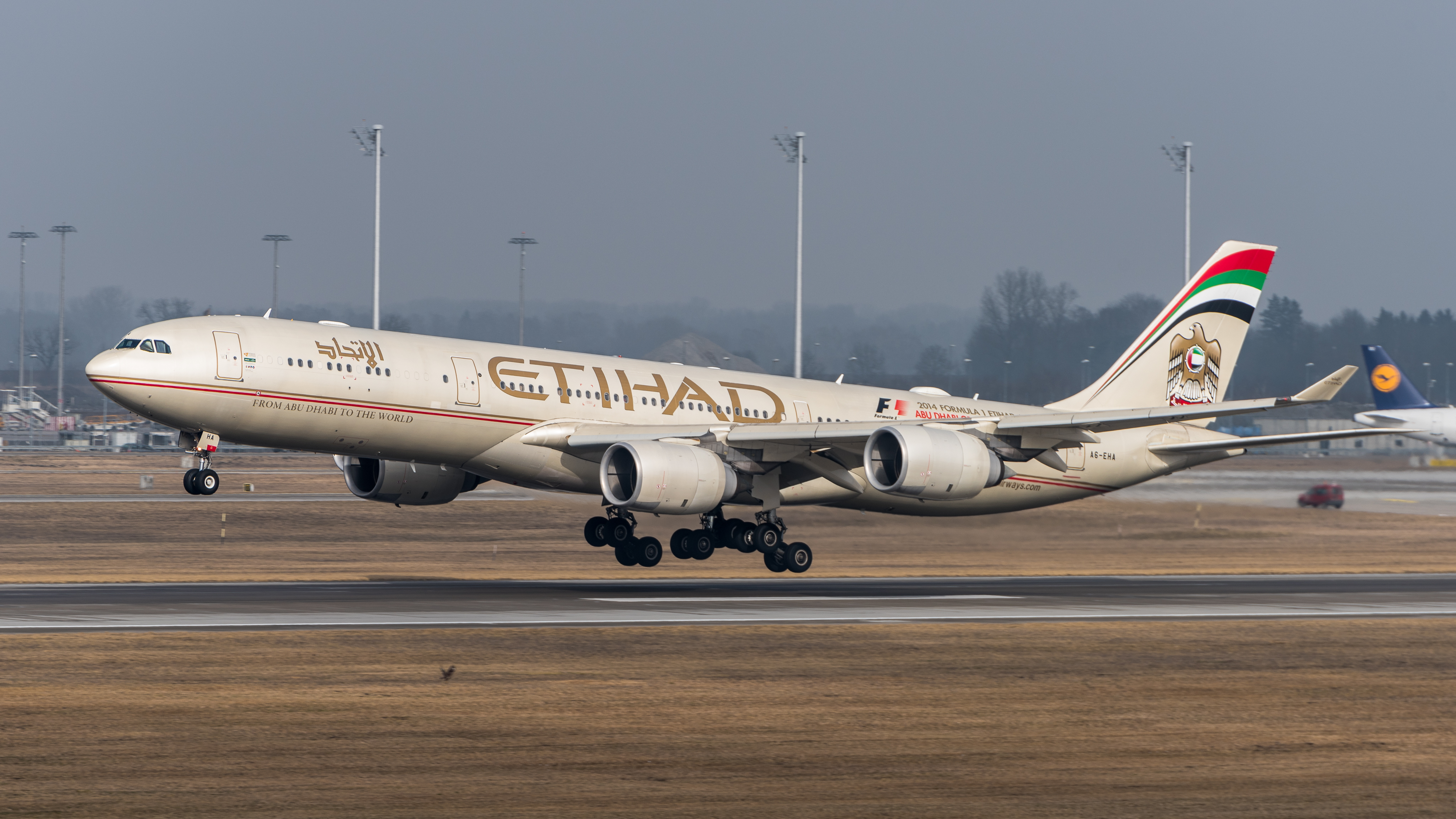
Airbus A340-500

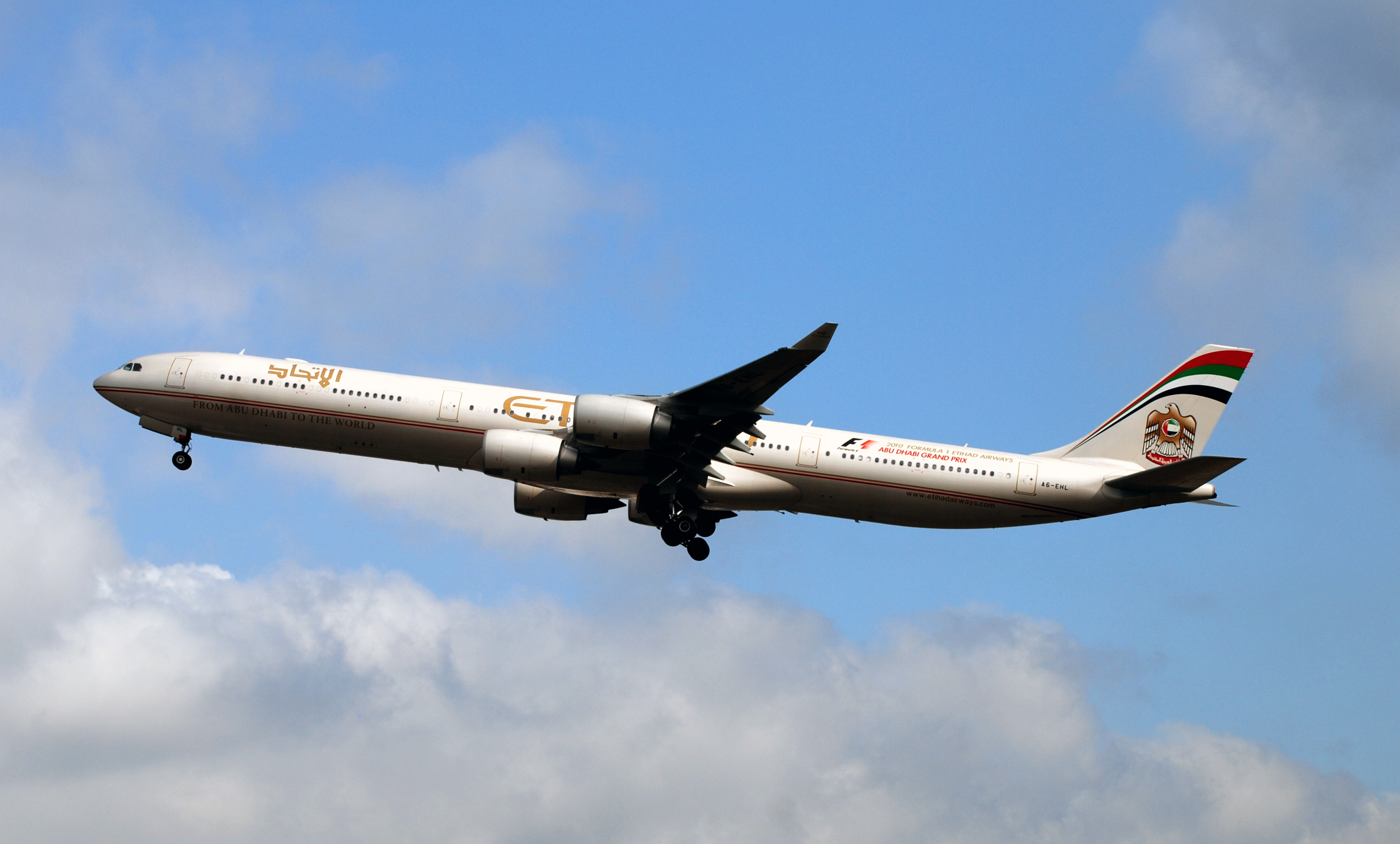
Airbus A340-600

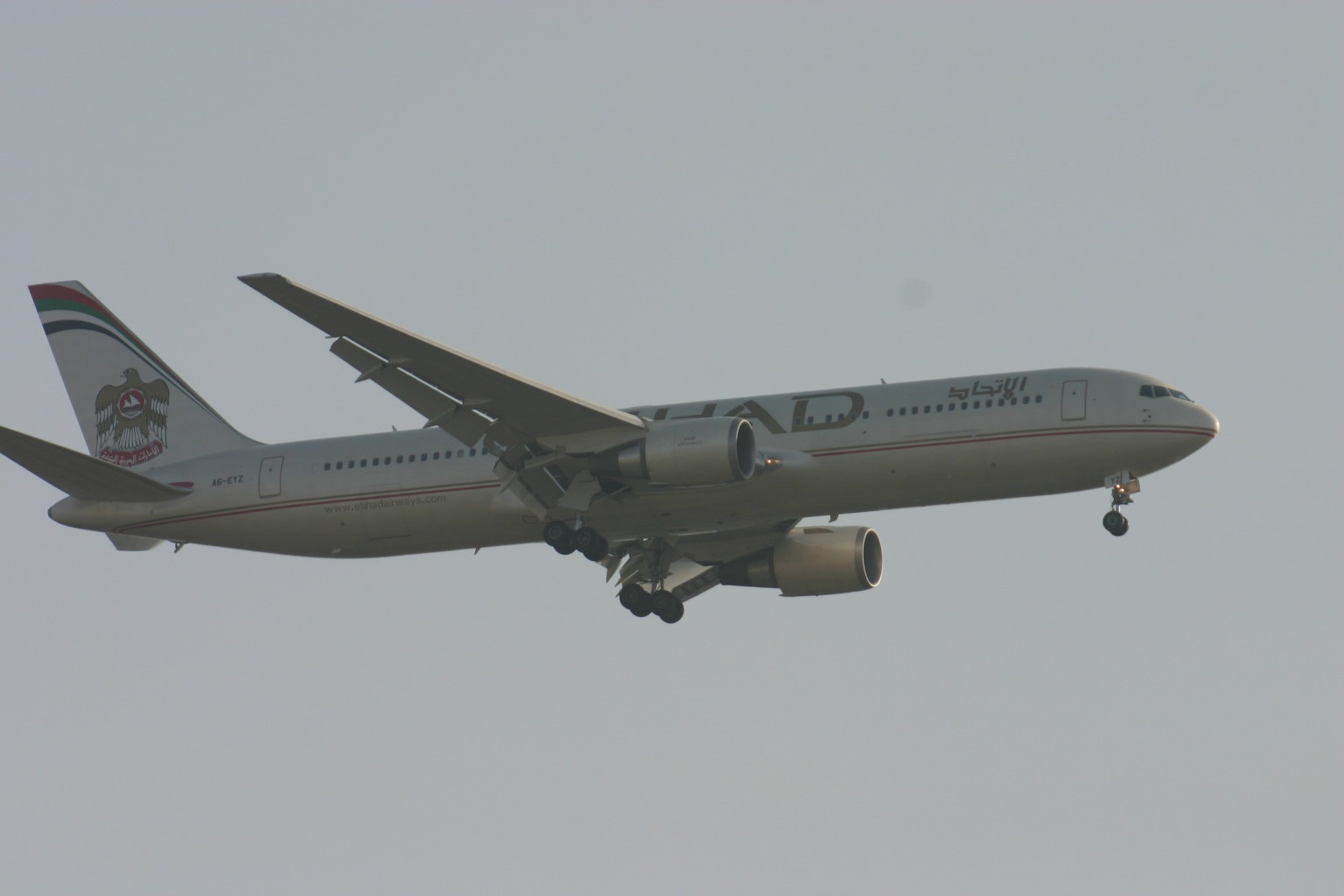
Boeing 767

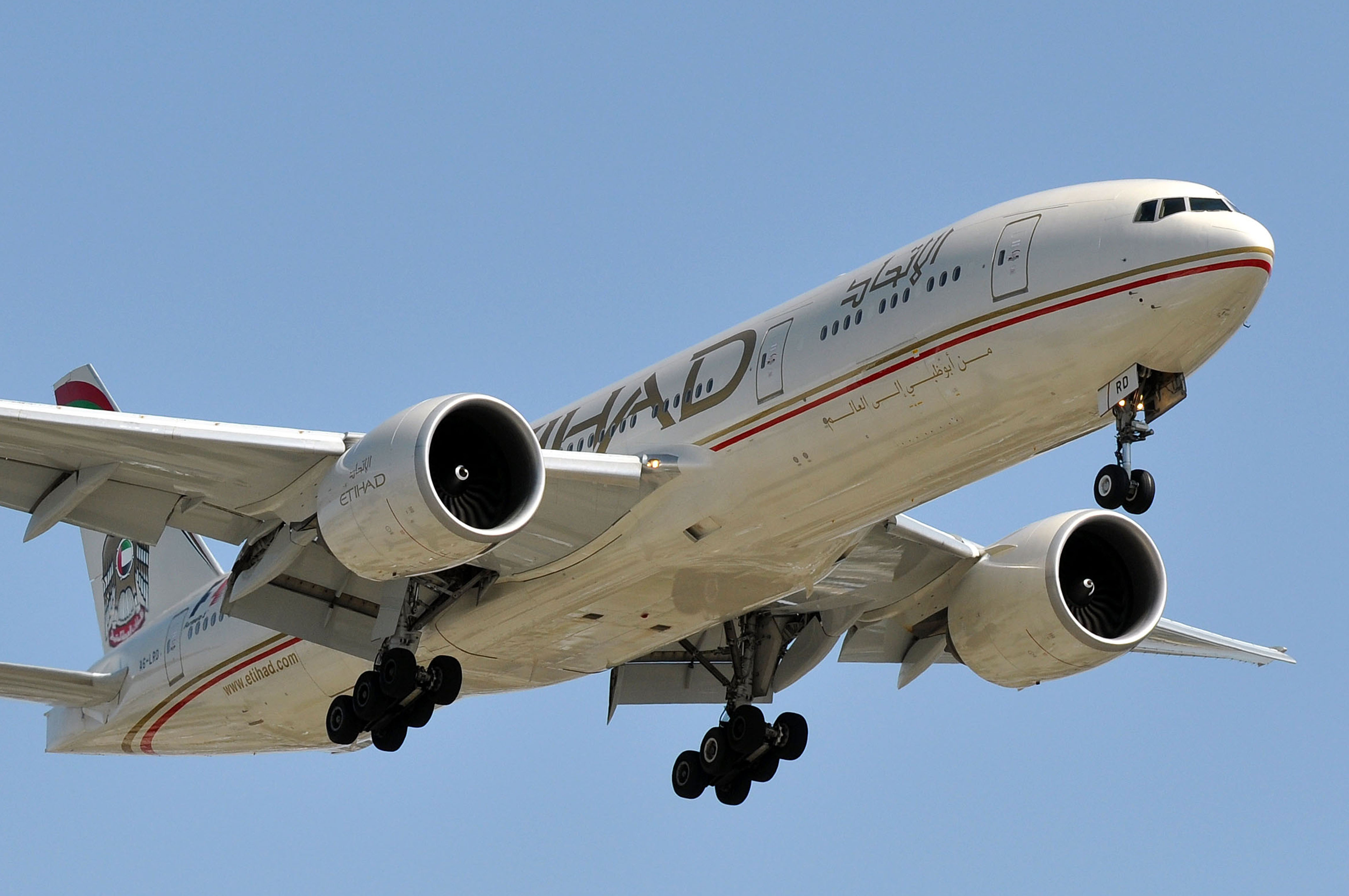
Boeing 777-200LR
