= Airbus A320neo family =

Re-engined version of the A320 family

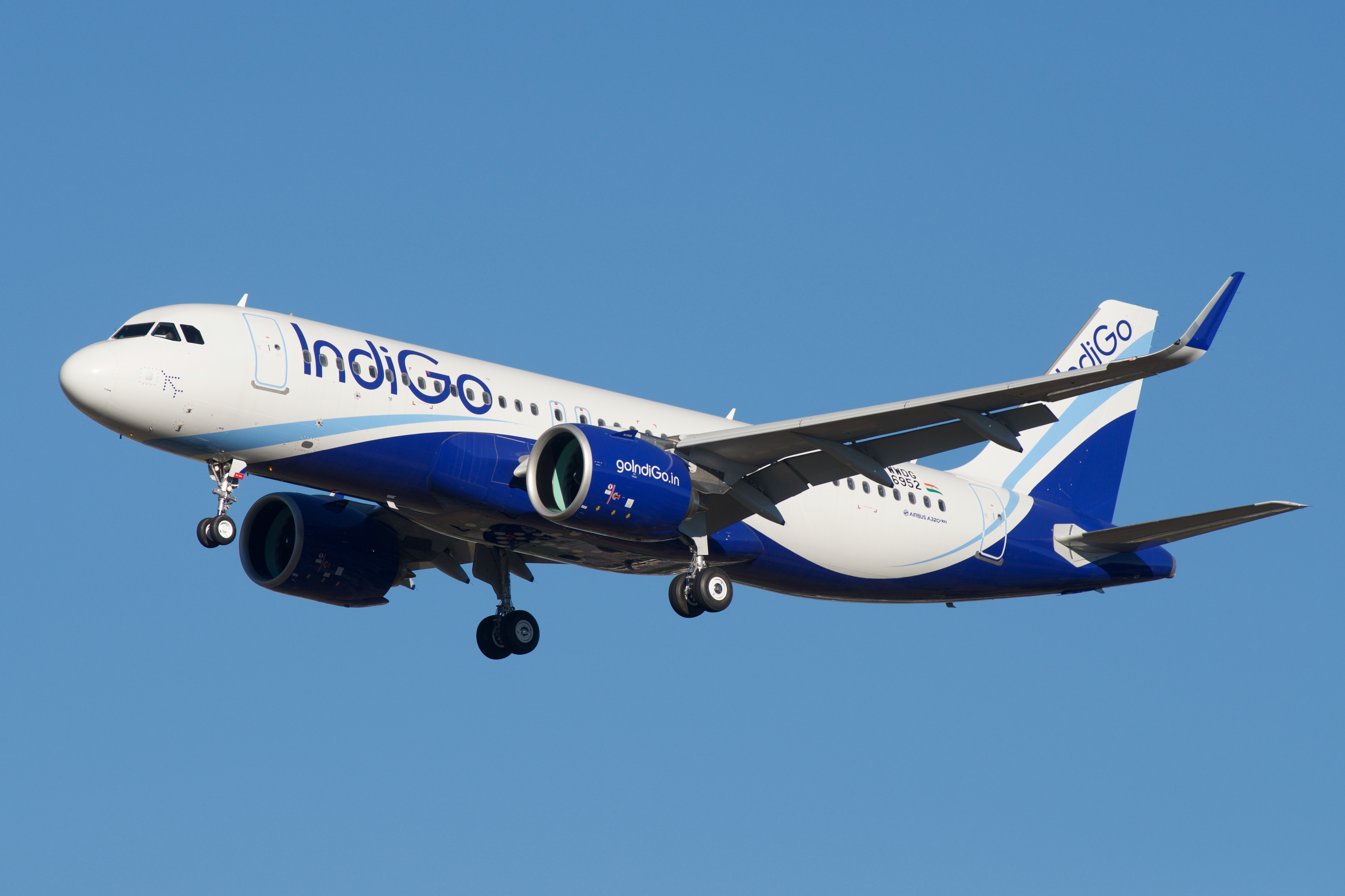
- An A320neo of IndiGo

General information
- Role: Narrow-body jet airliner
- National origin: Multi-national (Note: Final assembly in China, France, Germany and the United States.)
- Manufacturer: Airbus
- Status: In service
- Primary users: IndiGo: Wizz Air; China Southern Airlines; China Eastern Airlines
- Number built: 4,855 as of October 2026

History
- Manufactured: 2012–present
- Introduction date: 25 January 2016, with Lufthansa
- First flight: 25 September 2014; 12 years ago
- Developed from: Airbus A320ceo family
- Variants: Airbus A319neo; Airbus A321neo

The Airbus A320neo family is an incremental development of the A320 family of narrow-body airliners produced by Airbus. The A320neo family (neo being Greek for "new", as well as an acronym for "new engine option") is based on the enhanced variant of the previous generation A319, A320, and A321, which was then retroactively renamed the A320ceo family (ceo being an acronym for "current engine option").

Re-engined with CFM International LEAP or Pratt & Whitney PW1000G engines and fitted with sharklet wingtip devices as standard, the A320neo is 15% to 20% more fuel efficient than previous models, the A320ceo. It was launched on 1 December 2010, made its first flight on 25 September 2014 and was introduced by Lufthansa on 25 January 2016.

IndiGo is the largest customer and operator of the A320neo family with 380 aircraft in its fleet as of October 2026. A total of 12,492 A320neo family aircraft have been ordered by more than 130 customers, of which 4,855 units have been delivered and 4,822 units are in service. The global A320neo fleet had completed more than 24 million flights over 52 million block hours with one hull loss being an airport-safety related accident. By 2019, the A320neo family held a 60% market share against the competing Boeing 737 MAX, and the Comac C919 joined the competition in 2023.

== Development ==
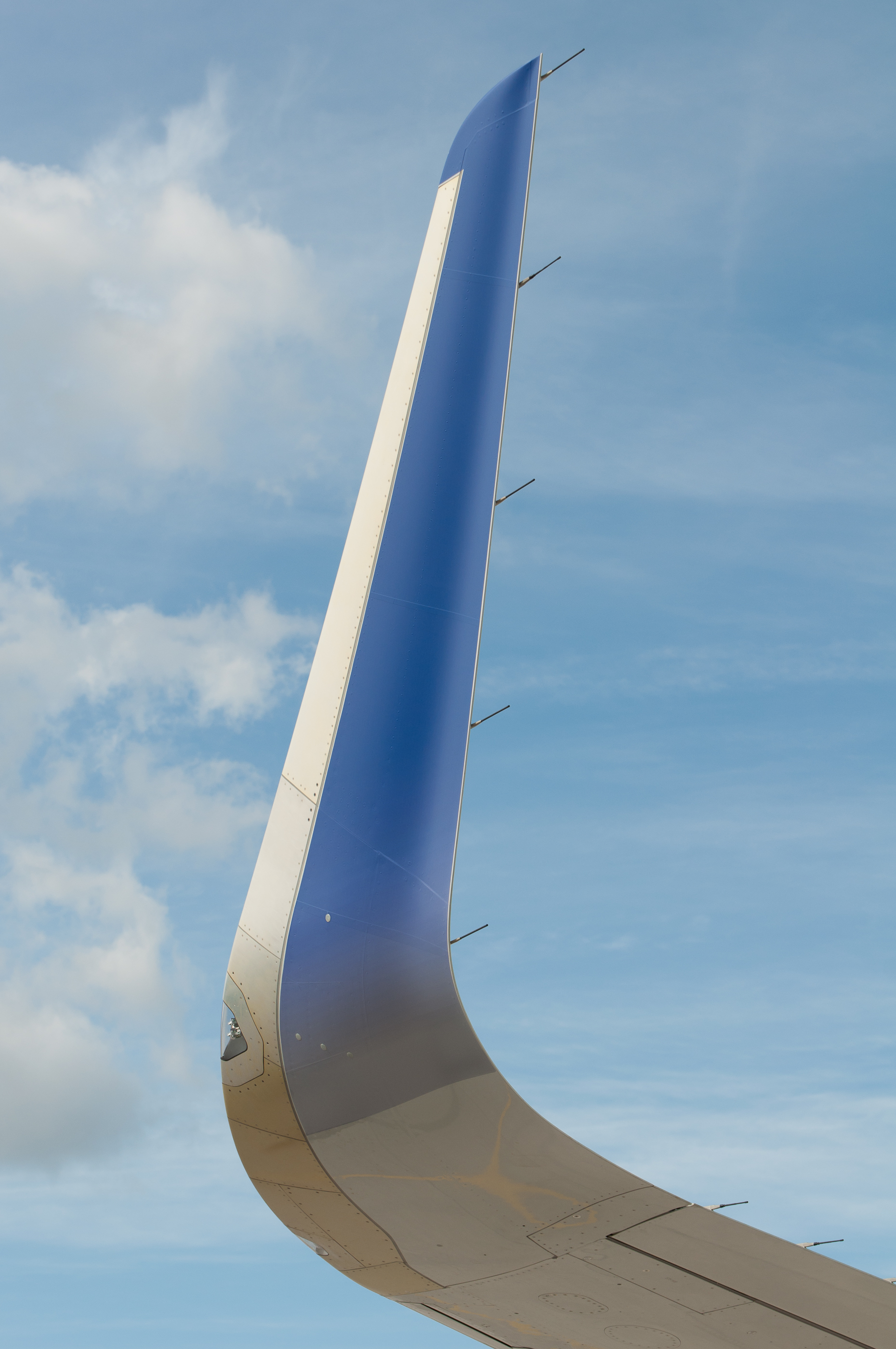
The wing sharklet of an A320neo. These sharklets are an optional add-on for the A320ceo.

In 2006 Airbus started the A320 Enhanced (A320E) programme as a series of improvements targeting a 4–5% efficiency gain with large winglets (2%), aerodynamic refinements (1%), weight savings and a new aircraft cabin. At the time, Airbus' Sales Chief John Leahy said: "Who's going to roll over a fleet to a new generation aircraft for 5% better than an A320 today? Especially if another 10% improvement might be coming in the second half of the next decade based on new engine technology".

Airbus launched the sharklet blended wingtip device during the November 2009 Dubai Airshow. The installation adds 200 kilograms (440 lb) but offers a 3.5% fuel burn reduction on flights over 2,800 km (1,500 nmi; 1,700 mi). The sharklet blended wingtip results in higher available takeoff weights, increased rate of climb and reduced takeoff thrust saving around 2% in engine maintenance costs.

=== New engine option ===
Compared to the re-engine improvement of 15%, an all-new single-aisle would have brought only 3% more gain while high volume manufacturing in carbon fibre could be much more expensive.

Airbus planned to offer two engine choices, the CFM International LEAP-1A and the Pratt & Whitney GTF (PW1100G), with 20% lower maintenance cost than current A320 engines. The new engines burn 16% less fuel, though the actual gain is slightly less as 1–2% is typically lost when installed on an existing aircraft.

At the February 2010 Singapore Air Show, Airbus said its decision to launch was scheduled for the July 2010 Farnborough Air Show. On 1 December 2010, Airbus launched the A320neo "New Engine Option" with 500 nmi (930 km; 580 mi) more range or 2 t (4,400 lb) more payload, and planned to deliver 4,000 over 15 years. Development costs were predicted to be "slightly more than €1 billion [$1.3 billion]". The neo list price would be $6 million more than the ceo, including $3.5 million for airframe modifications and around $0.9 million for the sharklets. The A320neo was slated for service entry in spring 2016, the A321neo six months later and the A319neo six months after that.

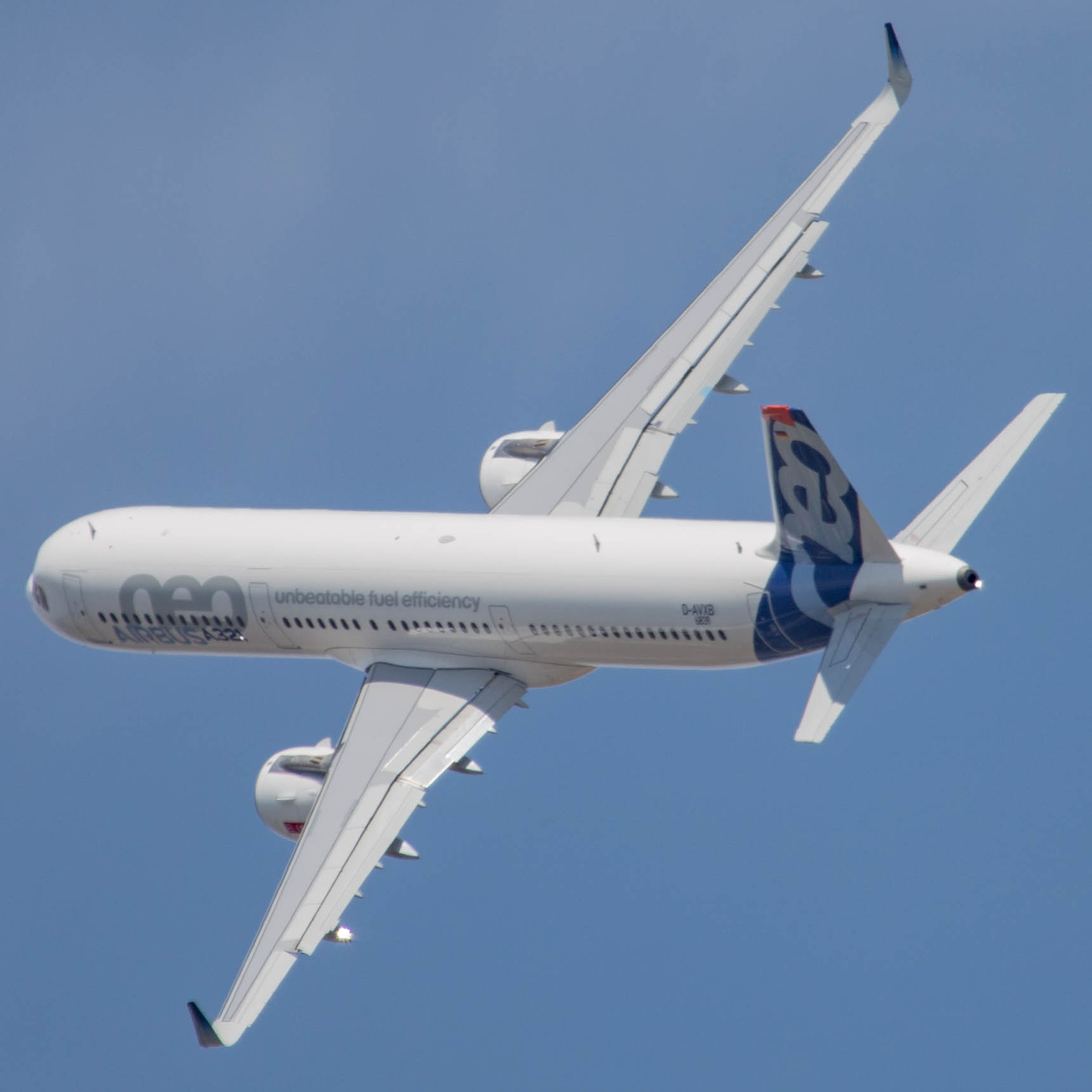
An A321neo prototype with the original exit configuration of four door pairs

The 2010 order for 40 Bombardier CS300s (now known as Airbus A220-300) and 40 options from Republic Airways Holdings – then owner of exclusive A319/320 operator Frontier Airlines – pushed Airbus into the re-engine. Airbus COO-customers John Leahy decided against ignoring the CSeries and allowing it to grow, as Boeing had previously done with Airbus, and instead aggressively competed against Bombardier Aerospace.

Introduction was then advanced to October 2015. Airbus claims a 15% fuel saving and "over 95 percent airframe commonality with the current A320". Its commonality helped to reduce delays associated with large changes. In March 2013, airlines' choices between the two engines were almost equal.

The new "Space-Flex" optional cabin configuration increases space-efficiency with a new rear galley configuration and a "Smart-Lav" modular lavatory design – allowing an in-flight change of two lavatories into one accessible toilet. The "Cabin-Flex" configuration for the A321neo allows up to 20 more passengers without "putting more sardines in the can" by rearranging the door layout of the aircraft. Total fuel consumption per seat is reduced by over 20%, while the rearranged cabin allows up to nine more passengers for the A320neo.

The first Airbus A320neo rolled out of the Toulouse factory on 1 July 2014 and first flight was scheduled for September 2014.

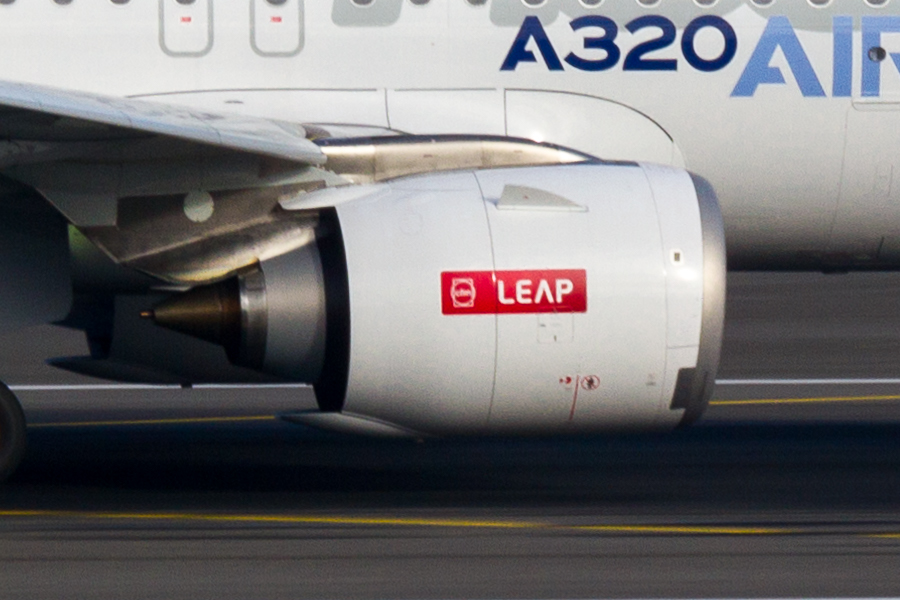
CFM International LEAP-1A engine

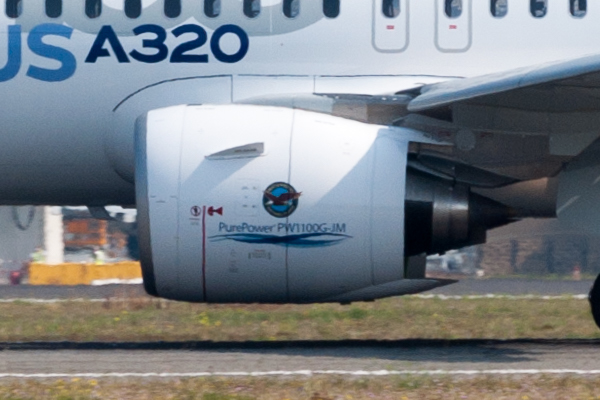
Pratt & Whitney PW1100G engine, also known as the Pratt & Whitney GTF

=== Flight testing ===
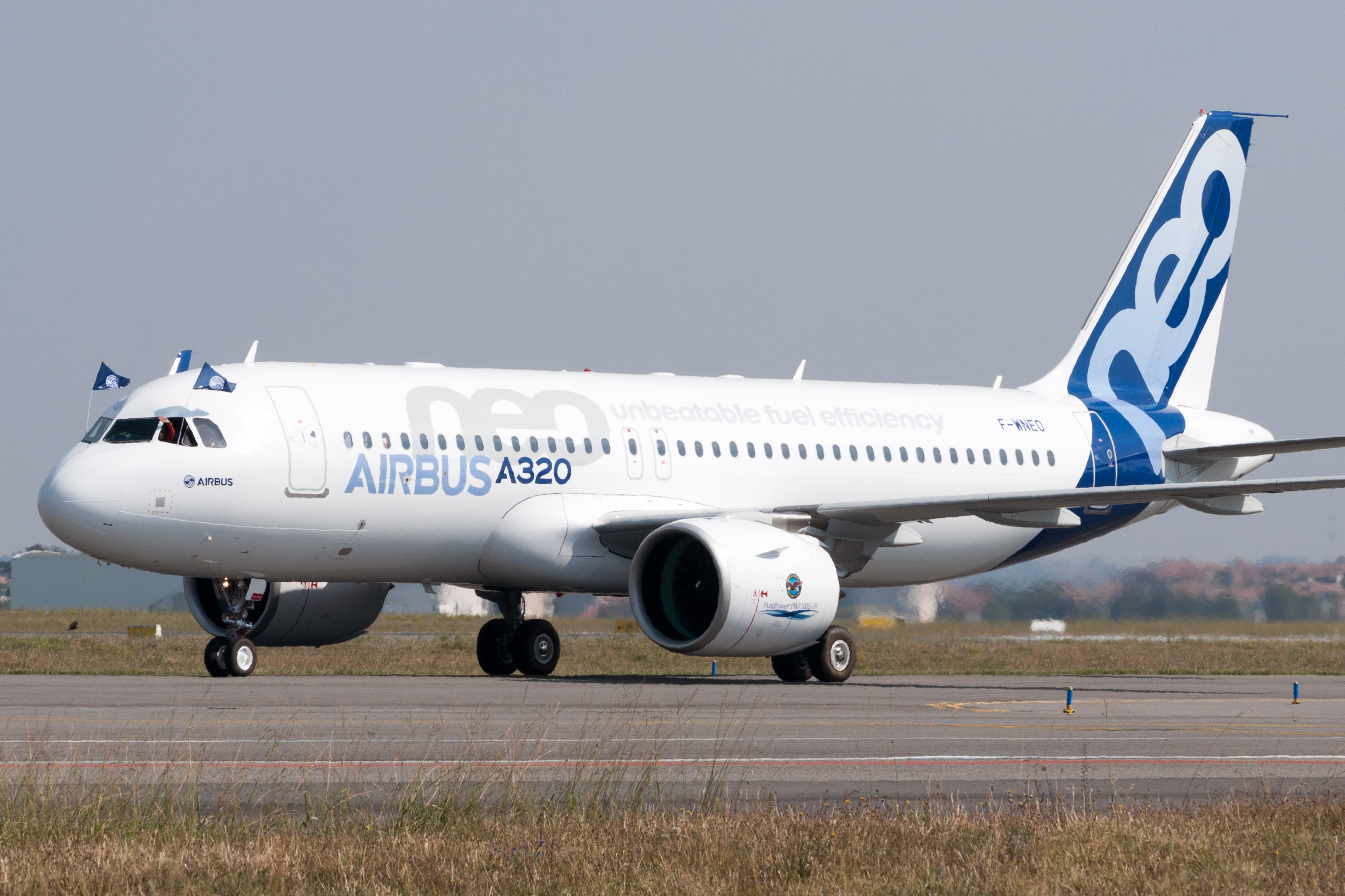
Celebrating the 25 September 2014 first flight with flags from the cockpit

The first flight of the neo occurred on 25 September 2014. Its Pratt & Whitney PW1100G-JM geared turbofan ('GTF') engine was certified by the Federal Aviation Administration (FAA) on 19 December 2014.

After 36 months, the A320neo and A321neo had flown around 4,000 hours for certification of the two powerplant versions. This is about three-quarters of the certification effort of a new design.

Of these 4,000 hours flown, 2,250 were with PW GTFs and 1,770 with CFM LEAPs. The flight test programme was to conclude in 2018 with the completion of A319neo testing. The changes impact flying qualities, performance and system integration; they entailed retuning the fly-by-wire controls and meeting type certification requirements which have evolved since 1988, and helped decrease the minimum V speeds. The neo is 1.8 t heavier than the ceo, but take-off and landing performance is the same with a modified rotation law, adjusted wing flap and wing slat angles and rudder deflection increased by 5° to cope with the higher thrust.

The A320neo is half as loud as an A320 at take-off, with an 85-decibel noise footprint. The LEAP-powered A321neo has 83.3 dB flyover noise, substantially lower than the older CFM56 and V2500.

=== Entry into service ===
The first delivery of the aircraft slipped slightly, Lufthansa taking delivery of the first A320neo on 20 January 2016 and deploying it on its first commercial flight from Frankfurt to Munich on 25 January 2016. Two hundred deliveries were targeted in 2017, but as Pratt & Whitney faced ramp-up difficulties, Airbus expected that thirty aircraft would be parked awaiting engines.

=== Production ===
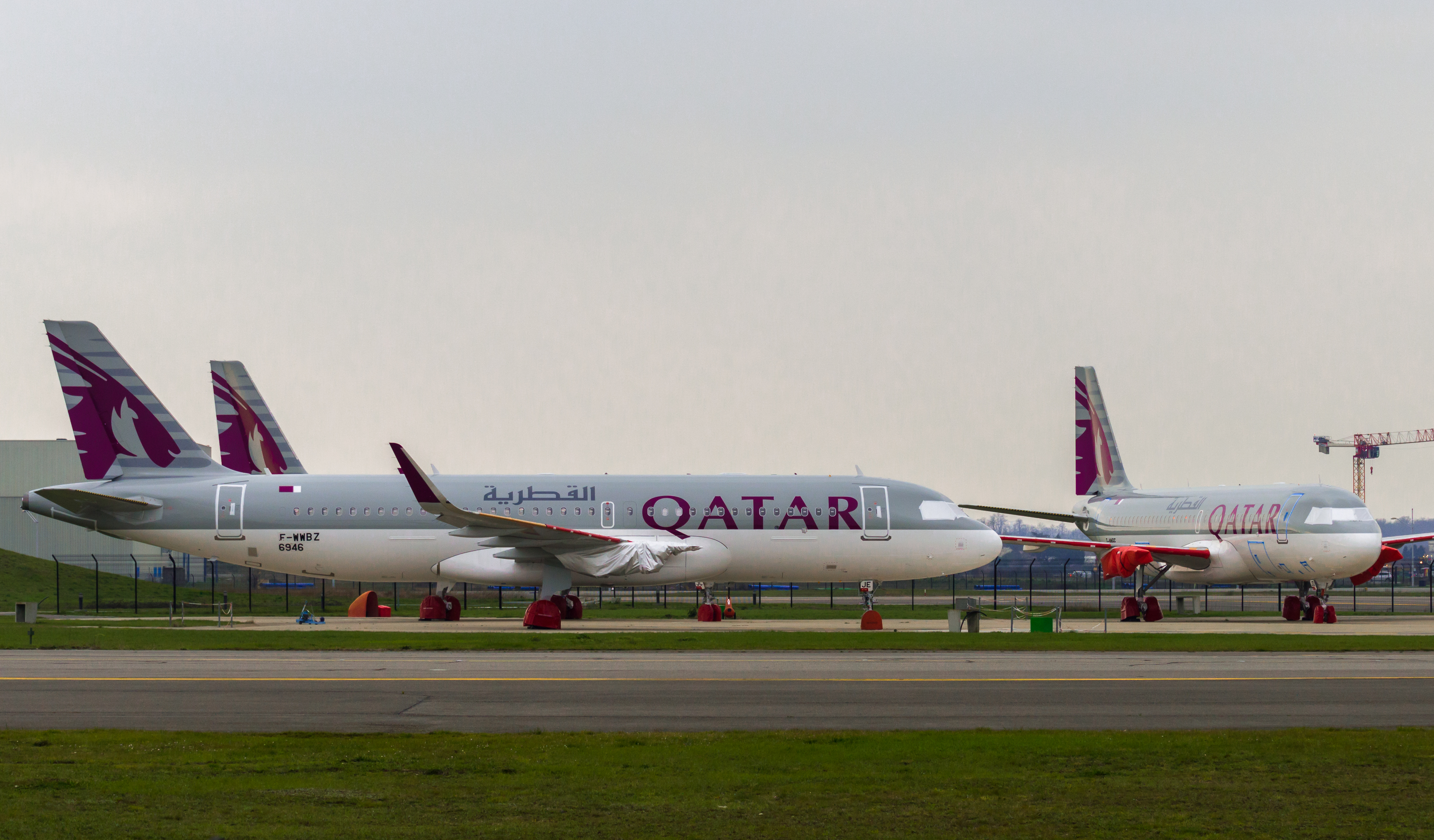
Qatar Airways A320neos waiting for their engines

At the start of production in 2017, Airbus was delivering 50 A320-family aircraft per month, and targeted a production rate of 60 per month by 2019. By October 2017, only 90 A320neos had been delivered, and Airbus acknowledged it would miss its target of 200 deliveries for the year, even with increased fourth-quarter output. More than 40 completed aircraft were parked without engines, but as engine issues were largely resolved by early 2018, Airbus expected that more than half of all A320-family deliveries in 2018 would be neos.

Airbus reiterated its goal of producing 60 narrow-body aircraft per month by mid-2019 and examined higher rates. In April 2018, Airbus confirmed plans to increase monthly output from 55 to 63 in 2018, while studying rates of 70 to 75 aircraft per month beyond 2019, although engine supplier capacity constrained near-term expansion.

In February 2018, following in-flight shutdowns of the PW1100G caused by compressor aft hub and seal issues, the European Union Aviation Safety Agency and Airbus grounded portions of the A320neo fleet until replacement parts were available. Airbus subsequently stopped accepting PW1100G engines, and deliveries of GTF-powered aircraft resumed in May after Pratt & Whitney reverted to the original seal design as an interim fix.

By mid-2018, Airbus expected around 100 completed aircraft to be awaiting engines and aimed to deliver most of them in the second half of the year, targeting more than 800 total deliveries for 2018. The backlog of parked aircraft declined from a peak above 100 to 86 by the end of June. The 500th A320neo-family aircraft was delivered in October 2018.

==== Production line expansion ====
At the start of the A320neo programme, Airbus was producing the A320 family across six final assembly lines: three at the Hamburg Finkenwerder plant (A318/A319/A321), one at Toulouse–Blagnac facility (A320s), one at the Tianjin, China facility (A319/A320), and one at the Airbus U.S. Manufacturing Facility in Mobile, Alabama (A319/A320/A321).

A seventh final-assembly line in Hamburg, the fourth at that location, opened in July 2017.

By July 2019, with the A321neo accounting for approximately 40% of sales, Airbus began evaluating options to allocate additional production capacity to the stretched variant, including repurposing the former A380 final assembly line in Toulouse. In January 2020, Airbus confirmed the conversion of the A380 assembly line to the eighth final assembly line, dedicated to A321neo production by mid-2022, driven by strong demand for the A321LR and A321XLR variants. To support the A321XLR, Airbus established a dedicated aft-fuselage production line in Hamburg in February 2021 using a former A380 facility, allowing XLR-specific structures to be ramped up without disrupting overall A320neo-family output. In July 2023, Airbus inaugurated the A320neo-family final assembly line in Toulouse.

In October 2025, Airbus opened its ninth and tenth A320neo-family final assembly lines: a second line at its U.S. facility and a second line in Tianjin.

=== Replacement airliner ===
By November 2018, Airbus was hiring in Toulouse and Madrid to develop a clean sheet successor for the A320. Although its launch was not guaranteed, it was expected to arrive from the middle of the following decade, after the A321XLR and a stretched A320neo "plus", and would have competed with the Boeing NMA that was, at the time, expected to be launched as early as 2019. Service entry would be determined by ultra-high bypass ratio engine developments pursued by Pratt & Whitney, testing its Geared Turbofan upgrade; Safran, ground testing a demonstrator from 2021; and Rolls-Royce Plc, targeting a 2025 UltraFan service entry. The production target is a monthly rate of 100 narrow-bodies, up from 60.

At the November 2019 Dubai Airshow, Airbus CEO Guillaume Faury said the company was considering the launch of a single-aisle programme in the second half of the 2020s for an introduction in the early 2030s. In June 2023, Faury said work had begun on eAction, a 20–25% more efficient successor to the A320neo family targeted for a 2035-2040 introduction and more conventional compared to the Airbus ZEROe hydrogen project. At a Civil Aviation Research Council (CORAC) meeting in December 2023, the French government committed €300 million ($330 million) per year to support research and development from 2024 to 2027, including for the CFM RISE open fan demonstrator, while support for hydrogen or electric propulsion receives €65 million. In February 2024, Faury confirmed that the successor aircraft, dubbed Next-Generation Single-Aisle (NGSA), would be designed specifically to run on sustainable aviation fuel to achieve carbon neutrality by 2050.

==== Composite wing ====
In 2015, Airbus started a new wing project, named Wing of Tomorrow (WoT), announced as the "Wing of the future" programme in 2016. A new $1–2 billion carbon-composite wing could be used in the A321neo-plus-plus, compared to $15 billion for a completely new design. The new wing is made from composite material. It is first seen as an upgrade to the existing, mostly metal A320 family wing, which was already upgraded many times. Composite wings are already in use on the A350, but the enhanced, new design will employ highly automated manufacturing suitable for inexpensive high-volume production. Announced in January 2016, a €44.8 million facility was built in Filton, with 300 engineers. The new wing design and tests take place in this Filton facility. Other Airbus locations in the UK, France, Spain and Germany are working with 30 partners on this wing project.

In May 2021, Airbus announced that for improved aerodynamic performance the wing will be longer and thinner with folding wingtips to access existing airport gates. By May 2021, assembly of the first demonstrator was to start in the coming weeks, as the project should be completed by 2023 before an eventual product launch. A “radical” A320 makeover is expected to cost over 4 billion euros ($4.9 billion, £3.7 billion), significantly less than the estimates of $15 billion to $20 billion for an all-new Boeing design.(£11 billion to £15 billion). Due to the increased length and increased lift, the new wings could also be used on an Airbus A322, an A321 lengthened by 4 passenger seat-rows, being studied by Airbus.

The current A320neo family wingspan of 36m with an aspect-ratio of 9 will be extended by ground-folding wingtips to 45m with an aspect-ratio of 14. Additional semi-aeroelastic hinges could lead to 52m wingspan with an aspect-ratio of 18, still fitting in a standard 36m airport gate. In September 2021, Airbus announced starting the assembly of in total 3 full-size "Wing of Tomorrow" prototypes. The first prototype was completed in December 2021. The flapping wing section flight tests are targeted to begin in late 2023. In June 2023, GKN Aerospace announced a further progress by delivering the first fixed trailing edge for the “Wing of Tomorrow”. It is manufactured in a high-rate low-cost resin transfer moulding out of autoclave composite process, which supports the targeted low-cost of Airbus by avoiding an autoclave.

== Operational history ==
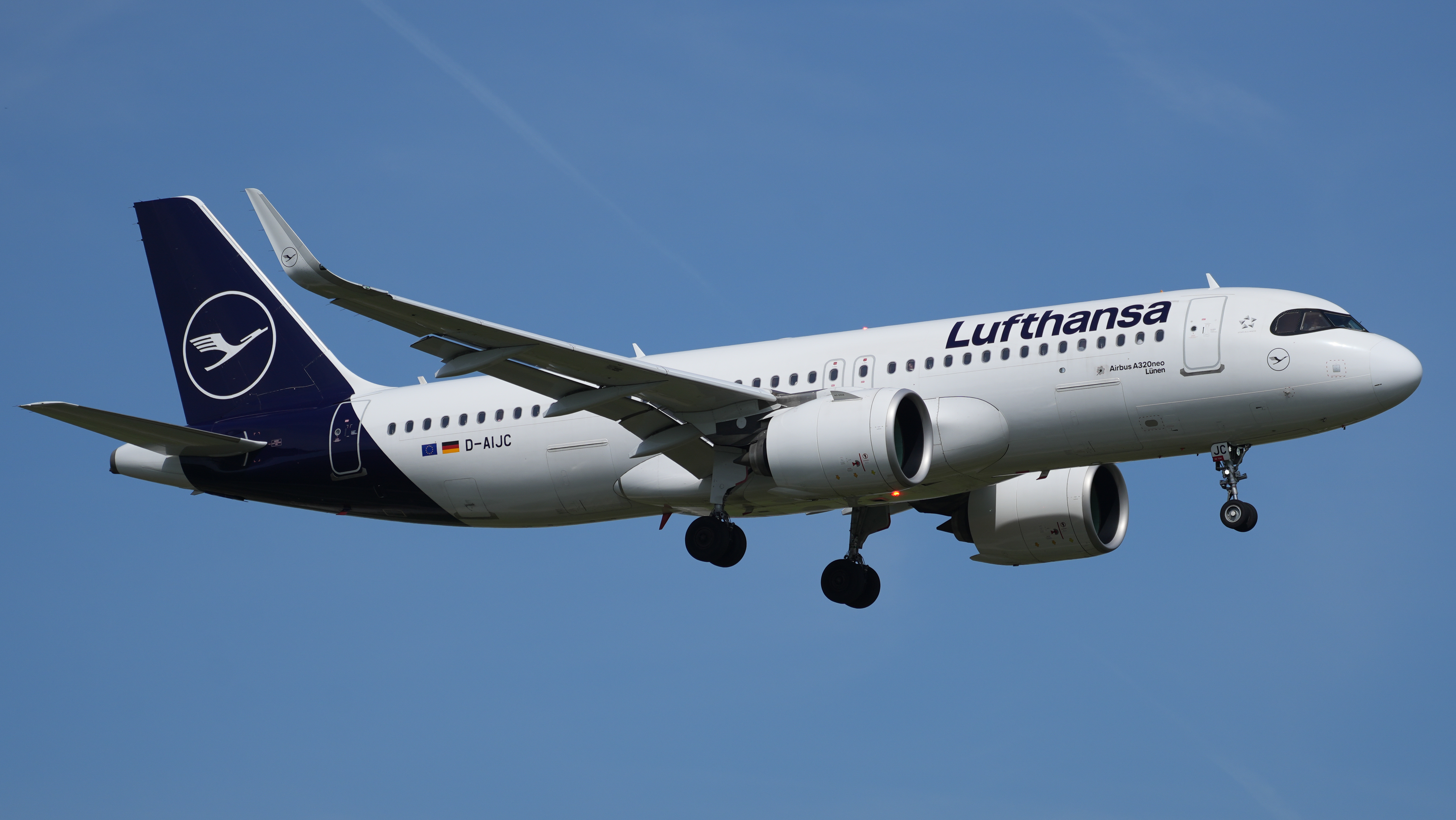
Lufthansa confirms the 16% fuel savings but temporarily blocked the last seating row due to centre-of-gravity concerns.

By January 2019, three years after its introduction, 585 neos were in commercial service with over 60 operators, led by IndiGo (87), Frontier Airlines (33) and China Southern (26). Lufthansa confirms the PW 16% fuel savings, 21% per seat with denser 180-seat layout up from 168, while Avianca states its LEAPs are 15–20% more efficient, quieter, reduce oil consumption and routine maintenance. Starting both GTFs initially took 6–7 min up from the A320ceo's 2 min, improving to 2–3 min by late 2017, still longer than the ceo. LEAP production bottlenecks led to early delivery delays, with no significant repercussions at Avianca or AirAsia; AirAsia's dispatch reliability is comparable to its ceos.

On 30 November 2021, two years after receiving the 1,000th member of the A320neo family, IndiGo took delivery of the 2,000th, an A321neo (MSN 10654) at Airbus Hamburg site.

In February 2026 Spirit Airlines sold two for breaking up. Having only entered service in December 2021 and July 2022, these were the youngest ever twin jet aircraft retired for this purpose.

As of September 2026, the global A320neo fleet had 99.7 percent operational reliability in the last six months and completed more than 24 million flights over 52 million block hours since its entry into service.

=== Engine and dispatch reliability ===
Engine vibration affects one GTF in 50, leading to premature replacement, but spare engine pools compete with new production: at Lufthansa, dispatch reliability has remained stagnant since service entry and is below its 99.8% goal, with a utilization rate 20% below its ceos. P&W cites a 99.91% dispatch reliability for GTF-powered neos, higher than other new engine introductions, while Airbus reports a 99.6% dispatch reliability. With engine deliveries resuming, there were expected to be fewer than 10 engine-less neos at the end of 2018; Airbus is on track to reach its target rate of 60 deliveries per month by mid-2019. Of the 6,362 orders, 2,456 are for CFM LEAP engines (38.6%), 1,869 for Pratt & Whitney GTFs (29.4%), and 2,037 for an as-yet unspecified engine choice (32%). By 30 June 2019, Safran claimed the Leap has a 61% market share on the A320neo family, with 44 airlines operating 454 Leap powered aircraft having accumulated 3.3 million flight hours. In early 2022, 57% of in service A320neos were fitted with Leap engines, and 43% with PW1100G engines.

=== Flight control software update ===
In July 2019, Airbus disclosed two outwardly similar, though separate, issues which could result in excessive pitch up behaviour, one affecting the A320neo and the other the A321neo. Both issues were detected during analysis and laboratory testing, and have not been encountered in actual operation. Airbus has addressed the issues through temporary revisions to the flight manual, including loading recommendations and a change to the centre-of-gravity envelope, and expected to release updated flight control software in 2020. As Lufthansa waited for the 2020 flight software update, it blocked the last row of its aft-heavy layout of 180, offering only 174 seats.

=== Multifunctional Runway Light (MFRL) ===
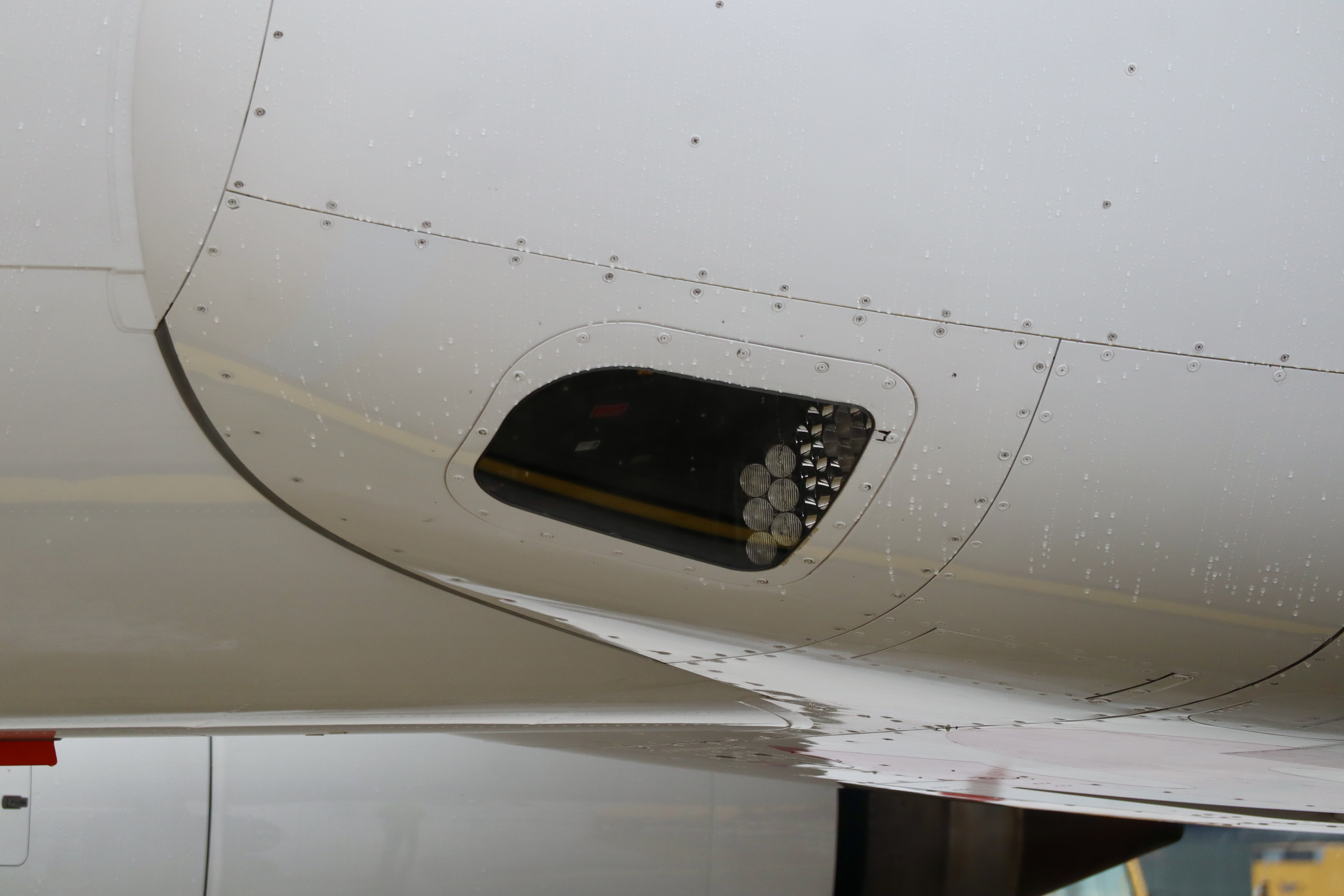
The MFRL on an Austrian Airlines A320neo

The Multifunctional Runway Light (MFRL) is an exterior lighting system introduced by Airbus for the A320neo family. It replaces multiple separate lighting units, including the retractable landing light and the nose gear-mounted lights (takeoff, taxi, and runway turnoff lights), with a single LED lighting unit located at the front of the centre wing box.

Compared with earlier retractable lighting systems, the MFRL reduces aerodynamic drag, lowers weight, and improves reliability.

The system is standard equipment on the A321XLR and is available as an option on other A320neo family aircraft. Operators include United Airlines, Lufthansa, Air France-KLM, International Airlines Group and Hanjin Group.

=== Synchronized Targeted Embodiment Point (STEP4) ===
In 2026, Airbus announced STEP4 improvements for the A320 Family. The main A320neo improvements include the Cobra Duct, which is the APU air intake moved to the top of the fuselage, better corrosion protection, a stronger cabin floor and increased LED lighting.

Further STEP4 upgrades include new flight control laws, the eRudder and improved data management systems.

Airbus will introduce these technologies in different stages across the A320neo, A321neo and A321XLR, rather than giving every aircraft the same upgrades.

== Variants ==
Airbus offers three variants of the A320neo family: the A319, A320 and A321. A neo variant for the Airbus A318 was not proposed but could be developed should demand arise.

=== A319neo ===
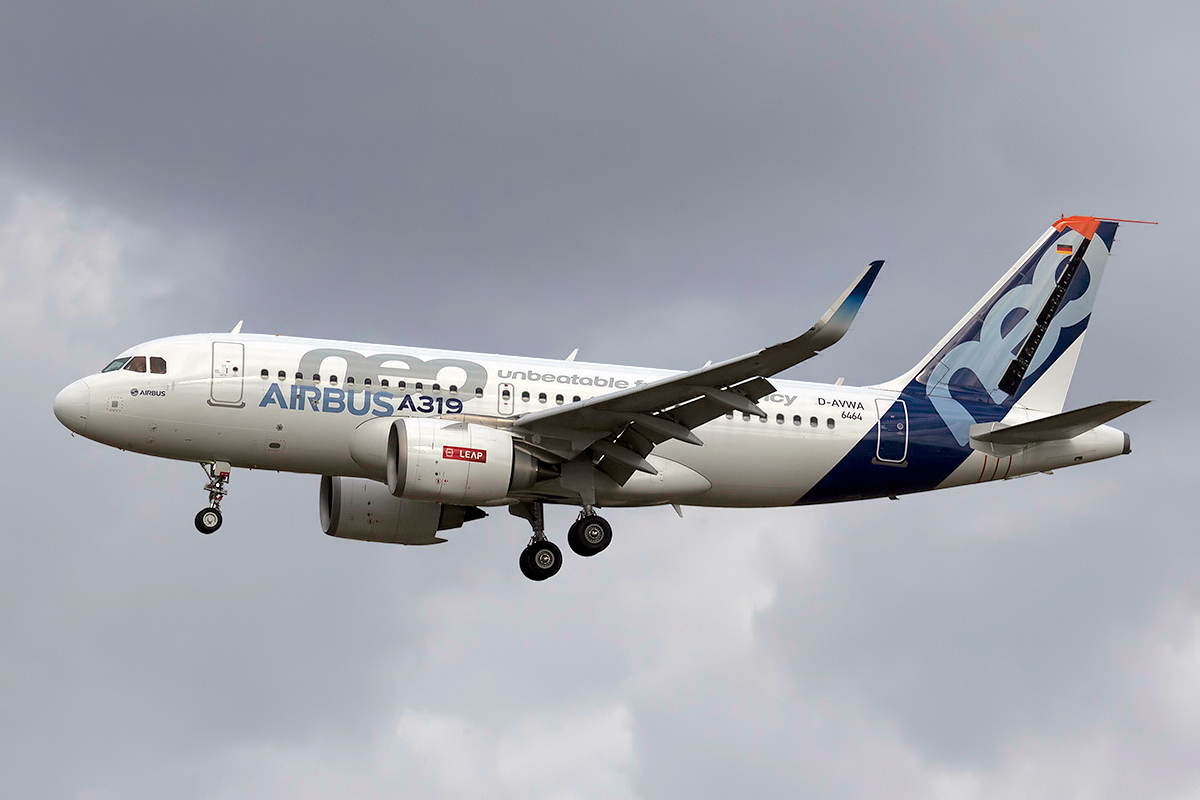
An A319neo prototype in flight

The shortened-fuselage A319neo variant can seat up to 160 passengers or 140 in two classes, with a range of up to 3,750 nmi (6,940 km; 4,320 mi) and improved takeoff performance, while its ACJ derivative can fly eight passengers 6,750 nmi (12,500 km; 7,770 mi) or 15 hours.

The A319neo made its first flight on 31 March 2017, powered by CFM LEAP engines. After 500 flight hours, the LEAP-powered A319neo achieved FAA/EASA Type Certification by 21 December 2018, allowing it to enter service in the first half of 2019. At the time 53 aircraft had been ordered, including 17 with LEAP engines: 12 for Avianca, 4 for an unconfirmed Chinese operator (later revealed to be China Southern Airlines, which became the launch operator), and 1 ACJ319neo; and 36 with no engine selection: 8 for Avianca, 26 for unannounced customers, and 2 ACJ319neos. As of December 2018, certification of the PW1100G-powered version was planned for the end of 2019, with the same test aircraft to be converted during the first quarter and undergo 200 hours of flight testing. In 2018, an A319neo list price was US$101.5 million.

Interest in the variant has been low, and in January 2019 the A319neo's order backlog was only a fraction of that of the A220, following confirmation of orders from jetBlue and Breeze Airways for 60 A220s each. In January 2019, Airbus confirmed that it had no plans to discontinue the A319neo programme, although it expects fewer orders due to competition with the A220-300.

The Pratt & Whitney-powered variant made its maiden flight on 25 April 2019. It gained EASA type certification by the end of November 2019, after 90 flights over 240 hours.

As of May 2021, six ACJ319neo aircraft had been ordered. On 18 February 2022, China Southern Airlines received the first of its order of four A319neo with CFM LEAP engines.

=== A320neo ===
==== Timeline ====
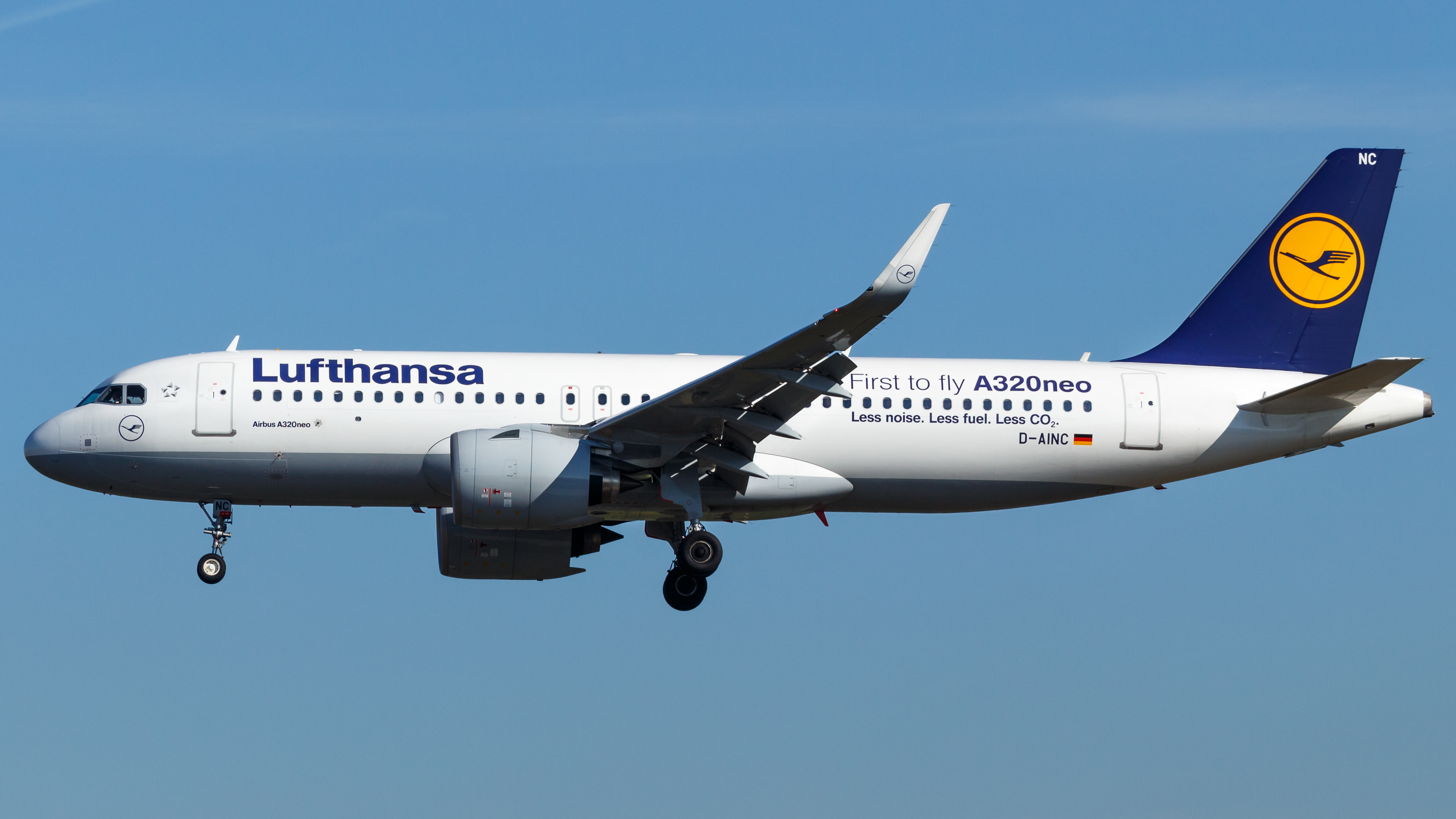
Lufthansa was the first to fly the A320neo in early 2016.

The first A320neo rolled out of the Airbus factory in Toulouse on 1 July 2014. It first flew on 25 September 2014. A joint type certification from EASA and the FAA was received on 24 November 2015.

Nearly 28 years after the first A320, on 25 January 2016, the A320neo entered service with Lufthansa, the type's launch customer. It has a range of 6,300 km (3,400 nmi; 3,900 mi).

==== Reliability ====
Six months later at Farnborough Airshow, John Leahy reported that the eight in-service aircraft had achieved 99.7% dispatch reliability. By the end of February 2017, 28,105 scheduled flights had been performed by 71 A320neo aircraft with 134 cancellations for a 99.5% completion rate. Spirit Airlines reported PW1000G engine issues on four of its A320neos and did not fly them above 30,000 ft (9,100 m) because the bleed air system froze shut on occasion due to cold temperatures; the same problem was reported by IndiGo.

==== Efficiency ====
After a year in service, Lufthansa confirmed the 20% efficiency gain per passenger with up to 180 seats, along with reduced noise and CO_{2} emissions. Operators confirm the 15% per seat fuel-burn savings even counterbalanced by the added weight on short sectors, which can rise to 16–17% on longer routes and to 20% or more for Lufthansa with 180 passengers up from 168 with two more seat rows.

==== Deliveries ====
By March 2017, 88 A320neos had been delivered to 20 airlines, 49 with the PW1000G and 39 with the CFM LEAP-1A, and the fleet had accumulated more than 57,600 flight hours and 37,500 cycles (1.5 h average); over 142 routes the average stage length is 900 nmi (1,700 km; 1,000 mi) and like the A320ceo the neo flies an average of 8.4 block hours and up to 10 cycles a day with Lufthansa operating 45 min sectors from Frankfurt to Hamburg or Munich, up to China Southern Airlines flying close to 6 hr sectors. Airbus planned to deliver about 200 A320neos in 2017. In 2018, new A320neos have a $49 million value, rising by 1–2% per year, and are leased for $330,000–350,000 per month (0.67–0.71%) due to intense lessor competition and low financing costs, while a recent A320ceo is leased for $300,000. In 2018, an A320neo list price was US$110.6 million.

=== A321neo ===
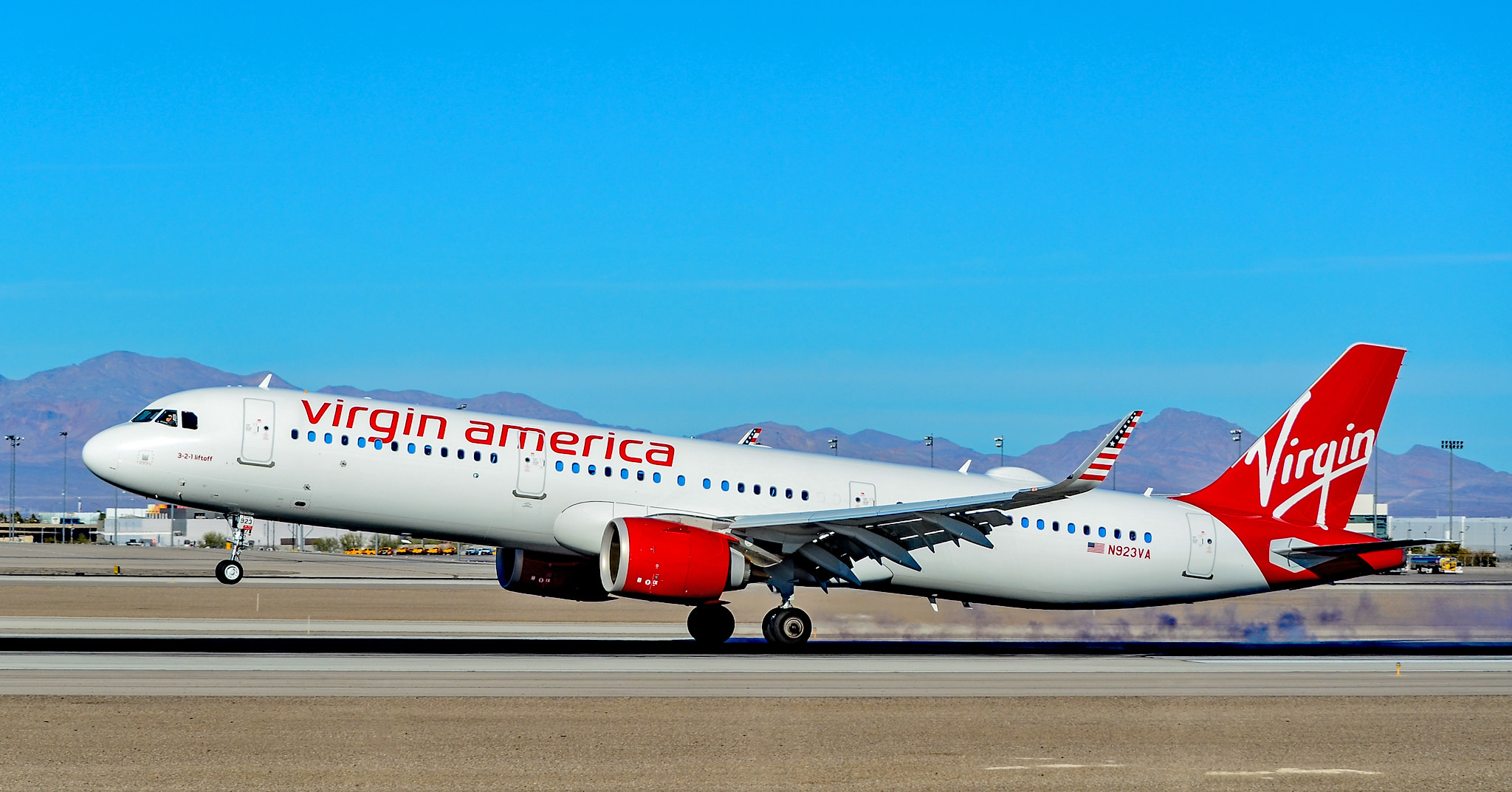
Virgin America received the first A321neo and put it into service in May 2017.

The A321neo has the same length as the original A321ceo, but includes structural strengthening in the landing gear and wing, increased wing loading and other minor modifications due to a higher Maximum Takeoff Weight (MTOW).

Its first customer was ILFC. The Airbus A321neo prototype, D-AVXB, first flew on 9 February 2016. It suffered a tailstrike three days later and was flown to Toulouse for repairs, delaying the certification programme for several weeks.

It received its type certification with Pratt & Whitney engines on 15 December 2016, and simultaneous EASA and FAA certification for the CFM Leap powered variant on 1 March 2017. The first A321neo, leased by GECAS, was delivered in Hamburg to Virgin America, configured with 184 seats and LEAP engines, and entered service in May 2017.

==== A321LR ====
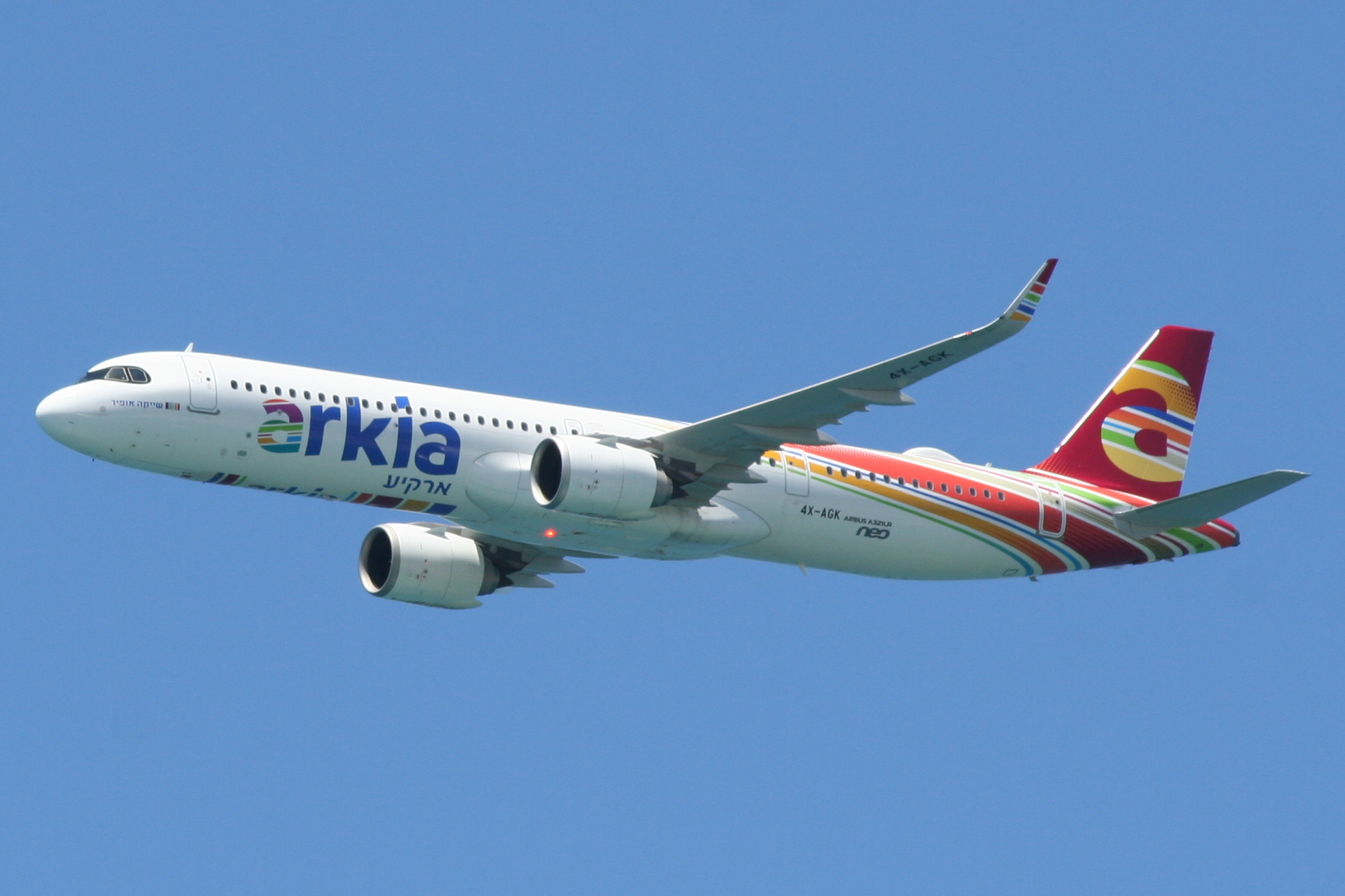
Arkia received the first A321LR on 13 November 2018.

In October 2014, Airbus started marketing a longer range 97 t (214,000 lb) maximum takeoff weight variant with three auxiliary fuel tanks, giving it 100 nmi (190 km; 120 mi) more operational range than a Boeing 757-200. Airbus launched the A321LR (Long Range) on 13 January 2015; it has a range of 4,000 nmi (7,400 km; 4,600 mi) with 206 seats in two classes. On 31 January 2018, the variant completed its first flight. Airbus announced its certification on 2 October 2018. On 13 November 2018, Arkia received the first A321LR.

==== A321XLR ====
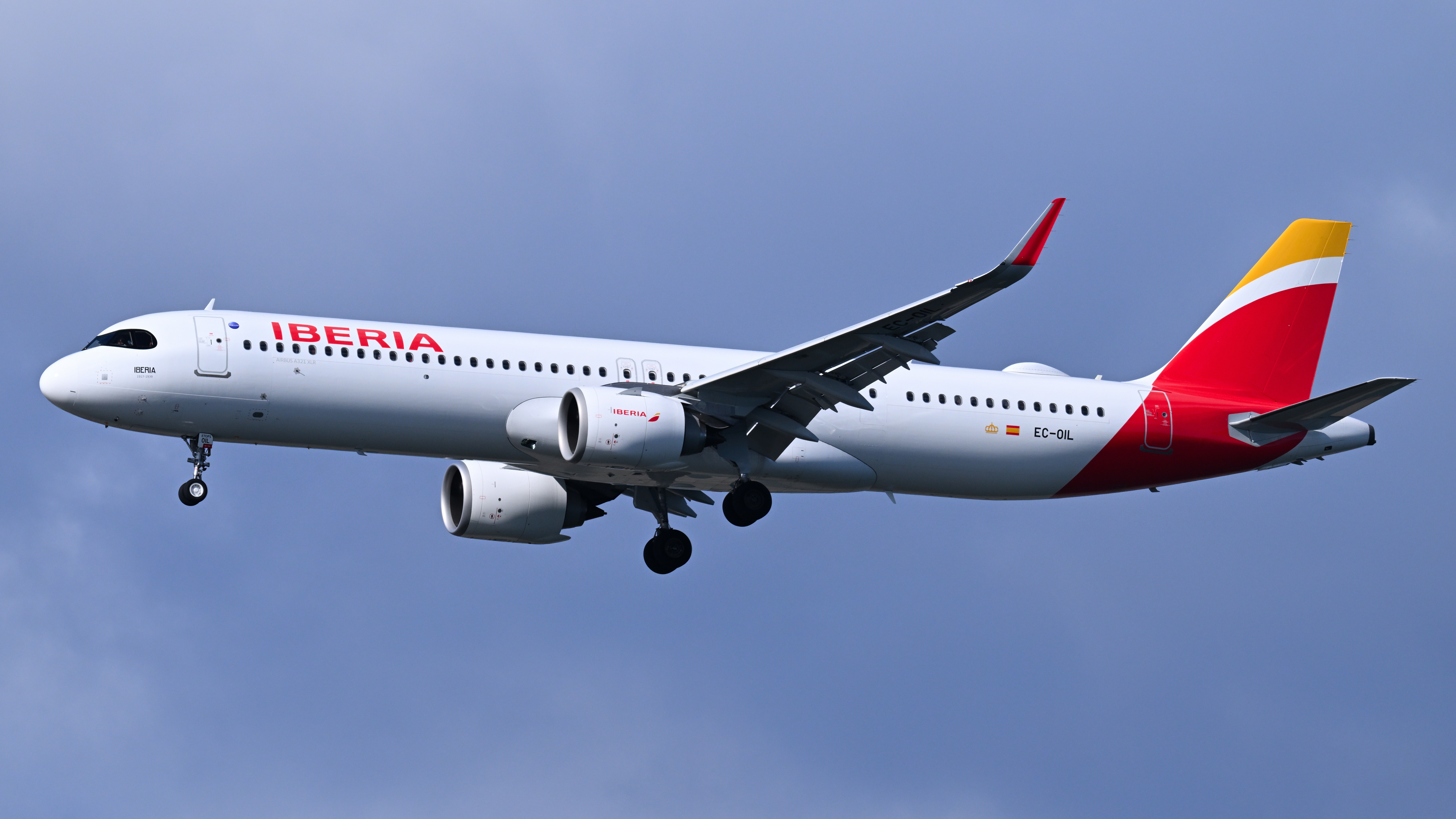
Iberia was the launch customer of the A321XLR.

In January 2018, Airbus was studying an A321LR variant with a further increased MTOW. The proposed A321XLR, with an increased range of 4,500 nmi (8,300 km; 5,200 mi), was to be launched in 2019 to enter service in 2021 or 2022 and compete with the Boeing NMA. In November, Airbus indicated that the A321XLR would have an MTOW over 100 t (220,000 lb) and 700 nmi (1,300 km; 810 mi) more range than the A321LR. The A321XLR was launched at the June 2019 Paris Air Show, with 4,700 nmi (8,700 km; 5,400 mi) of range from 2023, including a new permanent Rear Centre Tank (RCT) for more fuel, a strengthened landing gear for a 101 t (223,000 lb) MTOW; and an optimised wing trailing-edge flap configuration to preserve take-off performance. The company announced in June 2022 that the aircraft had completed its first flight. The A321XLR, powered by CFM LEAP-1A engines, received EASA type certification on 19 July 2024 and was expected to enter service at the end of the summer, while certification of the PW1000G engine powered A321XLR, was expected to follow later in the same year.

=== Airbus Corporate Jets ===
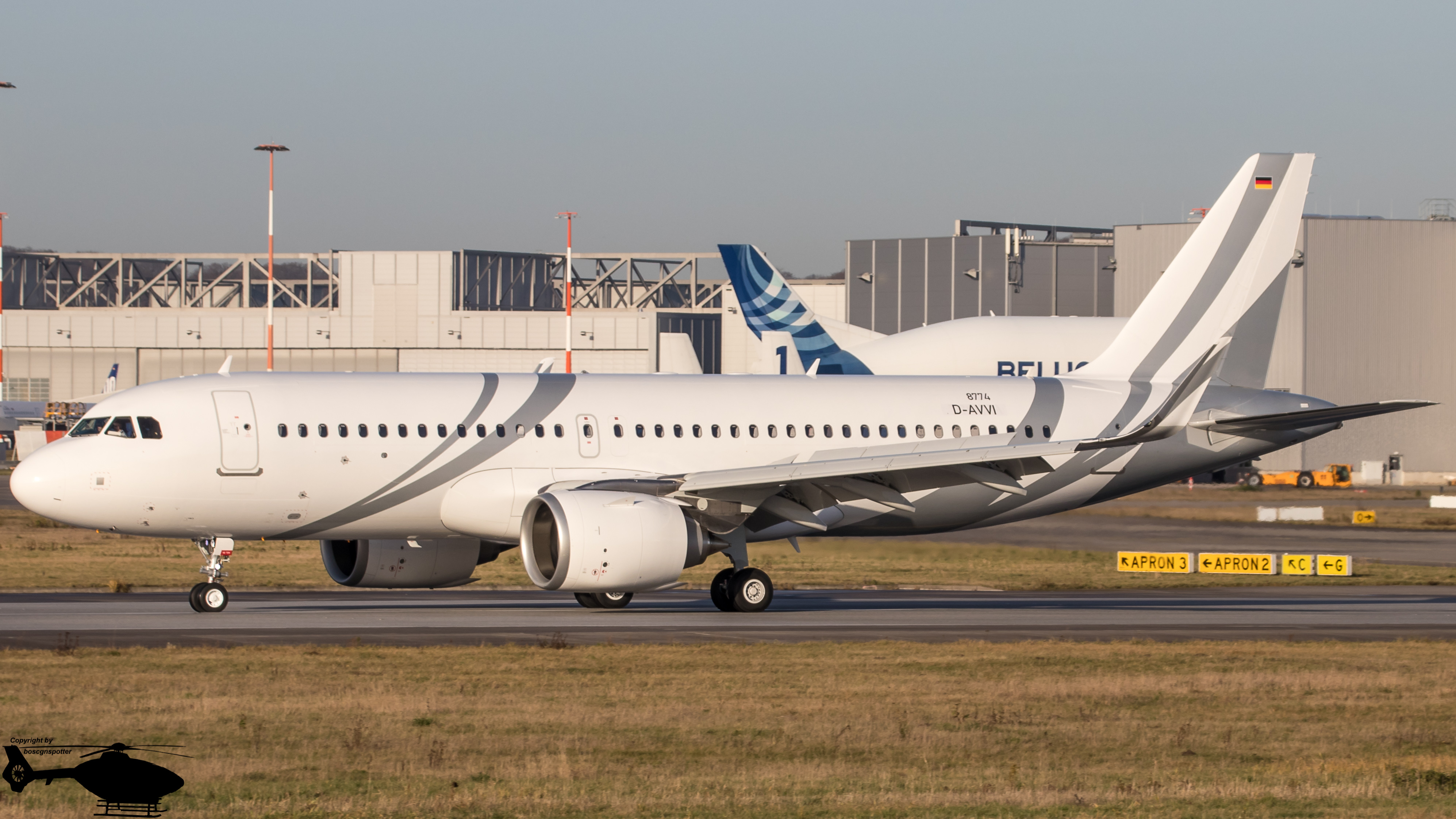
ACJ320neo Corporate Jet at Hamburg Finkenwerder after performing its first flight

Two Airbus Corporate Jets variants are offered: the ACJ319neo, carrying eight passengers up to 6,750 nmi (12,500 km; 7,770 mi), and the ACJ320neo, carrying 25 up to 6,000 nmi (11,000 km; 6,900 mi). The CFM LEAP or Pratt & Whitney PW1100G lower fuel-burn provides additional range along with lower engine noise while the cabin altitude does not exceed 6,400 ft (2,000 m). To increase its fuel capacity, the ACJ319neo is offered with up to five additional centre tanks (ACT).

The first ACJ320neo was delivered in January 2019, with deliveries of the ACJ319neo expected to start a few months later. On 25 April 2019, the ACJ319neo, outfitted with five ACTs, completed its first flight, before a short test campaign and subsequent delivery to German K5 Aviation. The following day, the aircraft completed an endurance test flight lasting 16 hours and 10 minutes and setting a record for the longest A320-family flight by an Airbus crew.

=== Military variants ===
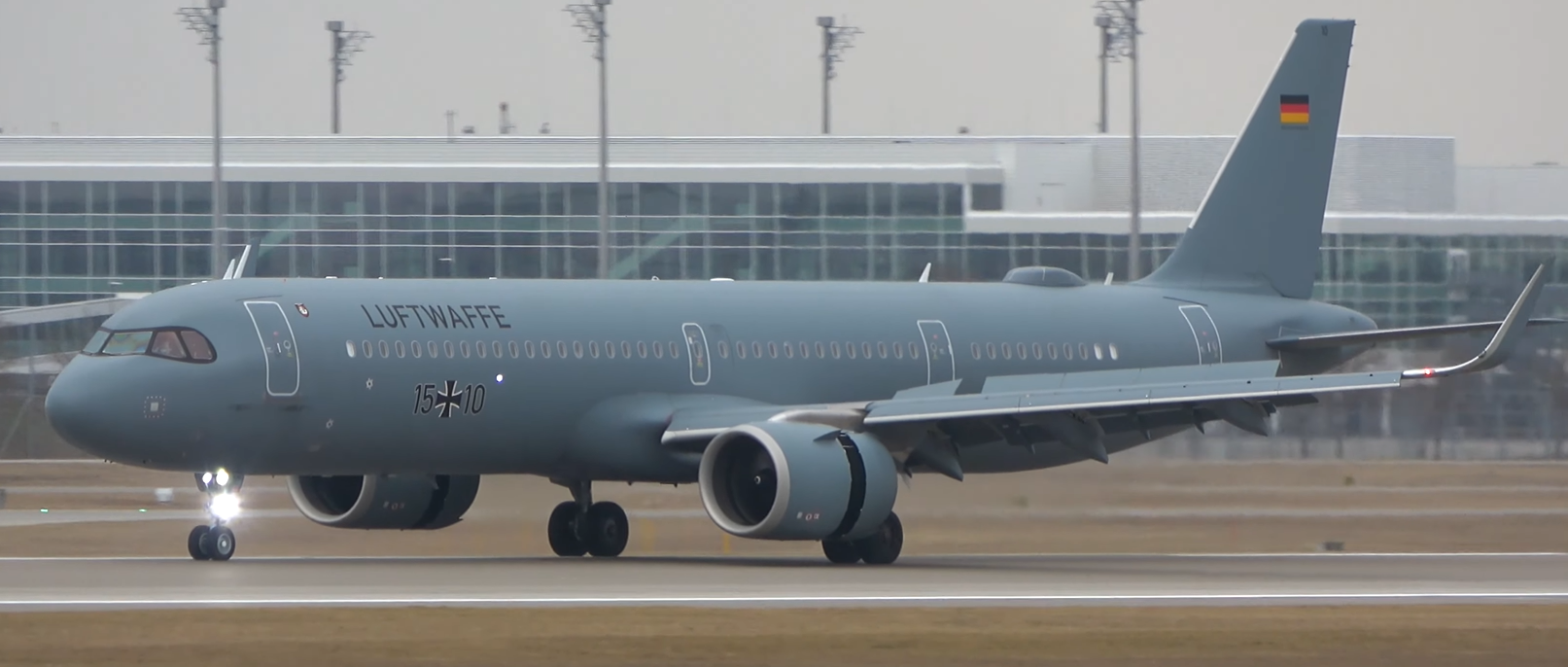
A321LR of the German Air Force

==== A321LR – Transport and MEDEVAC ====
The German Air Force operates two A321LR based on the A321neo; they are used for medical evacuation missions and can be configured for passenger transport.

==== A320neo – Modular Multi-Mission Aircraft (M3A) ====
In July 2018, Airbus unveiled the concept of a Modular Multi-Mission Aircraft (M3A) family of aircraft. This family includes the following variants:

- Maritime Patrol Aircraft (MPA) and anti-submarine warfare
- Airborne Early Warning and Control (AEW&C)
- Signal Intelligence (SIGINT)
- VIP military transport

So far this family of aircraft hasn't been selected by any military.

==== A321neo – Maritime Patrol Aircraft (MPA) ====
In November 2024, Airbus revealed the A321 MPA aircraft, a proposed successor to the Atlantique 2 of the French Navy. The variant offered by Airbus is the A321XLR. The aircraft is in competition with a Falcon 10X offered by Dassault.

Equipment:

- 2 × dorsal fairings (SATCOM)
- 5 × blade antennas
- 1 × E/O gimball under the cockpit
- MAWS (Missile Approach Warning Systems)
- ESM (Electronic Support Measures)
- Tail cone, a bay for the weapons and the sonobuoys

== Operators ==
As of October 2026, 4,822 A320neo family aircraft are in service with 127 operators, 85 of which use CFM engines, and 42 PW engines. The five largest operators are IndiGo operating 380, Wizz Air 216, China Southern Airlines 190, China Eastern Airlines 169 and Frontier Airlines 144 aircraft.

=== Orders and deliveries ===
At the A320neo programme launch on 1 December 2010, Airbus anticipated "a market potential of 4,000 A320neo Family aircraft over the next 15 years". The six month head-start of the A320neo allowed Airbus to rack up 1,000 orders before Boeing announced the MAX. In less than a year, by the November 2011 Dubai Airshow, the family had reached 1,420 orders and commitments, making it the "fastest selling aircraft ever". By March 2013, a little over two years after launch, It had received 2,000 orders. At the first jet delivery in January 2016, the family had received almost 4,500 orders from nearly 80 customers. As of May 2017 it had 5,052 orders : 49 A319neos (1%), 3,617 A320neos (72%) and 1,386 A321neos (27%), with 1,712 of them powered by CFM LEAPs (34%), 1,429 by PW GTFs (28%) and 1,911 undisclosed (38%). By 2019, the A320neo had a 60% market share against the competing Boeing 737 MAX. By December 2021, as many orders migrated to the larger A321neo, it became the most popular variant with 3,958 orders compared to 3,748 orders for the A320neo, while the previous A321 achieved a third of the A320 family orders. In June 2023, total orders for the A321neo reached 5,163, surpassing total orders for the A320ceo of 4,763, and making it the most-ordered variant of the A320 family. In July 2023 the total orders reached 5,259, surpassing the record 5,205 orders for the Boeing 737-800, becoming the most ordered variant of any airliner in the world. In December 2023, the A320neo family became the first airliner generation to reach a record order of 10,000 units and an order backlog of 7,000 units.

As of October 2026, a total of 12,492 A320neo family aircraft have been ordered by 130 customers, of which 4,855 aircraft have been delivered.

Orders and deliveries by type (summary)
Type	Orders	Deliveries	Backlog
A319neo	58	46	12
A320neo	4,417	2,507	1,910
A321neo	8,017	2,302	5,715
A320neo family	12,492	4,855	7,637

A320neo family orders and deliveries by year (distributive)
		2010	2011	2012	2013	2014	2015	2016	2017	2018	2019
Orders	A319neo	–	26	19	–	2	1	5	−22	22	−18
Orders	A320neo	30	1,081	378	387	824	540	269	416	149	−295
Orders	A321neo	14	119	81	341	183	346	287	532	360	965
Orders	A320neo family	44	1,226	478	728	1,009	887	561	926	531	652
Deliveries	A319neo	–	–	–	–	–	–	–	–	–	2
Deliveries	A320neo	–	–	–	–	–	–	68	161	284	381
Deliveries	A321neo	–	–	–	–	–	–	–	20	102	168
Deliveries	A320neo family	–	–	–	–	–	–	68	181	386	561

		2020	2021	2022	2023	2024	2025	2026	Total
Orders	A319neo	7	2	15	1	−4	–	1	58
Orders	A320neo	−305	−84	330	402	−39	69	293	4,417
Orders	A321neo	561	526	425	1,286	658	491	669	8,017
Orders	A320neo family	263	444	770	1,689	615	560	963	12,492
Deliveries	A319neo	–	2	6	7	9	15	5	46
Deliveries	A320neo	253	258	246	247	232	205	172	2,507
Deliveries	A321neo	178	199	264	317	361	387	306	2,302
Deliveries	A320neo family	431	459	516	571	602	607	483	4,855

A320neo family orders and deliveries by year (cumulative)

Orders
Deliveries

Data as of October 2026

2011

In early January 2011, IndiGo reached a memorandum of understanding (MoU) for 150 A320neos along 30 A320ceos. On 17 January, Virgin America became the launch customer, ordering 60 A320s including 30 A320neos.

At the June 2011 Paris Air Show, it gathered 667 commitments worth US$60.9 billion, raising the backlog to 1,029. Malaysian low-cost carrier AirAsia ordered 200, the largest commercial aviation order at the time. IndiGo confirmed its 150 order. Airbus received orders from GECAS, Scandinavian Airlines, TransAsia Airways, IndiGo, LAN Airlines, AirAsia, GoAir, Air Lease Corporation and Avianca.

On 20 July 2011, American Airlines announced an order for 460 narrowbody jets including 130 A320ceos and 130 A320neos, and intended to order 100 re-engined 737 with CFM LEAPs, pending Boeing confirmation. The order broke Boeing's monopoly with the airline and forced Boeing into the re-engined 737 MAX. As this sale included a Most-Favoured-Customer Clause, the European airframer must refund any price difference to American if it sells to another airline at a lower price. As a result, Airbus was unable to offer the A320neo at a price which United Airlines deemed "competitive", leaving it with a Boeing-skewed fleet.

On 27 July 2011, Lufthansa ordered 25 A320neos and 5 A321neos. The November Dubai Airshow saw a further 130 orders, raising the total to 1,420 orders and commitments, making it the fastest selling aircraft ever.

2012

On 25 January, Norwegian and Airbus confirmed an order of 100 A320neos. In November, Virgin America deferred the deliveries of the A320neo aircraft until 2020, making ILFC the new launch customer along with the A321neo. In December 2012 Pegasus Airlines, the second largest airline in Turkey, signed a deal for up to 100 A320neo family aircraft, of which 75 (57 A320neo and 18 A321neo models) are firm orders.

2013

Lufthansa ordered an additional 70 A320neo and A321neo aircraft on 14 March 2013. easyJet, who already operates 195 A320ceo family aircraft, intends to acquire 100 Airbus A320neo for delivery between 2017 and 2022. As part of the deal, easyJet have options on a further 100 A320neo aircraft, and the Japanese carrier ANA is to order the A320neo and A321neo. Lion Air ordered 183. On 15 March 2013, Turkish Airlines ordered 82 A320s with 35 options including four A320neo and 53 A321neo.

2014

On 15 October 2014 IndiGo signed a MoU with Airbus for purchasing 250 A320neo family aircraft. The deal would be worth over $25.5 billion as per the list price per aircraft. This order will also be the largest by the airline, marking the largest number of jets ever sold by the European planemaker in a single order. The airline had earlier ordered 100 aircraft in 2005 and another 180 aircraft in 2011.

2017

On 15 November 2017 Airbus announced the signing of a MoU with Indigo Partners' four portfolio airlines for 430 A320neo family aircraft – a deal worth nearly $50 billion. On 14 December 2017 Delta Air Lines announced an order for 100 A321neo aircraft and 100 options, powered by Pratt & Whitney PW1100Gs.

2018

By September 2018, Airbus should deliver 3,174 A320neos compared with 2,999 Boeing 737 MAX through 2022. A320neo-family maintenance should rise from $650 million in 2018 to $3.3 billion in 2022.

2019

On 29 October 2019, IndiGo placed a firm order for 300 A320neo Family aircraft, marking one of Airbus' largest aircraft orders ever with a single airline operator. The order comprised a mix of A320neo, A321neo and A321XLR aircraft. This takes IndiGo's total number of A320neo Family aircraft orders to 730.

On 18 November 2019, the low-cost carrier Air Arabia ordered 120 A320neo family jets worth $14 billion at list prices: 70 A320neos and 50 A321neos/XLRs, to be delivered from 2024.

2022

On 1 July 2022, four Chinese airlines ordered 292 A320neo aircraft. China Eastern ordered 100, China Southern ordered 96 and signed lease agreements for 17 more, Air China ordered 64 and Shenzhen Airlines ordered 32.

2023

On 14 February 2023, Air India placed an order for 470 aircraft, the largest order at that time, comprising 140 A320neos, 70 A321neos and other airliners.

On 19 June 2023, IndiGo placed an order for 500 A320neo family aircraft, surpassing Air India's order four months earlier and becoming the largest aircraft order by volume with 125 A320neos and 375 A321neos.

== Accidents and incidents ==
The A320neo family has recorded one airport-safety related hull-loss accident with no fatalities onboard and three fatalities on the ground as of June 2024.

As of 2023, the A320neo family had experienced 0.11 fatal hull loss accidents for every million takeoffs and 0.11 total hull loss accidents for every million takeoffs.

=== Accidents ===
On 2 September 2022, TAP Air Portugal Flight 1492, an Airbus A320neo registered as CS-TVI, from Lisbon to Conakry International Airport hit a motorbike during landing. Both occupants of the motorbike were killed and the aircraft received damage to its right engine. One rider of the motorbike was identified as the airport's security guard.

On 18 November 2022, LATAM Perú Flight 2213, an Airbus A320neo registered as CC-BHB, collided with a fire engine that was crossing the runway during takeoff from Lima, killing two firefighters and injuring a third, who died several months later. All 102 passengers and 6 crew aboard escaped, but 40 of them were injured, 4 of them seriously. The aircraft was written off.

== Specifications ==
Airbus family figures
Variant	A319neo	A320neo	A321neo
Cockpit crew	Two		
2-class seats	140	165	206: 16 J @ 36 in (91 cm) + 190 Y @ 30 in (76 cm)
1-class maximum	160	195 @ 27 in (69 cm)	244 @ 28 in (71 cm)
Seat width	Economy at 6 abreast: 18 in (46 cm), 3.7 m (12 ft 2 in) cabin width, Business at 4 abreast		
Cargo capacity	27 m^{3} (950 cu ft)	37 m^{3} (1,300 cu ft)	51 m^{3} (1,800 cu ft) (Note: no Additional Centre Tank (ACT))
Length	33.84 m (111 ft)	37.57 m (123 ft 3 in)	44.51 m (146 ft)
Wingspan	35.80 m (117 ft 5 in)		
Height	11.76 m (38 ft 7 in)		
Max. takeoff weight	75.5 t (166,400 lb)	79 t (174,200 lb)	97 t (213,800 lb) (Note: A321LR with 3 ACT, A321neo: 93.5 t (206,000 lb) and 3,650 nautical miles (6,760 km; 4,200 mi) range with 2 ACT) (Note: A321XLR: 101 t (223,000 lb) MTOW, 4,700 nmi (5,400 mi; 8,700 km) range)
Max. payload	17.7 t (39,000 lb)	20 t (44,100 lb)	25.5 t (56,200 lb)
Operating empty	42.6 t (93,900 lb)	44.3 t (97,700 lb)	50.1 t (110,500 lb)
Minimum weight (Note: GTF/LEAP)		40.3–40.6 t (89,000–90,000 lb)	46.3–46.6 t (102,000–103,000 lb)
Fuel capacity	29,659 L (7,835 US gal) (Note: with 2 Additional Centre Tanks, no ACT: 23,859 L (6,303 US gal))		32,853 L (8,679 US gal) (Note: A321LR with 3 Additional Centre Tanks, no ACT: 23,490 L (6,205 US gal), A321XLR: additional 12,900 L (2,800 imp gal; 3,400 US gal) Rear Centre Tank (RCT) + optional 3,121 L (687 imp gal; 824 US gal) forward ACT: total 39,511 L (8,691 imp gal; 10,438 US gal) maximum)
Engines (×2)	CFM International LEAP-1A or Pratt & Whitney PW1100G		
Fan diameter	PW1100G: 81 in (206 cm), LEAP-1A: 78 in (198 cm)		
Max. thrust	107 kN (24,100 lbf)	120.6 kN (27,120 lbf)	147.3 kN (33,110 lbf)
Speed	Cruise: Mach 0.78 (518 mph; 450 kn; 833 km/h), Max.: Mach 0.82 (544 mph; 473 kn; 876 km/h)		
Ceiling	39,100–39,800 ft (11,900–12,100 m)		
Typical range	6,950 km (3,750 nmi; 4,320 mi) (Note: with 140 passengers, with 124: 7,750 km (4,200 nmi; 4,800 mi))	6,500 km (3,500 nmi; 4,000 mi) (Note: with 165 passengers, with 150: 6,850 km (3,700 nmi; 4,300 mi))	7,400 km (4,000 nmi; 4,600 mi) (Note: with 206 passengers)
Takeoff	1,829 m (6,000 ft)	1,951 m (6,400 ft)	1,988 m (6,522 ft)
ICAO type	A19N	A20N	A21N

=== Engines ===
Type certificate
Designation	Engines	Certification	Take-off thrust	Maximum continuous
A319-171N	PW1124G1-JM	19 August 2019	107.82 kN (24,240 lbf)	106.91 kN (24,030 lbf)
A319-151N	CFM LEAP-1A24	19 August 2019	106.80 kN (24,010 lbf)	106.76 kN (24,000 lbf)
A319-153N	CFM LEAP-1A26	19 August 2019	120.64 kN (27,120 lbf)	118.68 kN (26,680 lbf)
A320-271N	PW1127G-JM	24 November 2015	120.43 kN (27,070 lbf)	117.18 kN (26,340 lbf)
A320-272N	PW1124G1-JM	19 August 2019	107.82 kN (24,240 lbf)	106.91 kN (24,030 lbf)
A320-273N	PW1129G-JM	19 August 2019	130.00 kN (29,230 lbf)	117.19 kN (26,350 lbf)
A320-251N	CFM LEAP-1A26	31 May 2016	120.64 kN (27,120 lbf)	118.68 kN (26,680 lbf)
A320-252N	CFM LEAP-1A24	17 January 2018	106.80 kN (24,010 lbf)	106.76 kN (24,000 lbf)
A320-253N	CFM LEAP-1A29	19 August 2019	130.29 kN (29,290 lbf)	118.68 kN (26,680 lbf)
A321-271N	PW1133G-JM	15 December 2016	147.28 kN (33,110 lbf)	145.81 kN (32,780 lbf)
A321-272N	PW1130G-JM	27 June 2017	147.28 kN (33,110 lbf)	145.81 kN (32,780 lbf)
A321-251N	CFM LEAP-1A32	10 July 2018	143.05 kN (32,160 lbf)	140.96 kN (31,690 lbf)
A321-252N	CFM LEAP-1A30	17 January 2018	143.05 kN (32,160 lbf)	140.96 kN (31,690 lbf)
A321-253N	CFM LEAP-1A33	10 July 2017	143.05 kN (32,160 lbf)	140.96 kN (31,690 lbf)

Notes

- A321-25xNX/-27xNX was the A321neo ACF (Airbus Cabin Flex) configuration and the A321LR.
- A321-25xNY/-27xNY was the A321XLR.

== See also ==
- Competition between Airbus and Boeing

Related development

- Airbus A320 family

Aircraft of comparable role, configuration, and era

- Airbus A220-300
- Boeing 737 MAX
- Boeing 757
- Comac C919
- Embraer E-195 E2
- Yakovlev MC-21

Related lists

- List of jet airliners
