= Most-Favoured-Customer Clause =

A Most-Favoured-Customer Clause (MFC) is a contractual arrangement between vendor and customer that guarantees the customer the best price the vendor gives to anyone. The MFC prevents a company from treating different customers differently in negotiations.

For example, on July 20, 2011, American Airlines announced an order for 460 narrowbody jets including 260 Airbus A320s. The order broke Boeing's monopoly with the airline and forced Boeing into the re-engined 737 MAX. As this sale included a "most favoured customer clause", the European airframer has to refund any difference to American Airlines if it sells to another airline at a lower price.

Big box retailers such as Wal-Mart and Costco often use their monopoly power to demand MFC from their suppliers. In one anecdote recalled by Costco CEO Jim Sinegal, a frozen-food supplier to both Wal-Mart and Costco accidentally sent Wal-Mart's invoice to Costco by mistake, and as the invoice revealed that Wal-Mart received lower pricing on the same goods, Costco immediately terminated its relationship with that supplier.

== Evaluation under competition law in EU and US ==
While it may appear that MFCs benefit consumers because prices are lowered, authorities increasingly argue that such clauses prevent the offer of lower prices elsewhere and make the market entry of competitive offers considerably more difficult because they prevent new entrants from offering products at lower prices. It thus prevents competition.
