= Colby (surname) =

Colby is a surname.

== Notable people with the surname "Colby" include ==
=== A ===
- Abram Colby, American slave
- Anita Colby (1914–1972), American actress
- Anthony Colby (1792–1873), American politician

=== B ===
- Bainbridge Colby (1869–1950), American politician
- Barbara Colby (1940–1975), American actress
- Brandon Colby, American physician

=== C ===
- Carlos W. Colby (1837–1922), American soldier
- Casey Colby (born 1974), American ski jumper
- C. B. Colby (1904–1977), American author
- Celestia Rice Colby (1827–1900), American activist
- Charles Carroll Colby (1827–1907), Canadian politician
- Chuck Colby, American electronics engineer
- Clara Bewick Colby (1846–1916), British-American lecturer
- Clara Ellinore Colby (1859-1941), American pianist, soprano, and music educator
- Connor Colby (born 2003), American football player

=== D ===
- Danielle Colby (born 1975), American television personality

=== E ===
- Elbridge Colby
- Eleana Colby, American politician
- Everett Colby (1874–1943), American politician

=== F ===
- Flick Colby (1946–2011), American dancer
- Frank Moore Colby (1865–1925), American educator and writer
- Frederick Myron Colby (1848–1920), American writer

=== G ===
- Gardner Colby (1810–1879), American businessman
- Geoffrey Colby (1901–1958), British colonial administrator
- Gerard Colby (born 1950), American author
- Greg Colby (born 1952), American football coach

=== H ===
- H. Maria George Colby (1844–1910), American journalist

=== J ===
- James Colby (1961–2018), American actor
- Jamie Colby, American television presenter
- John Colby (preacher) (1787–1813), American preacher
- John Colby (musician) (born 1949), American musician
- June Rose Colby (1856–1941), American professor

=== K ===
- Kate Colby (born 1974), American poet
- Kenneth Colby (1920–2001), American psychiatrist
- Kerri Colby (born 1996), American drag performer

=== L ===
- Leonard Wright Colby (1846–1924), American politician

=== M ===
- Maria Colby, English suffragist
- Max Colby (born 1990), American artist
- Michael Colby (born 1951), American lyricist
- Moses French Colby (1795–1863), Canadian doctor

=== R ===
- Robert Colby (1922–1987), American songwriter

=== S ===
- Sarah A. Colby (1824–1904), American physician
- Sasha Colby (born 1985), American drag performer
- Stoddard B. Colby (1816–1867), American lawyer

=== T ===
- Thomas Colby (disambiguation), multiple people

=== V ===
- Vine Colby (1886–1971), American essayist

=== W ===
- William Colby (1920–1996), American intelligence officer
- William Edward Colby (1865–1974), American lawyer and conservationist

== Fictional people ==
- Alexis Colby, a character on the soap operas Dynasty and The Colbys
- Jeff Colby, a character on the soap operas Dynasty and The Colbys
- Liza Colby, a character on the soap opera, All My Children
- Monica Colby, a character on the soap operas Dynasty and The Colbys
- Sable Colby, a character on the soap operas Dynasty and The Colbys

== See also ==
- Colby (disambiguation), a disambiguation page for "Colby"
- Colby (given name), a page for people with the given name "Colby"
- General Colby (disambiguation), a disambiguation page for Generals with the surname "Colby"
- Governor Colby (disambiguation), a disambiguation page for Governors with the surname "Colby"
- Senator Colby (disambiguation), a disambiguation page for Senators with the surname "Colby"
