= AXO =

AXO, axo, or variants may refer to:

- Axo, a fictional character in Hanazuki: Full of Treasures children's web TV series
- Axo (comics), a character in Marvel Comics
- Axo, a place in the Ottoman Empire, whose residents sheltered after the 1909 Adana massacre in Derinkuyu underground city and Kaymakli Underground City
- Axo, a dialect of Cappadocian Greek
- Abandoned explosive ordnance, such as a land mine
- Axo-atmospheric interceptor, or AXO, an Indian military weapon project of DRDO
- AXO, the call sign of an Alexanderson alternator in Warsaw, Poland from 1923
- AXO, Italian motorcycle clothing company, founded in 1978
- Simon Axø, the high school headmaster since 2017 of Testrup Højskole in Testrup, Denmark
- AXO, a Portuguese former neo-nazi group founded by teacher and writer Paulo Borges

== See also ==
- Axon, a nerve fiber
- Alpha Chi Omega (ΑΧΩ), a sorority
- Axiotron, Inc., stock ticker AXO
