= Celestia Rice Colby =

American writer

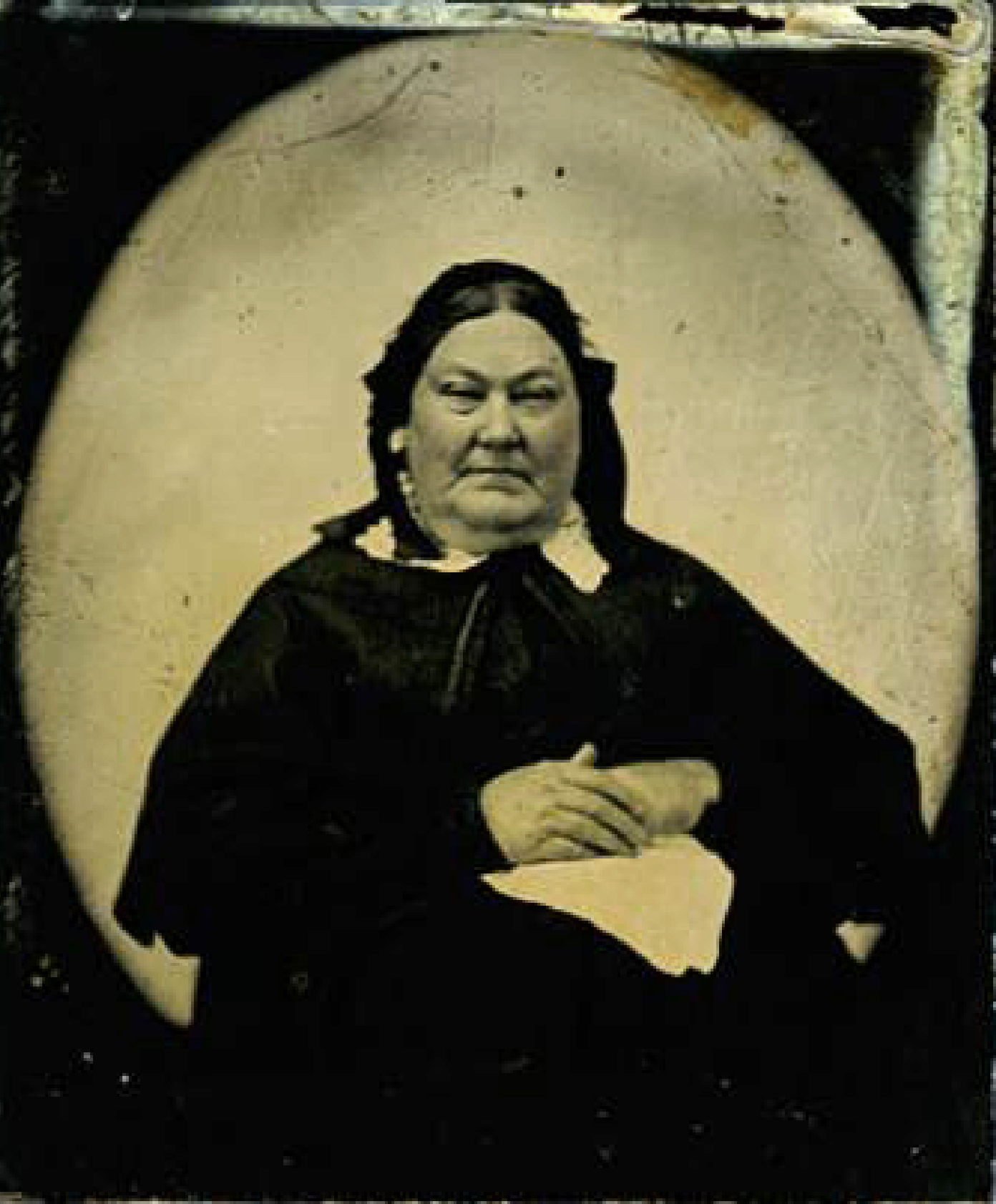
- Born: December 19, 1827; Andover, Ohio
- Died: July 20, 1900 (aged 72); Normal, Illinois
- Occupation: Writer
- Children: June Rose Colby, Vine Cynthia Colby Foster, Branch Harris Colby, Montie Plummer Colby

Celestia Rice Colby was an activist who promoted feminist and anti-slavery ideas through her writing. Reviewing her prose also illuminates the idea of separate spheres that was present in the 19th and 20th centuries.

== Early life ==
Celestia was born on December 19, 1827. Her parents were Joel and Flavia (Bradley) Rice, and they resided in Andover, Ohio. She was the fourth child followed by a younger brother a year and a half later. However, her mother died two months after his birth. Joel then married a woman named Evelina Johnson in November 1830, moving the whole family to Cherry Valley, Ohio two years later.

This move accumulated great wealth for the Rice family, as Joel owned a dairy farm and a local business. They were considered one of the richest families in Cherry Valley, which was a growing community. Celestia gained three step siblings born to Joel and Evelina.

Per Celestia's diary entries, she was unhappy in her childhood and did not share a pleasant relationship with Evelina, contributing to her little writing about her step siblings. She grieved her mother and thus did not adjust well to these changes.

However, education was her primary outlet for happiness. In her writing, she remarked that “’Some of the dearest memories of the past are linked with that spot, and the strongest ties of friendship which have blessed my path … were there bound in the sunny days of girlhood.’” She first attended a common school in Cherry Valley, but then pursued further education at Grand River Institute, a private seminary school, in Austinburg, Ohio. Achieving such levels of schooling was very rare for girls during the early 1840s, and Celestia arrived only soon after they permitted girls to attend the school. This was also especially rare considering their rural location and lifestyle. For instance, Andover, her hometown, was a town of “just over 600 residents.” The GRI offered the same courseload to both male and female students and assured those students held proper morals and sufficient intellect.

Although it is unknown how long Celestia attended the school, it was recorded that she taught in the area within the same decade after her time there.

== Personal life ==
Celestia would stop teaching in the summer of 1847 as she was then engaged to Lewis Colby, who was a longtime friend. The two were married the following year in July. Celestia noted in her personal writings that she was unsatisfied with her marriage as a result of having to forego her independence (i.e., working) to spend her time as a housewife, while Lewis travelled away from home for his job.

They bored their first child in April 1850, Montie Plummer Colby (a.k.a, “Plummer”). The next child was born in September 1852, by the name of Vine Cynthia Colby. Despite Plummer's good health, he died unexpectedly in November of the following year. This was also concurrent with Celestia's third pregnancy, who came to be Branch Harris Colby, born in July 1854. Her last daughter was born in June 1856, named June Rose Colby. Celestia birthed her fifth and final child in an undocumented year, but he was stillborn. His name was alleged to be Thorn.

Despite all the tragedy and dissatisfaction in Celestia's life, she maintained happiness through her children. She ensured that her children were properly educated, particularly with June Rose, as she wanted them to positively contribute to society. Her surviving children were all successful, as Vine became a doctor, Branch worked for the St. Louis Sewer Department, and June was a prominent faculty member at Illinois State Normal University. All three of them also attended college at the University of Michigan.

The family often moved around as a result of Lewis's job prospects. For instance, they moved to Freeport, Illinois, in 1866. He had transitioned from agriculture to sales. Their next move was to Ann Arbor, Michigan in 1890 for their children's attendance at the university. Once they all graduated and moved to different areas in the Midwest, Celestia and Lewis did the same, eventually separating themselves at some point between 1881 and 1883. It is unknown whether they officially divorced, however.

During her time with Lewis, in addition to domestic work, she was preoccupied with labor on the farm. The combination of these duties negatively impacted her happiness as she desired a different way of life, on top of her general unhappiness with Lewis. In one of her articles, “Rainy Days,” published for The Dollar Newspaper in Philadelphia, she characterized male farmers as lazy, and that they should use their free time to learn as opposed to visiting taverns or sleeping. This piece was certainly inspired by her observations of Lewis and the disdain she felt for being forced into farm labor.

Celestia eventually moved in with June to Normal, Illinois in the 1890s. Upon her arrival, the all-female Normal History Club was formed, where she found joy in discussing ideas with other women. Thankfully, this was not her only form of fulfillment in regard to interacting with like-minded women, as she was known to form bonds with other women in the later 1850s to discuss ideas and garner inspiration as well. One person who contributed to this was her sister-in-law, Annie Colby. Despite their different circumstances, their views brought them together. However, their bond was only temporary as Annie eventually moved to Illinois.

== Writing and activism ==
Amidst her family life and unsatisfactory marriage, Celestia heavily relied on her writing for fulfillment, which was ultimately the main contribution to her legacy. Her diary entries ranged to about six hundred pages, likely more. Additionally, her published works constituted over two hundred essays and stories. Her writing permitted her to explore her “inner self” that she was not afforded in the “real world,” as she wrote “'I am a strange incomprehensible being, and live in a hidden world. My outward and inner life are not the same, they have no points of resemblance. Like two vast continents, they are separated by an ocean of mystery.'” This was a recurring theme in her diaries, describing her discontent as a housewife and farm laborer, when her aspirations rested elsewhere.

Beyond her personal diaries, her publishing allowed her to openly express her social justice alignments, particularly regarding temperance and abolition. She was exposed to the American Anti-Slavery Society in the late 1850s upon their tour of northeast Ohio, which inspired her writing and allowed her to communicate with like-minded activists. Her women's rights inspirations, in part, were also fueled by the visits of Lydia Maria Child and Lucy Coleman to Ashtabula County in 1857, as mentioned in her diary.

Celestia's first published writing was her essay entitled “Flowers,” which was distributed by the Ladies’ Repository. This occurred shortly after the birth of Plummer, so thus her writing endeavors and passions were put on hold.

The Anti-Slavery Bugle published one of her works in January 1858, with arguably radical undertones. In this work, she essentially condemned both the North and South for their inaction and advocated for immediate abolition. While this was a publishing focused on abolition, they also included Celestia's writing about women's rights and against the “separate spheres.”

She was also consistently writing in various journals related to temperance and abolition. One journal in particular was The Woman’s Journal, organized by her old classmate Lucy Stone, who was a woman's suffragist. Celestia's pieces on abolition mainly focused on the idea of universal human equality, while her work regarding temperance emphasized the dangers of alcohol in the home. While her ideas were considered progressive, she still upheld society's expectations for women, in that she brought many of her ideas back to the traditional family. However, in terms of women's rights, she also expressed thoughts about universal equality and rejected the stereotype of women's subordinance to men, both in a physical and intellectual sense. In one journal, The Mayflower, she proposed an unfinished essay where she indicated that women did not simply seek change in legislation, but also change in the way they were treated in everyday life.

Not only did Celestia write for various journals, but she also helped produce one. This journal was called The Ladies Volunteer. In one article dated from 1862, she compared the oppression of women to “bondage,” which was a common sentiment among white, female abolitionists as an attempt to combine the two movements.

Celestia's unfulfilling day-to-day life eventually caused a period of hopelessness in her writing. Rather than her typical, somewhat paradoxical optimism for change demonstrated in her work, she shifted to a more lamenting approach. For instance, in 1863, The Mayflower published a few of her works that grieved lost loved ones, such as Plummer and Annie. The arrival of the Civil War was one of the main causes for this shift in mood.

While Celestia also published children's stories and poems throughout her writing career, around this same time she changed her messaging in those as well. Little Pilgrim was a children's publishing for which she wrote, where she told young girls they did not have to live up to society's expectations and they could achieve their dreams. However, the same year as her sentimental essays in The Mayflower, she instead created nostalgic stories that were fixed on the past, instead of looking toward a brighter future.

Once again, her writing conflicted with the life she led in the physical world. While she advocated for a society in which she would be able to pursue her dreams freely and without the constraints of domesticity, she nevertheless adhered to those standards. Her work inspired future feminists and activists to push beyond societally accepted efforts.

== Death ==
She died from illness in Normal on July 28, 1900. Her death occurred in the home she shared with June. Celestia's grave is located at the Evergreen Memorial Cemetery in Bloomington, Illinois, same as June. A collection of her writing is preserved in the Dr. Jo Ann Rayfield Archives at Illinois State University.
