= Macintosh conversion =

Aftermarket modification of a genuine Apple Mac computer

To date, two methods have been used to make a personal computer, not offered by Apple, but able to run a Mac operating system: either create a Macintosh conversion or build a Macintosh clone.

Unlike Mac clones that contain little or no original Apple hardware, Mac conversions are essentially modification kits that require the core components of a previously purchased, genuine Apple Mac computer, such as the Macintosh ROM or the motherboard, in order to become a functional computer system.

This places the commercial production of a Mac conversion under the protection of the first-sale doctrine in the U.S. and similar legal concepts in most other countries.

== Background ==
Since the early days of Macintosh computers, manufacturers have sought to fulfill the needs of customers who wanted to have a computer with Mac OS, but with a functionality not provided by Apple’s existing Macintosh (later called Mac) lineup. Companies making Mac conversions start with a previously purchased, genuine Apple Mac computer, and use them in combination with their own manufactured components to assemble their custom Mac solution. Modifications can be as minor as the addition of a touch-sensitive display bezel to an otherwise factory standard iMac to create for example a kiosk system, or as extensive as the complete replacement of a MacBook's laptop enclosure to create a Tablet Mac.

While this business model of aftermarket modification is most commonly used in the car industry, with one of the most famous examples being the Shelby Mustang, a high performance variant of the Ford Mustang, it has been applied with equal success in the Mac market.

Whereas Mac clones typically aim to compete directly with Apple's solutions through lower prices, commercial Mac conversions rely on offering features/solutions not available from Apple, and where the need for that particular Mac solution is high enough to justify the combined cost of the full price of the Mac donor computer plus the price of the conversion kit and labor. Commercially successful Mac conversions were discontinued when Apple introduced products with competing features.

== Legality ==
By definition, a Macintosh conversion is an aftermarket modification of a previously purchased, genuine Apple Mac computer or laptop, while preserving the core components required to run the Mac operating system, such as the donor Mac's motherboard. Conversions are thus completely compatible with Macintosh software, and avoid any of the copyright misuse, DMCA or Mac operating system licensing issues that form the basis of the legal threat unlicensed Mac clone manufacturers have to face.

Apple's 1986 agreement to sell Macintosh computers to Dynamac at a discounted price indicated the former's tolerance of the latter company's conversions. Other companies stated that they were also negotiating with Apple, but would continue to purchase Macs at retail for conversion without such an agreement. Apple only sold complete computers for conversion, refusing to sell individual components such as motherboards despite conversion vendors' wishes, although inviting them to become value-added resellers. The performance of aftermarket modifications is in the U.S. protected by the First-sale doctrine and similar legal concepts in most other countries. Its legality has been tested through litigation, most notably in the automotive industry, where automobile manufacturers have attempted to hinder or suppress automotive aftermarket businesses by means of copyright and/or patent infringement lawsuits.

The application of the aftermarket process makes for a critical legal distinction between Macintosh conversions and Macintosh clones. Whereas none of the Mac conversions of the companies listed below have seen legal action, Psystar, an unlicensed Mac clone maker, was sued by Apple in federal court within months of the introduction of their first Mac clones.

== Companies ==
The following companies have created commercially available Mac conversion solutions:

=== Axiotron, Inc. ===
Axiotron, Inc., was founded as a Delaware corporation in 2005 with headquarters in Los Angeles, California. It was acquired in 2008 by the publicly traded Toronto, Canada-based Axiotron Corp. (TSX-V: AXO) and dissolved in 2010. The company was the first Mac conversion manufacturer to create a pen-enabled tablet Mac computer.

Notable products include:

- Modbook – the first true Tablet Mac, this Mac conversion was based on the polycarbonate white MacBook and featured a pen-enabled, but not finger-touch-sensitive screen. The Modbook retained the entire bottom half of the donor MacBook enclosure, only removing the display and the keyboard section, replacing it with the pen-enabled 13.3-inch wide-viewing-angle display in a chrome-plated cast-magnesium bezel. Discontinued in 2010.

=== Colby Systems, Inc. ===
Founded in 1982 by Chuck Colby and operating out of Fresno, California, Colby Systems, Inc. launched its first Macintosh portable computer in 1987, after attempting to negotiate purchasing Macintosh components from Apple. In 1991, after introducing but never shipping its final portable Mac solution, the company left the Mac conversion business to work with video technology and was dissolved in 2016.

Notable products include:

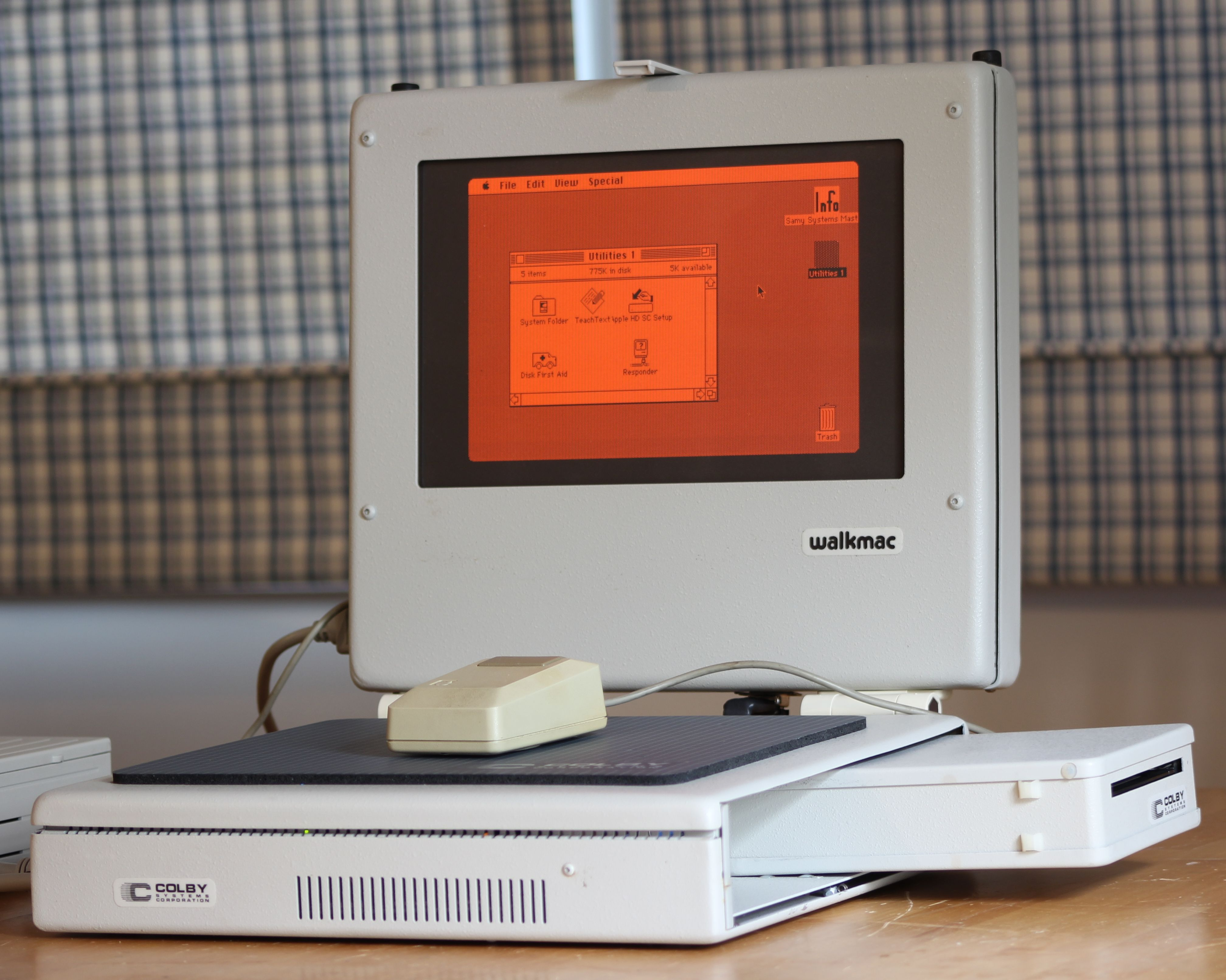
The first WalkMac, from Colby Systems, was based upon a Mac Plus logic board, with a plasma display.

- Lap-Mac – Macintosh Plus converted into a 16-pound, portable Mac computer with a detachable gas plasma screen allowing users to place a monitor on top of the device instead. Featuring 1MB RAM, one 800k floppy drive, and optional external battery pack, it had space for a modem and an ink-jet printer. Pricing started at $4,995 and the product was discontinued with the introduction of the company's WalkMac in 1987.
- The first WalkMac was a Mac conversion based upon a Mac Plus logic board, and it featured an orange plasma display. Only a mouse-pad was supplied, and a mouse, a keyboard and an external battery were needed. Special connectors on the side allowed the connection of an external FDD and/or HDD module. A collector has recently documented the acquisition and repair of one of this original WalkMac machine. The WalkMac SE and SE-30 – replacing the original WalkMac, were based on a Macintosh SE and Macintosh SE/30 respectively, and transformed the donor computers from all-in-one desktops to Mac portables with 9-inch monochrome backlit LCD Supertwist displays and internal batteries. Pricing started a $5,600 for the WalkMac SE and $6,800 for the WalkMac SE-30.
- Colby Classmate – based on a Macintosh Classic and introduced in 1991, it would have been the first Mac in a tablet-like form factor with a built-in trackball and a membrane keyboard positioned under the display. However the Classmate never went into production.

=== Dynamac Corporation ===
Dynamac Corporation, out of Denver, Colorado, also known as Dynamac Computer Products Inc., was founded as a Delaware corporation in 1970 and offered Mac portable computer systems between 1986 and 1991. In 1986 it became the first Mac portable vendor to purchase Macintosh computers from Apple at a discounted price.

Notable products include:

- Dynamac – Macintosh Plus converted into a black metal, 24-pound, portable Mac computer with a 9-inch back-lit amber electroluminescent screen and an optional, external battery pack. Based on an 8MHz 68000 CPU, and with pricing starting at $7,000, the Dynamac became obsolete with the introduction of the Apple Macintosh Portable in 1989. Discontinued.
- Dynamac EL – based on the same Macintosh Plus system as the Dynamac, the EL used a black Cycolac plastic enclosure, reducing the weight to 18-pound and dropping the starting price to $6,000. It also became obsolete with the introduction of the Apple Macintosh Portable in 1989. Discontinued.
- Dynamac LC Display – converted a Macintosh LC into a 13 ¾-pound portable Mac by attaching a 9.5-inch LCD with 640-by-480 pixels resolution and 16 shades of grey to a Macintosh LC base system. Adding the optional battery added 2 ½ pound to the system's weight. Pricing started at $1,299 for the display kit, plus the cost of the Macintosh LC. Discontinued.
- Dynamac IIsf and IIsf/30 – this 11-pound Mac portable was based on converting a Macintosh LC into a leather-cased Mac portable with a built-in 9.5-inch LCD with 640-by-480 pixels resolution and 16 shades of grey, a touchpad and an internal battery. The solution came either with the original donor Mac’s 68020 CPU (IIsf) starting at a price of $4,995 or an 68030 CPU (IIsf/30) starting at a price of $6,995. Discontinued.

=== Intelitec Systems Corporation ===
Intelitec Systems Corporation, based out of Fairfield, Iowa, offered Macintosh portable computers from 1987 until 1989 when the introduction of the Apple Macintosh Portable made their product obsolete.

Notable products include:

- MX Plus – based on a Macintosh Plus, converted into a 15-pounds portable computer in an aluminum attache case, it featured a Supertwist LCD, 1MB of RAM, two 800k Floppy drives, an internal battery, a mouse and had space for a modem and a printer. Pricing started at $5,000 and it was discontinued in 1989 with the introduction of the Apple Macintosh Portable.

=== Modbook Inc. ===
Founded in February 2012, Modbook Inc., a privately held U.S. company based out of Los Angeles, California, was a Mac conversion manufacturer. The company offered mid- and high-end pen-enabled Tablet Mac solutions for creative professionals.

Notable products include:

- Modbook Pro – introduced in 2012, this Mac conversion, built for the non-Retina 13.3-inch Apple MacBook Pro, replaced the entire enclosure of its donor Mac with a CNC-machined, all-aluminum chassis, turning it into a pen-enabled, slate-style tablet computer. Pricing started at $1,799 plus the cost for the donor MacBook Pro, and was available from the company's webstore and through Amazon.
- Modbook Pro X – initially conceived as a one-off Kickstarter project at the end of 2014, the project was merged at the end of 2016 into the development of the company's next flagship product, the Modbook Pro X with Touch Bar. In September 2017, the company announced the end of 2017/early 2018 as the anticipated launch date and pricing was expected to start at $2,499 plus the cost for the donor 15.4-inch Retina MacBook Pro.

As of January 2026, not a single system has been delivered to backers with the last update posted to the WeFunder website page for the project by Andreas Haas (CEO, Lead Engineer and Owner of Modbook Inc.), being on August 3, 2018. Another update on the page, posted around July 2023, from Mark "Merc" Mercer, Director of Experience for WeFunder states "Hello Investors, We hope this message finds you well. We wanted to let you know that we've been trying to reach out to this company for an update but haven't yet heard back from them."

=== Outbound Systems, Inc. ===
Outbound Systems Inc., based in Boulder, Colorado, and founded in 1989, offered Mac portable computer systems between 1989 and 1991, and left the Mac conversion business in 1992 to build windows-based PC solutions.

Notable products include:

- The Wallaby – announced in 1989, this Mac laptop conversion came very close to being a Mac clone as Outbound manufactured the entire computer, including the motherboard, and only required the transfer of the Mac ROM from a Macintosh Plus or SE donor computer. The company successfully characterized its solution as an extension of the donor Mac by supporting a “hive” mode. The “lobotomized” Mac could be connected to the Outbound Laptop and started normally, using the Laptop’s Mac ROM and faster 15 MHz 68HC000 CPU. Costing between $2,999 and $3,999, depending on the options (and without accounting for the cost of the donor Mac), it weighed 9.2 pounds, making it lighter and less expensive than Apple’s Macintosh Portable (15.5 pounds and $4,799 to $5,499 respectively). It was discontinued with the introduction of the Outbound Notebook in 1991.
- The Outbound – introduced in 1991, and built like its predecessor the Wallaby with only the use of a ROM from a Macintosh Plus or SE donor, the Outbound featured a true clamshell notebook design with a 10″ Supertwist 640 x 400 pixels b&w display, a replaceable daughtercard design that allowed for easy CPU and FPU upgrades, standard 30-pin SIMM RAM memory modules, and could connect through its SCSI port to the Outbound Outrigger full-page external monochrome monitor. Pricing started at $3,500 and it was discontinued in 1992.

=== Sixty-Eight Thousand, Inc. ===
Sixty-Eight Thousand, Inc., a California corporation based out of Scotts Valley, operated between 1987 and 1994, offering performance-enhanced tower workstation solutions for the high and top-end professional Mac market.

Notable products include:

- Dash 30 - based on the Macintosh II, this Mac conversion moved the Mac donor’s motherboard and assorted other components into a stainless steel tower enclosure with multiple storage bays, replaced the CPU with a much faster 32-MHz Motorola 68030 microprocessor, added a Pronto SCSI accelerator, a math coprocessor and high-speed RAM cache, allowing the system to run at several times the speed of the donor Macintosh II. Pricing started at $15,000 including the donor Macintosh II. The system was replaced by its successor, the Dash 30fx in 1990.
- Dash 30fx – introduced in 1990, the Dash 30fx, using the same enclosure and Mac conversion model as the previous Dash 30, was based on the Macintosh IIfx and included additional hardware to run the 68030 CPU at 50-MHz, a 25% speed increase over the unmodified donor Mac. Pricing for just the enclosure and the donor Macintosh IIfx started at $11,500 and $20,470 including the basic set of performance enhancements (overclocked CPU, high-speed RAM cache, SCSI accelerator)[7]. The system was replaced by its successor, the Dash 40q in 1993.
- Dash 40Q – introduced in 1993, targeting primarily the publishing industry in the prepress and color separation portions of the market, it used the same Mac conversion model and basic enclosure as the previous Dash iterations, but was based on the Macintosh Quadra 950. The 68040 CPU could be accelerated up to clock speeds of over 50 MHz and available options included a 100 MHz PowerPC 601 processor upgrade, SCSI accelerator, high-speed RAM cache, and various storage bay drives. Pricing was similar to the Dash 30fx, with $12,000 for the donor Macintosh Quadra 950 plus the deskside tower enclosure, and $22,000 including the basic performance enhancements (overclocked CPU, high-speed RAM cache, SCSI accelerator). Discontinued in 1994.
