= Modbook =

Brand of a pen-enabled Mac tablet computers

The Modbook is a brand of a pen-enabled Mac tablet computers first manufactured by Axiotron, Inc. from 2008 to 2010, and then by Modbook Inc. from 2012 to present. It is an aftermarket Mac conversion based on certain models of the MacBook and MacBook Pro product lines manufactured by Apple.

Manufactured using the original motherboard and all other core components of a previously purchased, genuine Apple laptop computer, the Modbook is able to run the Mac operating system unmodified and maintain the same level of compatibility with any Mac application, as the initial donor MacBook or MacBook Pro system.

Commercial sales of the Modbook are, like every Mac conversion before it, protected in the U.S. by the First-sale doctrine and similar legal concepts in most other countries.

Currently the company's website Modbook.com has been suspended and they have not updated the Kickstarter and Wefunder campaigns in years. After successful campaign funding and website preorders, the Modbook Pro X still has not been fulfilled to customers as of February 2022.

== Original Modbook ==
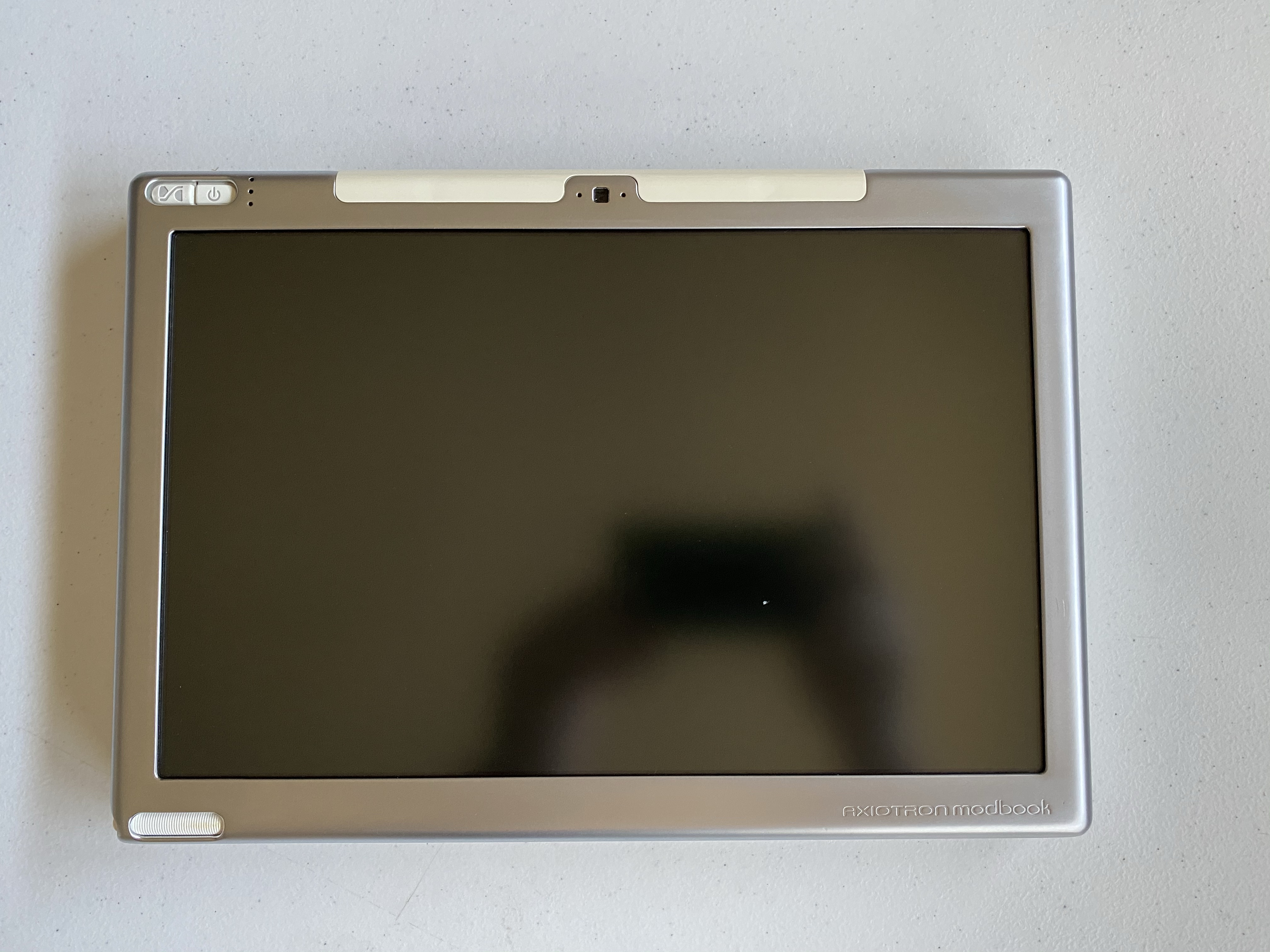
An original Modbook

Originally developed by Los Angeles, California-based Axiotron, Inc., the Modbook was introduced at the 2007 Macworld Conference & Expo as the first commercially available pen-enabled tablet Mac and won a Best in Show award.

The Modbook started shipping soon after the Macworld 2008 and was positively received as the pen-based macOS based tablet Apple fans had been waiting for, with all the components of a MacBook and a built-in Wacom digitizer for pen input, in a slate-style form factor.

The Modbook used the Apple MacBook Core 2 Duo White with speeds of 1.8 GHz and 2 GHz. Its pen support was based on Penabled Wacom digitizing technology and did not include touch input. The Axiotron Digitizer Pen featured 512 pressure levels, 2 programmable side buttons plus an eraser.

The Modbook also was equipped with a new and improved LCD panel, more suited for use as a tablet computer, offering wider viewing angles and higher contrast colors compared to the original base MacBook display. The "AnyView" display was bonded to the "ForceGlass" screen cover, which was chemically strengthened to improve the durability of the screen and featured an etched surface to improve the response of the digitizer pen.

Connectivity options on the Modbook were identical to the underlying MacBook and include two USB 2.0 ports and a single FireWire port. Networking was supported with an integrated Gigabit Ethernet port, a Wi-Fi card that supports the 802.11 a/b/g/draft-n specification and Bluetooth. The Modbook could also be connected to an external display device using a Mini-DVI port (supports DVI, VGA, S-video, and composite video). Other features included a built-in CD/DVD or DVD burner, built-in iSight Camera, built-in Mounting Locks for use with VESA compatible mounting system, and an optional built-in WAAS Global Positioning System module.

=== Conversion process ===
During the Macintosh conversion process the top segments of the MacBook are removed, which include the keyboard, LCD screen and camera. A glass screen cover, a new LCD screen, a sensor board, the original camera and a chrome-plated magnesium top shell are then installed. This is done either to a new-from-Apple MacBook for a device sold complete to a new owner, or to the customer's previously owned MacBook for an aftermarket modification.

== Modbook Pro ==
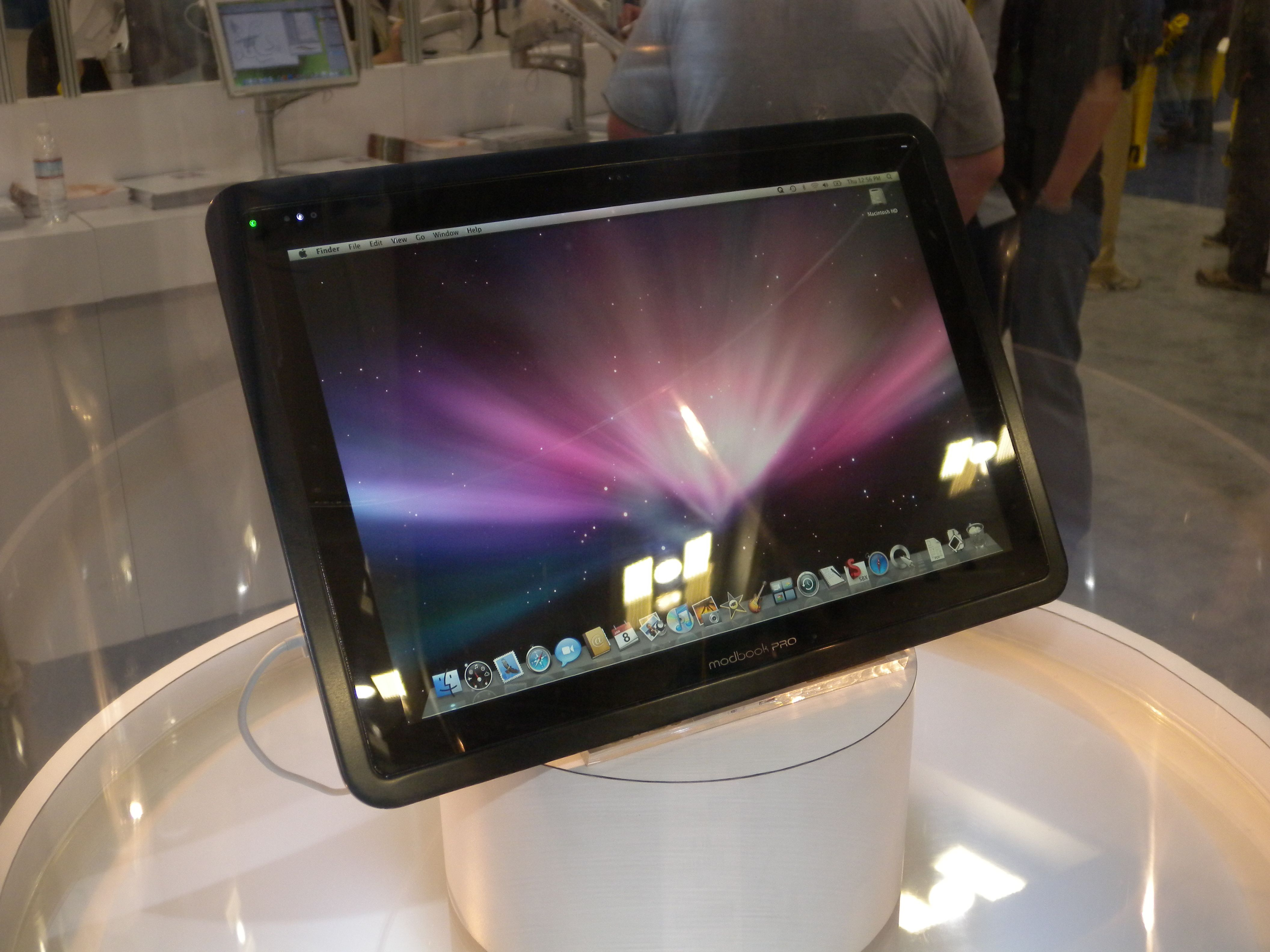
A Modbook Pro prototype on display at the Macworld Expo booth, 2009

Introduced in June 2012, by the newly founded Southern California-based Modbook Inc., the Modbook Pro uses a completely new conversion process and enclosure design to convert a MacBook Pro 13.3-inch standard display model into an all black, all aluminum slate-style pen-enabled Mac tablet. The system's specifications start with a 2.5 GHz Intel Core i5 processor with up to 16GB of RAM and either a 1TB hard drive or a 960GB SSD, with a SuperDrive and Intel HD 4000 graphics. The system can be bumped up to a 2.9 GHz Core i7 processor and additional storage options. The Modbook Pro is targeted at creative professionals looking for the power of a MacBook Pro running macOS, but in a pen-enabled tablet computer.

== Modbook Pro X ==
The Modbook Pro X was conceived as a one-off, limited production run, starting off as a successful Kickstarter project at the end of 2014. Through several delays, caused by technical challenges and subsequent Apple updates to the MacBook Pro it is based on, the Kickstarter project eventually evolved into Modbook Inc.’s next commercial product line, the Modbook Pro X with Touch Bar.

No Modbook Pro X machines were delivered to customers. Payments were not refunded.

== Modbook Pro X with Touch Bar ==
The Modbook Pro X with Touch Bar was introduced on September 14, 2017 together with Modbook Inc.’s first Equity crowdfunding campaign hosted on the Wefunder platform, and is expected to begin shipping after a successful closing of the campaign. Unlike previous Modbook models, the new Modbook Pro X is a tablet-to-laptop convertible, based on Apple's top-end 15.4-inch Touch Bar MacBook Pro models.

As of May 2026, Modbook, Inc. has not delivered any Modbook Pro X or Modbook Pro X with Touch Bar machines to any customers. Wefunder, Kickstarter, and individual preorders have not been fulfilled. The website Modbook.com has also been suspended.

== See also ==
- iPad
- Early tablet computers
