= Outbound Systems =

American computer company (1989–1993)

Outbound Systems, Inc.
- Type: Private
- Industry: Computers
- Founded: 1989; 37 years ago in Boulder, Colorado
- Founder: Warren Conner
- Defunct: 1993; 33 years ago
- Fate: Bankruptcy
- Products: Outbound Laptop; Outbound Notebook

Outbound Systems, Inc., was an American computer company based in Boulder, Colorado. Founded by Warren Conner in 1989, the company offered Macintosh clone computer systems in various portable form factors between 1989 and 1991. It left the Mac conversion business in 1992 to build Windows-based desktop computers before going bankrupt in 1993.

== Outbound laptop ==
Outbound Laptop
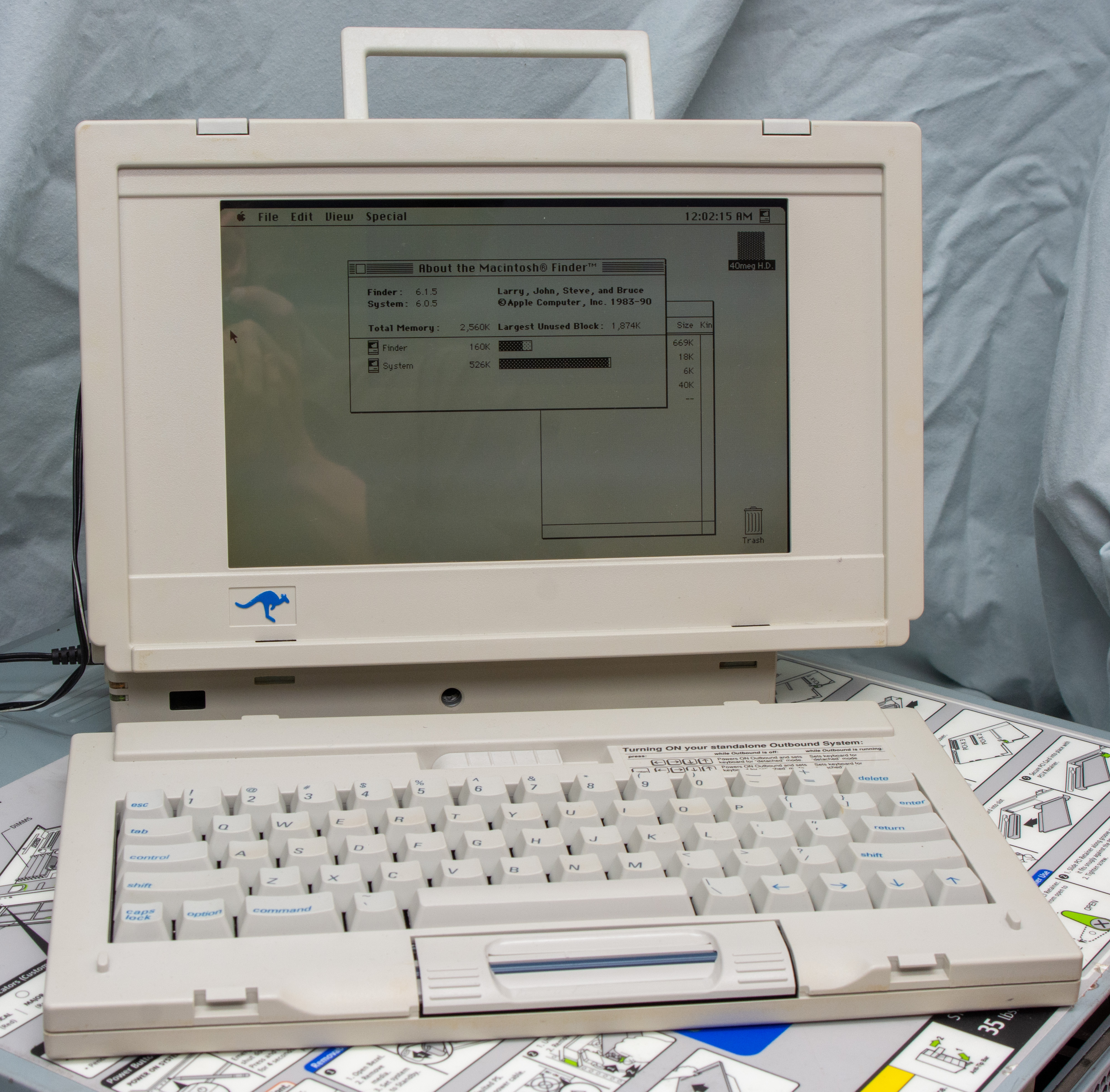
- Outbound Laptop (Model 125)
- Developer: Outbound Systems, Inc.
- Type: Laptop
- Released: 1989; 37 years ago
- Introductory price: US$4,000 (equivalent to $10,389 in 2025)
- Discontinued: 1993
- CPU: Motorola 68000, 15 MHz

The company's first product, the Outbound Laptop, was a Mac clone laptop. It is powered by a 15-MHz Motorola 68000 processor. Later versions increased the clock speed to 20 MHz.

The Outbound Laptop was introduced in 1989 and was significantly lighter, at just over 4 kg, and easier to carry than Apple's own Macintosh Portable released at around the same time. Due to Apple's refusal to license the Macintosh Toolbox in read-only memory (ROM), Outbound Laptop users had to install a Mac ROM to make the computer work. The ROM was typically removed from an older Mac, a process that would render the donor Mac unusable except when docked with the laptop using a special cable. Even with this additional cost, a typical price of $4,000 USD compared favorably to that of the Mac Portable.

The Outbound Laptop featured a built-in pointing device located below the keyboard, named the Trackbar (with earlier models referring to it under the trademark of Isopoint); it was a cylinder that scrolled up and down and slid left and right. It ran on standard camcorder batteries, rather than the expensive custom batteries commonly found in most portable computers around this time.

== Outbound notebook ==
Outbound
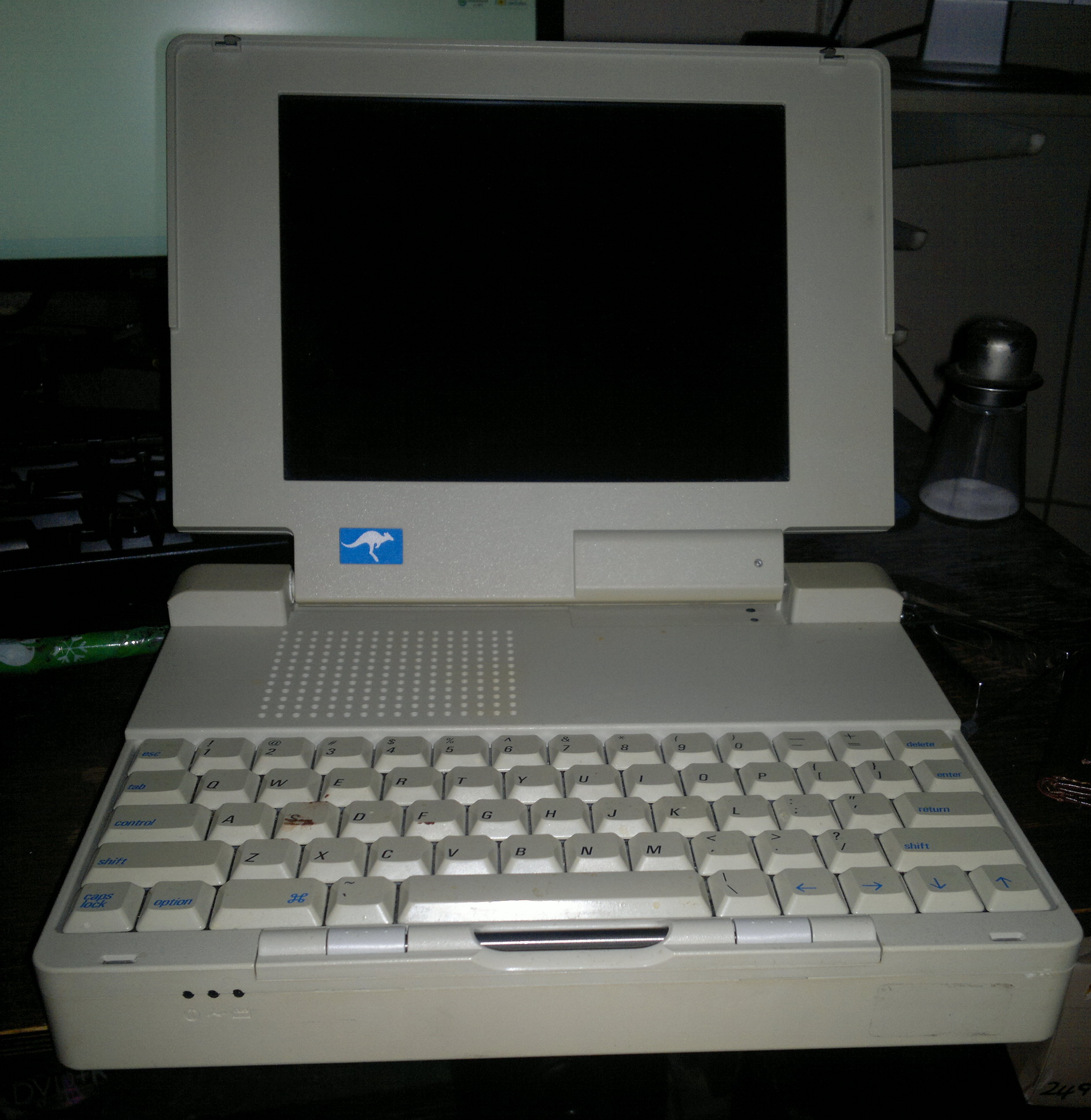
- Outbound notebook (Model 2000)
- Developer: Outbound Systems, Inc.
- Type: Notebook
- Released: 1991; 35 years ago
- Introductory price: US$3,500 (equivalent to $9,091 in 2025)
- Discontinued: 1993
- CPU: Motorola 68000, 20 MHz

The Outbound Laptop was succeeded by the Outbound notebook in 1991.

The Notebook ran on the same style of lead-acid camcorder batteries as the earlier Laptop, and had a 9.7" passive-matrix monochrome LCD. It used a 2.5" IDE hard drive, which was unusual for the time, as Apple didn't start using IDE drives in PowerBooks until the PowerBook 150 in 1994. The Notebook had an internal microphone and speaker, headphone jack, two serial ports, ADB port, and SCSI port. The Notebook's SCSI port was unique in that it supported the Outbound Outrigger full-page external monochrome monitor, which attached via the SCSI port.

The Notebook's CPU, RAM, Mac ROM, and optional 68882 FPU were mounted on a removable daughtercard. This permitted easy RAM installation and optional upgrades; the daughtercard could simply be swapped out for another one with a faster CPU, or an FPU inserted into the available socket. The daughtercard had four 30-pin SIMM sockets. Due to the Notebook's design, only 4MB of RAM could be addressed by the Mac system software, even in System 7; additional RAM would appear as a "Silicon Disk" which was an Outbound specific RAM disk.

== Demise ==
Apple's introduction of the PowerBook in 1991 led to the demise of the Mac-compatible laptop aftermarket. Probably more significant than the increased competition was the fact that Outbound was using ROMs under a licensing agreement with Apple. Apple refused to license the use of subsequent proprietary ROMs to Outbound and so the company's ability to manufacture laptops ended when the 68000 processors required by the ROMs became difficult to obtain. Although Outbound attempted a turnaround by pivoting toward building Windows-based desktop computers in 1992, mounting debts of nearly $5 million by 1993 led the company to miss payrolls and prompted the company to close its doors entirely in February that year. For a short time after Outbound went out of business, a small group of former employees set up a company, PerFit, to handle service and warranty issues. PerFit ceased operations in 1994.

== Gallery ==
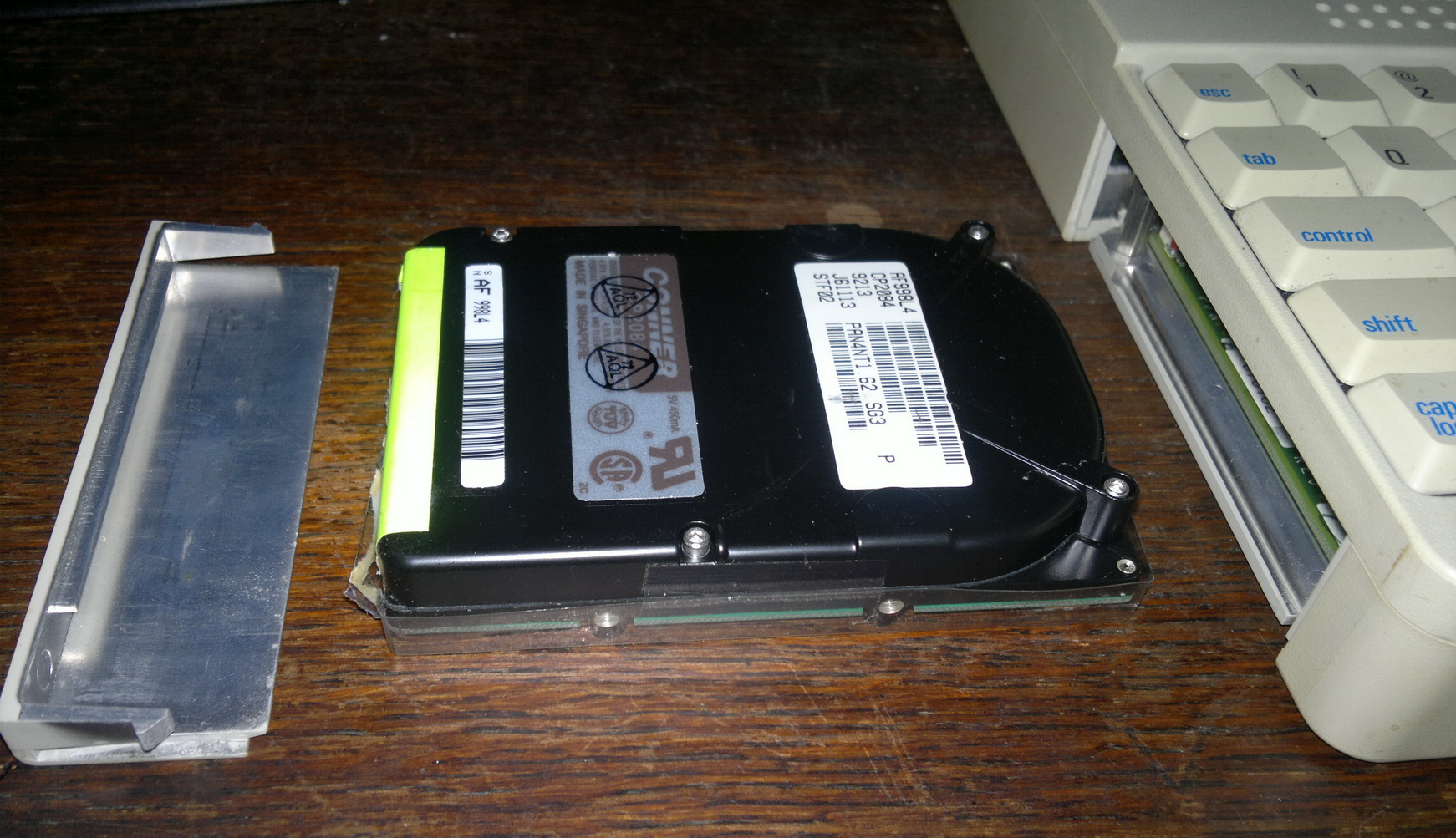
The removable hard drive, showing the drive bay and plastic shield. The shield protects the components on the bottom of the drive, as well as having a pull-tab to aid removal of the drive. The cover slides down and out.

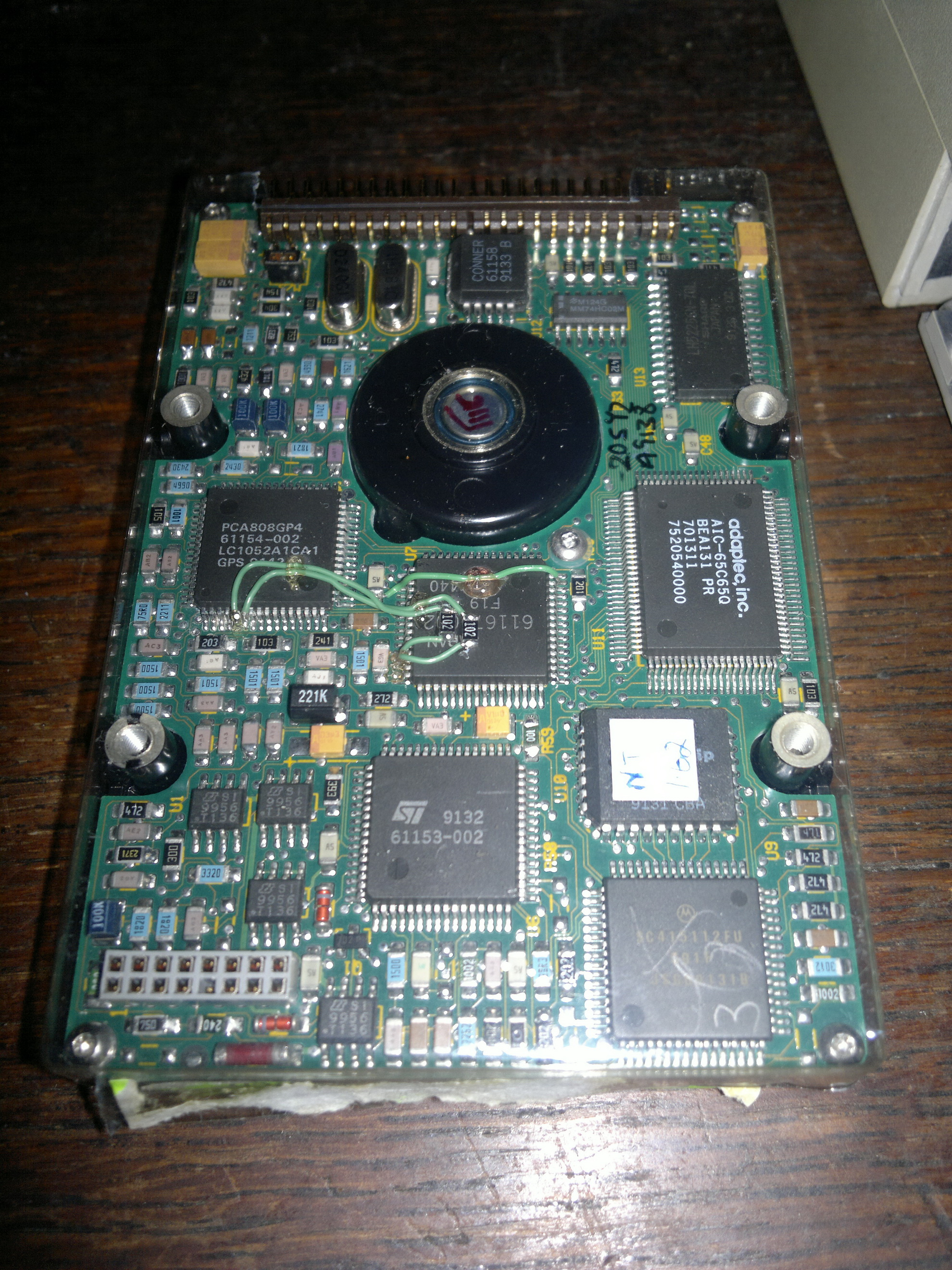
The components on the bottom of the drive.

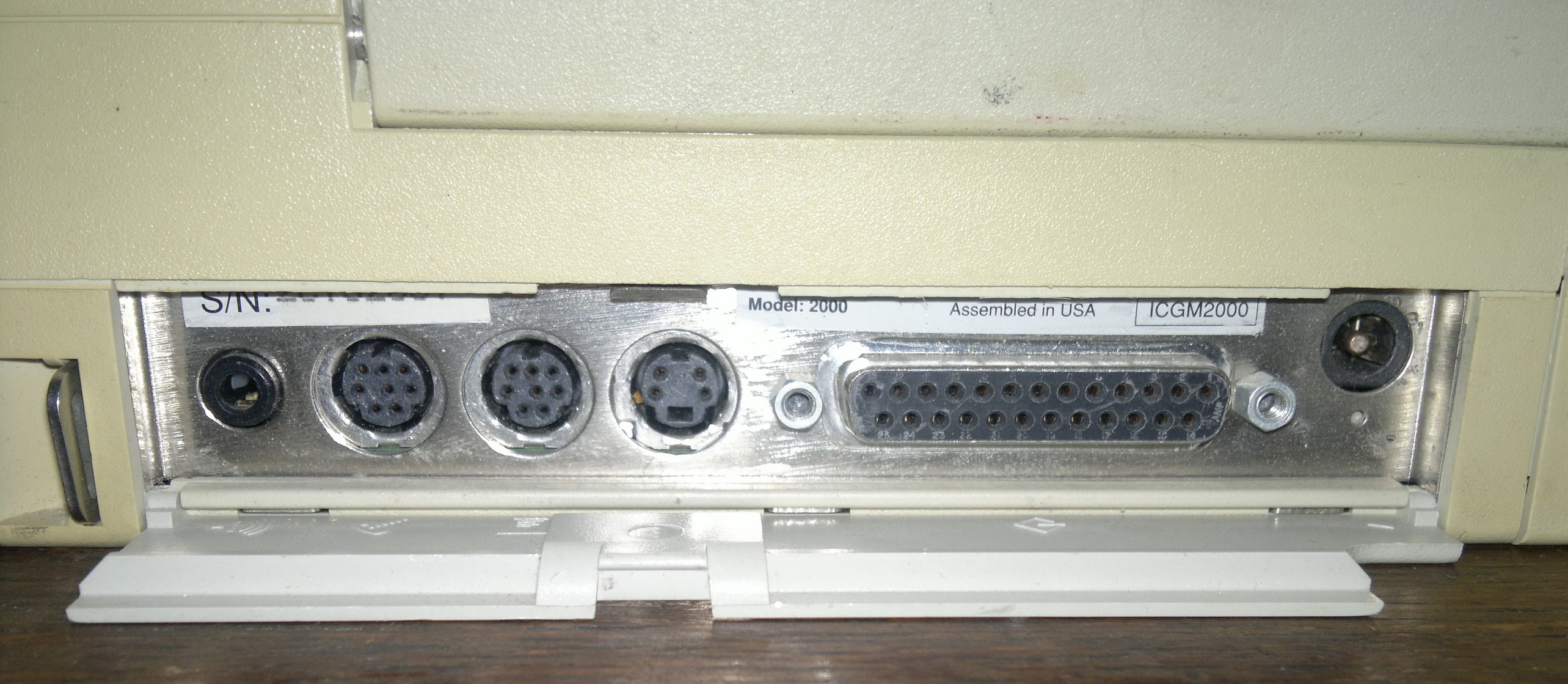
The rear connectors of the notebook.

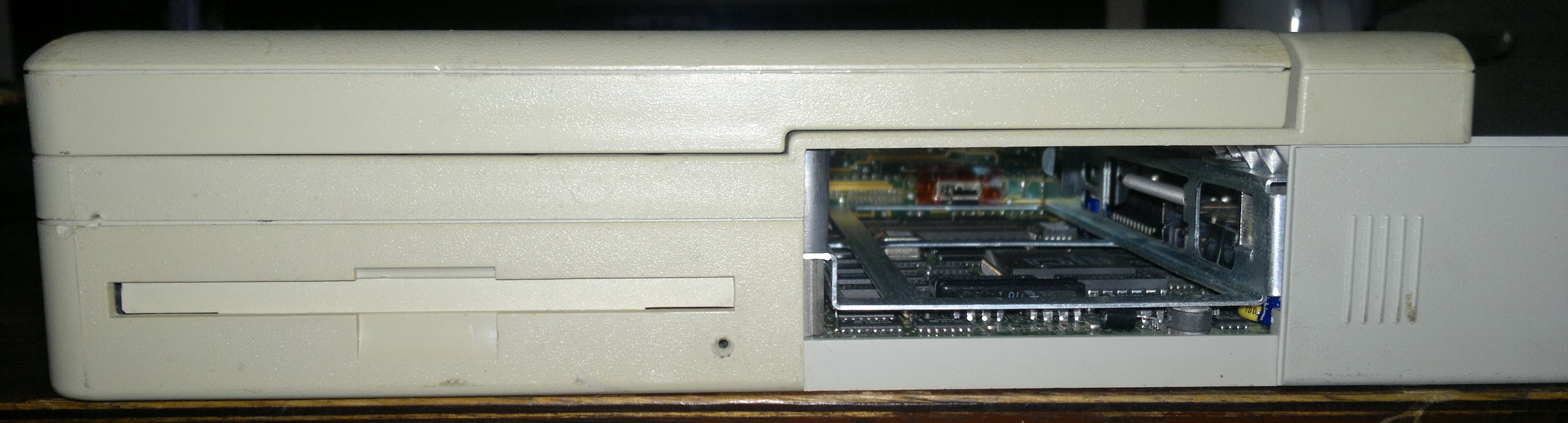
The right-hand side of the notebook case.

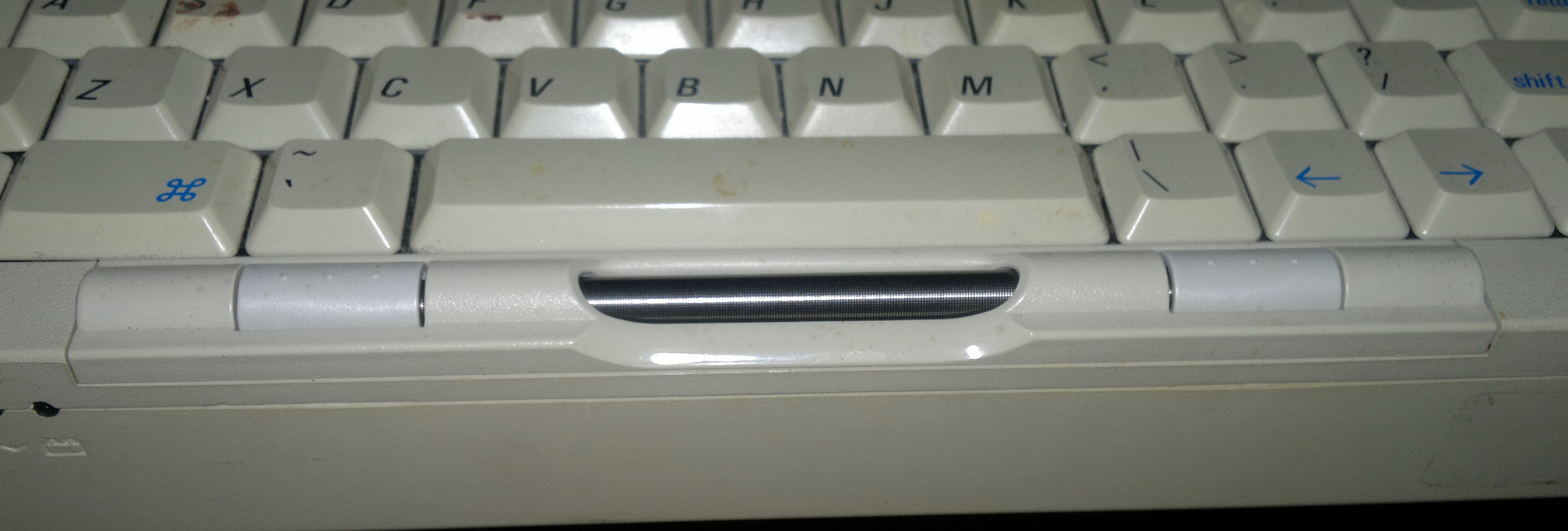
The TrackBar and two buttons, one on either side of the bar. The TrackBar rolls towards/away from the user, as well as moving left to right.

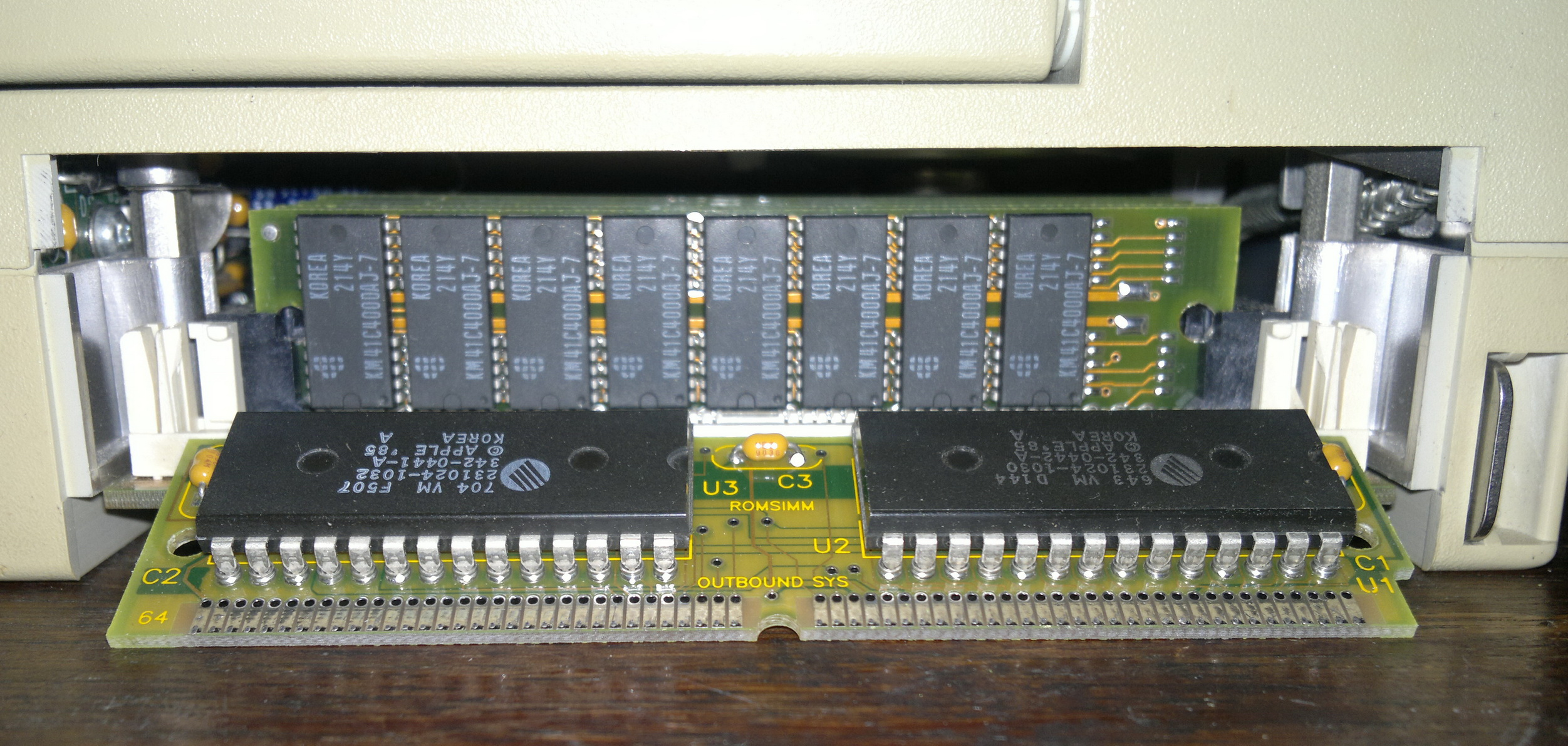
The ROM SIMM removed, showing additional memory modules. The CPU daughtercard slides out of the case to provide access to the RAM slots.

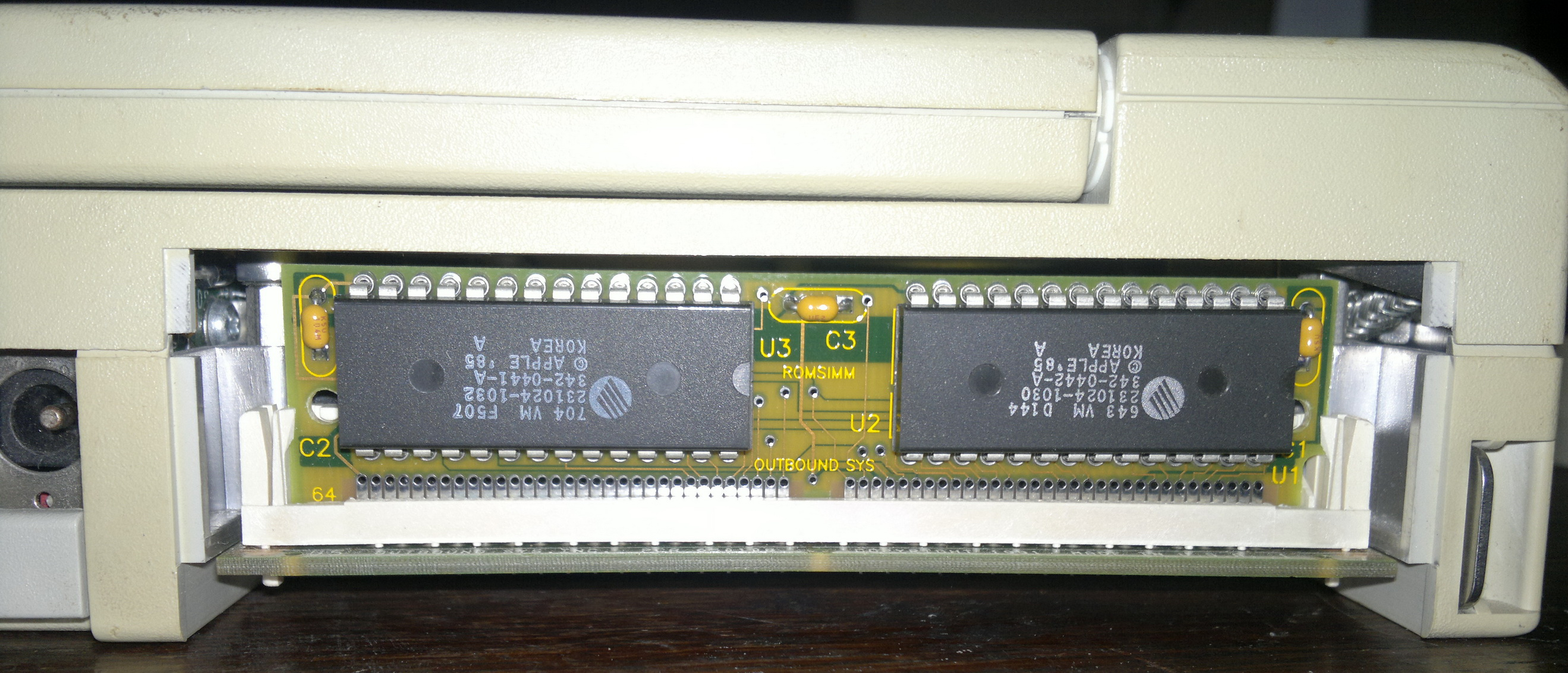
The rear has a memory access panel cover which, once removed, allows access to the CPU daughtercard.
