= Macintosh Portable =

First battery-powered portable Macintosh by Apple

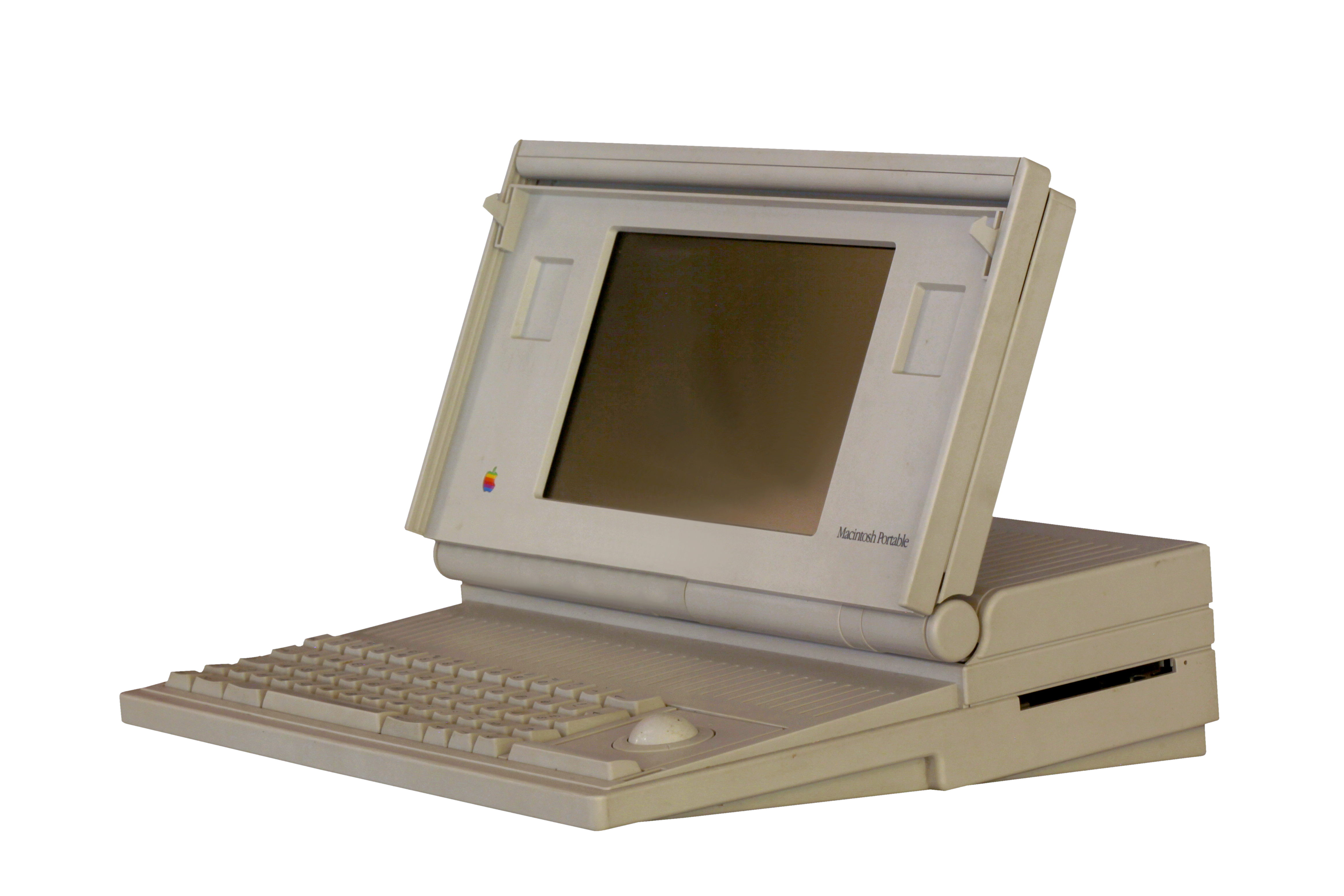
- Manufacturer: Apple Computer, Inc.
- Type: Portable computer
- Released: September 20, 1989; 37 years ago
- Introductory price: US$5,799 (equivalent to $15,100 in 2025)
- Discontinued: October 21, 1991
- Operating system: System 6.0.4 – 7.5.5
- CPU: Motorola 68000 @ 16 MHz
- Memory: Original: 1 MB, expandable to 9 MB; Backlit: 2 or 4 MB, expandable to 8 MB
- Storage: 40 MB (optional)
- Removable storage: 1.44 MB floppy drive
- Display: 9.8-inch, 640 × 400 monochrome active matrix LCD
- Input: keyboard, trackball
- Power: 6V 5Ahr lead-acid battery
- Dimensions: 4.05 × 15.25 × 14.43 in (103 × 387 × 367 mm)
- Weight: 15.8 lb (7.2 kg)
- Successor: PowerBook 100; PowerBook 170

The Macintosh Portable is the first battery-powered portable computer, designed, manufactured, and sold by Apple Computer from September 1989 to October 1991. It was among the first consumer laptop computers to use an active-matrix liquid-crystal display (LCD), which was praised for its crisp image quality and fast response time. The Macintosh Portable was designed to deliver desktop-class performance, resulting in a relatively high price and weight. Although it received favorable reviews, it sold poorly.

== Background ==
By the late 1980s, Macintosh users yearned for a portable version of their computer. Don Crabb titled his February 1989 column in BYTE "Hey Apple, I Need a Laptop". While third-party Macintosh conversions such as Dynamac and Colby existed, they were very expensive, and some as heavy as or heavier than Apple's compact Macs; Crabb's column's subtitle was "The time has come for a portable Mac that doesn't strain your arms or your credit line".

== Hardware ==
The Macintosh Portable's pointer is a built-in trackball that can be removed and located on either side of the keyboard, and can also be replaced with a numeric keypad if a mouse is being used. There were three drive configurations available for Macintosh Portable. A Portable could ship with one floppy drive, with two floppy drives, or with a hard drive and a floppy drive. The floppy drive is a 1.44 MB SuperDrive. Most Macintosh Portable units came with a hard drive, a custom-engineered Conner CP-3045 (known by Apple as "Hard Disk 40SC"). It holds 40 MB of data, consumes less power compared to most hard drives of its time, and has a proprietary 34-pin SCSI connector; third-party adapters that allow standard SCSI drives to be used on the Portable exist. At 16 pounds (7.3 kilograms) and 4 inches (10 centimetres) thick, the Portable is a heavy and bulky portable computer. The main contributor to the Portable's weight and bulk was its lead–acid battery.

The Portable went on sale on September 20, 1989, at a cost of $5,799 (equivalent to $15,100 in 2025) and $6,400 (equivalent to $16,600 in 2025) when equipped with the 40 MB hard drive. On April 1, 1990, Apple cut the price to $4,799 (equivalent to $11,800 in 2025) or $5,499 (equivalent to $13,600 in 2025) with the hard drive.

On February 11, 1991, Apple introduced a revision to the Portable with a backlit screen, at a cost of $4,199 (equivalent to $9,900 in 2025) for a model with 2 MB of RAM and a 40 MB hard drive and $4,699 (equivalent to $11,100 in 2025) for a model with 4 MB of RAM and a 40 MB hard drive.

=== Specifications ===
According to Apple, all of these models are obsolete. (Note: Apple products that have been discontinued for 7 years and no longer receive hardware support or spare parts)

Model	Original	Backlit
Introduced	September 20, 1989	February 11, 1991
Discontinued	October 21, 1991	
Model number	M5120	M5126
Processor	Motorola 68000 @ 16 MHz	
RAM	1 MB SRAM, expandable to 9 MB	2 or 4 MB pseudo-SRAM, expandable to 8 MB
ROM	256 KB	
Hard drive	40 MB SCSI (optional)	
Floppy disk	1.44 MB SuperDrive (second drive optional)	
Ports	1 × ADB, 1 × floppy, 1 × SCSI (DB-25), 2 × serial, 1 × video, 1 × headphone jack, built-in modem (optional)	
Display	9.8-inch (250 mm) active-matrix	9.8-inch (250 mm) backlit active-matrix
Resolution	640 × 400, 77 ppi, 1-bit	
Operating systems	System 6.0.4 – 7.5.5	
Dimensions (H × W × D)	4.05 in × 15.25 in × 14.43 in (103 mm × 387 mm × 367 mm)	
Weight	15.8 lb (7.2 kg)	
Refs.		

=== Display ===
Despite the dramatic improvement in terms of ergonomics offered by the responsiveness, sharpness, and uniformity of its active-matrix panel, one of the primary drawbacks of the Portable was poor readability in low-light situations, due to its lack of a backlight.

In February 1991, Apple introduced a backlit Macintosh Portable with a lowered price. The backlight was a welcomed improvement, but combined with a switch from expensive SRAM (intended to maximize battery life and to provide an "instant on" low-power sleep mode) to cheaper, more power-hungry pseudo-SRAM reduced the battery life by about half.

A dealer-installed backlight upgrade was offered to owners of the original Portable for $1,095 (equivalent to $2,588 in 2025).

=== Battery ===
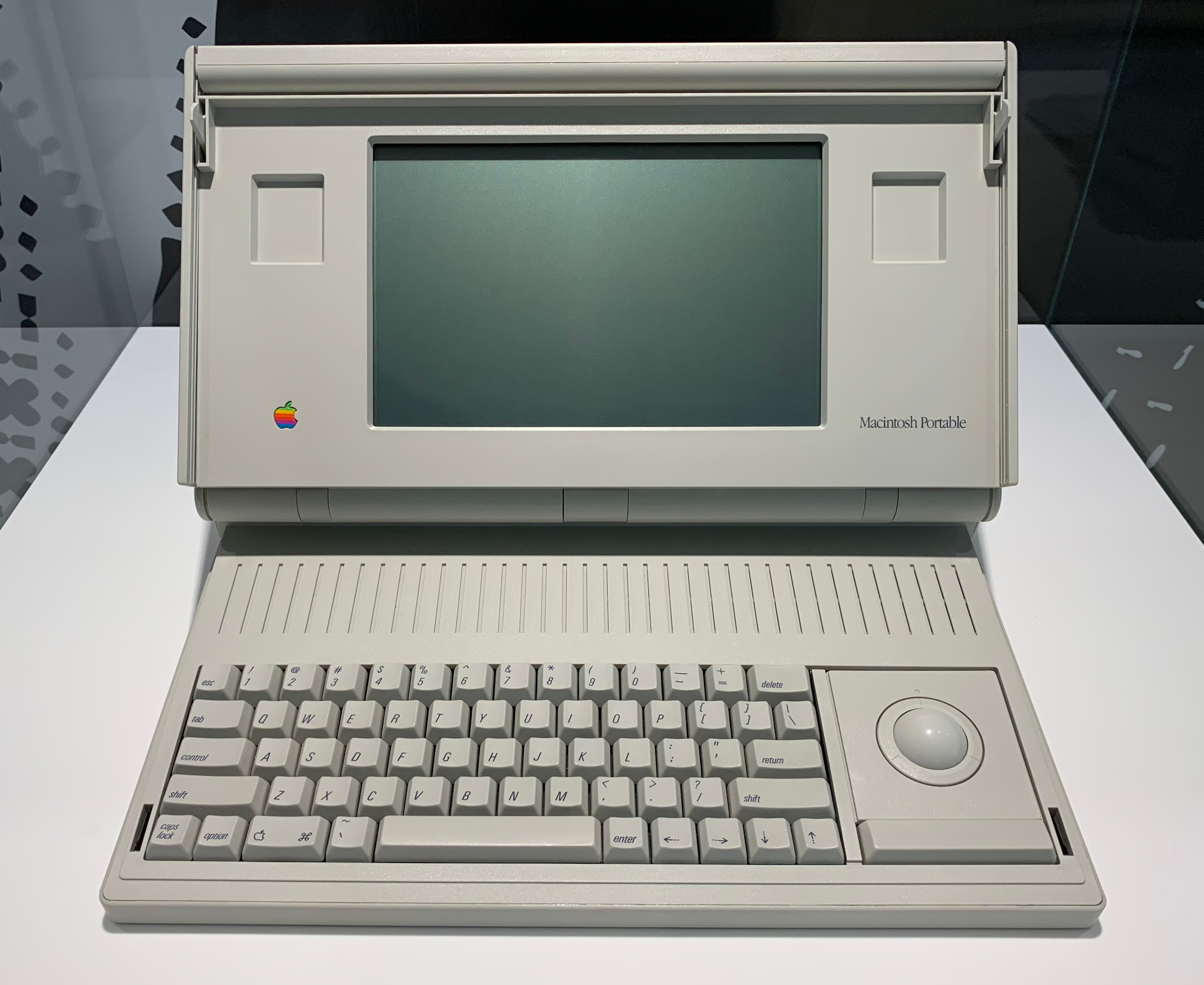
Trackball could be located to the right or left of the keyboard. Mouse button located below trackball.

The lead–acid battery pack offered up to ten hours of usage time in non-backlit models; the computer drew the same amount of power when turned off as when in sleep mode. Apple chose lead–acid cells over the nickel–cadmium (NiCad) batteries more commonly found in portable computers of the time, citing two advantages: freedom from the memory effect that degrades NiCad capacity when recharged before fully discharged, and easier direct monitoring of remaining charge. The pack charges in around three hours when the Portable is idle, or six to eight hours during use.

The Power Manager chip (a Mitsubishi 5073 processor) allows the Portable to display a gauge of remaining charge, and issues warnings when power runs low. If power runs out, the computer shuts itself down, after which the battery must be recharged within approximately four days before the contents of RAM are lost. A standard 9-volt battery maintains RAM contents when the lead–acid pack is depleted. The included AC power adapter incorporates a built-in transformer that automatically adjusts to input voltages ranging from 70 to 270 volts, permitting use in most countries.

By configuring a RAM disk and moving system files onto it to minimise hard disk access, Apple claimed users could achieve up to 15 hours of use from a full charge.

Unlike many later portable computers from Apple and other manufacturers, the Portable would not boot without the battery pack installed, as the included AC adapter did not provide sufficient power to start the hard disk. Like other sealed lead–acid batteries, the cells eventually failed if left fully discharged for an extended period. The battery packs are no longer manufactured, and working examples that will hold sufficient charge to start the computer are rare. The pack can be rebuilt with replacement cells.

== Development ==
There is some indication that Apple executives at the time, particularly Jean-Louis Gassée, were aware of the design problems concerning the Macintosh Portable. These problems, combined with supply issues of the newly developed active-matrix screen, caused numerous delays in launching the computer. While it cannot be determined what the initial internal intended launch date was, an AppleDesign illustration depicts prototypes dated 1986. Initial officially announced launch dates indicated that the Macintosh Portable would be available by June 1988. The Macintosh Portable itself also suggests a lengthy development time with a silkscreen date stamp of 1987 on the production keyboard PCB, indicating a close-to-final design was likely to have been determined by then. The computer, however, would not be launched for over two years, with the final launch date being September 20, 1989.

== Reception ==
The Macintosh Portable product launch was held at the Universal Amphitheatre in Universal City, California at an estimated cost of $1 million with over 5,000 guests. The press reaction was mixed, with many praising the clear LCD screen, but most shunning the computer due to its size, weight and high cost, with the Los Angeles Times stating "It’s too big, too heavy and too expensive." Others noted that the computer seemed behind the times compared to competing laptops, stating that "This machine would have been OK 12 months or 18 months ago. But not today."

Apple had forecast first year sales of 50,000 units. However, the computer only generated lackluster sales of 10,000 units in its first quarter on the market. Apple then reduced the price of the Macintosh Portable by $1,000 in 1990, just 7 months after launch. The company discontinued the computer in 1991 with the launch of its replacement, the PowerBook series.

== Timeline ==
Timeline of portable Macintoshes
See also: List of Mac models
