= Thomas Colby =

Thomas Colby may refer to:

- Thomas Colby (MP for Melcombe Regis) (1530–1588), English politician
- Thomas Colby (MP for Thetford) (died 1588), MP for Thetford
- Sir Thomas Colby, 1st Baronet (1670–1729), MP for Rochester
- Thomas Frederick Colby (1784–1852), British major-general and director of the Ordnance Survey

== See also ==
- Colby (surname)
