= 97th Illinois Infantry Regiment =

97th Regiment Illinois Volunteer Infantry
- Illinois flag
- Active: September 16, 1862, to July 29, 1865
- Country: United States
- Allegiance: Union
- Branch: Infantry
- Engagements: American Civil War: Battle of Fort Hindman; Battle of Port Gibson; Battle of Jackson; Battle of Champion Hill; Battle of Big Black River; Siege of Vicksburg; Battle of Fort Blakeley

The 97th Regiment Illinois Volunteer Infantry was an infantry regiment that served in the Union Army during the American Civil War. It was instrumental in the Federal campaign to reclaim the Mississippi River for the Union, participating in the siege of Vicksburg and battles leading up to it in Mississippi. Moving down the river after the siege, it participated in efforts to wrest control of the bayou area, then retake Mobile Bay, culminating in the bloody Battle of Fort Blakeley hours after Lee's surrender at Appomattox.

== Service ==
The 97th Illinois Infantry was organized at Camp Butler, Illinois, and mustered into Federal service on September 16, 1862.

The regiment was mustered out on July 29, 1865.

== Total strength and casualties ==
The regiment suffered 2 officers and 28 enlisted men who were killed in action or who died of their wounds and 200 enlisted men who died of disease, for a total of 233 fatalities.

== Commanders ==
- Colonel Friend S. Rutherford - resigned due to illness on June 15, 1864, and died of disease 5 days later.
- Colonel Lewis D. Martin
- Lieutenant Colonel Victor Vifquain - Mustered out with the regiment on Jul 29, 1865.

== Notable members ==
- Sergeant Carlos W. Colby – Company G — Participating in a diversionary "forlorn hope" attack on Confederate defenses, 22 May 1863.
- Sergeant David Dickie – Company A — Participating in a diversionary "forlorn hope" attack on Confederate defenses, 22 May 1863.

== See also ==
- List of Illinois Civil War Units
- Illinois in the American Civil War
