= Governor Colby =

Governor Colby may refer to:

- Anthony Colby (1792–1873), 20th Governor of New Hampshire
- Geoffrey Francis Taylor Colby (1906–1958), Governor of Nyasaland from 1948 to 1956
