= General Colby =

General Colby may refer to:

- Anthony Colby (1792–1873), New Hampshire Militia major general
- Leonard Wright Colby (1846–1924), U.S. Army brigadier general
- Thomas Frederick Colby
