= Max Colby =

American artist (born 1990)

Max Colby (born 1990) is an American multidisciplinary artist. She is known for her work in textiles, sculpture, installation art, embroidery, and painting. Her maximalist artwork examines themes of identity, power, camp, and domesticity. Colby lives in Brooklyn.

== Early life ==
Max Colby was born in 1990, in West Palm Beach, Florida. She is trans.

Colby studied at the School of the Museum of Fine Arts, Boston (2012 BFA degree). She also studied at the Edinburgh College of Art in Scotland, and at the Royal Academy of Fine Arts in Antwerp, Belgium.

== Career ==
Colby has participated in exhibitions in the United States and internationally, including presentations at museums, galleries, and art institutions. Her exhibition record includes museum biennials, curated group exhibitions, and gallery presentations focused on textile and material-based practices. In 2021, she was part of the group exhibition, Fringe, at Denny Dimin Gallery in New York City. Colby's first solo exhibition was titled, Revival (2022), at Shoshana Wayne Gallery in Los Angeles.

Her elaborate work in installation utilizing embroidery, beads, faux flowers, sequins, ribbons, fabric and jewelry has been described as a flamboyant celebration of self-expression through the artist's meticulous process of utopian construction of a universe. Rather than presenting ornament as purely decorative, her work recontextualizes embellishment as a critical and material strategy.

The Museum of Arts and Design (MAD) in Manhattan, where she was an artist-in-residence in 2019, has noted her use of textile techniques and material experimentation within a contemporary art context, situating her practice within broader conversations about craft and contemporary art. Her elaborate installations construct immersive environments through layered materials and handcrafted processes. Her work draws from decorative traditions and ceremonial forms while examining issues of gender, taste, and cultural hierarchy.
