= Vine Colby =

American essayist and poet

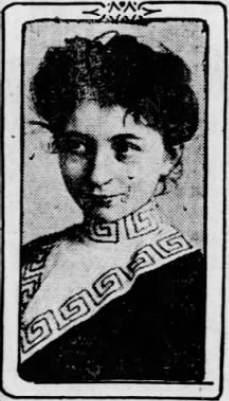
- Colby in 1912
- Born: March 11, 1886
- Died: September 1, 1971 (aged 85); Santa Barbara, California
- Education: A.B., Washington University
- Spouse: Charles Orville McCasland

Vine Colby McCasland (March 11, 1886 – September 1, 1971) was an American essayist and poet for The Potters artistic group in St. Louis, Missouri, in the early 20th century. After the Potters disbanded, she became a journalist and writer of short stories, and engaged in a career of sociological and economic study.

== Early life and family ==
Vine Colby was born on March 11, 1886, the daughter of Branch Harris Colby. and granddaughter of Celestia Rice Colby (1827–1900). Celestia Rice Colby's diaries were published in 2006 under the title Circumstances are Destiny: An Antebellum Woman's Struggle to Define Sphere, edited by Tina Stewart Brakebill. Colby's aunt, from whom she received her name, was Vine Cynthia Colby (1852–1878).

== Education and awards ==
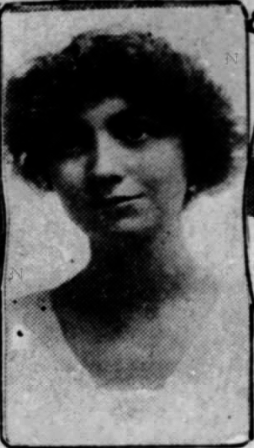
Colby in 1913

In 1903 Vine won the elocutionary contest of the members of the Central High School Girls' Literary Society for her recital of The Forsaken Merman. She graduated from Central High School in 1904 and won a graduation prize: a scholarship to Washington University in St. Louis. Colby's averages were higher than those of winners in several previous classes. At the award ceremony she presented an essay by the title of Through the Ballad Gate.

While at college, Colby performed in various dramas. In 1904 she was the Queen Indifference in The Downfall of Indifference in a performance in honor of Martha McCoy, president of the St. Louis College Club. In 1905 she was in the cast of Two Gentlemen of Verona presented by the Washington University Dramatic Club. In 1909 she was the Mad Hatter from Alice in Wonderland for a reserved performance for the 80 female members of the St. Louis College Club.

She graduated from Washington University with an A.B. in 1908. From 1906 to 1912 she was the secretary to the Washington University Board of Publication. In 1912–1913 she obtained a Senior Fellowship from the St. Louis School of Social Economy to be trained for social service.

In 1912 she hosted a party that made the news for its originality. The theme was "Lovers' Breakfast" and eight St. Louis young women masquerading as "celebrated sweethearts of history" joined the guests: Wilhelmina Weber was Samson, Agnes Cady was Delilah, Gussie Isaacs was Romeo, Clara Cady was Juliet; Julia Cady was Antony, Nancy Coonsman was Cleopatra, Vine Colby was Tristan, Annette Newmark was Isolde.

== Artistic career ==
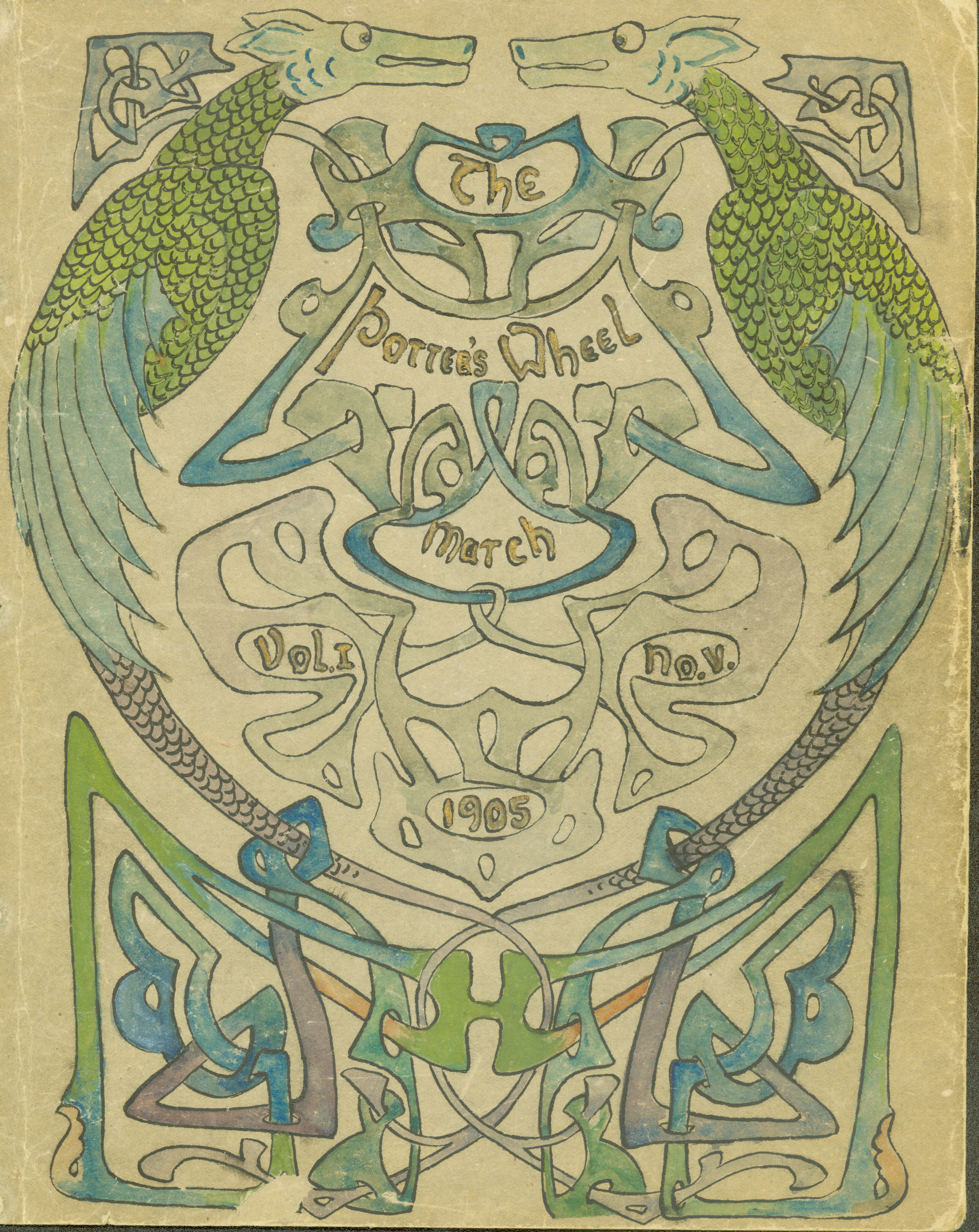
The Potter's Wheel, Volume 1, Number 5, March 1905, cover drawn by Vine Colby shows two dragons looking at each other

Colby was a member of The Potters, a women's artistic group that published a handmade magazine, The Potter's Wheel, from November 1904 to October 1907. Colby contributed her art and poetry to the magazine. After the Potters disbanded, she became a journalist and writer.

Colby is also remembered for her poetry. Her friend Sara Teasdale, also a member of the Potters, selected Coby's poem "The Rainbow" for inclusion in The Answering Voice: One Hundred Love Lyrics by Women (1917).

In 1919 Colby's play Merciful Hands was selected with seven other plays by the Committee on Drama and Pageantry of the St. Louis Art League to be read at the Artists' Guild Theater.

After her marriage, as Vine McCasland, she wrote the poem "Circus" which was included in a 1920 anthology and later selected by the British Council.

== Personal life ==
In the 1910s Colby lived at 5790 McPherson Avenue, St. Louis.

On November 2, 1912, she married Charles Orville McCasland of Springfield, Massachusetts. After the marriage, the McCaslands moved for three years to Springfield; they moved back to St. Louis in 1915 and lived at 6163 Berlin Avenue. In the 1940s census she was living with her husband and daughter, Barbara, at 1554 Las Lunas, Pasadena, California.

She died on September 1, 1971, in Santa Barbara, California.
