= Lucy Coleman =

Australian rower

Personal information
- Nationality: Australian
- Born: 29 March 1998 (age 28)
- Home town: North Star, New South Wales, Australia
- Height: 168 cm (5 ft 6 in)
- Weight: 57 kg (126 lb)

Sport
- Country: Australia
- Sport: Rowing
- College team: Tulsa Golden Hurricane
- Club: Sydney University Boat Club
- Coached by: Ellen Randell
Medal record
Women's rowing
Representing Australia
World Cup 2
Silver medal – second place	2022 Poznań	Lwt W2x

Lucy Coleman (born 29 March 1998) is an Australian representative lightweight rower. She is an Australian national champion and has represented at senior World Championships.

== Club and state rowing ==
Coleman was raised in far western NSW and boarded at St Hilda's School in Southport where she took up rowing. She first made state selection for Queensland in the 2017 women's youth eight which contested the Bicentennial Cup at the Interstate Regatta within the Australian Rowing Championships.

Coleman then studied at the University of Tulsa in Oklahoma and rowed at varsity level. She won a silver medal in a lightweight women's double scull at the US IRA Championships in 2018. Following her return from the USA she rowed from the Sydney University Boat Club.

In 2021 in SUBC colours she won the open lightweight women's quad scull title at the Australian Rowing Championships and placed second in the open lightweight double scull.

In 2023 she made NSW state selection in the lightweight quad scull to contest the Victoria Cup at the Interstate Regatta. That crew was victorious.

== International representative rowing ==
In March 2022 Coleman was selected in the Australian senior training team to prepare for the 2022 international season and the 2022 World Rowing Championships. She rowed Australia's lightweight double scull with Anneka Reardon at the World Rowing Cup II in June 2022 to a silver medal. At the 2022 World Rowing Championships at Racize, she again raced the lightweight double with Reardon. They finished fourth in the B final for an overall tenth place finish at the regatta.

In March 2023 Coleman was again selected as a sculler in the Australian women's lightweight squad for the 2023 international season. At the Rowing World Cup II in Varese, Italy Coleman raced as Australia's WLW2X entrant with Anneka Reardon. They made the B final and finished in overall ninth place. At 2023's RWC III in Lucerne, Coleman and Reardon again raced the WLW2X finishing in overall tenth place. Coleman and Reardon were selected to race Australia's lightweight coxless pair at 2023 World Rowing Championships in Belgrade, Serbia. They placed third in their heat and ultimately won the C final for an overall 13th place at the regatta.
