= Senator Colby =

Senator Colby may refer to:

- Everett Colby (1874–1943), New Jersey State Senate
- Leonard Wright Colby (1846–1924), Ohio State Senate
