= Donor =

A donor in general is a person, organization or government which donates something voluntarily. The term is usually used to represent a form of pure altruism, but is sometimes used when the payment for a service is recognized by all parties as representing less than the value of the donation and that the motivation is altruistic. In business law a donor is someone who is giving the gift (law), and a donee the person receiving the gift.

More broadly, the term is used to refer to any entity that serves as the source of something transferred to a different entity, including - in scientific fields - the source of matter or energy passed from one object to another.

The Online Etymology Dictionary traces the English-language word "donor" back to the mid-15th century, with origins in Anglo-French, Old French, Latin and Proto-Indo-European.

== In science ==
Often the word is used as a shorter term for:

- Blood donor
- Donor (semiconductors)
- Egg donor
- Electron donor — (by analogy) a technical term in chemistry and semiconductor physics (see also the next entry)
- Organ donor
- Sperm donor

== In society and international relations ==
- Benefactor (law)
- Donor government or donor organisation in official development assistance
- Grant (law)
- Patronage

== In art ==
- Donor portrait — portrait of the person who paid for a painting, typically in a church

== In literature ==
In fairy tales, a donor is a stock character that tests the hero (and sometimes other characters as well) and provides magical assistance to the hero when he succeeds.

== See also ==
- Sponsor (commercial)
- The dictionary definition of donor at Wiktionary
