= Testrup Højskole =

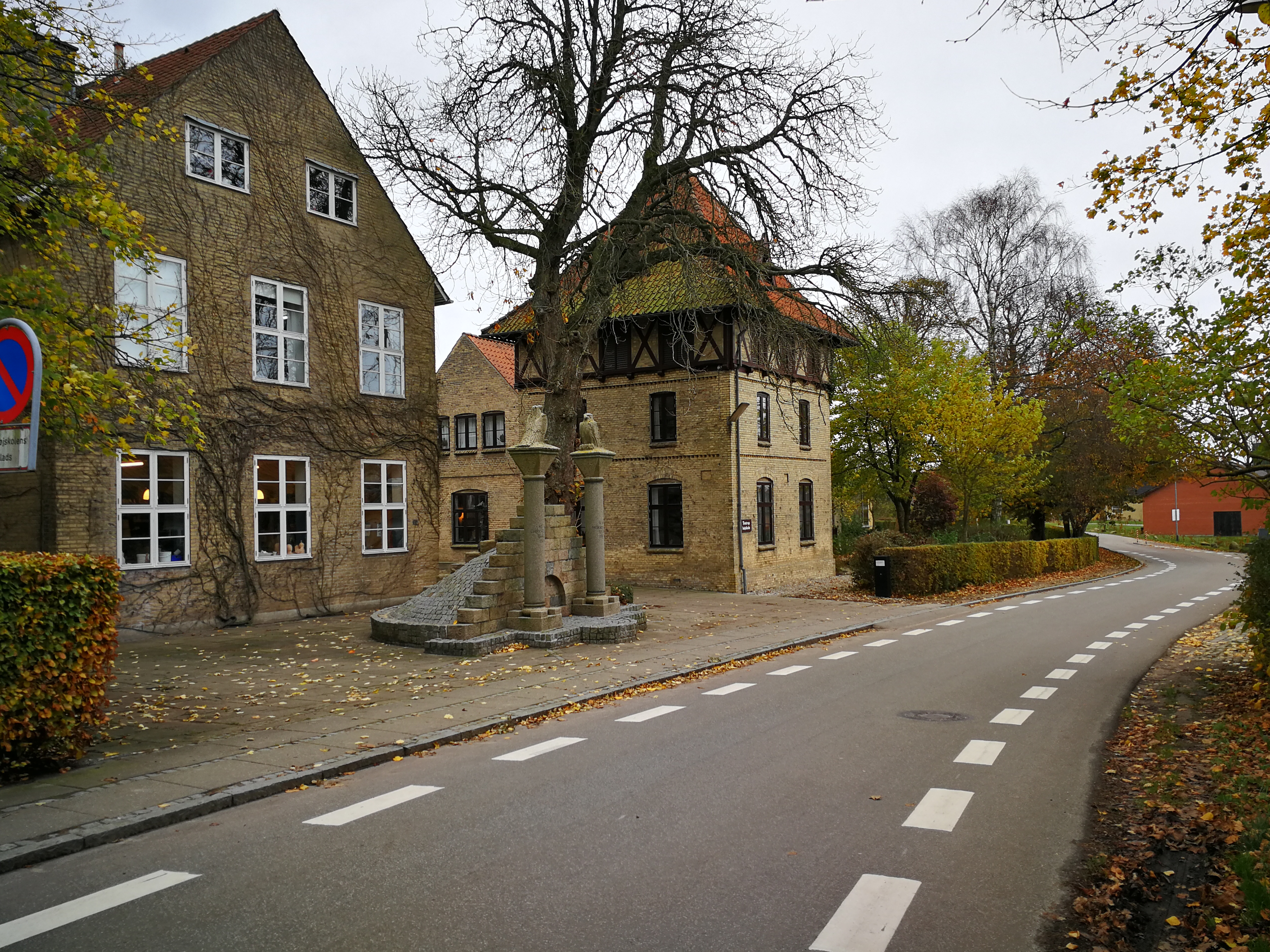

Location
- Testrup, Denmark
- Coordinates: 56°4′1.45″N 10°8′5.3″E

Information
- Established: 1866
- Website: testrup.dk

Testrup Højskole (English: Testrup Folk High School) is a Danish Folk High School based on the philosophy of N. F. S. Grundtvig. It was founded in 1866 by theologist Jens Nørregård. The School is situated south of Aarhus in the small rural town of Testrup and offers curriculums in five subjects: music, drama, art, philosophy, and creative writing. The headmaster since the summer of 2017 has been Simon Axø.
