= Vine Cynthia Colby Foster =

American female doctor (1852-1828)

Vine Cynthia Colby
- Born: 1852
- Died: March 1878 (aged 25–26)
- Education: B.Ph. from College of Literature, Science and the Arts, University of Michigan (1876); Medical Degree (1877)
- Occupation: Medical Practitioner
- Known for: One of the pioneering women in medicine
- Spouse: Sidney Foster (m. 1873)
- Relatives: June Rose Colby (sister); Vine Colby (niece)

Vine Cynthia Colby (1852–1878) was an American medical doctor and prominent figure among the early women in medicine.

== Early life ==
Vine Cynthia Colby was born in 1852, bearing the names of her mother's best friends, Vine and Cynthia, who both died at a young age. The Colby women were known for their high level of education, uncommon for their era. This was largely attributed to the efforts of Colby's grandmother, Celestia Rice Colby (1827–1900). Celestia's diaries, which detailed the family's progressive approach to education, were posthumously published in 2006 as Circumstances are Destiny: An Antebellum Woman's Struggle to Define Sphere, edited by Tina Stewart Brakebill.

In June 1870, after graduating from high school in Freeport, Colby relocated to Ann Arbor, Michigan with her family. There, she enrolled at the University of Michigan.

== Education and personal life ==
Colby married Sidney Foster, a fellow University of Michigan student, on December 19, 1873. Both graduated from the institution, with Sidney completing his degree in 1874 and Colby earning a B.Ph. from the College of Literature, Science and the Arts in 1876.

== Career ==
In 1877, the couple moved to Keokuk, Iowa, where they both graduated from medical school. Subsequently, they relocated to Moira, New York, where they started a joint medical practice.

== Death ==
Colby Foster died at the age of 25 in March 1878 due to pelvic peritonitis. She is interred at Moira Community Cemetery in Moira.

== Legacy ==
Colby Foster's influence extended to her sister, Dr. June Rose Colby. June Rose graduated with an A.B. from Literary Class of State Normal School in 1878 and furthered her education with graduate degrees in 1885 (A.M.), and 1886 (Ph.D.). Upon her death in 1936, June Rose bequeathed $500 (equivalent to $7,788.13 in 2017) to the University of Michigan League in Ann Arbor. The funds were used to purchase German and French books for the Rest Room of the League Building. Each book acquired with this donation bears an inscription in memory of Vine Colby Foster.

Vine Cynthia Colby's legacy also continues through her namesake, Vine Colby, a member of The Potters (artists group) and her niece.
