= Chuck Colby =

American electronics engineer

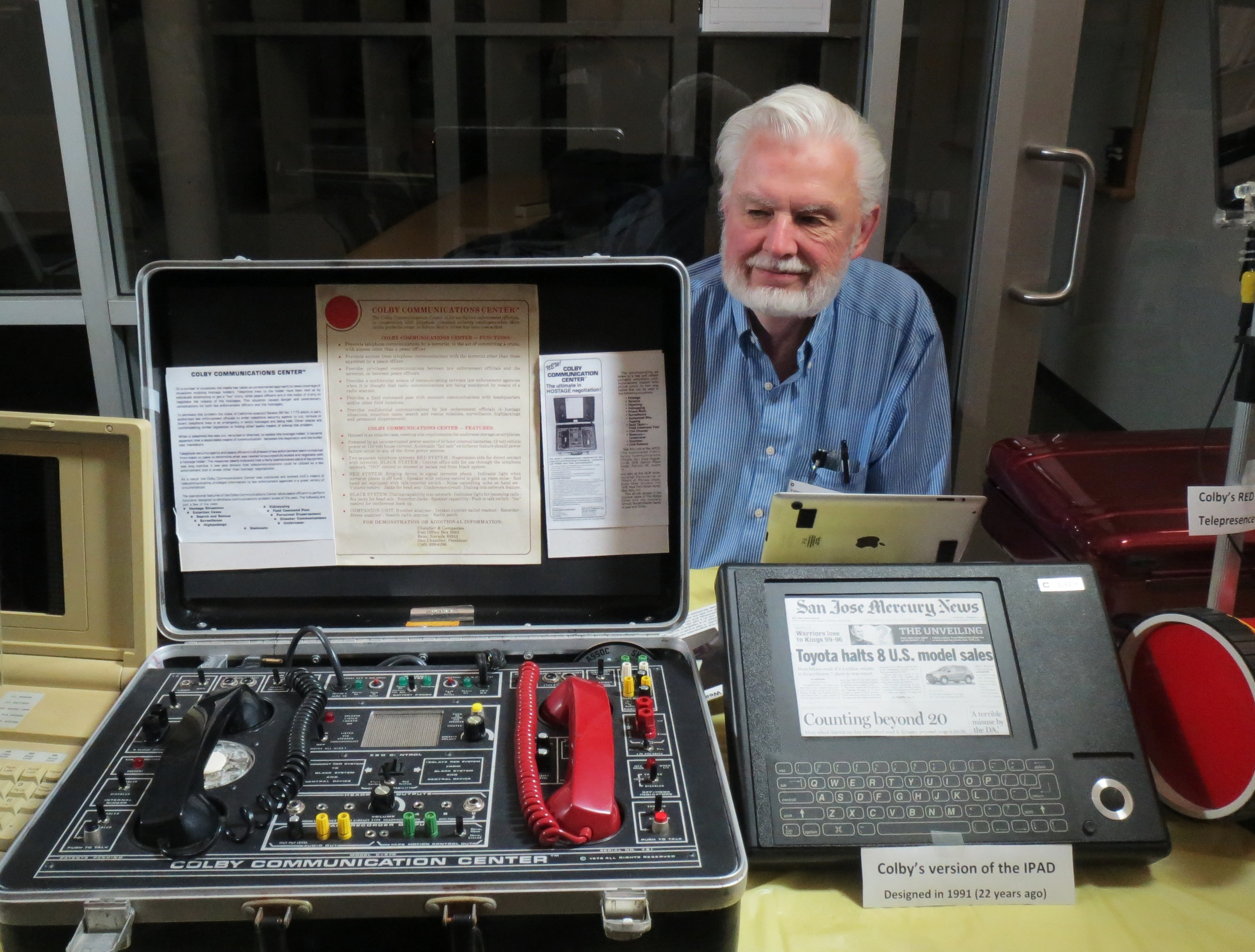
Chuck Colby at the reunion of the Homebrew Computer Club on November 11, 2013.

Chuck Colby was an electronics engineer and founder of Colby Systems Corporation (later Colby Computer, Inc.), a company that created the first DVR-based video surveillance systems and the first to market both MS-DOS and Mac portable computers.

== Early inventions ==
Colby's first invention was the Colby TR-2 transistor radio, which he designed at the precocious age of 12 and sold to family, friends and customers on his paper-route, and is possibly the first pocket transistor radio. At 15, he built for his high school science project the world's first home earth satellite station capable of receiving signals from the Russian satellite Sputnik. As a college student, his passion for radio and inventing brought him attention in the LA Times when he and a friend built their own TV stations to broadcast video to each other over the airwaves. Shortly afterwards, he built a video security system for use by NASA.

Chuck Colby also helped design the "Syzygy" original prototype of Atari Pong that was built into a suitcase so that it could be carried around and demonstrated to potential investors. On July 10, 2003, he donated the prototype to the DigiBarn Computer Museum.

In the 1980s, Colby created and marketed the first PC clone motherboard and was among the first to market with portable, expandable DOS-compatible computer such as the Colby PC-1 and PC-5 while most other companies were only producing portable computers that ran CP/M. This is a notable milestone as CP/M systems were generally fixed to 64Kb while the DOS offered applications the ability to directly address a full megabyte, allowing for larger and considerably more powerful applications. Colby Systems would continue this trend by producing some of the very earliest portable Macintosh conversions, such as the ruggedized "luggable" MacColby and the WalkMac laptop, which could be purchased with a 68030-based SE/30 motherboard which generated sales even after Apple's first laptop hit the market because Apple's Macintosh Portable was only available with the considerably slower 68000 microprocessor as used in the original Macintosh, the Macintosh 128K.

Colby is also mentioned in Steve Wozniak's book iWoz as having introduced Wozniak to early satellite television, which was mentioned as the impetus for Wozniak to leave Apple so he could design, then start a company to market, the first programmable learning TV remote, the CL 9. Nolan Bushnell, who founded Atari and Chuck E. Cheese's Pizza-Time Theaters, wrote "Chuck Colby is a fountain of ideas and represents the best of a creative person one that thinks of things and then can build them."

In November 2020, Colby's estate attested that he had died.

== Inventions ==
- Classmate Tablet Computer
- IBM Clone Motherboard
- Portable DOS machine
- PDA and Wearable Computer
- Telephone Answering Machine
- Cassette Fast-Winder
- Cantaloupe Grading Machine
- Home Satellite Earth Station
- Low Cost TV Camera
- Police Hostage Phone
- DVD Jukebox
- Police Radar Detector
- Police CarMac
- Underwater TV Camera
- Pocket Transistor Radio
- Video Modem
- Portable Video Editor
- Pocket Data Terminal
- Corded Keyboard/Trackball
- Low Cost 1" Sq TV Camera
- Low Cost Digital Stopwatch
- Plasma Display Mac
- Driver Awake
- Color Organ
- Low Cost Video Earth Station
- Police Car DVR/Computer
- Wireless Telephone
- Digital Airport Security System
- Casino Recorder in Las Vegas
- Low Cost Video Conferencing System
- Video Security System for NASA
- MPEG-2 Digital Video Recorder
- MPEG-1 Digital Video Recorder
- Portable Mac
- Mac Laptop
- Heads-up Display Mac
- Tempest Mac
- Portable Pong
- Video thru Cellular Transmission System
- Low Cost Carry-on PeopleMover
- Wireless 2-Way Video Conferencing System
- Ergonomic Robotic Controller
- One way motion sensing switch
- Customized '49 Studebaker
- TV production Van with 4 Channel Audio
- Citizen Band Walkie-Talkies
- Hand Held Laser Pointer
- Robot with 4-way Articulating Wheels
- Voice Activated Switch
- Portable Paging Center
- Portable Video Editing System
- Colby DVR-5000
- Mobile TV Units for the Army
- Telephone Remote Activation Switch
- Color Videomodem VM-4
- Wireless Video Cameras
- Phone Card Dialer
- Video editing system using 2 " tape
- TV Camera in Viewfinder of 35mm Film Camera
- Sing and Strum Wireless guitar Pickup
- Scuba Slurp Gun
- Rack mount PC
- Low cost folding motorized wheelchair
- Low-cost VideoPhone
- Transportable Satellite Uplink Station
- Streaming MPEG Video via T1 Line System
- MPEG-2 Portable DVR
- Low-Cost 360 Degree TV Camera
