= June Rose Colby =

American literary scholar (1856–1941)

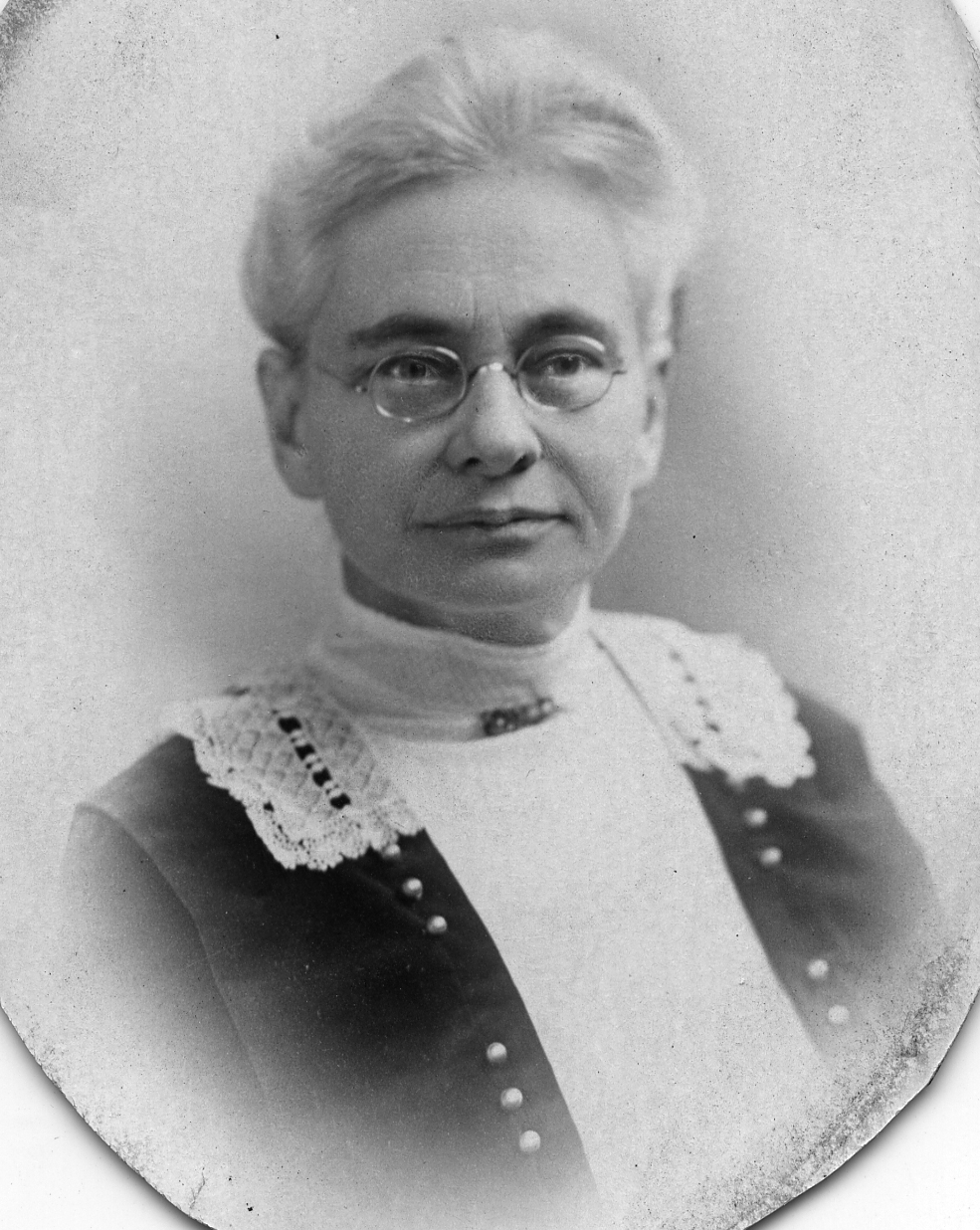
- Born: June 4, 1856; Cherry Valley, Ohio
- Died: May 11, 1941 (aged 84); Normal, Illinois
- Education: University of Michigan (PhD, literature)
- Occupation: Professor of literature

June Rose Colby (June 4, 1856 – May 11, 1941) was an American professor of literature. She was the first female faculty member and third woman hired as an instructor at Illinois State Normal University, and was a supporter of the Suffragist movement.

== Early life and education ==
She was born on June 4, 1856, in Cherry Valley, Ohio, second daughter and the fourth of five children of Lewis Colby and his wife Celestia Rice. Her father was a dairy farmer, while her mother found an outlet for her literary interests by writing essays. In 1866 the family moved to Freeport, Illinois, where her father earned income as a lightning rod salesman. June had been home schooled up to this point, but now attended public school. The family moved again in 1870 to Ann Arbor, Michigan so that June's sister Vine could study at the University of Michigan.

After June graduated from Ann Arbor High School, she matriculated to the University of Michigan. Four years later she graduated with an A.B. degree, then taught in high school from 1878 until 1883. Initially she taught algebra at Ann Arbor High School, then became preceptress and taught Greek and Latin at the high school in Flint, Michigan. While employed there, she founded a literary society for female students to investigate women’s issues. She left for further education at the Harvard Annex, now called Radcliffe College, then transferred back to the University of Michigan where she received an A.M. degree. In 1886, she became the first woman at the University of Michigan to receive a Ph.D. by examination. Her thesis was titled Some Ethical Aspects of Later Elizabethan Tragedy, Preceded by an Examination of Aristotle's Theory of Tragedy.

== Career ==
For six years after graduating she was unable to receive a professorship and was instead employed as a teacher in high schools in Peoria. Finally, in 1892 she was hired by the Illinois State Normal University as a professor of literature. Dr. Colby became the third female professor to be hired at the university. During her career, she served as Dean of Women and became a sponsor of the university's Sapphonian Society. She had several works published and was an editor on a study of Silas Marner by George Eliot. As an outspoken feminist, she supported the Suffragist movement and was a member of the Normal Equal Suffrage Association, organized in 1911. Given her participation with the Suffragist movement, she was in contact with several famous Suffragist leaders, such as Jane Addams, Carrie Chapman Catt, and Mary A. Livermore. There are also multiple recorded letters between herself and Julia Ward Howe.

== Sapphonian Society ==
Colby used this group as a way to introduce female ISNU students to women’s issues. One of the goals of the Sapphonian Society was to combat the spreading idea of the “feminization of education,” which asserted that the reason why young men strayed away from education was due to the concentration of women and their influence within schools, or that being the reason for their becoming "effeminized.” Colby manipulated the increasingly masculine academic environment through the society in her use of “discreet rhetoric,” as opposed to overt resistance to the idea. Rather than openly claiming her pedagogy as feminist in nature, she designed it in a way that let the audience come to such conclusions themselves.

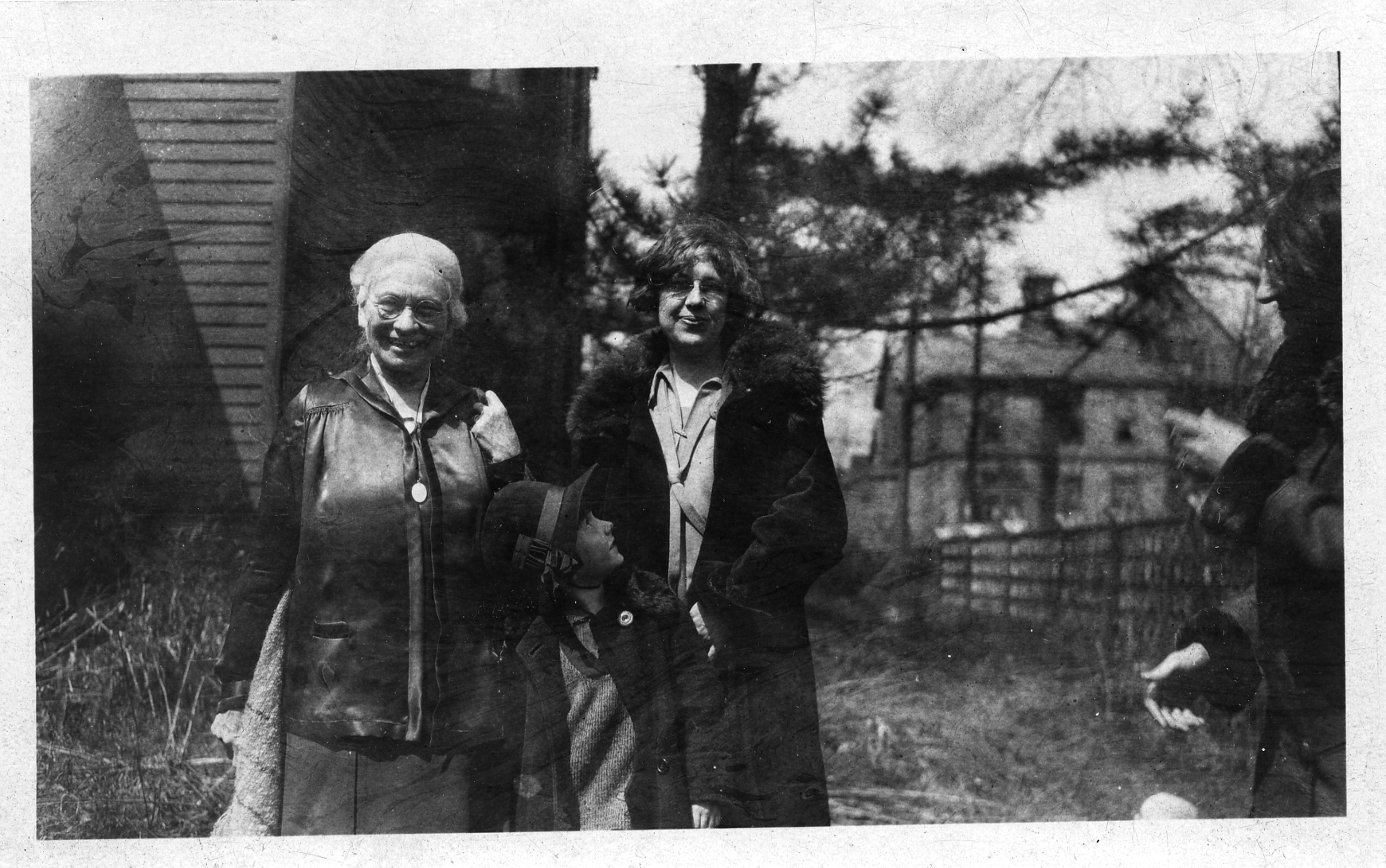
Photo of June Rose Colby with an unidentified woman and child, undated.

This club originated from its parting from the all-male debate society called Cicero. However, the Sapphonians wanted to go beyond simply being an all-female counterpart, but rather an entity with complete separation and autonomy from the male debate team. These women then went even further to establish their own mode of conversation, as opposed to Cicero’s strict debate format, to instead focus on literature and discussion. Colby had great influence on these changes.

The Sapphonians sought to better their community and did not limit their learning to the classroom. One member noted that "the Sapphonian Society not only assures the members of many interesting and instructive programs but also affords them, thru its committee formation, an instruction of a somewhat different character from that which can be obtained in required school work.” Despite the relatively private nature of the club, the members were still able to contribute to society and gain practical writing experience that the traditional university courses did not permit them. It was Colby’s desire to grant these women such experiences and empower them through academia. She rejected the notion that women who succeeded in college would not contribute to society post-graduation.

Colby strongly promoted “silent” activism, which was largely epitomized through her contributions to the society. She felt it was more effective to advocate for change in this way to appeal to those who were otherwise against the Suffragist movement, or other feminist advancements. She did not want to garner “unwanted attention” to the Sapphonian Society, as a way to protect its members.

Shortly after 1897, though, the group did turn its focus to addressing issues within their own campus. At this time, ISNU’s president was David Felmley, who repeatedly contended that women were less intelligent than men and promoted the masculinization of education, thus emphasizing the Sapphonian’s on-campus obstacles. One effort to combat these increasingly popular ideas was the society’s invite extension to all women, students and faculty alike, to attend their meetings. This was proven successful given the membership increase, as the club went from 23 members in 1905 to 42 in 1906. Pushing even further, Colby urged the members to contact women from other colleges throughout the country. A College Committee dedicated to women’s issues was henceforth established.

Despite Colby’s silent activism approach, she came to write “Some Often Forgotten Aspects of the Relation of Women to the Industrial World” for ISNU’s newspaper, The Vidette, which was likely purposed as rebuttal to the ideas put forth by Felmley.

The Sapphonian Society ultimately lasted from 1887-1912; Colby was its mentor from 1892-1908.

== Retirement and death ==
When she retired in July, 1931, she was named Emeritus Professor of Literature. The now demolished Colby Hall at Illinois State Normal University was later named after her.

Colby died on May 11, 1941, in Normal, Illinois.

== Bibliography ==
- Some Ethical Aspects of Later Elizabethan Tragedy (1886)
- Literature in the Elementary School (1903)
- Shakespeare in the High School (1903)
- Literature and Life in School (1906)
