= IXMicro =

American graphics chipset and video card manufacturer

iXMicro, Inc.
- Formerly: Integrated Micro Solutions
- Industry: Computer
- Founded: 1994; 32 years ago in San Jose, California
- Defunct: 2000; 26 years ago
- Products: Graphics chipsets; Video cards

iXMicro, Inc., a privately held company, was a graphics chipset and video card manufacturer. The company was founded as Integrated Micro Solutions (IMS) in 1994 by Komori Iwakura and Thomas Holmes ceased operations in 2000. The American actor Christopher Knight served as vice president of graphics marketing for iXMicro.

== Products ==
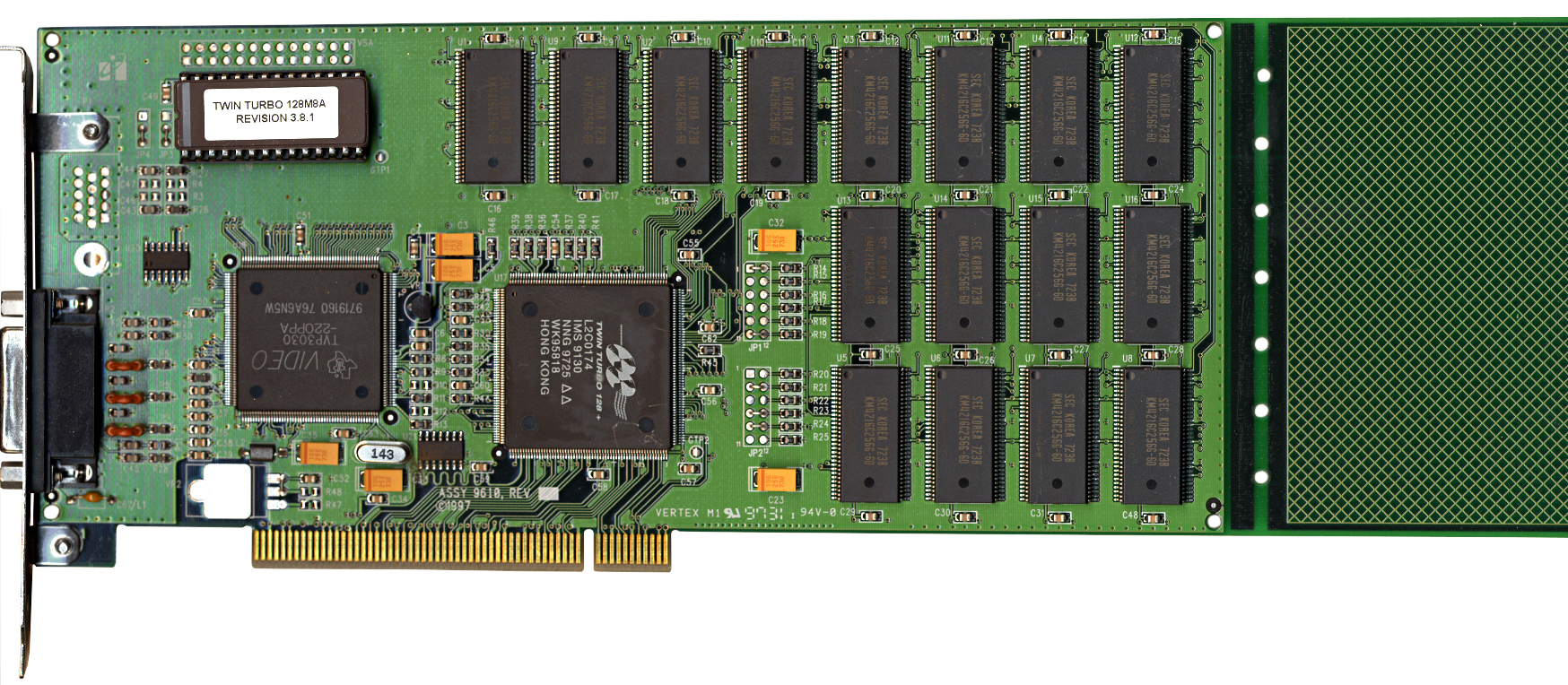
IMS Twin Turbo 128 video card

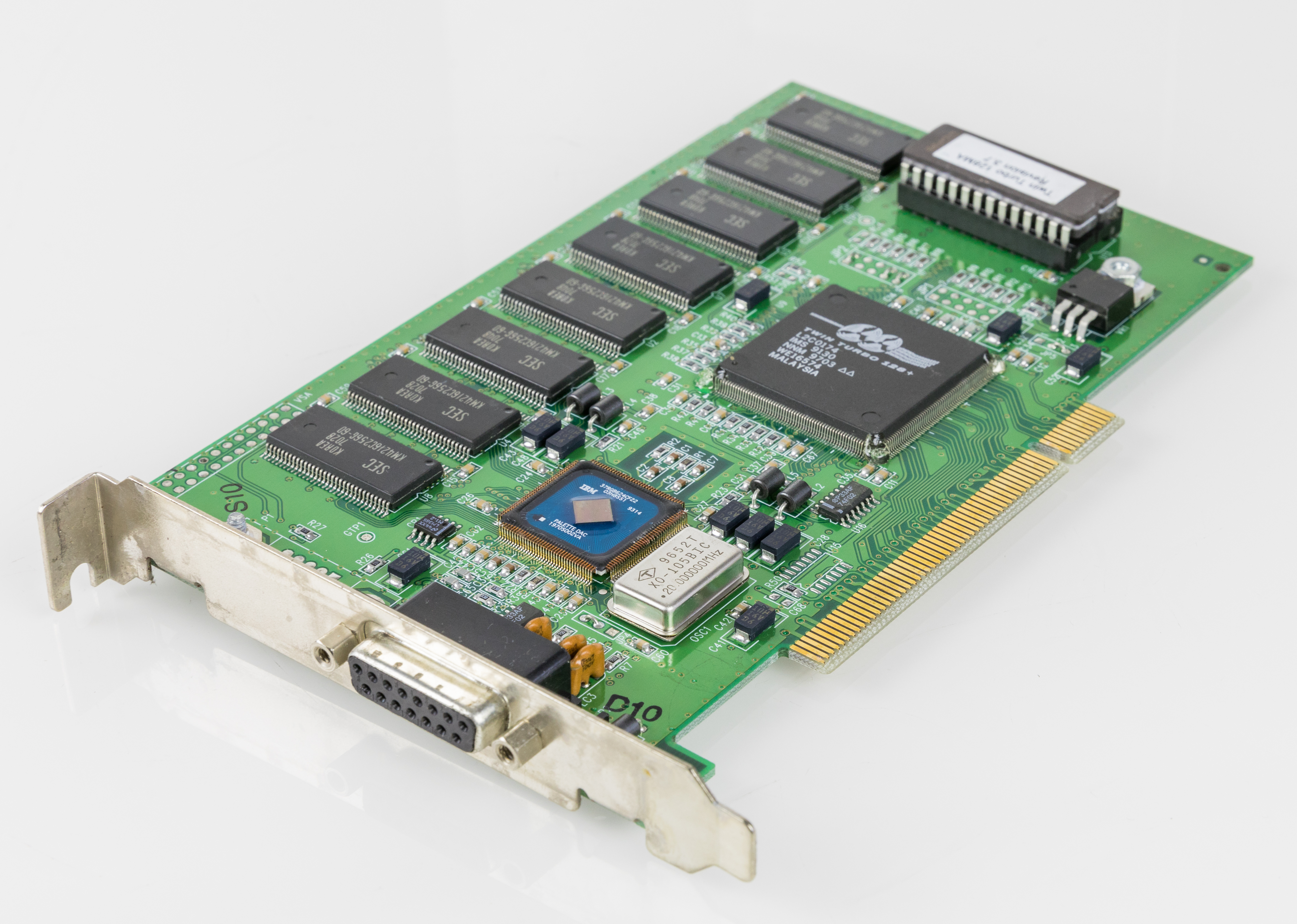
Twin Turbo 128MA

=== Video cards ===
- The Twin Turbo-128 PCI series, including the 128S and 128P2, came standard on the Power Macintosh 9600 and was a high-performance upgrade for the Power Macintosh 8600.
- The TwinTurbo 128M8, a PCI video card, came with the Motorola StarMax 5000/300. This video card was also used in the Umax Pulsar 2500 (SuperMac S900/250). It has 8MB SGRAM.
- The ix3D Dual Monitor was a dual-monitor video card for Mac and clones.
- The ix3D Game Rocket was a 3D accelerator based on the 3dfx Voodoo Banshee chipset.
- The ix3D Road Rocket was a 2D and 3D CardBus video accelerator for the Apple Macintosh PowerBook G3 series, with 4 MB SGRAM and support for an extended desktop at 1280×1040.
- The ix3D Pro Rez was a 128-bit 2D and 3D graphics accelerator with 8 MB of SGRAM. It supports resolutions up to 1600×1200 and refresh rates as high as 100 Hz.
- The TwinTurbo 128P8 was a PCI video card for the PC x86 market with standard 15-pin VGA connector.

=== Video capture ===
- iXMicro also offered ixTV or Turbo TV video capture devices.

=== ATM cards ===
- The Lightning II ATM 155/25 PCI cards

== See also ==
- Macintosh clone
