= PearC =

- Industry: Computer hardware; Computer software; Consumer electronics
- Headquarters: Hamburg, Germany
- Website: PearC.de

PearC is the name given to the line of personal computers produced by German manufacturer HyperMegaNet UG, that sells PCs with Mac OS X, similar to Psystar. HyperMegaNet UG claims it is acting within the law because Apple's EULA – that forbids installation of Mac OS X on non-Apple branded computers – only applies if it can be seen before purchase, according to German law.

The PearC line of personal computers consists of six models: PearC Starter, PearC Advanced, PearC Professional and PearC Expert, PearC Supreme, and PearC Business. All models are built using off-the-shelf components from Intel, Gigabyte Technology, Corsair, Nvidia, Western Digital and Lian-Li. Every computer ships with a USB drive of Mac OS X Mountain Lion to allow re-installation of the operating system. The company also offers dual-boot computers that run Windows 7 and Mac OS X Mountain Lion.

PearCs ship with a completely unmodified copy of Mac OS X. Instead they use the freely available Chameleon bootloader and a number of kernel extensions installed on the EFI System partition to allow them to boot Mac OS X Mountain Lion. If an Apple software update is likely to cause problems, the company advises its customers and releases a freely available patch in the form of a package installer.

All PearC personal computers come with a two-year warranty.

The company sells from websites in Spain: https://web.archive.org/web/20100402070452/http://www.pearc.es/ and Germany http://www.pearc.de/

All current products capable of running Mac OS X use Intel's 'Ivy Bridge' generation of processors.
