= Power Computing Corporation =

Defunct computer company

- Type: Private
- Founded: November 11, 1993
- Founder: Stephen "Steve" Kahng
- Defunct: January 31, 1998
- Fate: Liquidation
- Headquarters: Austin, Texas, US
- Website: powercc.com at the Wayback Machine (archived 1996-12-27)

Power Computing Corporation (often referred to as Power Computing) was the first company selected by Apple Inc to create Macintosh-compatible computers ("Mac clones"). Stephen “Steve” Kahng, a computer engineer best known for his design of the Leading Edge Model D IBM PC clone, founded the company in November 1993. Power Computing started out with financial backing from Olivetti and Kahng.

The first Mac-compatible (clone) PC shipped in May 1995. Like Dell Computer, Power Computing followed a direct, build-to-order sales model. In one year, Power Computing shipped 100,000 units with revenues of $250 million in the first year. Power Computing was the first company to sell $1,000,000 of products on the Internet.

Power Computing released upgraded models until 1997 with revenues reaching $400 million a year. The Mac clone business was stopped after Steve Jobs returned as interim CEO of Apple in July 1997. In September, Apple bought the core assets of Power Computing for $100 million in Apple stock and terminated the Mac cloning business.

== History ==
Power Computing Corporation was founded on November 11, 1993 in Milpitas, California, backed by $5 million from Olivetti and $4 million from Kahng. At the Macworld Expo in January 1995, just days after receiving notice he had the license to clone Macintosh computers, Kahng enlisted Mac veteran Michael Shapiro to help build the company. Shapiro helped to develop the original logo and brand and worked with Kahng to build the initial management team. Power Computing opened manufacturing and operations offices in Austin, Texas at the recently abandoned facilities of PC clone builder CompuAdd and engineering offices in Cupertino, California, staffed largely by members of Apple's original Power Macintosh team. In 1997, PCC relocated its headquarters to a location directly across I-35 from Dell's main campus, and remained there until Apple acquired PCC's assets in 1997. Kahng set out to create a simplified Mac design that made it cheaper and faster to produce the machines. He then targeted the mail-order market, where Power Computing could get a quicker return on its money than it could by selling through distributors.

"With direct mail, you get your money back in days by credit card instead of the 30 to 60 days it takes for the resale channel to repay," Kahng said.

At that time, Apple was leaning towards giving licenses to big-time computer makers. Initially, even with Kahng's reputation as a "master cloner", getting Apple to take him seriously was a challenge. He ended up bringing Olivetti people with him to meetings. Apple engineers gave him the help he needed to make a Mac prototype. The team reduced the size of the Apple main circuit board so that it could fit into a standard PC box. They also used off-the-shelf PC power supplies and monitors.

A few days before the end of the year, it was announced that Apple Computer picked Power Computing to be its first Macintosh clone maker. Jim Gable, Apple's director of Mac licensing was quoted in The Wall Street Journal saying "[Kahng] is clever and fleet of foot. We want him to succeed."

Power Computing's goal was to have clones available for as little as $1,000 each starting in March or April 1995. John C. Dvorak, a computer columnist at MacUser magazine, remarked, "Apple is not going to know what hit them. Stephen Kahng is tenacious." When the machine was released, Macworld's review said

“The first clones work as well as Apple's Macs. That alone represents an auspicious start to Apple's reversal of its decade-long go-it-alone strategy. Although these first clones introduce no compelling new technologies, breathtaking features, or stunning industrial designs, they prove that Mac clones can be legitimate alternatives to Apple's own Macs.”

=== Initial machines ===
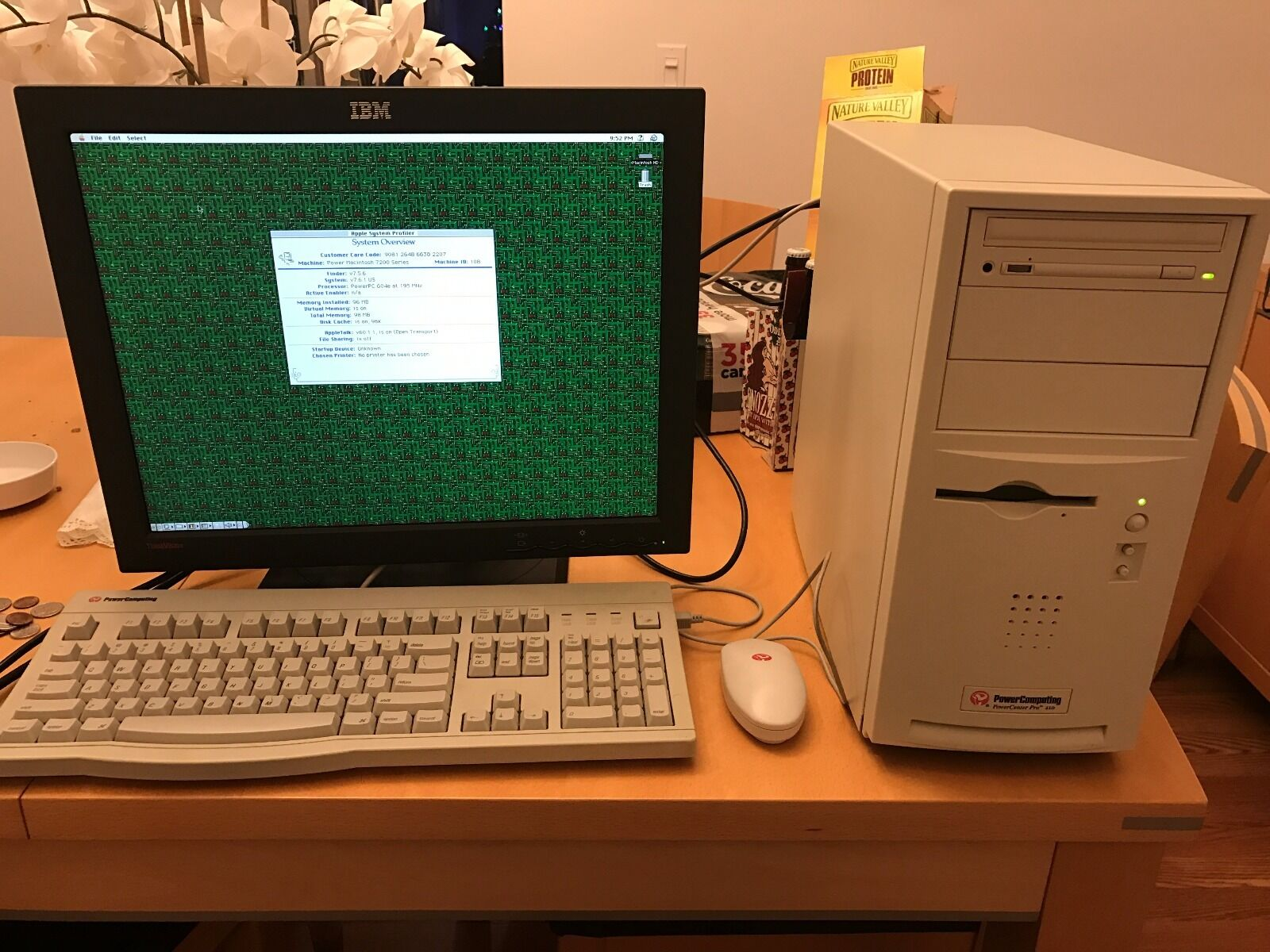
A PowerComputing PowerCenter Pro 210 running Mac OS 7.6.1

The initial clones were available in desktop and tower configurations, and were based on the PowerPC 601 80 MHz, 100 MHz and 110 MHz microprocessors. They were comparable to Apple Computer's Power Macintosh 7100 and 8100 class of computers. Pricing ranged from $1,995–2,899.

“Power Computing's system design (except for the clock-oscillator chip that controls the CPU and bus speed, the two models' motherboards are identical) suggests a thoughtful, sophisticated approach. This sophistication derives, in part, from help from Apple, as well as from the fact that two key Apple engineers recently joined Power Computing.”

Unlike Apple at the time, Power Computing pressed for direct sales. After a customer placed an order for a semi-customized configuration, the system was delivered the next day. Following the delivery of the system, Power Computing called the customer to surmise their needs and offer technical support and customer service. In addition, Power Computing set a goal of a 3-minute response time for all inquiries.

In May 1995, shortly after the original clone announcement, Power Computing teamed up with Austin, Texas based Metrowerks to offer the Power Computing CodeStation. The CodeStation was a package consisting of the recently announced Power Series clone, rebranded and bundled with the latest PowerPC version of CodeWarrior (CW6 Gold which introduced Magic Cap support). CodeStations were sold through Metrowerks at discounted developer prices and it is unknown exactly how many units were sold.

At the end of July 1995, Power Computing announced that it had successfully ramped the volume production capability of its Power 100 system. The efficiencies provided by volume production allowed Power Computing to lower the base configuration price of a "Power 100 Starter System" to $1,699. In addition, the company instigated a comprehensive quick-ship program that allowed popular configurations to ship the same day. Power Computing advertised models up to the "Power 120 XL", a $5,499 machine built around the PowerPC 601+ chip, a 2GB SCSI hard drive, 17 inch Sony monitor, 4X-speed CD-ROM, built-in Ethernet, and 32MB RAM.

At the end of October 1995, Power Computing introduced the world's fastest Macintosh-compatible computer, the PowerWave, based on the PowerPC 604 microprocessor. Per an article in the Austin American-Statesman, Power Computing said its machine would far outperform Windows-compatible machines based on Intel's Pentium processors.

At the early 1996 Macworld trade show in San Francisco, Power Computing found itself the star attraction because Apple was so preoccupied with its mounting financial woes that then-CEO Michael Spindler cancelled an appearance. PCC got another break when a computer firm that had spent $170,000 erecting an immense booth pulled out at the last moment, allowing Mr. Kahng to pick up the prime exhibiting space for $30,000.

At that Macworld, the PowerCurve — a line of mid-range, CPU-upgradeable Mac OS systems based on the PowerPC 601 and the industry-standard PCI expansion bus — was introduced. Unique to the PowerCurve 601/120 was the native support of VGA–style monitors.

=== Market success ===
In May 1996, just one year after Power Computing started selling Mac clones, the company reached the 100,000 units sold milestone. The number of employees had grown to 300. And as noted in an article in The Wall Street Journal (WSJ) by Jim Carlton, Power CEO Steve Kahng “still hasn’t taken his (golf) clubs out of the bag” (he had vowed not to play another round of his beloved golf until he had shipped the first 30,000 Mac clones).

That same WSJ article noted that one-half of Power Computings's customers represent people who would have otherwise purchased a computer from Apple. The others are people who might have bought a non-Mac computer.

There is no question Apple is losing sales to us, but we are also expanding the Mac market," says Geoff Burr, Power Computing's vice president of sales and marketing.

Still, unless Apple can rapidly expand its cloning operations -- a goal of new Apple CEO Gilbert Amelio -- to boost flagging Mac market share and generate enough new licensing and software revenue to offset sales lost to cloners, Apple could see its belated cloning campaign backfire.

In June 1996, Kahng persuaded a unit of Lockheed Martin to buy 3,000 of his computers rather than Apple's. Though a longtime Apple customer, Lockheed Martin said Power beat out Apple's bid by agreeing to such extras as loading in special engineering software before shipping the machines out, a request that Apple declined. This was the largest sale in the history of Macs or Mac-compatible computers at the time.

Kahng was able to leverage his strong relationship with IBM to get access to the fastest PowerPC processors sooner than anyone else. As a result, starting in April 1996 and continuing through 1997, Power Computing regularly put out the fastest computer system in either platform (Mac OS or WinTel).

- In April 1996, Power Computing unveiled the PowerTower, based on the 180 MHz and 166 MHz PowerPC 604 processor (announced by IBM on the same day). These were the fastest Mac OS personal computers available at the time.
- In July 1996, Power Computing was back with an even faster system – the PowerTower Pro which marked the worldwide debut of the new PowerPC 604e microprocessor featuring clock speeds of up to 225 MHz, making the PowerTower Pro the fastest personal computer available.
- In May 1997, the PowerTower Pro 250 outperformed all comparable Pentium and Pentium II class Windows-based systems that were shipping at the time.
- In August 1997, the planned but never built PowerTower Pro G3 275 and PowerTower Pro G3 250 would have been the world's first desktop systems using the new generation of PowerPC processors.

By 1997 Power Computing had reached $400 million in annual revenue, and reviews consistently rated its products as better than Apple's. At Macworld Expo 1997, the company presented a military-themed campaign that urged the Mac faithful to “Fight Back.” Power Computing employees were outfitted in camouflage. The video wall looped “why we fight” propaganda. And “Steve Says” posters, flyers and T-shirts were ubiquitous inside the Moscone Center as well as in the streets surrounding the convention center (where Power Computing-logoed Hummers, with bullhorns blazing, circled the center). Stickers and flyers featuring Steve Kahng are prominently featured in the TV show, Austin Stories.

=== Acquisition of assets by Apple ===
In early 1997 Apple indicated that it wanted much higher license revenue from clonemakers, and other conditions. In June it and Power Computing tentatively agreed to new terms. The deal was not finalized before the July 9 departure of Apple CEO Gil Amelio, and his de facto replacement Steve Jobs sought to end or greatly diminish the clone program. Jobs believed that Apple had started to license clones too late to repeat the business model pioneered by Microsoft in the early 1980s.

"Apple has to let go of this ghost and invent the future," Jobs said. Instead of expanding the share of the market that used computers based on the Macintosh system, the decision to license clones simply ate into Apple's own sales of hardware, he said.

At MacWorld Boston in August, Power Computing President Joel Kocher unsuccessfully tried to convince attendees to rally against Apple's stiff new licensing policies. He and other executives resigned soon afterwards as Power Computing's board chose to be acquired instead.

On September 2, 1997, Apple Computer bought key assets of Power Computing for more than $100 million in Apple stock and roughly $10 million in cash. As part of the deal, Apple got back the license that allowed Power Computing to sell Macintosh-based machines, also obtaining "the right to retain key employees with expertise in direct marketing, distribution, and engineering". Some of them helped created Apple's next generation of technologies like the iMac. Contrary to impressions given by some reporting and the title of Apple's own press release, Apple did not acquire Power Computing itself. Indeed, Power Computing merely emphasised the withdrawal of its license, reprinting the Apple press release, and encouraging potential buyers to hurry while stocks of its clone models remained.

The company had planned to offer Wintel clones before losing the Apple license, and announced its PowerTrip line of Wintel laptop computers. However, regulatory delays to the Apple deal, delaying receipt of the agreed funds, and lawsuits from suppliers forced the company to downsize, and with the PowerTrip line subsequently cancelled due to "lacklustre sales and manufacturing problems", the company was described as being in "dire straits", looking "to find a new way to sell, manufacture and service" and hoping to introduce a new strategy and new products in the spring of 1998.

Parts shortages forced the company to halt production in 1997, and by late January 1998, the last of Power Computing's physical assets were auctioned off. Power Computing shareholders were mailed Apple Computer shares representing their pro rata share in the now-defunct corporation.

Anyone who had a Power Computing Macintosh clone was given a free upgrade up to Mac OS 8.1 by Apple under the Power Computing name. Ironically, this made Power Computing one of two Macintosh clones to get a Mac OS 8 upgrade disk (the other was UMAX, which got it under an agreement with Apple). Apple continued to provide technical support for any Power Computing machine until December 31, 2004.

== Machine upgrades ==
Power Computing's machines were one of the most popular Macintosh clone to ever be made. Any 603 or 604 equipped Power Computing machine can officially go up to Mac OS 8.1 due to Apple providing users of Power Computing machines Mac OS 8 upgrade disks as part of the acquisition (most other Macintosh clones can only officially go up to Mac OS 7.6). However, despite officially only going up to Mac OS 8.1, any 603 or 604 equipped Power Computing machine is capable of being upgraded up to Mac OS 9.1, although this is not officially supported by Apple.

Powered by a PowerPC 603e or a 604e processor, Power Computing's machines cannot run Mac OS X natively, but with the addition of a G3 or G4 processor upgrade and the use of XPostFacto 4.0, they could run several versions of Mac OS X up to 10.4 Tiger, with some limitations.

== See also ==
- Macintosh clone
