= Adobe Premiere =

Professional video editing, special effects, and visual effects software

- Premiere Pro 2025 running on Windows 10
- Developer: Adobe
- Release: September 24, 2003; 23 years ago
- Stable release: 26.5 / September 2026
- Preview release: 27.0 / August 2026
- Operating system: Windows 10 (64-bit) version 22H2 or later or Windows 11 macOS 12 or later iOS; Android
- Predecessor: Premiere (original)
- Type: Video editing software, special effects, visual effects
- License: Trialware, Proprietary, term

Adobe Premiere (originally released in 1991 and called Adobe Premiere Pro between August 2003 and January 2026) is a video editing application developed by Adobe and distributed as part of the Adobe Creative Cloud suite. It is used for producing video content across various industries.

== History ==
=== Adobe Premiere and Premiere Pro ===
Adobe Premiere (original)
- Developers: Adobe Systems; SuperMac Technology
- Release: December 1991; 34 years ago
- Final release: 6.5 / August 2002; 24 years ago
- Operating system: Classic Mac OS; Microsoft Windows
- Successor: Adobe Premiere
- Type: Video editing software

The original version of Adobe Premiere was one of the first computer-based non-linear video editing systems. It was released on Apple Mac in 1991 and for Microsoft Windows in September 1993. The final version based on this codebase, version 6.5, was released in August 2002 for both Windows and Mac.

The software originated at SuperMac Technology under the name Reel Time, a QuickTime-based video editor developed for the company’s Video Spigot capture card. In August 1991, Adobe Systems acquired the project and rebranded it as Adobe Premiere.

Premiere was the second QuickTime-based video editor on the market. Its ability to import new video formats could be enhanced by updating to a newer, compatible version of QuickTime. However, it could only process videos and images at a maximum width of 1,024 pixels.

In August 2003, Adobe released a substantial rewrite, and called it Adobe Premiere Pro. Subsequent versions until 2026 were branded as Adobe Premiere Pro.

On January 20, 2026, along with the version 26.0 launch, Adobe rebranded Adobe Premiere Pro back to the prior name Adobe Premiere, dropping the "Pro" suffix after 23 years of use. This is the first time that Adobe Premiere has used the name without the suffix since its rebranding in 2003. The application continued to serve as Adobe's primary non-linear video editing system, and is still available to Creative Cloud users.

On September 22, 2026, Adobe Premiere became available on Android.

== Features ==
Adobe Premiere supports high-resolution video editing up to 10,240 × 8,192 pixels.

=== Workflow integration ===
Adobe Premiere supports program files from Adobe Photoshop, Adobe Illustrator, and Adobe After Effects. Adobe Premiere projects can also be imported into After Effects, and clips copied between the two applications retain most of their attributes.

Projects from Premiere Rush are compatible with Adobe Premiere, allowing for advanced editing features and use of professional-grade tools.

== Adobe Premiere family ==
The Adobe Premiere family is a group of applications and services made by Adobe Inc. for the use of professional non-linear video editing. Supported features in these applications include metadata and ingest logging, media output encoding, and more.

=== Current applications ===
- Dynamic Link is a workflow that integrates After Effects with Premiere Pro and Adobe Premiere 26.0 and the discontinued Encore. Files can be transferred between the two without re-rendering.
- Elements Organizer is a digital asset management application that accompanies Photoshop Elements and Premiere Elements, providing a central interface for managing photos and video projects.
- Adobe Media Encoder is a rendering tool used to process and export video projects. Users can tailor renders to specific platforms, enhance accessibility for broader audiences, and reduce file size.
- Premiere Elements is a scaled-down version of Premiere Pro tailored to novice editors and consumers. Its entry screen offers clip organization, editing, and auto-movie generation options. Premiere Pro project files are incompatible with those from Premiere Elements. Unlike many of its competitors, Premiere Elements can handle unlimited video and audio tracks, with multiple key-frame effects applied to each clip, as well as picture-in-picture and chroma key capabilities. It is available for Windows and macOS.
- Premiere Pro is a timeline-based video editing software application developed by Adobe Inc. and published as part of the Adobe Creative Cloud licensing program. First launched in 2003, Adobe Premiere Pro is a successor of Adobe Premiere.
- Premiere Rush is a discontinued, simplified, cross-platform video editing software application that integrates with Premiere Pro. First released in 2018, it is published by Adobe alongside Premiere Pro as part of Adobe Creative Cloud, replacing Premiere Clip for editing on mobile devices. As the name implies, Premiere Rush is aimed at short turnaround times in lieu of advanced editing tools. It was removed from Adobe Creative Cloud and app stores on September 30, 2025, and it is being replaced by a simplified version of Adobe Premiere 26.0.

== Usage in feature films ==
Adobe Premiere has been used in feature film production and is commonly used among video editors in online spaces. It is especially known for its integration with its companion application Adobe After Effects, which allowed it to become a prominent tool in the video editing space. The software is also widely recognized for its customizability, allowing for personalized organization of its modular panel design, each one serving a different purpose. Notable films edited using the software include:

Film

- Monsters (2010)
- Gone Girl (2014)
- Deadpool (2016)
- Hail, Caesar! (2016)
- A Ghost Story (2017)
- The Florida Project (2017)
- Only the Brave (2017)
- Searching (2018)
- The Old Man & the Gun (2018)
- The Ballad of Buster Scruggs (2018)
- Terminator: Dark Fate (2019)
- Mank (2020)
- The Green Knight (2021)
- Red Rocket (2021)
- The Tragedy of Macbeth (2021)
- Everything Everywhere All at Once (2022)
- Devotion (2022)
- Missing (2023)
- Somebody I Used to Know (2023)
- The Killer (2023)
- Frida (2024)
- Dìdi (2024)
- Thelma (2024)
- The Substance (2024)
- Anora (2024)
- Plainclothes (2025)
- House of Dynamite (2025)
- Train Dreams (2025)
- Obsession (2025)
- Mercy (2026)
- Union County (2026)

Television

- Mindhunter (2017-2019)
- Ramy (2019-2022)
- Wu-Tang: An American Saga (2019-2023)
- The Bear (2022-2026)
- Penelope (2024)

== Release history ==
=== Adobe Premiere (original) ===
Version	Release date	Platform	Significant changes
Adobe Premiere 1.0	December 1991	Mac	First release of Premiere; QuickTime multimedia and VideoSpigot format support; PICT image support; Supported up to 160 x 120 pixels movie creation for NTSC and 192 x 144 pixels for PAL; Supported 8-bit audio; Supported output to videotape
Adobe Premiere 2.0	September 1992	Mac	QuickTime video and audio capture support; Title creation; Title, Sequence, and Construction windows; Slow/fast motion support; 5 audio and 41 movie/still-image filters; 49 special effects; 16-bit, 44 kHz audio support; Filmstrip file format introduced; Numbered PICT sequence support; EDL (Edit decision list) support; Adobe Illustrator text import; SMPTE timecode support
Adobe Premiere 3.0	August 1993	Mac	99 stereo audio tracks; 97 video tracks; Video waveform monitor; Sub-pixel motion and field rendering; Batch digitizing; Full framerate preview from disk; Enhanced title window
Adobe Premiere 1.0	September 1993	Windows	First release of Premiere for Windows; 24-bit AVI and QuickTime video format support; Autodesk Animator file support; AVI, AIFF, and WAV audio format support; Still image support (Photoshop, BMP, DIB, PCX, PICT, PCX, and TIFF formats); Two video tracks, three audio tracks, and one transition and superimpose track; No EDL, titling, and motion and device control available in the current Mac (v3.0) release
Adobe Premiere 1.1	February 1994	Windows	AdobeCap video capture module; Expanded graphics and audio file support; TARGA and ADPCM file support; Image sequence import support
Adobe Premiere 4.0	July 1994	Mac	Support for 97 superimposition tracks plus two A/B tracks; Trim window; Dynamic previewing; Custom filter and transition creation; Time variable filters; Batch capture; Time-lapse capture; NTSC 29.97 frame rate support
Adobe Premiere 4.0	December 1994	Windows	Adobe directly moved the Windows platform release of Premiere from v1.1 to v4.0; Matches capabilities of Premiere 4.0 for Macintosh
Adobe Premiere 4.2	October 1995	Mac	CD-ROM Movie Maker Plug-in; Data rate analysis tool; Power Macintosh-native Sound Manager 3.1
Adobe Premiere 4.2	April 1996	Windows	32-bit architecture; Long File Names support; Background compiling; Batch movie maker; 4K output support; Right-mouse button support; Uninstaller utility
Adobe Premiere 4.2 for Silicon Graphics	July 1997	UNIX/SGI	SGI O2 platform exclusive release; IRIX 6.3 integration; OpenGL accelerated versions of transition and special effects plug-ins; Platform-specific plug-ins by Silicon Graphics for combining 3D and video content
Adobe Premiere 5.0	May 1998	Windows and Mac	Source/Program editing; Title window editor; Keyframeable audio and video filters; Collapsible tracks; Up to three hour project length support
Adobe Premiere 5.1	October 1998	Windows and Mac	QuickTime 3.0 support; DPS (Data Processing System) Perception support; Preview to RAM; "Smart" Preview file Timeline export; Multi-threaded, dual processor support
Adobe Premiere 6.0	January 2001	Windows and Mac	Support for web video and DV formats; OHCI (IEEE 1394 (FireWire)) support; Title editor; Storyboard; Audio mixer; Timeline video track keyframes
Adobe Premiere 6.5	August 2002	Windows and Mac	Real-time preview; Adobe Title Designer; Exporting to DVD as MPEG-2

=== Adobe Premiere Pro and Adobe Premiere ===
Version	Release date	Icon	Platform	Significant changes
Premiere Pro 1.0 (Premiere Pro CS, Adobe Premiere 7.0)	August 21, 2003		Windows	Full rewrite of code; Deep nest of timelines; New Color Correctors; Sample-level audio editing; Audio effects on tracks; 5.1 Audio; VST Audio; Initial Advanced Authoring Format (AAF) support; Editable keyboard shortcuts; Adobe Media Encoder
Premiere Pro 1.5 / CS1	April 2004		Windows	Support for all Standard HD resolutions; Support for Panasonic 24p advanced; Support for Bezier Keyframes; Added four filters: Auto Levels, Auto Color, Auto Contrast, and Shadows and Highlights; Added 2 audio filters: DeHummer and DeEsser; Added custom presets; Added Snap on Sample feature; Tighter integration with other Adobe products
Premiere Pro 2.0 / CS2	January 17, 2006		Windows	Added support for HDV, HD, and Flash Video; Added Clip Notes, using PDF to review and approve video content; Integration with Adobe After Effects 7.0, Adobe Photoshop CS2, Adobe Encore DVD 2.0, and newly made Adobe Bridge
Premiere Pro CS3	2007		Windows and Mac (Intel only)	
Premiere Pro CS4	2008		Windows and Mac	Last version to support Windows XP and Mac OS X Tiger.
Premiere Pro CS5	2010		Windows and Mac	Initial support of Nvidia CUDA accelerated effects
Premiere Pro CS5.5	2011		Windows and Mac	Expanded RED support
Premiere Pro CS6	2012		Windows and Mac	Warp Stabilizer
Premiere Pro CC 2013	2013		Windows and Mac	
Premiere Pro CC 2014	2014		Windows and Mac	
Premiere Pro CC 2015	2015		Windows and Mac	Icon change
Premiere Pro CC 2017 (11.0)	2016		Windows and Mac	Removal of Title Menu and Title Templates; replaced with Legacy Title function; Essential Graphics introduced
Premiere Pro CC 2018 (12.0)	October 19, 2017		Windows and Mac	
Premiere Pro CC 2019 (13.0)	October 15, 2018		Windows and Mac	Selective color grading; Display color management; Intelligent audio cleanup; Add, rename, and edit Lumetri instances; Premiere Rush files editable in Premiere Pro; Edit and transform vector graphics; Essential Graphics and Motion Graphics template enhancements; Better integration with other Adobe programs and functions; Performance enhancement and new file format support, including Australian closed-captioning standard; New home screen; Auto-save improvements; Quick timecode entry
Premiere Pro CC 2020 (14.0)	November 4, 2019		Windows and Mac	Auto Reframe, feature that uses artificial intelligence to reframe videos for square or vertical aspect ratios; Time remapping maximum is increased to 20,000% without the need for nesting sequences; Ability to export HDR content with HDR10 metadata
Premiere Pro CC 2021 (15.0)	March 10, 2021		Windows and Mac	Native support for Apple silicon.
Premiere Pro CC 2022 (22.0)	October 26, 2021		Windows and Mac	New workspace, enhanced proxy workflow, and improved Apple M1 System
Premiere Pro CC 2022 (22.2)	February 8, 2022		Windows and Mac	Improved Remix tool, GPU acceleration for more effects, and workflow enhancements
Premiere Pro 2023 (23.0)	October 18, 2022		Windows and Mac	Enhanced masking tools with new color visualization; Faster export times with improved hardware acceleration; Improved sequence locking in Team Projects; Upgraded speech-to-text for 18 languages
Premiere Pro 2024 (24.0)	October 10, 2023		Windows and Mac	Text-Based Editing: Select, cut, and trim directly from transcript; Enhanced Lumetri Color interface; Automatic tone mapping for HDR workflows; Background auto-save and smoother playback
Premiere Pro 2025 (25.0)	October 2024		Windows and Mac	AI-powered timeline suggestions using Adobe Sensei; Real-time collaborative editing enhancements; Native support for AV1 hardware decoding; Smart audio ducking with dynamic voice detection
Adobe Premiere 2026 (26.0)	January 2026		Windows, macOS, iPadOS, iOS, Android	Automatic Object Masks; Redesigned, faster shape masks; Deeper Frame.io V4 integration

== See also ==
- Adobe Premiere Elements
- Adobe After Effects
- Adobe Creative Suite
- Creative Cloud controversy
- List of video editing software
- Comparison of video editing software
