= MaxxBoxx =

MaxxBoxx is the name of a line of Macintosh clones produced by MaxxBoxx DataSystems in Germany from July, 1997. The early various models featured single 180-333 MHz PowerPC 604e CPUs all the way up to quad 200 MHz versions and multiple media drive bays for easy expansion. Now MaxxBoxx DataSystems is producing professional high end computers for video editing under Windows and Macintosh.

== Models ==
Name	Clock speed	Processor
Nitro 860/200	PowerPC 604e	200 MHz
Nitro 860/225	PowerPC 604e	225 MHz
Nitro 860/360 MP	PowerPC 604e (2)	180 MHz
Nitro 860/400 MP	PowerPC 604e (2)	200 MHz
Mocca 930/233	PowerPC 604e	200 MHz
Mocca 930/266	PowerPC 604e	266 MHz
Mocca 930/333	PowerPC 604e	333 MHz
Tsunami 960/200	PowerPC 604e	200 MHz
Tsunami 960/225	PowerPC 604e	225 MHz
Tsunami 960/360 MP	PowerPC 604e (2)	180 MHz
Tsunami 960/400 MP	PowerPC 604e (2)	200 MHz
Tsunami 960/800 MP	PowerPC 604e (4)	200 MHz
Samurai Cut 920/2.67	Intel i7	2.67 GHz
Samurai ProCut 5420/2.5	Intel Quad XEON (8)	2.5 GHz
