= Emulation on the Amiga =

The Amiga computer can be used to emulate several other computer platforms, including legacy platforms such as the Commodore 64, and its contemporary rivals such as the IBM PC and the Macintosh.

== MS-DOS on Amiga via Sidecar or Bridgeboard ==
MS-DOS compatibility was a major issue during the early years of the Amiga's lifespan in order to promote the machine as a serious business machine. In order to run the MS-DOS operating system, Commodore released the Sidecar for the Amiga 1000, basically an 8088 board in a closed case that connected to the side of the Amiga. Clever programming (a library named Janus, after the two-faced Roman god of doorways) made it possible to run PC software in an Amiga window without use of emulation. At the introduction of the Sidecar the crowd was stunned to see the MS-DOS version of Microsoft Flight Simulator running at full speed in an Amiga window on the Workbench.

Later the Sidecar was implemented on an expansion card named "Bridgeboard" and was released as the A2088XT for Amiga 2000+ models. Bridgeboard models based on the Intel 80286 and 80386 CPUs were later released by Commodore as the A2286 and A2386. The Bridgeboard card and the Janus library made the use of PC expansion cards and harddisk/floppydisk drives possible. Later third party cards also appeared for the Amiga 500 and Amiga 600 expansion slot such as the KCS Powerboard, and Vortex released full-length cards for the Amiga 2000+ based on the 80386 and 80486 CPUs called the Golden Gate.

Eventually, full-software emulators, such as PC-Task and PCx allowed Amigas to run MS-DOS programs, including Microsoft Windows, without additional hardware, at the cost of speed and compatibility.

== The KCS PowerPC board ==
Dutch Amiga Kolff Computer Supplies built a similar expansion for the A500. It was later improved so it could emulate VGA, but it did not multitask.

== Amiga Transformer ==
When Commodore introduced the Amiga 1000 in July 1985 it also unexpectedly announced a software-based IBM PC emulator for it. The company demonstrated the emulator by booting IBM PC DOS and running Lotus 1-2-3. Some who attended the demonstration were skeptical that the emulator, while impressive technically, could run with acceptable performance. The application, called Transformer, was indeed extremely slow; the 'Landmark' benchmark rated it as a 300 kHz, far slower than the 4.7 MHz of IBM's oldest and slowest PC. In addition, it would only run on Amigas using the 68000 microprocessor, and would not run if the Amiga had more than 512K of RAM.

== PCTask ==
PCTask is a software PC emulator emulating PC Intel hardware with 8088 processor and CGA graphic modes. The latest version of it (4.4) was capable to emulate an 80386 clocked at 12 MHz and features include support for up to 16 MiB RAM (15 MB extended) under MS-DOS, up to two floppy drives and two hard drives. The emulator could make use of hardfile devices and then it could handle multiple hard disk files and hard disk partitions. It supported high Density floppies and CD-ROM if the Amiga hardware had mounted those devices.

The graphics mode available were MDA, CGA, EGA, VGA and SVGA emulating Hercules graphic cards with 512 KiB to 2 MiB RAM, and up to 256 colors on Amiga AGA machines, and could make use of Amiga graphic boards (e.g. Cybergraphics, EGS Spectrum, Picasso).

Parallel, Serial and PC speaker emulation, and mouse support, including serial mouse emulation were also granted.

If the Amiga hardware is fast enough (68060 or PPC) and has enough RAM, there could be also the possibility to run multiple PC-Task processes on the same machine, run MS-DOS applications in an Amiga window on a public screen (e.g. on Amiga Workbench GUI).

PCTask could also transfer files between Amiga side and the emulated MS-DOS machine; it could make use of GoldenGate bridge cards which allow the Amiga equipped with expansion slots to get complete control of its silent ISA slots and use PC-ISA cards. And latest version of it (4.4) could run even Microsoft Windows up to 95.

PCTask has an 8088/80286/80486 JITM (Just in Time Machine) capable to map all instructions of these processors, but require 4 megabytes extra of RAM for activating this feature.

PcTask has been re-released as freeware by its author.

== Mac OS on Amiga ==
History

Also introduced for the Amiga were two products, A-Max (both internal and external models) and the Emplant expansion card. Both allowed the Amiga to emulate an Apple Macintosh and run the classic Mac OS. It required an Apple Macintosh ROM image, or actual ROMs in the case of A-Max, which needed to be obtained from a real Macintosh. The user needed to own the real Macintosh or Mac ROMs to legally run the emulator.

In 1988 the first Apple Mac emulator, A-Max, was released as an external device for any Amiga. It needed Mac ROMs to function, and could read Mac disks when used with a Mac floppy drive (Amiga floppy drives are unable to read Mac disks, and unlike Amiga disks Mac floppy disks spin at variable speeds, much like CD-ROM drives). It wasn't a particularly elegant solution, but it did provide an affordable and usable Mac experience.

ReadySoft, makers of A-Max, followed up with A-Max II in the early 1990s. A-Max II was contained on a Zorro-compatible card and allowed the user, again using actual Mac ROMs, to emulate a color Macintosh. In fact, an Amiga 3000 emulating a Mac via A-Max II was significantly faster than the first consumer color Mac, the LC.

Over the time full-software virtualization was available, but a ROM image was still necessary. Example virtualization software include ShapeShifter (not to be confused with the third party preference pane ShapeShifter), later superseded by Basilisk II (both by the same programmer who conceived SheepShaver, Christian Bauer), Fusion and iFusion (the latter ran classic Mac OS by using a PowerPC "coprocessor" accelerator card). Virtual machines can provide approximately equal CPU performance as a Macintosh with the same processor, however, the framebuffer must be emulated and remains slower than a physical machine.

Although Amigas were very successful at emulating Macintoshes, it was never considered to be a Macintosh clone as it could not use Mac OS as a primary operating system.

Modern Amigas like AmigaOne and Pegasos can emulate Macintosh machines by using Basilisk II or Mac-on-Linux.

== 8-bit Commodore computers ==
Various Commodore 64 emulators were produced for the Amiga. In 1988 Compute! reviewed ReadySoft's The 64 Emulator and Software Insight Systems' GO-64 and reported mixed results with both. Although the magazine used copies of the genuine 64 ROMs, it found that some software such as SpeedScript did not run, and both emulators' performance was inferior to the real computer. Others included MagiC64 and A64.

There is an Amiga version of VICE, which emulates 8-bit commodore computers.

== Apple II ==
One Apple II emulator for the Amiga was Kevin Kralian's Apple 2000. Given that the Amiga's base 8 MHz 68000 CPU struggled to emulate the 1 MHz 6502, Apple 2000 was written in assembly language for the 68020+ CPU to actually be able to emulate an Apple II at full speed. It was revised a few times until v1.3 which was released in 1994. At the time it was released, people on the internet speculated it was part of the Emplant emulation solution, but in fact Apple 2000 was an independent project. A particularly interesting feature of the software was that it could run Apple II binaries extracted as independent program files, but also disk images which had been compressed with Dalton's Disk Disintegrator, a popular disk compression tool from the 1980s. While Apple 2000 was closed source at the time of its release, it was made open source under the MIT license in 2018.

== Atari ST ==
In the past there were produced various software based Atari emulators for the Amiga such as Amtari, or Medusa emulator.

AmigaOS 4 and MorphOS can emulate Atari ST and Atari STE platforms by using Hatari free software emulator which was released under GPL.

== Amiga emulation ==
PowerPC-equipped computers running AmigaOS 4 can run UAE to emulate a Motorola 68000-equipped Amiga. Original Kickstart 3.1 ROM images are included with AmigaOS 4.1 Update 4.
