= Spectre GCR =

Atari ST hardware/software package

The Spectre GCR is a hardware and software package for the Atari ST computers. The hardware consists of a cartridge plugging into the Atari ST's cartridge port and a cable connecting the cartridge and one of the floppy ports on the ST. Designed by David Small and sold through his company Gadgets by Small, it allows the Atari ST to run most Macintosh software. It is Small's third Macintosh emulator for the ST, replacing his previous Magic Sac and Spectre 128.

Data Pacific originally planned to sell Magic Sac as MacCartridge, a complete product incorporating the Apple Macintosh ROMs, but after Apple legal threats, the company instead sold the product without ROMs. Although Apple representatives asserted that obtaining ROMs was impossible, Apple dealers in the UK—where the product was sold as McEmulator—indicated that the ROMs were readily available to anyone in the Apple parts catalogue. As of 1989, an ST with Apple ROMs and a product like Magic Sac or Spectre was the only legal Macintosh clone.

The Spectre GCR requires the owner to provide official Apple Macintosh 128K ROMs and Macintosh Operating System 6.0.8 disks. This avoids any legal issues of copying Apple's software. The emulator runs best with a high-resolution monochrome monitor, such as Atari's own SM124, but will run on color displays by either displaying a user-selectable half of the Macintosh screen, or missing out alternate lines to fit the lower resolution color display. The Spectre GCR plugs into the cartridge slot and floppy port, and modifies the frequency of the data to/from the single-speed floppy drive of the Atari ST, allowing it to read Macintosh GCR format disks, which require a multi-speed floppy drive.

The manual claims the speed to be 20% faster than an actual Mac Plus with a 30% larger screen area and resolution. Although Spectre GCR runs in 1MB of memory, 2MB or more is recommended.

== Reception ==
Nick Walker of Personal Computer World said in January 1987 that McEmulator "not only works, it runs software 20 per cent faster than the Macintosh." He added that "it isn't very compatible;" however, "When using any application, you get the unnerving feeling that it's just about to crash". Walker advised customers to be skeptical of Data Pacific's official list of compatible software ("To be classed as a compatible product, it seems that a package has to be capable of five minutes' operation without crashing"). He concluded, "I'm amazed that the McEmulator functions at all. In its present form, I couldn't recommend it to anyone who wants to do serious work." After discussing the Macintosh II's incompatibility with older software that violates Apple software guidelines, Jerry Pournelle in October 1987 wrote in BYTE that Magic Sac was a good test: "If software runs on Magic Sac, it will run on the Mac, Mac II, and anything else that enforces those standards."
