= Psystar Corporation =

American computer company

- Industry: Computer hardware; Computer software; Consumer electronics
- Defunct: May 14, 2012; 14 years ago
- Fate: Dissolved
- Headquarters: Doral, Florida, USA

Psystar Corporation was a company based in Miami, Florida, owned by Rudy and Robert Pedraza who sold "Open Computers" though one article claimed "Psystar, run by HyperMegaNet, based in Wolfsburg, Germany, currently ships to 23 destinations including the UK via delivery firm DHL."

These computers, first announced in April 2008, had the option of being pre-installed with Mac OS X Leopard, making them the first commercially distributed "hackintosh" computers. In November 2009, a U.S. Federal District Court ruled Psystar violated Apple's copyrights in doing so. Some of Apple's "trade secrets" officially entered into public view as a result of the lawsuit in January 2012.

== Open computers ==
Psystar's computers were initially called "OpenMac" but were later renamed "Open Computers." The units sold can run different operating systems but the company chose to install Mac OS X from a copy bought from Apple. It was revealed that Psystar installed this on a Mac Mini and copied it to a non-Apple computer used as an imaging station, which created the master image of the operating system using Psystar's bootloader and kernel extensions. This image was reproduced and installed on OpenComputer units. The Mac Mini was also used to download Mac OS X updates that were ported to OpenComputer machines.

== Rebel EFI ==
In October 2009, Psystar released an EFI boot disk in its web store. The Rebel EFI was a shareware product that included a modified bootloader bundled with other software tools that allow users to install Mac OS X to any PC-based machine. The Rebel EFI was not an original work of Psystar, but was based on the Apple open source program Boot-132, in violation of its license. It was further speculated to be a custom build of Chameleon from the OSx86 Project.

== Early concerns ==
Early efforts to research Psystar shortly after their announcement of a Mac clone in April 2008 resulted in questions regarding the company's very existence and just how legitimate they were. Several addresses were provided (five in four days) and Psystar was taking credit card numbers but not processing them because their processing company, Powerpay, had revoked Psystar's account "for three primary reasons: product/services not as represented in application, sales volumes grossly exceeded, no address verification utilized"; and there were claims that their website had malware on it.

The developers of the OSx86 Project claimed that Psystar did not get permission to use their code and then reworked their license so that it specifically forbids commercial usage.

As part of Apple's discovery process it was revealed that in 2008 Psystar presented a slide presentation in hope of raising $24 million from investors. "Under its conservative projections, Psystar told investors it would sell 70,000 computers in 2009, 470,000 systems in 2010, and 1.45 million machines in 2011. The firm's aggressive growth model, however, put those numbers at 130,000, 1.87 million, and 12 million during 2009, 2010, and 2011, respectively."

However, the reality was quite different. "Psystar produced incomplete financial records," Dr. Matthew Lynde, who works as an economics consultant for Cornerstone Research, said in a declaration during trial. After digging through invoices, purchase orders and other documents, Lynde was able to pinpoint only 768 sales of machines with Mac OS X pre-installed. Psystar did not challenge Lynde in his analysis of financial records.

== Legal issues ==
The end-user license agreement (EULA) for Mac OS X forbids third-party installations of Mac OS X, and Psystar's Mac clone is in violation of that agreement. However, Psystar argues that Apple's prohibition against third-party installations will not hold up in court: "What if Honda said that, after you buy their car, you could only drive it on the roads they said you could?" Psystar says it will continue to sell the Open system, adding "We're not breaking any laws."

On July 3, 2008, Apple filed a lawsuit against Psystar in the District Court of Northern California.

On August 28, 2008, Psystar Corporation responded to Apple's claims of copyright infringement, and also countersued Apple for anti-competitive practices, monopolistic behavior, and copyright misuse. This countersuit was dismissed on November 18, 2008.

On November 27, 2008, Apple claimed "Psystar violated the Digital Millennium Copyright Act (DMCA) by dodging copy-protection technologies Apple uses to protect Mac OS X." "Apple employs technological protection measures that effectively control access to Apple's copyrighted works," the revised complaint read. "Defendant has illegally circumvented Apple's technological copyright-protection measures. [...] Specifically, Apple charged Psystar with acquiring or creating "code" that "avoids, bypasses, removes, descrambles, decrypts, deactivates or impairs a technological protection measure without Apple's authority for the purpose of gaining unauthorized access to Apple's copyrighted works." This brief revealed that Apple uses methods it considers protected by the DMCA to prevent Mac OS X from being installed on non-Apple hardware.

On December 22, 2008, Psystar opened the claim that Apple "is prohibited from bringing action against Psystar for the alleged infringement of one or more of the plaintiff's copyrights for failure to register said copyrights with the copyright office as required" by law.

On February 5, 2009, Psystar won a round as a modified abuse of copyright claim against Apple under Judge William Alsup, opening the door to a potential nullification of the Apple-only hardware rule in Apple's EULA.

In April 2009, Apple alleged that Psystar was withholding financial information relating to their company and that "at the deposition regarding Psystar's revenues, profits, assets, and liabilities (including investors, lenders, or other sources of financial support), taken on March 20, 2009, Psystar's CEO and founder Rudy Pedraza, the person designated by Psystar to testify on this topic, would not answer basic questions about Psystar's financials." Psystar countered that they have never produced monthly, quarterly, or yearly statements, that they lost some documents when moving premises, and that they have produced the requested information where available.

On May 26, 2009, Psystar filed for Chapter 11 bankruptcy. Regardless, the company continued to sell their computers with Apple's Mac OS X installed on them. Apple challenged that Psystar was using Chapter 11 bankruptcy to stall the case, and in June 2009, the court lifted the stay on Apple's lawsuit.

On July 2, 2009, Psystar announced that they would emerge from Chapter 11 protection.

As of August 12, 2009, debtor Psystar's bankruptcy was dismissed with prejudice with stipulations by Florida Judge Mark that no Chapter 11 bankruptcy can be filed for 12 months and that there will be no stay of any pending cases if Psystar seeks Chapter 7 bankruptcy. "One effect of the judge's orders is that Psystar won't be able to use bankruptcy as a stall tactic against Apple—that trial is set to begin in January. But the other effect of the order is that Psystar can be sued by its creditors. 'All of Psystar's creditors are now free to sue in any court of competent jurisdiction to get their debts paid,' an attorney familiar with bankruptcy told The Mac Observer. That includes Apple, which Psystar may owe for copies of Mac OS X it bought from the company."

On August 20, 2009, California Judge Alsup ordered Psystar to pay $5,000 of Apple's legal fees.

On October 8, 2009, the court ruled that Psystar was not entitled to Apple's profit margin data.

On November 13, 2009, the court granted Apple's motion for summary judgement and found Apple's copyrights were violated as well as the Digital Millennium Copyright Act (DMCA) when Psystar installed Apple's operating system on non-Apple computers. A hearing on remedies was set for December 14.

On December 1, 2009, Psystar agreed to pay Apple $2.7 million for copyright infringement, breach of contract, violation of the Digital Millennium Copyright Act, additional damages and attorneys fees in the California lawsuit. The payments were deferred until all Psystar's appeals are exhausted.

On December 15, 2009, the judge in the California action issued a permanent injunction barring Psystar from manufacturing, distributing, or assisting anyone with any sort of device or technology "that is primarily designed or produced for the purpose of circumventing a technological measure". The ruling applies to all current and future versions of Mac OS X and Judge Alsup made it clear that "Psystar will be selling Rebel EFI at its peril, and risks finding itself held in contempt if its new venture falls within the scope of the injunction." The ruling also requires Psystar to destroy all of its equipment and material that it used in the circumvention of Apple technologies by December 31.

On January 16, 2010, Psystar announced that they would be appealing the lawsuit put in place on December 15.

As of August 2010, Psystar's web site, store, and content delivery network are unreachable.

On May 14, 2012, the US Supreme Court declined to hear Psystar's appeal.

== See also ==
- Macintosh clone
- IMessage#Unofficial_platforms
