= Motorola StarMax =

Line of PowerPC Macintosh clones produced by Motorola

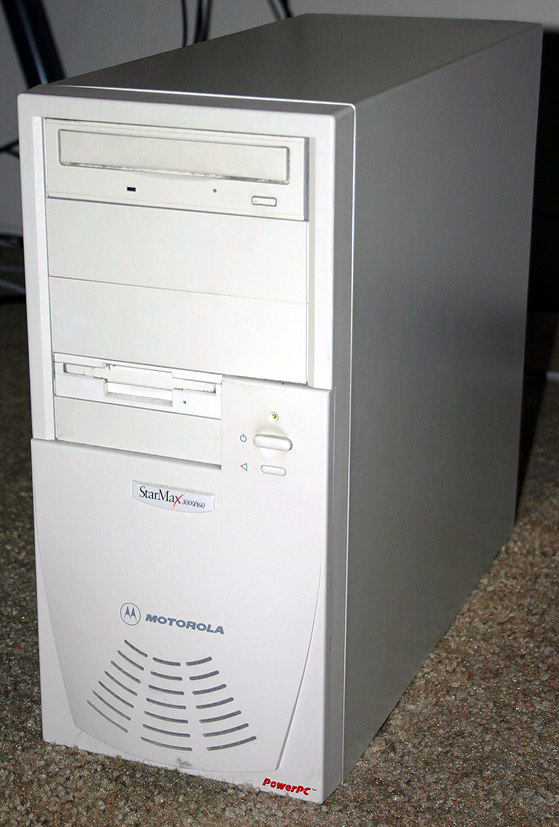
A Motorola StarMax 3000/160MT

The Motorola StarMax was a line of licensed Macintosh clones produced by Motorola Information Systems Group in 1996 and 1997. They used versions of Apple's Tanzania motherboard, which was designed to use standard IBM PC compatible components in addition to Apple-proprietary components then in common use in the Power Macintosh family. StarMax computers featured SVGA video ports rather than the proprietary port Apple used at the time, and PS/2 mouse and keyboard ports in addition to ADB. The motherboard was also capable of using manual-eject floppy drives, though Motorola disabled this functionality and shipped the computers with software-eject drives.

The StarMax line was discontinued on 11 September 1997 after Apple terminated the Macintosh clone license program that year. The StarMax's termination resulted in strained relations between Motorola and Apple and later Motorola's expulsion from the AIM alliance.

== Licensing ==
Shortly after Gil Amelio was appointed CEO of Apple in February 1996, Motorola Computer Group acquired a license for Mac OS 7.5 to ship with its own computer systems that it plan to release in China later that year. The license also allowed Motorola to sub-license Mac OS to its customers along with motherboards it would sell as OEM. Ultimately Apple terminated the license in 1997.

Reportedly, a heated telephone conversation between Jobs and Motorola CEO Christopher Galvin resulted in the contentious termination of Motorola's clone contract, and the long-favored Apple being demoted to "just another customer" mainly for PowerPC CPUs. Apple later expelled Motorola from the AIM alliance as retaliation, leaving IBM to make all future PowerPC CPUs.

== Product line ==
The StarMax was sold in four different product lines. In addition, the StarMax 6000 was based on the PowerPC 750 processor, but was never shipped due to the termination of the Macintosh clone program. The StarMax 6000 would have been the first CHRP machine and the first machine with the PowerPC G3 months before Apple released the Power Macintosh G3.

StarMax models numbers were derived using a standard system: (product line)/(CPU speed)(case type)

- product line was 3000, 4000, 5000, or 5500 and designated the CPU used in the machine
  - 3000 and 5000 used PowerPC 603e processors.
  - 4000 and 5500 used PowerPC 604e processors.
- cpu speed was the processor's clock speed, in megahertz
- case type was either DT or MT and designated the type of case used
  - DT was a desktop case suitable for placing under a monitor
  - MT was a minitower case

5000 and 5500 models used an upgraded "Tanzania II" logic board featuring faster system bus speeds and improved integrated graphics based on the ATI 3D RAGE II+ chip.
