= Macintosh clone =

Computer running Mac OS not produced by Apple

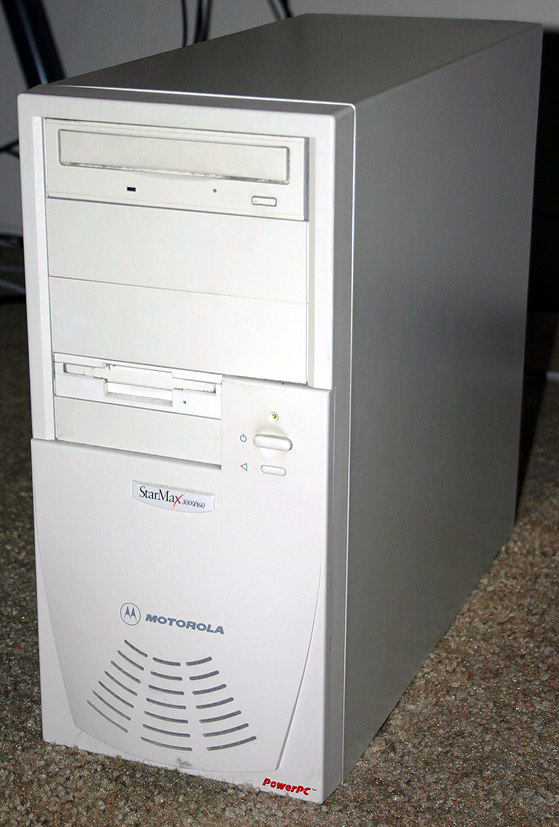
The StarMax 3000/160MT, a Macintosh clone manufactured by Motorola

A Macintosh clone is a computer running the Classic Mac OS operating system that was not produced by Apple Inc. The earliest Mac clones were based on emulators and reverse-engineered Macintosh ROMs. During Apple's short-lived Mac OS 7 licensing program, authorized Mac clone makers were able to either purchase 100% compatible motherboards or build their own using reference designs licensed from Apple.

During Apple's switch to the Intel platform, many non-Apple Wintel/PC computers were technologically so similar to Mac computers that they were able to boot the Mac operating system using various combinations of community-developed patches and hacks. Such a Wintel/PC computer running macOS is more commonly referred to as a Hackintosh. Apple's transition to Apple silicon made Mac clones considerably harder.

== Background ==
The Apple II and IBM PC computer lines were "cloned" by other manufacturers who had reverse-engineered the minimal amount of firmware in the computers' ROM chips and subsequently legally produced computers that could run the same software. These clones were seen by Apple as a threat, as Apple II sales had presumably suffered from the competition provided by Franklin Computer Corporation and other clone manufacturers, both legal and illegal. At IBM, the threat proved to be real: most of the market eventually went to clone-makers, including Compaq, Leading Edge, Tandy, Kaypro, Packard Bell, Amstrad in Europe, and dozens of smaller companies, and in short order IBM found it had lost control over its own platform.

Apple eventually licensed the Apple II ROMs to other companies, primarily to educational toy manufacturer Tiger Electronics in order to produce an inexpensive laptop with educational games and the AppleWorks software suite: the Tiger Learning Computer (TLC). The TLC lacked a built-in display. Its lid acted as a holster for the cartridges that stored the bundled software, as it had no floppy drive.

== Emulators ==
As of 1989, the only legal Macintosh clone was an Atari ST with Mac ROMs. The ST can emulate a Mac by adding the third-party Magic Sac emulator, released in 1985, and, later, the Spectre, Spectre GCR, and Aladin emulators. The first three of those emulators requires that the user obtain a set of Mac ROMs sold as system upgrades to Macintosh users. Later, multiple emulators were released for the Amiga.

Starting with the sales of the Power Macintosh line in 1994, a CPU emulator to run 68000 applications was built into the Mac OS. By the time 68060 processors were available, PowerPC Macs became so powerful that they ran 68000 applications faster than any 68000-based computer, including any Amiga, Atari ST, and X68000.

Connectix also released another 68k emulator for Macs, replacing the original, called Speed Doubler, supposedly reported to be even faster than Apple's. As the years went by, the emulator was not updated to work with later versions of the original Mac OS, however, supposedly because Apple's own 68k emulator eventually surpassed it in performance, and the OS itself relied further on native PowerPC code with each new Mac OS update.

There was also a software emulator for x86 platforms running DOS/Windows and Linux called Executor, from ARDI. ARDI reverse-engineered the Mac ROM and built a 68000 CPU emulator, enabling Executor to run most (but not all) Mac software, from System 5 to System 7, with good speed. The migration from 68000 to PowerPC, and the added difficulties of emulating a PowerPC on x86 platforms, made targeting the later Mac OS versions impractical.

== Unlicensed clones ==
Wary of repeating history and wanting to retain tight control of its product, Apple's Macintosh strategy included technical and legal measures that rendered production of Mac clones problematic. The original Macintosh system software contained a very large amount of complex code, which embodied the Mac's entire set of APIs, including the use of the GUI and file system. Through the 1980s and into the 1990s, much of the system software was included in the Macintosh's physical ROM chips. Therefore, any competitor attempting to create a Macintosh clone without infringing copyright would have to reverse-engineer the ROMs, which would have been an enormous and costly process without certainty of success. Only one company, Nutek, managed to produce "semi-Mac-compatible" computers in the early 1990s by partially re-implementing System 7 ROMs.

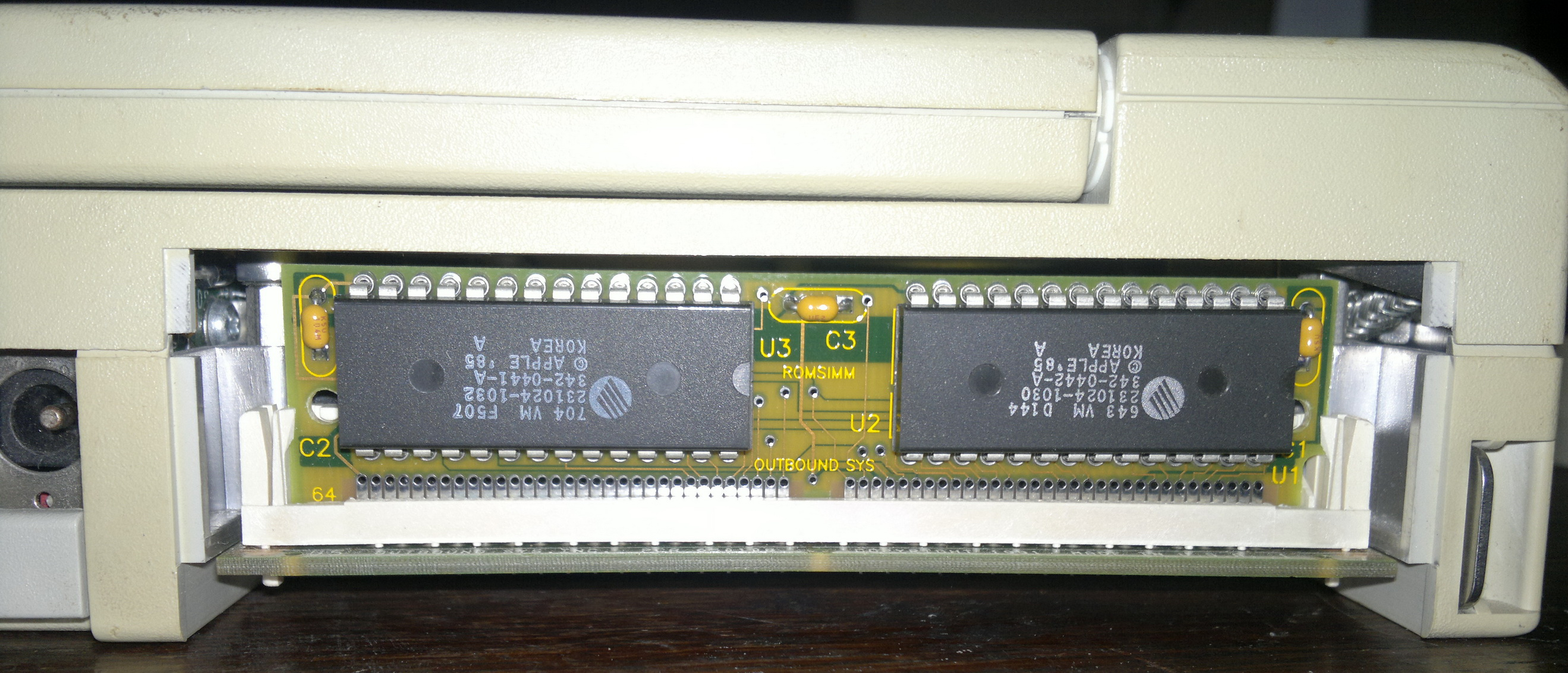
Mac ROM was used in the Outbound Notebook. The Mac ROM stick is shown removed, revealing the RAM slots.

This strategy, making the development of competitive Mac clones prohibitively expensive, successfully shut out manufacturers looking to create computers that would directly compete with Apple's product lines. However, companies like Outbound Systems, Dynamac and Colby Systems, were able to sidestep the Mac cloning process by targeting high-end, high-profit market segments without suitable product offerings from Apple and offering Mac conversions instead.

In the early 1980s, Brazil's military dictatorship instituted trade restrictions that prohibited the importation of computers from overseas manufacturers, and these restrictions were not lifted until 1993. A Brazilian company called Unitron (which had previously produced Apple II clones) developed a Macintosh clone with specifications similar to the Mac 512K, and proposed to put it on sale. Although Unitron claimed to have legitimately reverse-engineered the ROMs and hardware, and Apple did not hold patents covering the computer in Brazil, Apple claimed the ROMs had simply been copied. Ultimately, under pressure from the US government and local manufacturers of PC clones the Brazilian Computer and Automation Council did not allow production to proceed.

=== Hackintosh ===
When Apple migrated to the PC-Intel platform in the mid-2000s, Apple hardware was more or less the same as generic PC hardware from a platform perspective. This theoretically allowed for installation of Mac OS X on non-Apple hardware. Hackintosh is the term appropriated by hobbyist programmers, who have collaborated on the Internet to install versions of Mac OS X v10.4 onwards – dubbed Mac OSx86 – to be used on generic PC hardware rather than on Apple's own hardware. Apple contends this is illegal under the DMCA, so in order to combat illegal usage of their operating system software, they continue to use methods to prevent Mac OS X (now macOS) from being installed on unofficial non-Apple hardware, with mixed success. At present, with proper knowledge and instruction, macOS installation is more or less straightforward. Several online communities have sprung up to support end-users who wish to install macOS on non-Apple hardware. Some representative examples of these are Dortania and InsanelyMac.

=== Psystar Corporation ===
In April 2008, Psystar Corporation based in Miami, Florida, announced the first commercially available OSx86, a Wintel/PC computer with Mac OS X Leopard pre-installed partially with software from the OSx86 community project. Apple immediately sued in July 2008 and a protracted legal battle followed, ending in November 2009 with a summary judgement against Psystar. In May 2012, the U.S. Supreme Court denied Psystar's appeal, closing the case for good.

== Licensed clones ==
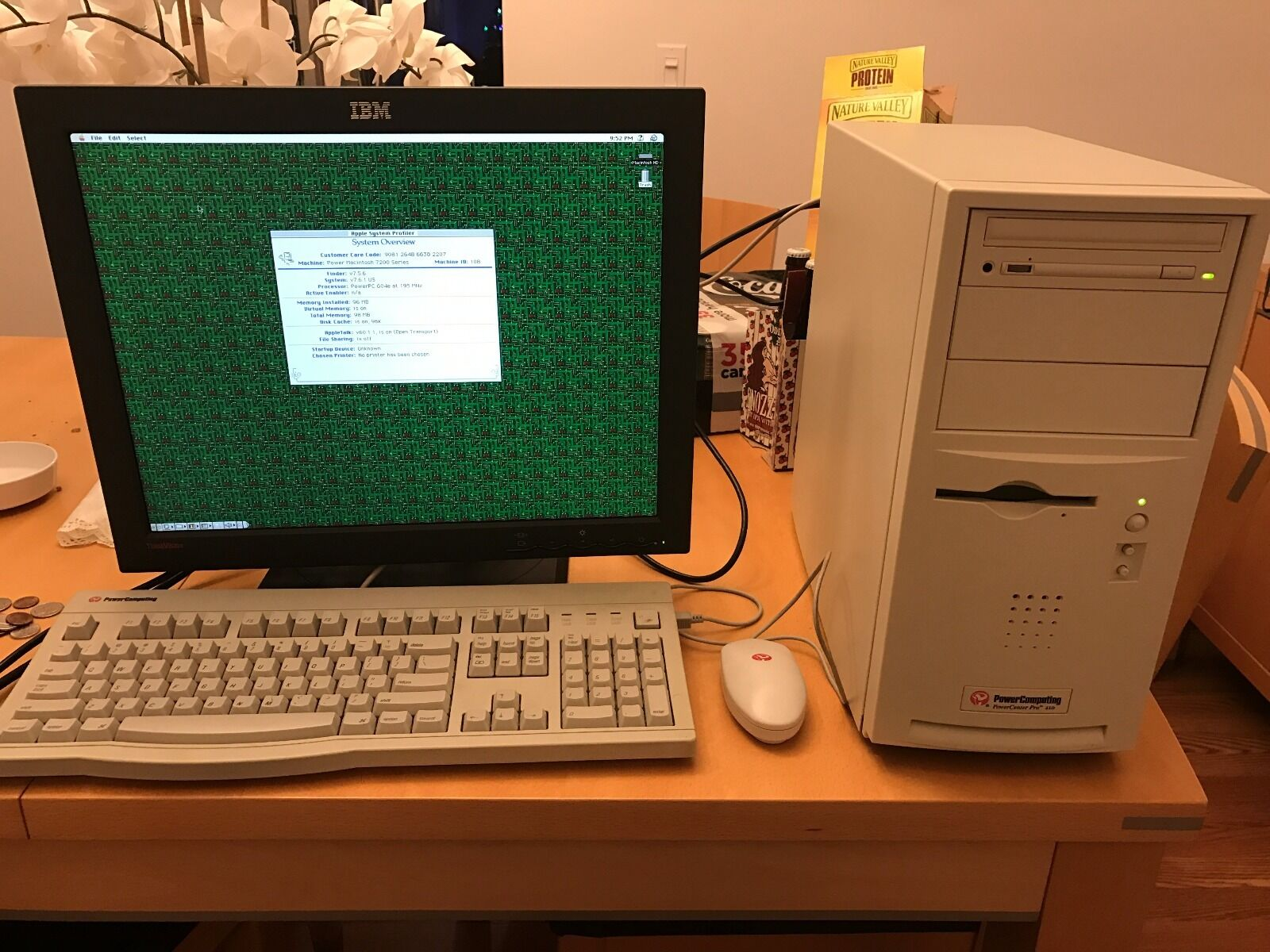
PowerCenter Pro 210, a Macintosh clone by Power Computing

In 1992, Macworld published an editorial stating that Apple clones were coming, and that the company should license its technology to others so it would benefit as the overall Macintosh market grew. By then Apple was already contemplating official clones of its computers. Expecting that the AIM alliance of 1991 with IBM would result in the latter becoming an important Macintosh cloner, Apple did not allow other companies to do so.

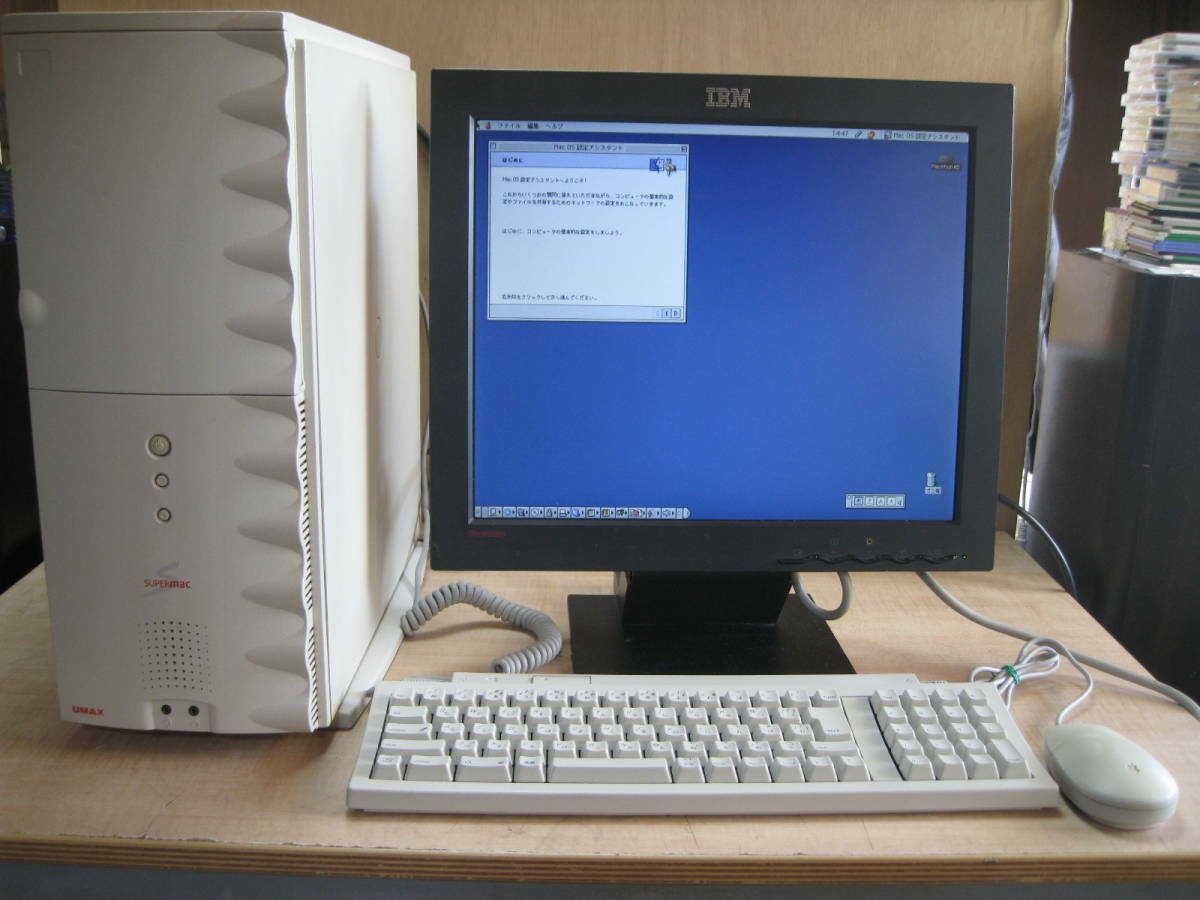
UMAX SuperMac S900, a Macintosh clone by UMAX

By 1995, increasing demand for IBM mainframes decreased that company's interest in personal computers. Macintoshes accounted for around 7% of the worldwide desktop computer market. Apple executives decided to launch an official clone program in order to expand Macintosh market penetration. Apple's Mac OS 7 licensing program entailed the licensing of the Macintosh ROMs and system software to other manufacturers, each of which agreed to pay a flat fee for a license, and a royalty (initially US$50 (equivalent to $106 in 2025)) for each clone computer they sold. This generated quick revenues for Apple during a time of financial crisis.

From early 1995 through mid-1997, it was possible to buy PowerPC-based clone computers running Mac OS, most notably from Power Computing, UMAX and Motorola. However, by 1996 Apple executives were worried that high-end clones were cannibalizing sales of their own high-end computers, where profit margins were highest.

A total of 75 distinct Macintosh clone models are known to have been introduced during the licensee era.

The following companies produced licensed Mac clones:

Company	Products
Akia	MicroBook Power
APS Technology	M*Power
Bandai	Atmark, @World (Apple Pippin)
Centralen Norrland	Reid
Centro HL	MacOS Clones
ComJet	PowerCity
Computer Warehouse	B-Machine, Boston, Cannes, Harvard, Hollywood, Manhattan, Nashville, New York, Paris, Rome, Stanford
DayStar Digital	Genesis, MP-Card "nPower", Millenium
DynaTec	Junior, 5/300, 10/300
Gravis	MT, TT, TT Pro, Gravision Four
International Computer	IC 3, IC 4
Katz Media	KMP 2000 (Apple Pippin)
Mactell	Twister, Typhoon, XB, XB-Pro, PowerJolt Upgrade, PowerJolt OverDrive Upgrade
MacWay	Starway
MacWorks	Millenium, Millenium G3
Marathon Computer	Rack Mac
Maxxboxx Datasystems	MaxxBoxx 730/200, 790/Tanzania, 860/nitro, 930/mocca, 960/tsunami
Motorola	StarMax 3000, 4000, 5000
Pioneer	MPC-LX100, MPC-GX1, MPC-LX200
PIOS Computer	Keenya, Magna, Maxxtrem, Magna Card Upgrade, Joecard Upgrade
PotzBits	PotzBits 975, 985
Power Dome	Alternate 4200, 4233, 4250
Power Computing	Power, PowerBase, PowerCenter/Pro, PowerCurve, PowerTower/Pro, PowerWave
PowerEx	StepMAC
PowerTools	Infinity, X-Factor, X-Force
Radius	System 100, System 81/110
RedBox	Expression 604e
Shaye	Shaye 200, Shaye 200/II
Storm	Challenger, Mercury, Surge, G3 Upgrade-Cards
Tatung	TPC
UMAX	SuperMac series: C500, C600, J700, J710, S900, S910, Aegis, Apus, Centauri, Pulsar
Vertegri	QuickTower, ImediaEngine
VisionPower	PowerExpress, PowerExtreme, PowerMax Pro

A number of major PC clone manufacturers, including Gateway 2000 and Acer, along with a number of Taiwanese clone vendors, had sought to license Mac OS and produce Mac clones but had been rebuffed by Apple. Such decisions were interpreted as Apple not wishing to relinquish its position of control over the Macintosh market and being unable to support existing licensees. Licensing agreements with other companies remained unannounced during September 1995, these involving Acorn Computers, Olivetti and GoldStar, ostensibly due to supply issues around certain components used in Mac systems. Reports in MacWeek had also suggested that Dell and Compaq had been "seriously considering" the production of Common Hardware Reference Platform (CHRP) systems. Systems conforming to the CHRP standard were anticipated to reduce the support burden on Apple, allowing clone manufacturers to more readily deviate from Apple's own designs.

=== Jobs ends the official program ===
In early 1997 Apple indicated that it wanted much higher license revenue from clonemakers, and other conditions. In June it and Power Computing tentatively agreed to new terms. The deal was not finalized before the July 9 departure of Apple CEO Gil Amelio. After Steve Jobs became de facto CEO, he personally tried to renegotiate licensing deals more favorable to Apple five times over the course of three weeks; each time, in his own words, Jobs was "basically told to pound sand". This response caused him to halt negotiations of upcoming licensing deals with OS licensees that Apple executives complained were still financially unfavorable.

Because clone manufacturers were licensed only to ship the System 7 operating system, Apple renamed its planned Mac OS 7.7 release as Mac OS 8, which was released in July 1997. The name change prevented most clone manufacturers from shipping the current version of the operating system and effectively ended the Mac cloning program. At the same time, Apple began to move away from the CHRP, eventually declining to license CHRP-based clone hardware.

Power Computing, the largest clone manufacturer, had signed its licensing agreement before Apple limited clone licenses to System 7, which would have allowed it to continue shipping Macintosh clones. Instead, Apple purchased Power Computing's Mac clone business for US$100 million. UMAX was the only clone manufacturer to receive a license to ship Mac OS 8, although that license expired in July 1998.

By late 1997, Apple had terminated the licensing agreements of all remaining Macintosh clone manufacturers. Most either shifted their focus to Windows-based personal computers or exited the market. Motorola's clone license was terminated following a contentious telephone conversation between Jobs and Motorola CEO Christopher Galvin. At the time, Apple remained dependent on Motorola for PowerPC processors. According to reports, Galvin subsequently instructed employees to end Apple's most favored customer status and treat it as "just another customer" for PowerPC processors.

In 1999, Jobs had discussions with Ben Rosen, chairman and interim CEO of Compaq at the time, for the world's then-largest Wintel PC manufacturer to license Mac OS, which would have been a coup for Apple. However no agreement was reached, as Apple had second thoughts about licensing its "crown jewel", while Compaq did not want to offend Microsoft, which it had partnered with since its founding in 1982. By 2007, five years after Compaq merged with HP, Rosen told Jobs he had switched to being a Mac user.

In 2001, Jobs reportedly had a meeting with Sony executives, saying he was "willing to make an exception" for Sony VAIO to run Mac OS X, although the negotiations later fell through.

After Apple transitioned the Macintosh to an Intel platform in 2006, and subsequent to a major increase in visibility and a gain in computer market share for Apple with the success of the iPod, large computer system manufacturers such as Dell expressed renewed interest in creating Macintosh clones. While various industry executives, notably Michael Dell, stated publicly that they wanted to sell Macintosh-compatible computers, Apple VP Phil Schiller said the company did not plan to let people run Mac OS X (macOS) on other computer makers' hardware. "We will not allow running Mac OS X on anything other than an Apple Mac," he said. This desire became moot once Apple transitioned from Intel's platform to its own custom chips.

== Macintosh conversion ==
Unlike Mac clones that contain little or no original Apple hardware, a Mac conversion is an aftermarket enclosure kit that requires the core components of a previously purchased, genuine Apple Mac computer, such as the Macintosh ROM or the motherboard, in order to become a functional computer system. This business model is most commonly used in the car industry, with one of the most famous examples being the Shelby Mustang, a high performance variant of the Ford Mustang, and is protected in the U.S. by the First-sale doctrine and similar legal concepts in most other countries.

While Mac clones traditionally aim to compete directly with Apple's solutions through lower prices, Mac conversions target market segments that lack dedicated solutions from Apple, and where the need for a Mac solution is high enough to justify the combined cost of the full price of the Mac donor computer plus the price of the conversion kit and labor.

The following companies produced Mac conversions:

Company	Products
Assistive Technology, Inc.	Freestyle
Axiotron, Inc.	Modbook 100, Modbook 150
Colby Systems	Classmate, WalkMac SE, WalkMac SE-30
Cutting Edge	Quatro 850
Dynamac	Dynamac, Dynamac EL, Dynamac SE, Dynamac IIsf
Hardware Research, Inc.	Rack Mounted Mac
Intelitec Systems Corp.	MX Plus
Marathon Computer, Inc.	iRack, PowerRack
McMobile	McMobile
Modbook Inc.	Modbook Pro, Modbook Pro X
Outbound	Laptop, Notebook
Sixty-Eight Thousand, Inc.	Dash 30fx, Dash 40Q
Uchishiba Seisakusho, Inc.	BookcaSE

== See also ==
- IBM PC compatible
- Darwin (operating system)
