= UMAX Technologies =

Taiwanese computer peripherals company

- Type: Private
- Founded: 1987; 39 years ago
- Headquarters: Taiwan
- Products: laptops, scanners, printers, software, peripherals
- Website: www.umax.com

UMAX Technologies (Chinese: 世成科技; pinyin: Shìchéng Kējì), originally known as UMAX Computer Corporation, is a manufacturer of computer products, including scanners, mice, and flash drives, based in Taiwan. The company also uses the Yamada and Vaova brand names.

== History ==
UMAX logo from 1987 to the mid-1990s

UMAX was formerly a maker of Apple Macintosh clones, using the SuperMac brand name outside of Europe. Their models included the SuperMac S900/S910, J700, C500 and C500e/i/LT, C600e/v/LT/x and Aegis 200. The C500 was marketed as the Apus 2000 in Europe. After Steve Jobs returned to Apple as the new CEO, he revoked all of the clone producers' licenses to produce Mac clones except for UMAX, due to their sub-US$1,000 low-end offerings, a market in which Apple was not strong, and UMAX's stated desire to expand the Macintosh platform's presence in East Asian markets. UMAX's license for Mac OS 8 expired in July 1998. UMAX could not remain profitable selling only these systems, however; it briefly made IBM PC compatible computers in the mid-1990s, but since then UMAX has mainly concentrated on manufacturing scanners.

In 1995, UMAX was the leading Taiwanese scanner maker, with a market share of 13% second worldwide behind Hewlett-Packard (HP). This continued to be the case throughout 1996. According to PC Data figures, in 1997 UMAX briefly overtook HP in some monthly sales. According to the same source however, by 1999 UMAX was being "eclipsed" by HP whose scanner market share doubled that year from 13% to 26%. In some markets with high price-sensitivity like India for example, UMAX continued to have a slight lead on HP throughout 1999–2000 with the two companies claiming 44% and 40%, respectively, of the scanner sales in this country; 85% of which were for products costing less than 10,000 Rs.) By 2003, HP and Canon were dominating the world's flatbed scanner market, "accounting for a combined unit market share of 81 per cent."

In 2002, UMAX started to charge its US customers for driver upgrades for its scanners—a practice that soon proved controversial.

Until their exit from the desktop scanner market in 2002, Heidelberger Druckmaschinen used UMAX as its OEM for these products.

UMAX also made a 1.3 megapixel digital camera called the AstraPix 490. It is capable of recording video clips, functioning as a webcam and can even be used to listen to music encoded in MP3 format.

== Scanners ==
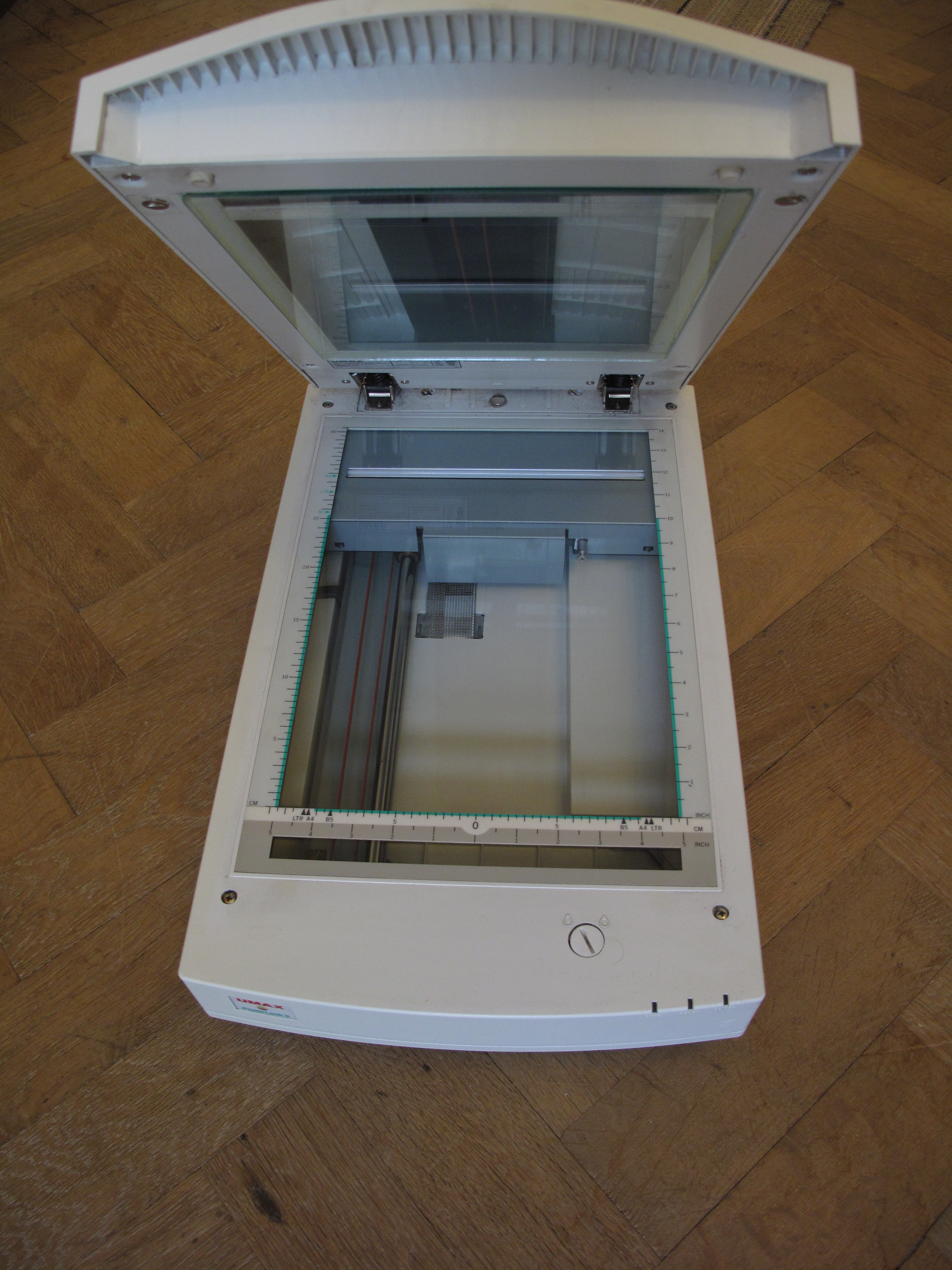
UMAX PowerLook II

- Astra 610S and 1200S; these were cloned and/or repackaged (OEM'd) for many other manufacturers
- Astra 1220P
- Astra 2000U
- Astra 2100U
- Astra 2400S, NCR 53C80 SCSI/Intel 8031 based 600x1200dpi
- Astra 3450
- Astra 4900
- Astra 4950
- Astra 5600
- Astra 6700
- AstraSlim
- AstraSlim SE
- PowerLook 1000
- PowerLook 1120
- PowerLook 2100XL
- PowerLook 180
- PowerLook 270

== Scanner software ==
UMAX offers some semi-free (in the sense that some versions/updates cost money and some do not) basic scanner software for Microsoft Windows (up to Windows XP) and Mac OS:

- VistaScan is their basic TWAIN scanner module, which also contains Windows Image Acquisition (WIA) drivers in its newer versions. It features a simpler interface compared to MagicScan. However, not all versions work with all products. In general, VistaScan versions after 3.55 no longer support SCSI scanners. The German site of UMAX has a (bilingual) webpage/wizard that helps the user select the proper version for their scanner.
- MagicScan is the higher-end version of VistaScan, with a user interface aimed at more experienced users; it did not ship with the cheaper scanners (Astra, etc.) but only with the higher-end (PowerLook) scanners. It does however work with many of the cheaper UMAX scanners. Versions after 4.71 no longer ship with SCSI drivers.

Additionally, UMAX offers more sophisticated (typically non-free) third-party photo scanning/correction software:

- binuscan PhotoPerfect, which is a standalone application and has a plug-in for MagicScan; PhotoPerfect is also bundled with high-end scanners and sold separately for others
- SilverFast is compatible with many UMAX scanner, especially those with SCSI interface; its entry-level (SE) version is shipped with some newer UMAX scanners. and offered separately for others

For optical character recognition, some UMAX scanners came bundled with OmniPage and others with ABBYY FineReader.

The Unix SANE software generally supports the UMAX SCSI scanners well, with varying degrees of support for the others (USB, FireWire, parallel).

== See also ==
- List of companies of Taiwan
