= UMAX SuperMac =

Taiwanese Macintosh clone

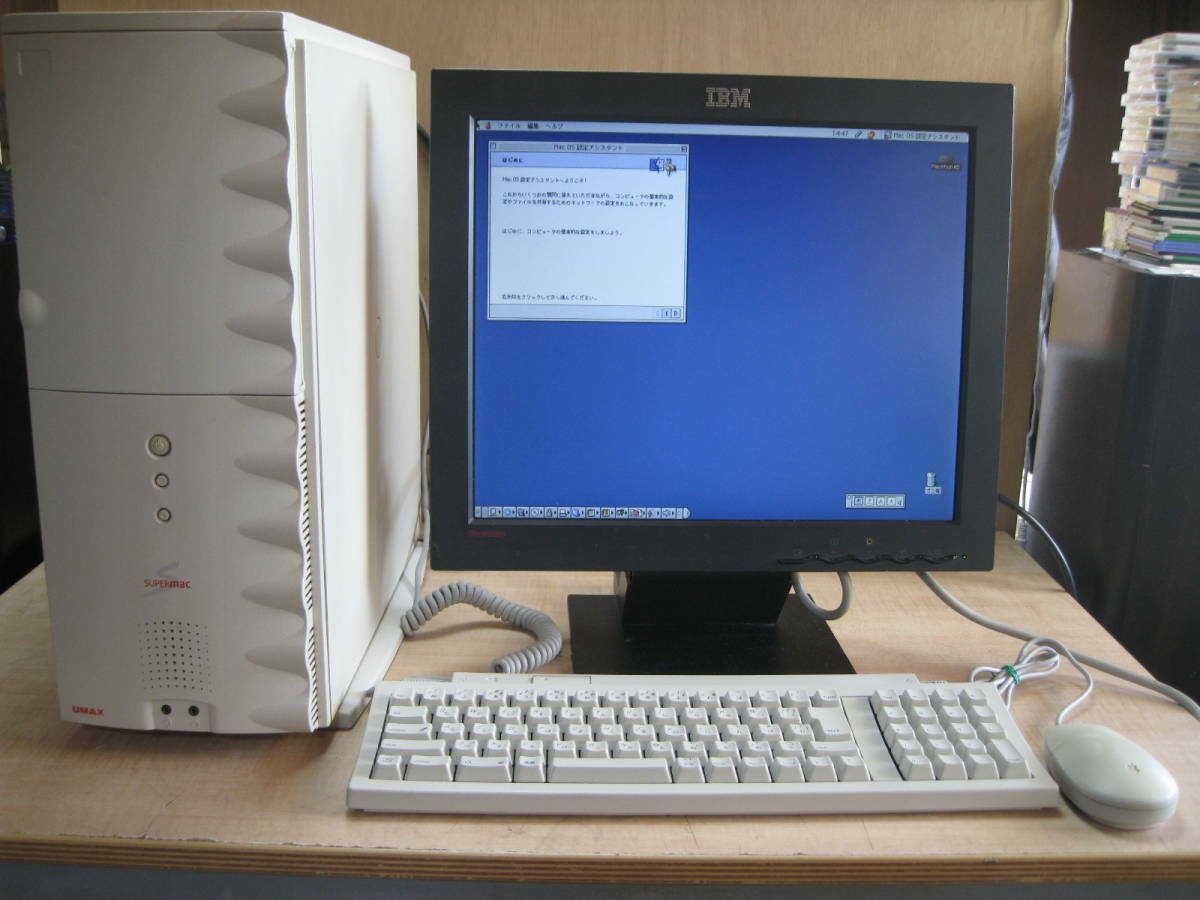
A UMAX SuperMac S900 running Mac OS 9.1.

The SuperMac was a line of Macintosh clones produced by UMAX Technologies from 1996 to 1998. Their models included the SuperMac S900/S910, J700, C500 and C500e/i/LT, C600e/v/LT/x and Aegis 200. The C500 was marketed as the Apus 2000 in Europe. They used versions of Apple's motherboard like Tsunami, Alchemy, and Tanzania, which were designed to use standard IBM PC compatible components in addition to Apple-proprietary components then in common use in the Power Macintosh family. The machines were popular in places like Asia, Europe, and North America due to their low price and their reliability.

After Steve Jobs returned to Apple as the new CEO, he revoked all of the clone producers' licenses to produce Mac clones except for UMAX, due to their sub-US$1,000 low-end offerings, a market in which Apple was not strong, and UMAX's stated desire to expand the Macintosh platform's presence in East Asian markets. UMAX was the only Macintosh clone manufacturer to get a license for Mac OS 8, which expired in July 1998. UMAX knew that they couldn't continue producing the SuperMac without the Mac OS 8 license and sought to get the license extended or renewed, but conflict between Apple and UMAX over the latter's proposed J710 and Apple's own upcoming iMac G3 resulted in Apple not renewing their license. UMAX also considered continuing the brand as a PC manufacturer, but instead decided to shut down the brand.

On May 27, 1998, UMAX ceased production of MacOS-based computers, and sold all remaining inventory by August 31, 1998. UMAX's license for Mac OS 8 had expired by July 31, and all remaining SuperMac operations (including technical support) were either terminated or absorbed into UMAX's regular operations by 31 December 1998. UMAX continued to provide technical support for SuperMac machines until July 31, 2002.

== Product line ==
The SuperMac was sold in three different product lines: Pulsar (S900), Centauri (J700), and Apus (C500/C600). There was the European-exclusive SuperMac Aegis 200, which was a specialized SuperMac J700 motherboard inside a SuperMac C600 case. There was also the SuperMac S900Base (w/ G3), which was a S900 with a PowerPC G3 processor. It was the last SuperMac to be sold by UMAX before its discontinuation. In addition, UMAX was developing the J710, a planned successor to the J700 but more powerful and with a G3 processor when UMAX discontinued the SuperMac brand. Only a handful of prototypes survive.

SuperMac models numbers were derived using a standard system: (product line)/(CPU speed)

- product line was C500, C600, J700, or S900 and designated the CPU used in the machine
  - C500 and C600 used PowerPC 603e processors
  - J700 and S900 used PowerPC 604e processors.
- cpu speed was the processor's clock speed, in megahertz

== Upgrades ==
The S900 was one of the most popular Macintosh clone to ever be made. The S900 and other UMAX SuperMacs can officially go up to Mac OS 8.1 due to the Mac OS 8 license UMAX made with Apple (all other Macintosh clones can only officially go up to Mac OS 7.6). While most SuperMacs came with Mac OS 7, a UMAX Update Disk for the SuperMac S900 & J700 series allows them to update to Mac OS 8.0 and 8.1, although the FWB Hard Disk Toolkit driver must be updated to version 2.0.6 or newer before the system can be updated to Mac OS 8 and newer. However, despite officially only going up to Mac OS 8.1, the SuperMac is capable of being upgraded to Mac OS 8.5 (8.5 came out after UMAX's license expired) and up to Mac OS 9.1, although this is not officially supported by Apple.

Powered by a PowerPC 604e processor, the S900 cannot run Mac OS X natively, but with the addition of a G3 processor upgrade and the use of XPostFacto 4.0, the S900 could run several versions of Mac OS X up to 10.4 Tiger, with some limitations.

A number of SuperMac community websites have appeared over the years.
